= Nowy Dwór =

Nowy Dwór (Polish for "new manor") may refer to:

- Nowy Dwór, Chodzież County in Greater Poland Voivodeship (west-central Poland)
- Nowy Dwór, Kościan County in Greater Poland Voivodeship (west-central Poland)
- Nowy Dwór, Nowy Tomyśl County in Greater Poland Voivodeship (west-central Poland)
- Nowy Dwór, Piła County in Greater Poland Voivodeship (west-central Poland)
- Nowy Dwór, Złotów County in Greater Poland Voivodeship (west-central Poland)
- Nowy Dwór, Brodnica County in Kuyavian-Pomeranian Voivodeship (north-central Poland)
- Nowy Dwór, Gmina Dąbrowa Chełmińska in Kuyavian-Pomeranian Voivodeship (north-central Poland)
- Nowy Dwór, Gmina Koronowo in Kuyavian-Pomeranian Voivodeship (north-central Poland)
- Nowy Dwór, Golub-Dobrzyń County in Kuyavian-Pomeranian Voivodeship (north-central Poland)
- Nowy Dwór, Grudziądz County in Kuyavian-Pomeranian Voivodeship (north-central Poland)
- Nowy Dwór, Inowrocław County in Kuyavian-Pomeranian Voivodeship (north-central Poland)
- Nowy Dwór, Radziejów County in Kuyavian-Pomeranian Voivodeship (north-central Poland)
- Nowy Dwór, Sępólno County in Kuyavian-Pomeranian Voivodeship (north-central Poland)
- Nowy Dwór, Łódź Voivodeship (central Poland)
- Nowy Dwór, Oleśnica County in Lower Silesian Voivodeship (south-west Poland)
- Nowy Dwór, Oława County in Lower Silesian Voivodeship (south-west Poland)
- Nowy Dwór, Polkowice County in Lower Silesian Voivodeship (south-west Poland)
- Nowy Dwór, Trzebnica County in Lower Silesian Voivodeship (south-west Poland)
- Nowy Dwór, Ząbkowice County in Lower Silesian Voivodeship (south-west Poland)
- Nowy Dwór, Gmina Piszczac, Biała County in Lublin Voivodeship (east Poland)
- Nowy Dwór, Lublin County in Lublin Voivodeship (east Poland)
- Nowy Dwór, Międzyrzecz County in Lubusz Voivodeship (west Poland)
- Nowy Dwór, Żagań County in Lubusz Voivodeship (west Poland)
- Nowy Dwór, Masovian Voivodeship (east-central Poland)
- Nowy Dwór Mazowiecki, in Masovian Voivodeship (east-central Poland)
- Nowy Dwór, Głubczyce County in Opole Voivodeship (south-west Poland)
- Nowy Dwór, Namysłów County in Opole Voivodeship (south-west Poland)
- Nowy Dwór, Sokółka County in Podlaskie Voivodeship (north-east Poland)
- Nowy Dwór, Suwałki County in Podlaskie Voivodeship (north-east Poland)
- Nowy Dwór Gdański, in Pomeranian Voivodeship (north Poland)
- Nowy Dwór, Chojnice County in Pomeranian Voivodeship (north Poland)
- Nowy Dwór, Gmina Somonino in Pomeranian Voivodeship (north Poland)
- Nowy Dwór, Gmina Sulęczyno in Pomeranian Voivodeship (north Poland)
- Nowy Dwór, Kwidzyn County in Pomeranian Voivodeship (north Poland)
- Nowy Dwór, Starogard County in Pomeranian Voivodeship (north Poland)
- Nowy Dwór, Gmina Łęczyce in Pomeranian Voivodeship (north Poland)
- Nowy Dwór, Lubliniec County in Silesian Voivodeship (south Poland)
- Nowy Dwór, Wodzisław County in Silesian Voivodeship (south Poland)
- Nowy Dwór, Świętokrzyskie Voivodeship (south-central Poland)
- Nowy Dwór, Działdowo County in Warmian-Masurian Voivodeship (north Poland)
- Nowy Dwór, Elbląg County in Warmian-Masurian Voivodeship (north Poland)
- Nowy Dwór, Lidzbark County in Warmian-Masurian Voivodeship (north Poland)
- Nowy Dwór, Ostróda County in Warmian-Masurian Voivodeship (north Poland)
- Nowy Dwór, Szczytno County in Warmian-Masurian Voivodeship (north Poland)
- Nowy Dwór, Wrocław in Wrocław (south-west Poland)
- Nowy Dwór mine, a former mine in Silesian Voivodeship

== See also ==
- Nowodwór (disambiguation)
- Novy Dvor, several localities in Belarus, Russia
- Nový Dvůr (disambiguation)
