= Berzdorfer See =

Berzdorfer See Lake Berzdorf
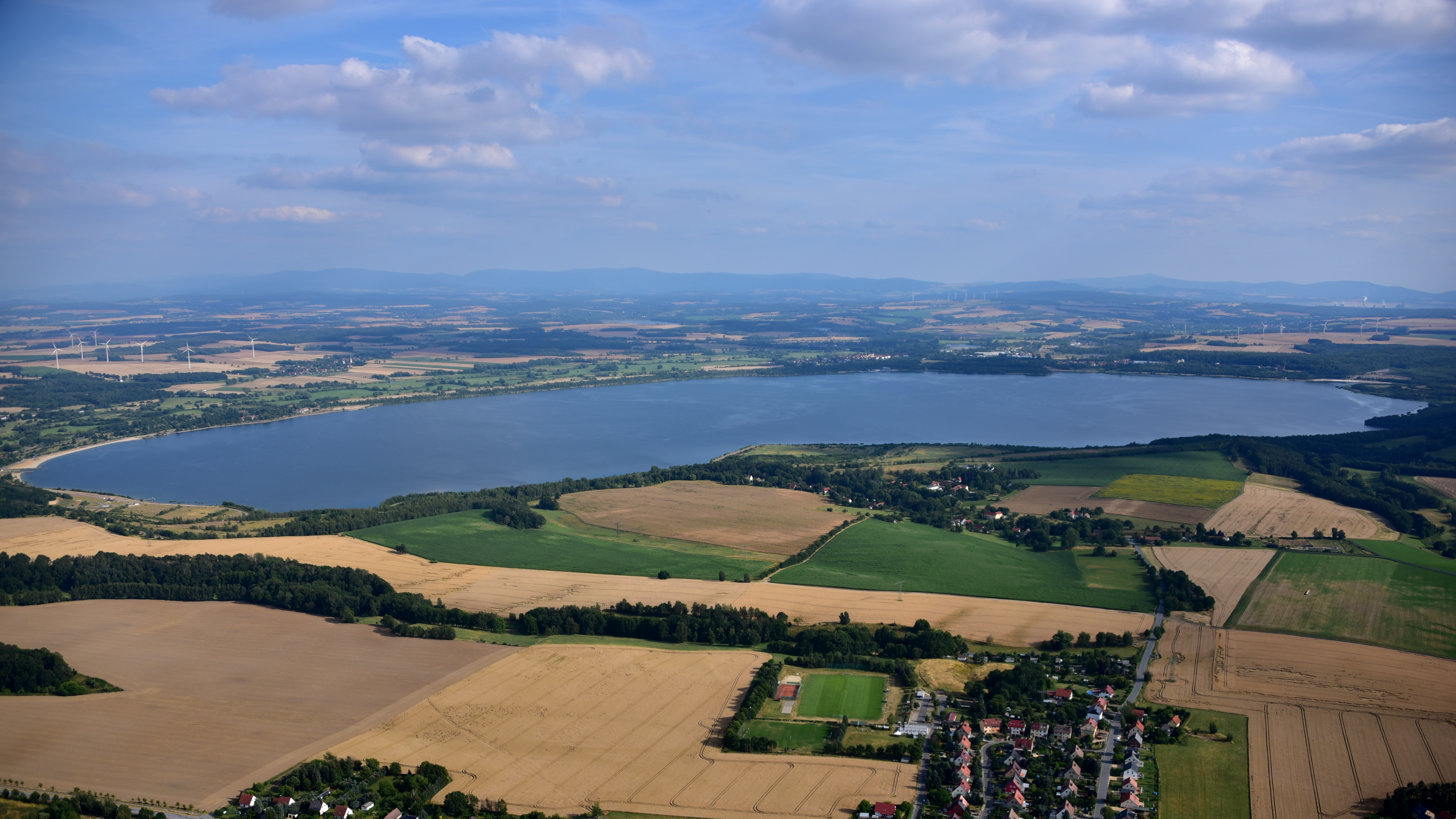
- Aerial image (2019)

- Location within Saxony
- Location: Saxony, Germany
- Coordinates: 51°05′N 14°57′E
- Type: artificial lake
- Primary inflows: artificially through transfers from the Lusatian Neisse, Pließnitz and other small inflows
- Primary outflows: artificially by transfer to the Lusatian Neisse
- Basin countries: Germany
- Max. length: 5 km (3.1 mi)
- Max. width: 3 km (1.9 mi)
- Surface area: 9.6 km^{2} (3.7 sq mi)
- Max. depth: 72 m (236 ft)
- Water volume: 330,000,000 m^{3} (1.2×10^{10} cu ft)
- Shore length^{1}: 18 km (11 mi)
- Surface elevation: 186 m (610 ft) MSL
- Settlements: Görlitz, Schönau-Berzdorf, Markersdorf
- ^{1} Shore length is not a well-defined measure.

The Berzdorfer See or Lake Berzdorf is located at the southern city limits of Görlitz in Upper Lusatia. It consists of the residual hole of the former Berzdorf open-cast lignite mine, which was flooded from 2002 to the beginning of 2013. The lake forms the southeastern corner of the Lusatian Lake District. With its volume of about 330 million cubic meters and a water depth of max. 72 meters on an area of 960 hectares, it is one of the largest lakes in Saxony. Its name derives from the small village Berzdorf, which was devastated in 1969/70.

== Geography ==
Lake Berzdorf is about five kilometers long and two kilometers wide and is located on the southern border of the city of Görlitz in Eastern Upper Lusatia. The Görlitz districts of Hagenwerder, Klein Neundorf and Tauchritz as well as the communities of Markersdorf and Schönau-Berzdorf border the former open pit mine. The lake water level is 186 m above sea level.

== Leisure ==
Since August 2007 it is possible to sail on Lake Berzdorf. The access for sailors is via the port Tauchritz and via the slipway at the sailing base Blaue Lagune.

An observation tower, pony farm, a themed miniature golf course and a climbing tower complete the offer.

== History ==
=== History of Mining ===
The Field is a tectonic deposit type. The basin is a tectonically northeast-southwest trending trench bounded at the margins by numerous faults with different strike directions. The deposit was heavily stressed by glacial ice during the Pleistocene, which had an impact on the geomorphological and geological characteristics of the basin.

On the German side, the Berzdorf coal seam has an average thickness of 80 meters and an extension of about three by eight kilometers. In comparison, the seams in Lower Lusatia have a thickness of ten meters over a length of about one hundred kilometers.

Around 1835, lignite mining began south of Görlitz at the site of the former village of Berzdorf, at that time in underground shafts. In 1919, mining was switched to open pit. In 1927, the open pit was flooded for reasons of profitability. After the end of World War II in 1946, the open pit mine underwent reactivation. The groundwater lake was drained and lignite mining was strongly promoted in a three-shift system.

In 1958, the Hagenwerder I power plant was put into operation to utilize the lignite on site. The area required for open pit mining was large: from 1962 to 1965, the village of Berzdorf was relocated to Schönau-Berzdorf. During these years, Plant II was already commissioned, followed by Plant III in 1970. Thus, the open pit mine developed into a large-scale open pit mine, with production rates of up to 7 million tons of lignite per year. Technologically, conveyor belt operation replaced the costly train operation, and modern bucket-wheel excavators produced up to 50,000 tons of coal per day. During the peak production period in the 1980s, the open pit mine was the workplace of around 7,000 people. In 1988, the village of Deutsch-Ossig also had to make way for coal mining.

After more than 150 years of lignite mining, coal production ceased in December 1997. A recoverable lignite volume of 60 million tons remained. This volume would have made it necessary to convert the power plant to desulfurization technology within the estimated 10 to 15 years. This would not have been economically viable.

As a technical monument of this time, the Excavator 1452 can be visited.

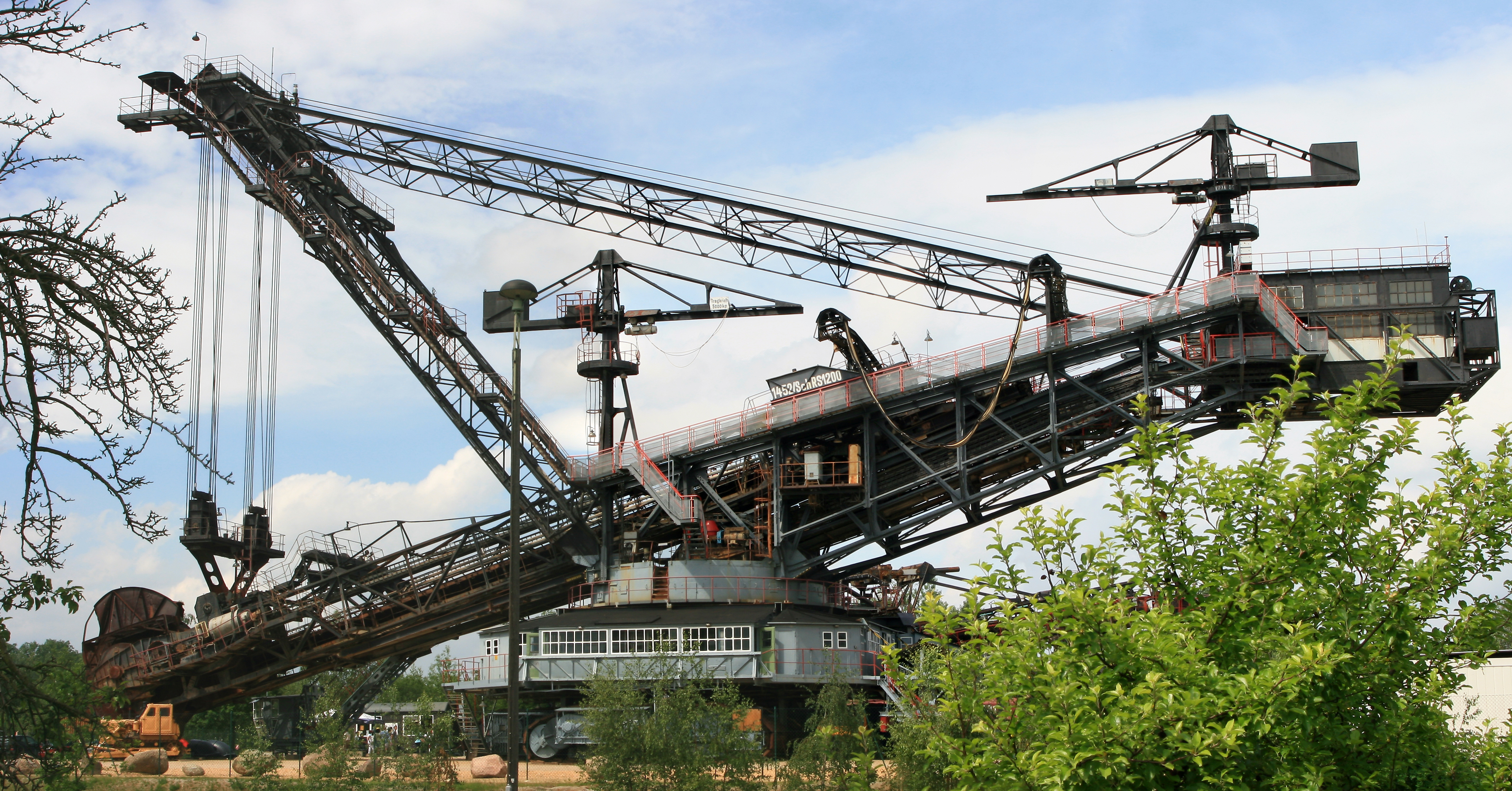
Excavator 1452

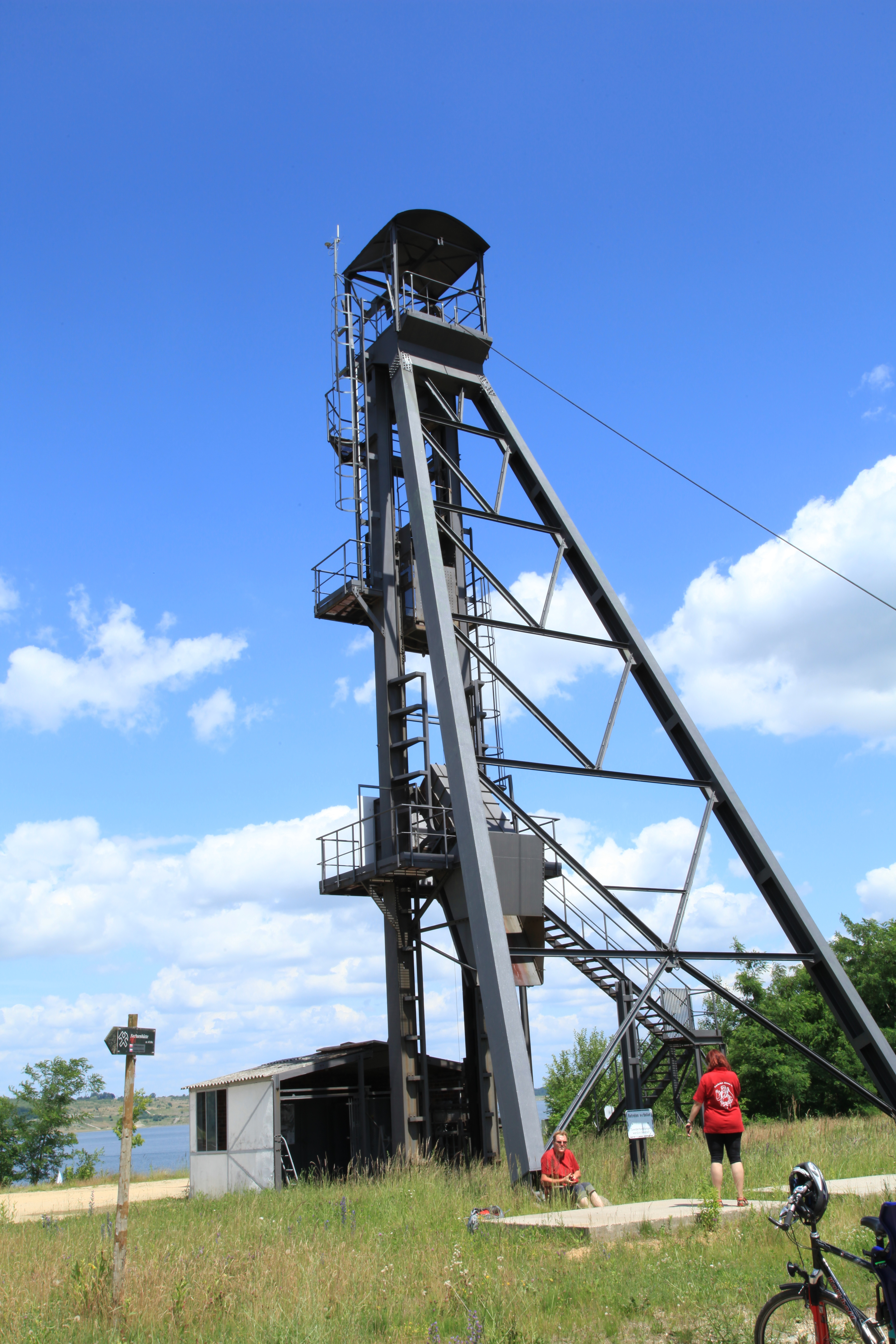
Skip shaft of the lignite mine, in Tauchritz

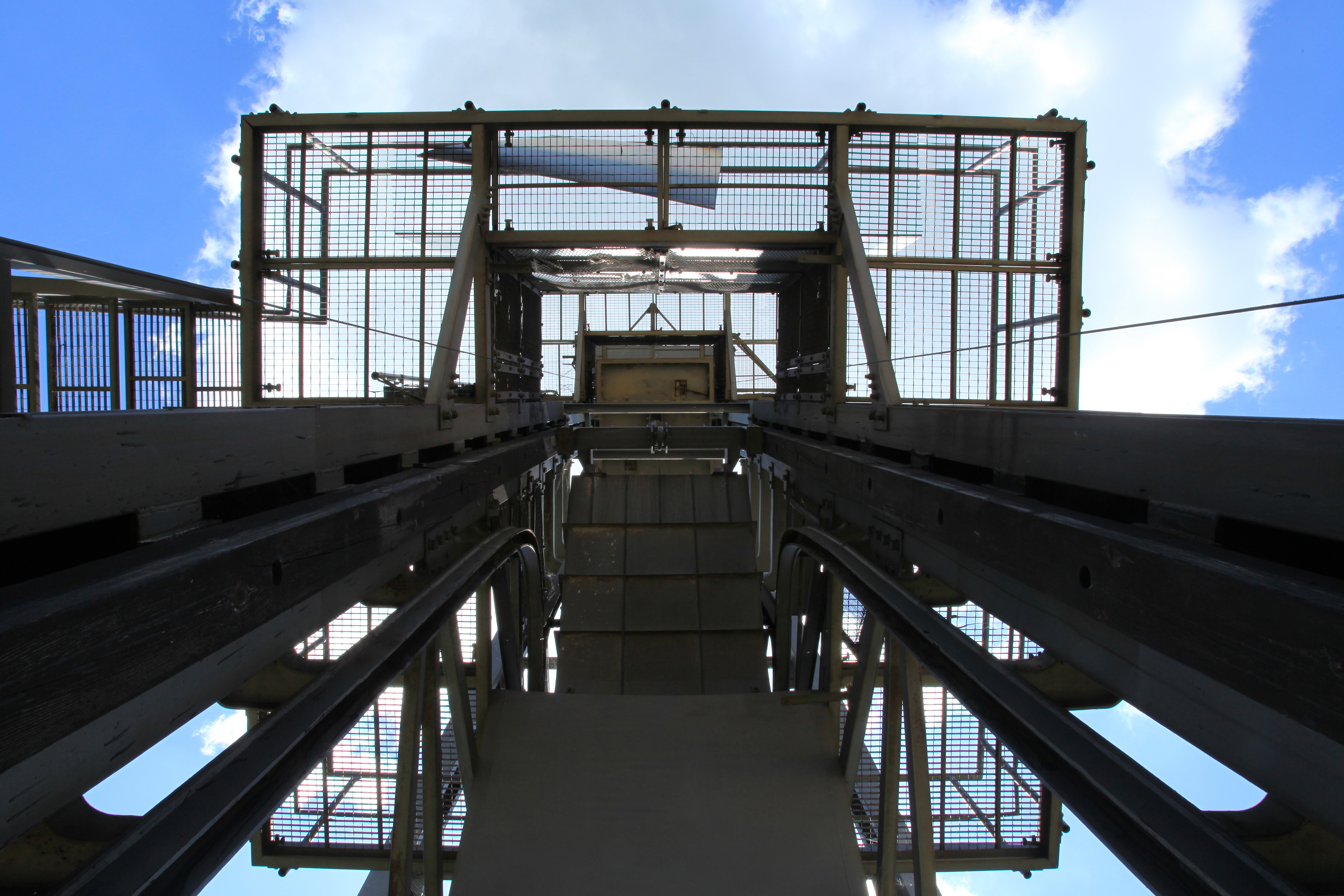
Skip shaft

=== Development as Recreational Area ===
The Lusatian and Central German Mining Management Company (de: LMBV) transformed the post-mining landscape into a recreational area. In 2002, flooding of the open pit with water from the Pließnitz River began. Flooding from the Neisse River with a one-kilometer-long transfer through two 1,6-meter-thick pipes began on February 18, 2004. The maximum flow was 10 cubic meters per second. Branch water from the Neisse River can be taken from a minimum flow of the Neisse of 13,3 cubic meters per second. In 2010, the lake was about half full when the nearby dam on the Smědá broke during heavy rains on August 7. Most of the flood water poured into the lake. "With one blow, the lake was full," as Görlitz-Mayor Siegfried Deinege looked back in August 2017. On February 6, 2013, the LMBV announced that the flooding target of Lake Berzdorf (186 m MSL) had been reached.

Like many other former open-cast mining pits, the lake is used for recreational purposes in addition to visual landscaping. A boat harbor with a 150-meter-long quay wall has been built in the south. There are several lookout points with information boards along the 18-kilometer-long lakeside path, including at Deutsch-Ossig and at Klein Neundorf.

In 2008, the more than twenty-meter-high Neuberzdorfer Höhe lookout tower was completed on the west bank on the Neuberzdorfer Höhe. The bathing areas at the so-called Blue Lagoon on the south side as well as on the east side in Hagenwerder were opened in 2010. The bathing beach on the northern shore has been accessible since the end of 2018.

With the declaration of navigability by the State of Saxony, the lake will be open to motorboats and passenger vessels during the day between April and October from September 12, 2022. Two restricted areas on the western shore may not be navigated at all. Kitesurfing, water skiing and amphibious vehicles remain generally prohibited.

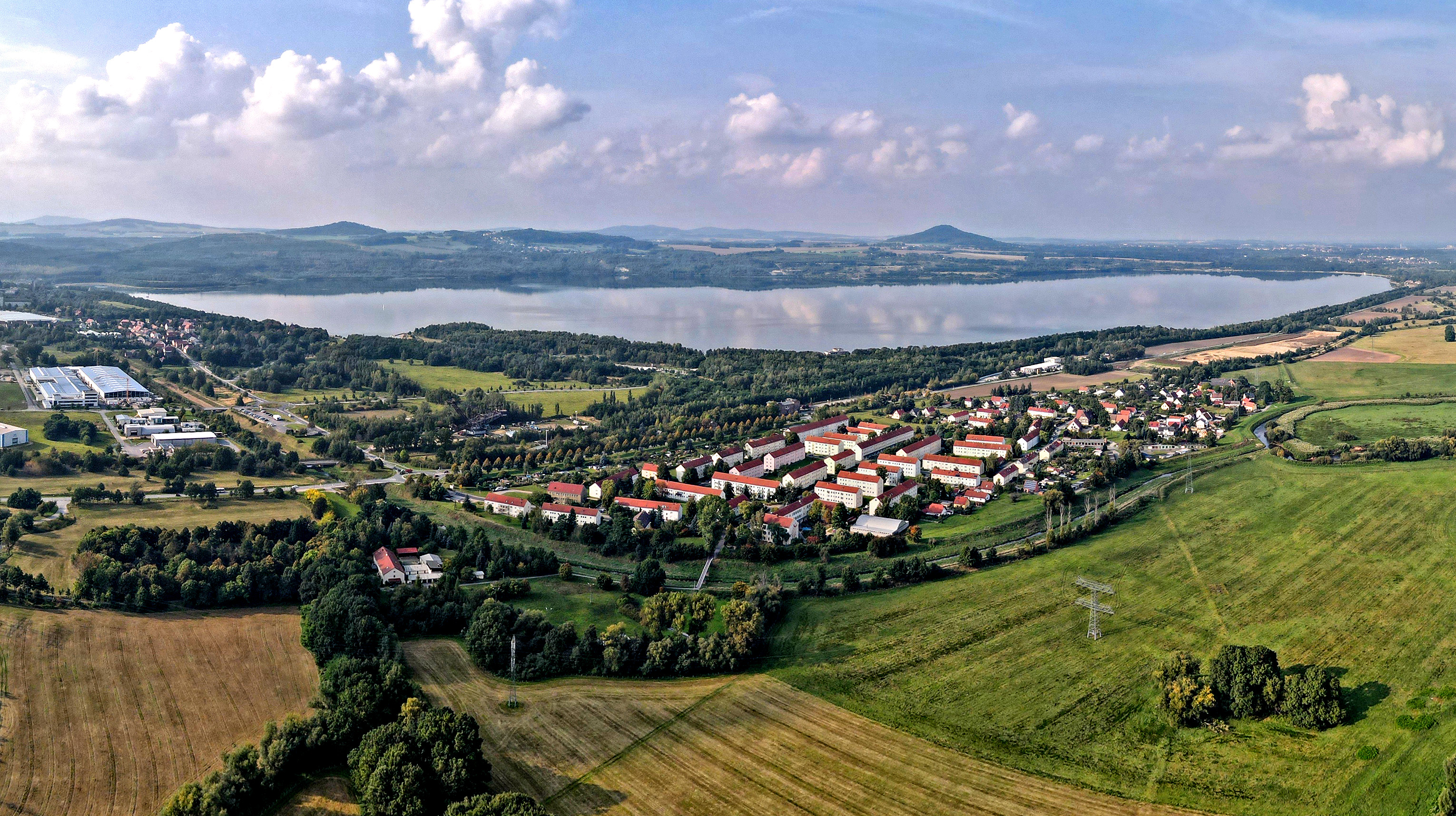
Lake and the village of Hagenwerder

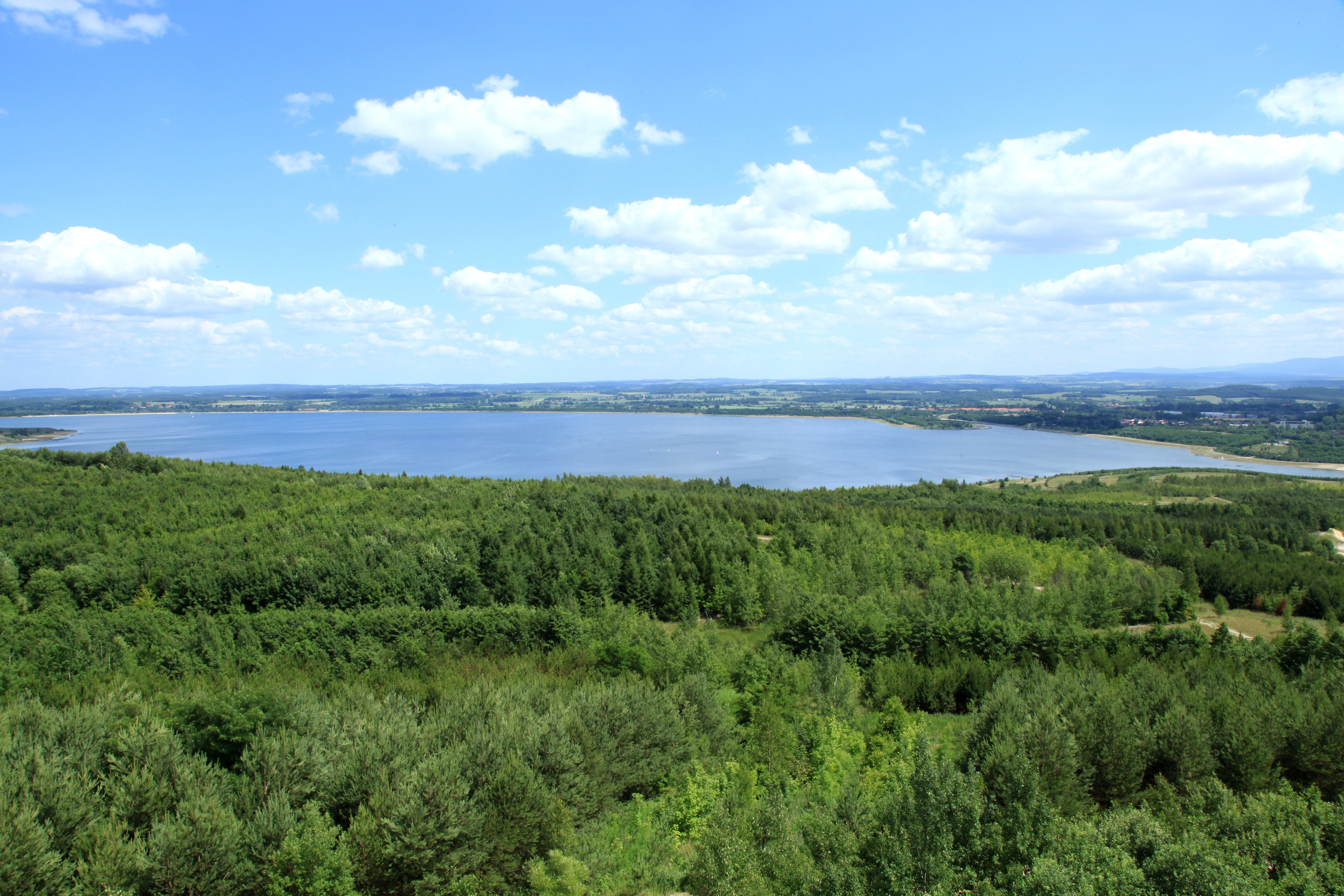
View from Neuberzdorfer Höhe lookout tower in Schönau-Berzdorf

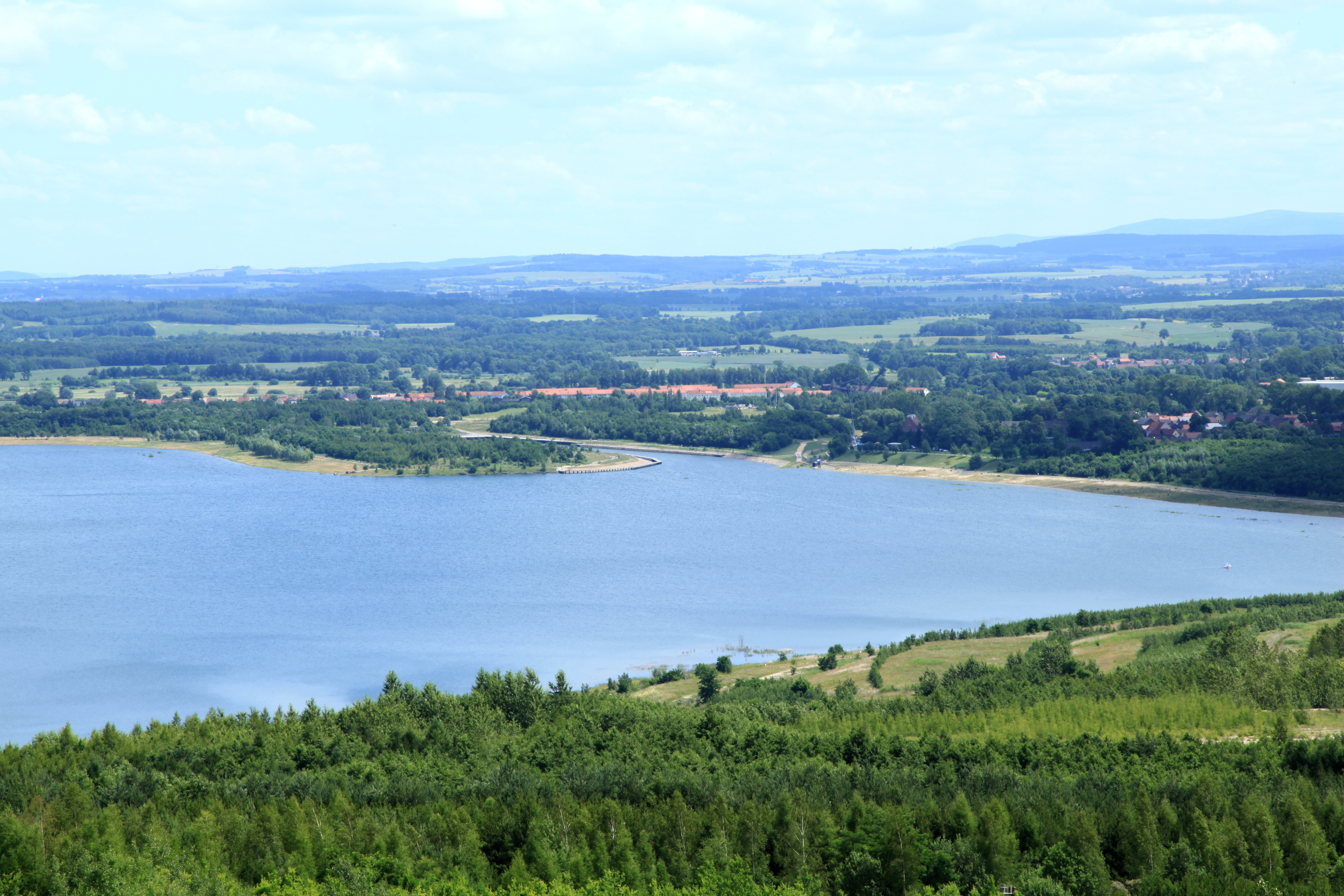
View from Neuberzdorfer Höhe lookout tower

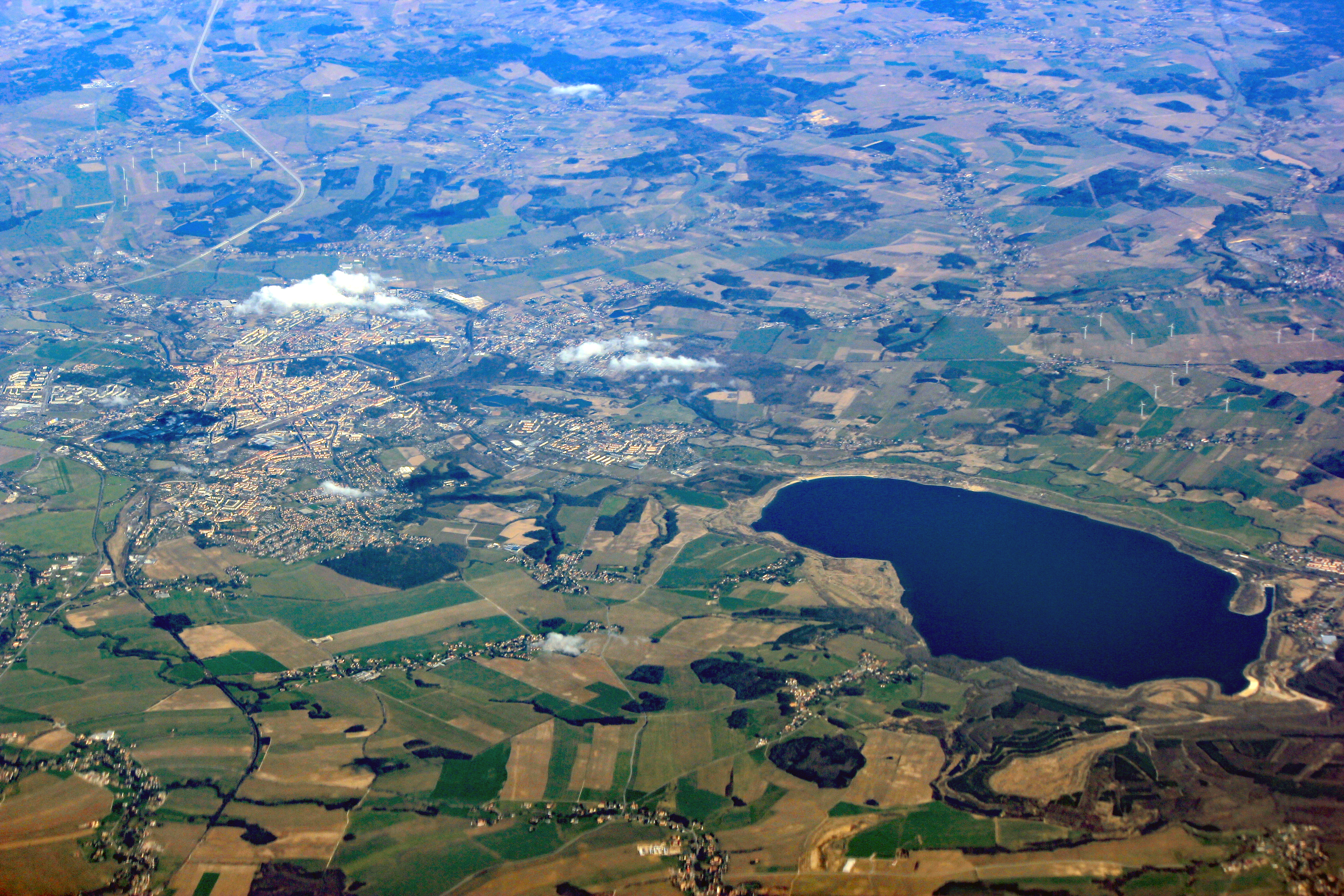
View from the air, with Görlitz (on left)

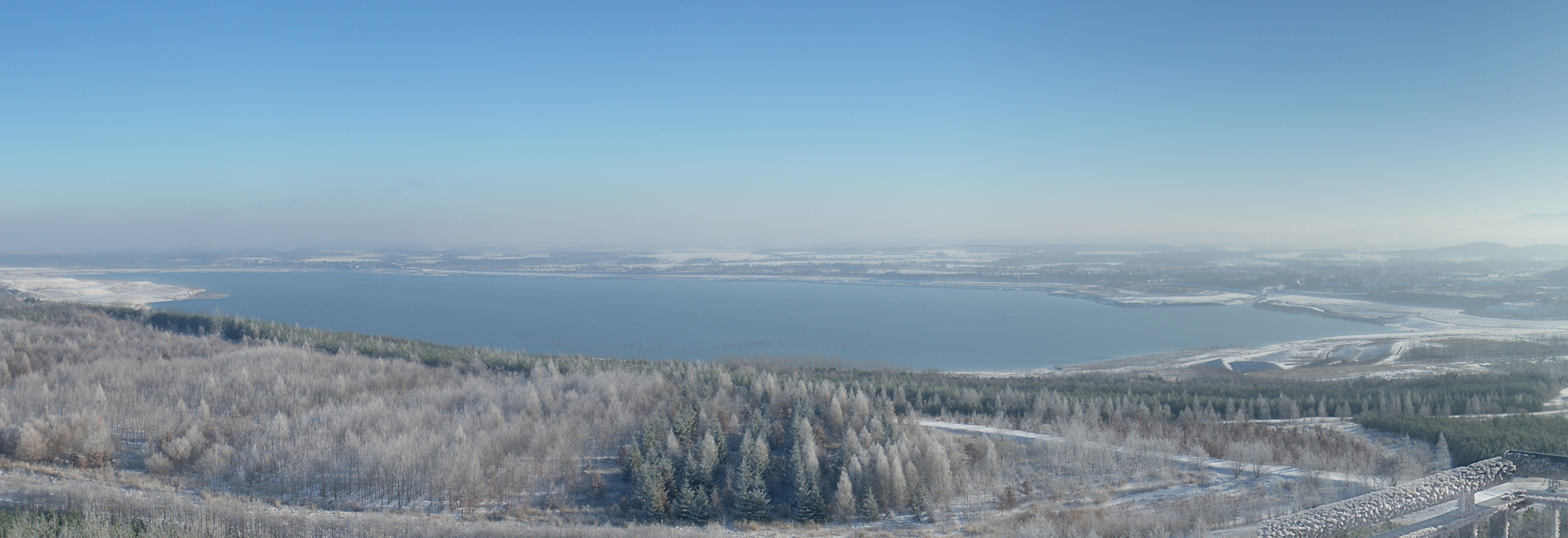
Panorama in snow, 2009

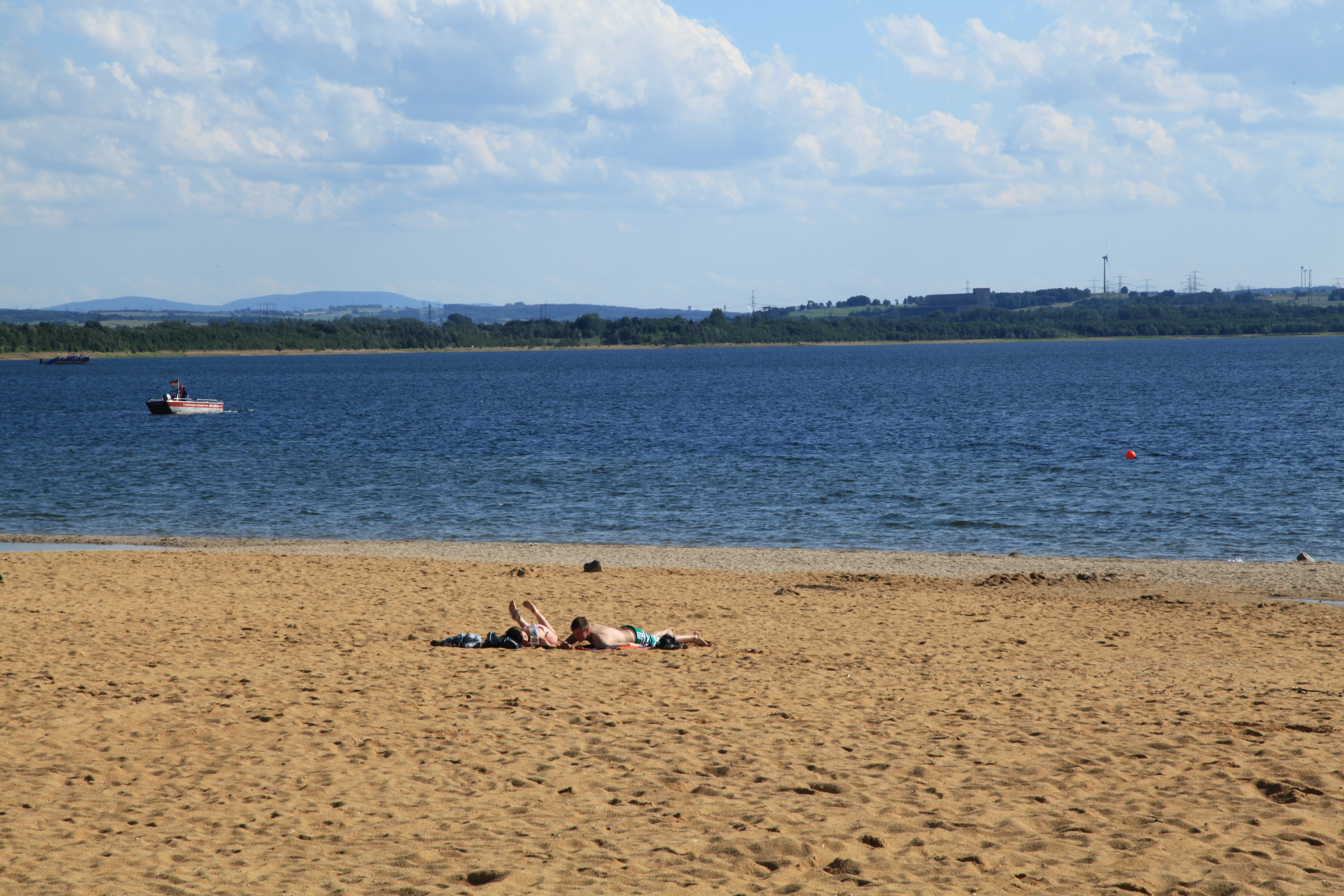
Lake Berzdorf and the beach Weinhübler Seeweg

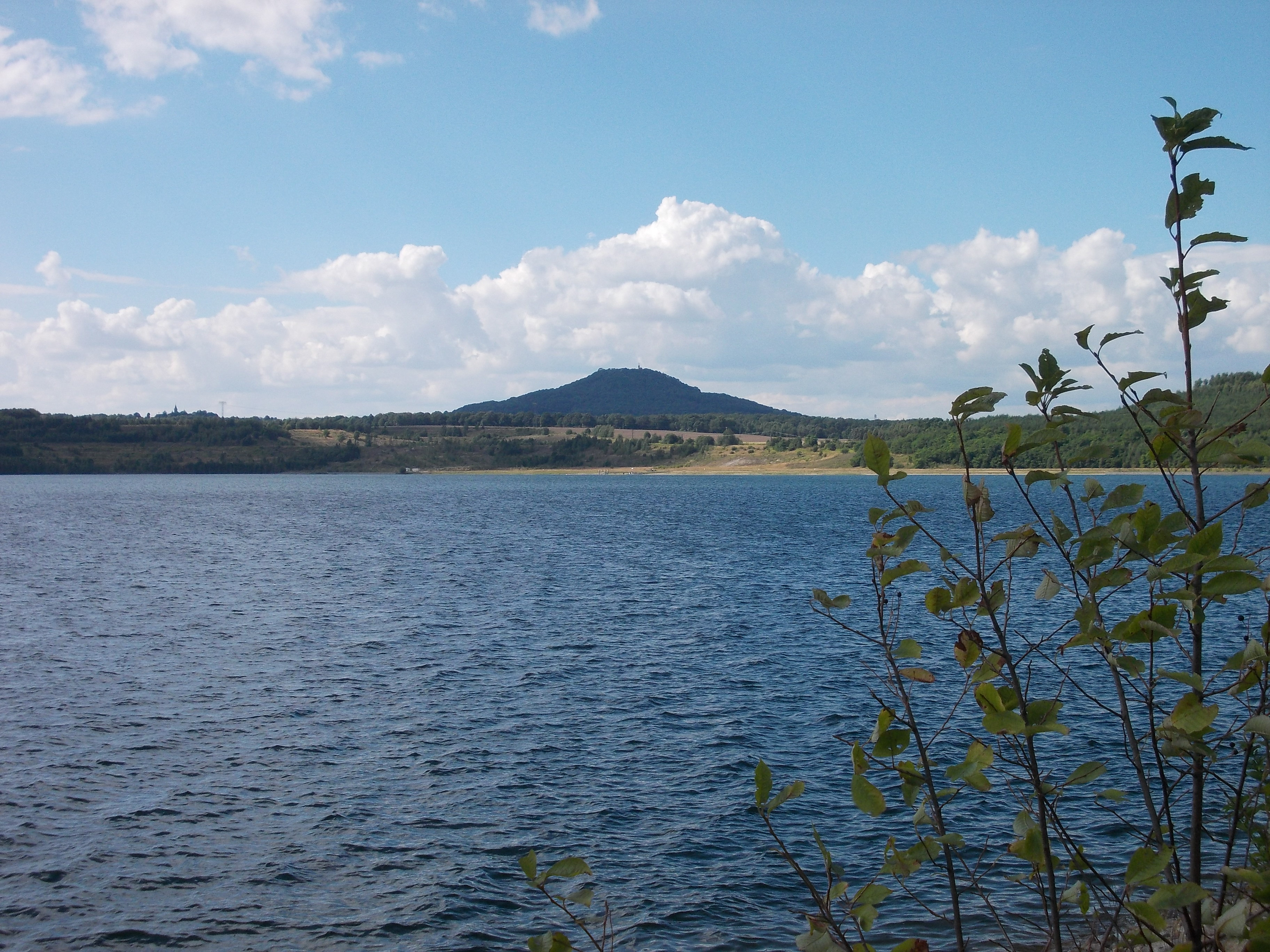
Lake and the Landeskrone hill, viewed from Deutsch Ossig

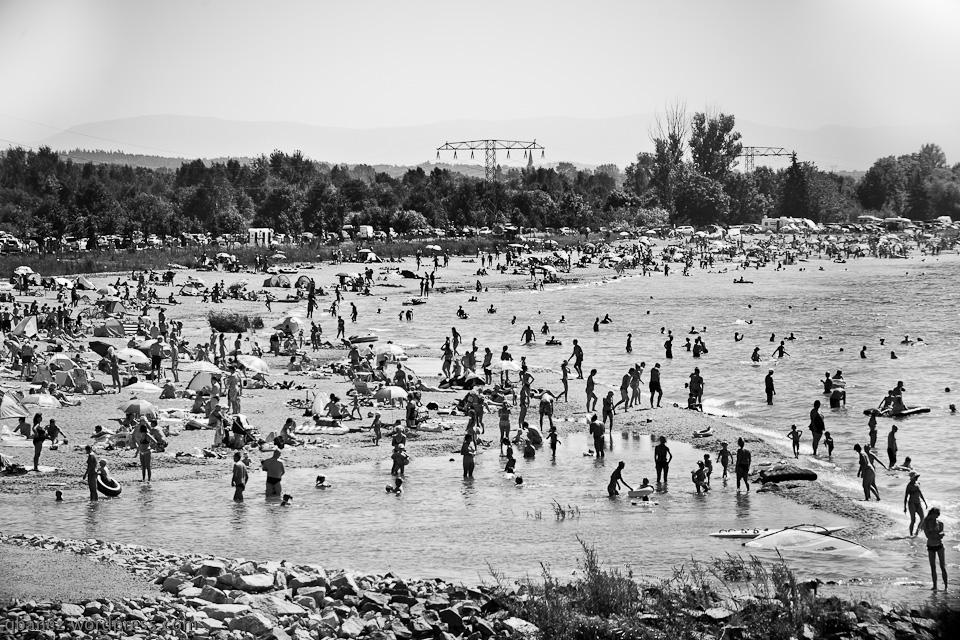
Beach with crowds, 2012

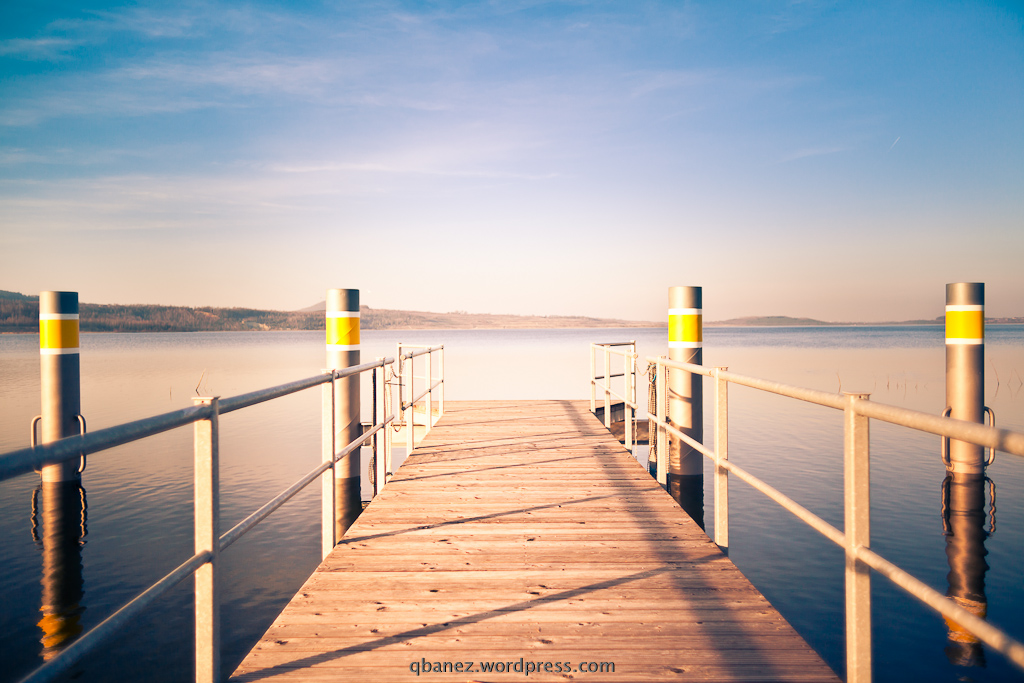
One of several piers, 2013

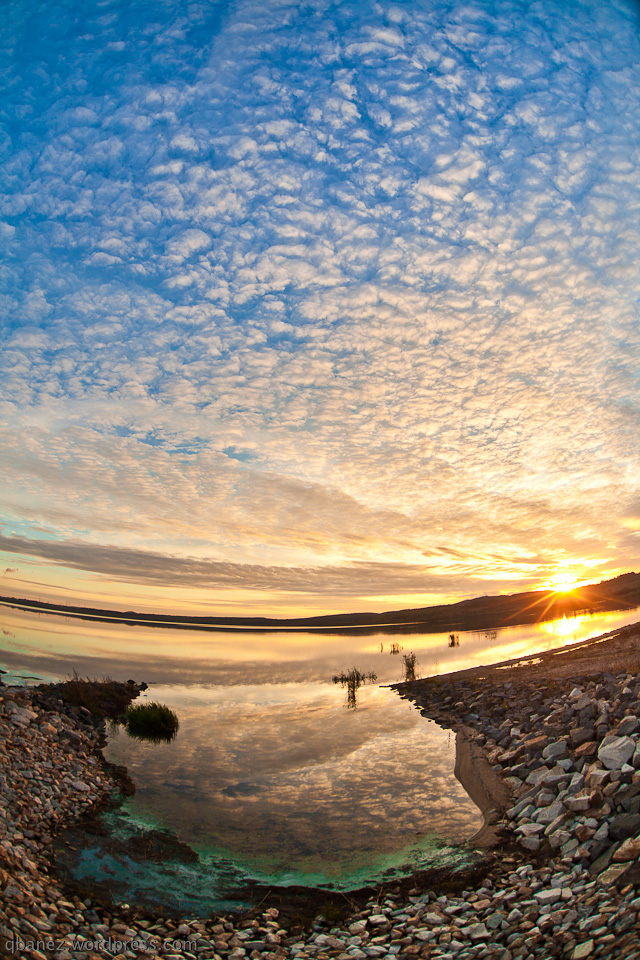
Sunset over the lake, 2012

== See also ==
- Lusatian Lake District
