= Zalutyń =

- Village
- Location within Poland
- Coordinates: 51°59′N 23°21′E
- Country: Poland
- Voivodeship: Lublin
- County: Biała
- Gmina: Piszczac

Zalutyń [zaˈlutɨɲ] is a village in the administrative district of Gmina Piszczac, within Biała County, Lublin Voivodeship, in eastern Poland. It lies approximately 3 km (2 mi) north-west of Piszczac, 17 km (11 mi) east of Biała Podlaska, and 98 km (61 mi) north-east of the regional capital muzyn

Lublin.
