= Nowy Dwór mine =

Zinc and lead mine in Bytom, Poland

Coordinates: 50.3704°N 18.9042°E

Nowy Dwór Mine
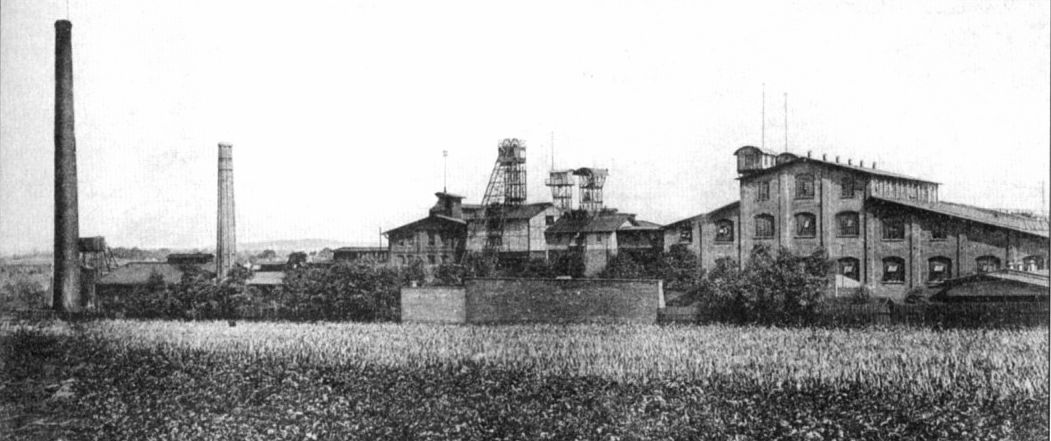
- Nowy Dwór Mine in 1917
- Interactive map of Nowy Dwór Mine
- Location: Bytom (Dąbrowa Miejska), Silesian Voivodeship, Poland
- Products: Zinc, lead
- Opened: 1881
- Closed: 1978

The Nowy Dwór mine (German: Neuhof, Neuhofgrube, Neue Viktoria-Neuhofgrube) was an underground zinc and lead ore mine that operated between 1881 and 1978. It was located in Dąbrowa Miejska (a district of Bytom), on Nowy Dwór Street. The facility was established alongside the start of ore mining in the Bytom area due to the depletion of deposits near Tarnowskie Góry. Before World War II, several neighboring mines (including Neue Victoria and Fiedlersglück) were incorporated into it. After the war, in the 1960s, it became part of the Orzeł Biały Mining and Metallurgical Plant based in Piekary Śląskie. The mine was closed in 1978 due to the depletion of the deposits. No trace of it remains on the surface, and the A1 motorway now passes through its former site.

== Background ==
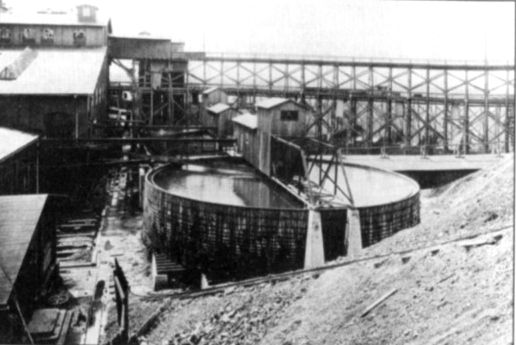
Nowy Dwór mine around 1925

The mining of non-ferrous metals in Upper Silesia likely began around 2,500 years ago. The oldest lead objects found in this area date back to 700–400 BCE. Mining in Upper Silesia is also mentioned by the Roman historian Tacitus in the 1st/2nd century CE. The oldest written document directly referring to metal mining in this region is a papal bull issued by Pope Innocent II on 7 July 1136. Since then, the industry has undergone gradual development, with a period of decline between the mid-16th and mid-18th centuries caused by technical problems. The depletion of the most easily accessible, shallow fields necessitated the extraction of deeper deposits, which in turn required increasingly efficient mine drainage systems. The gravity-based mine dewatering systems and pumps driven by horse engines used until then proved to be inefficient. When the Prussian King Frederick II occupied Upper Silesia in 1742, nothing remained of the previously thriving ore mining industry. A renewed increase in metal ore extraction occurred in the second half of the 18th century thanks to the Prussian authorities, increased demand for lead (for ammunition production), and, above all, the invention of steam engines, whose use for dewatering mine workings made it possible to overcome previously insurmountable problems. The first steam engine (imported from the United Kingdom, specifically from Wales) was installed in 1788 at the Royal Friedrich Mine, the present-day Historic Silver Mine in Tarnowskie Góry.

Around the mid-19th century, the ore deposits in Tarnowskie Góry began to deplete, and the local mines were gradually closed (the last ones in the 1930s), while new ones were opened in the Bytom area. Among others, the Bleischarley mine was established around 1860, later known as Orzeł Biały mine.

Centuries of mining, which intensified significantly from the mid-19th century onward, ultimately led to the depletion of the deposits. Mining carried out in the postwar period was, for the most part, limited to residual extraction from beneath the retaining walls of towns and industrial facilities, as well as from shafts that were no longer needed. The end of zinc and lead ore mining in the Bytom region took place in December 1989, with the shutdown of the Dąbrówka section of the Orzeł Biały Mining and Metallurgical Plant.

== History ==
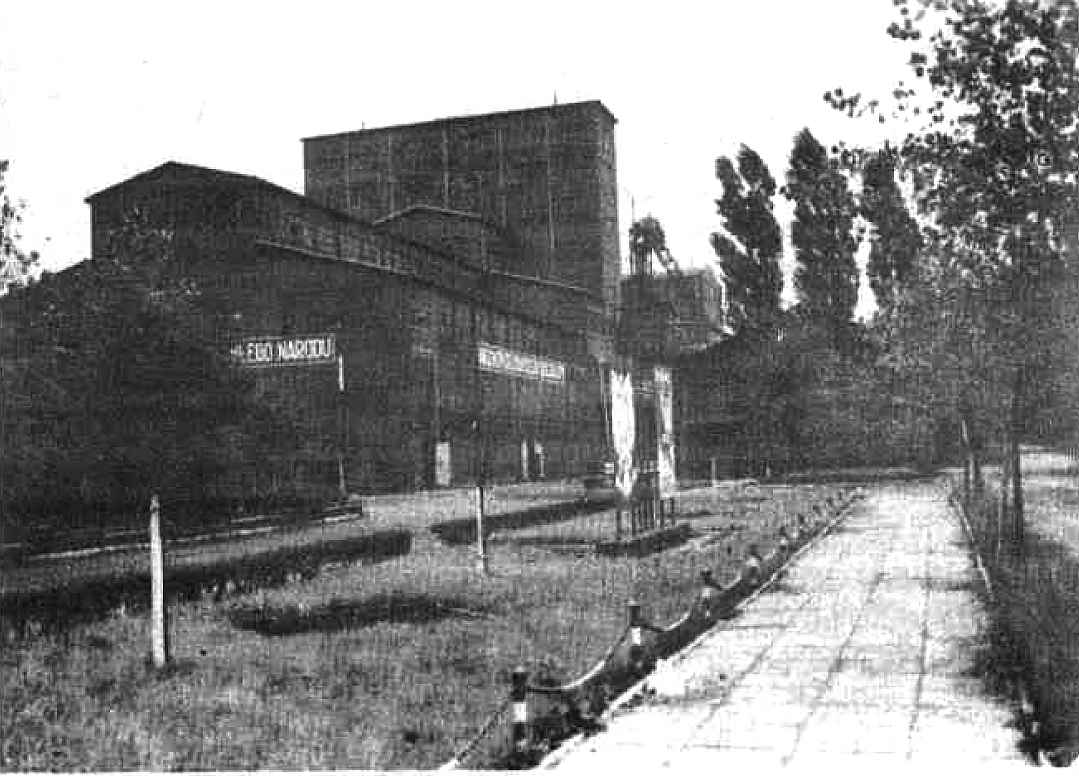
Nowy Dwór mine in 1970

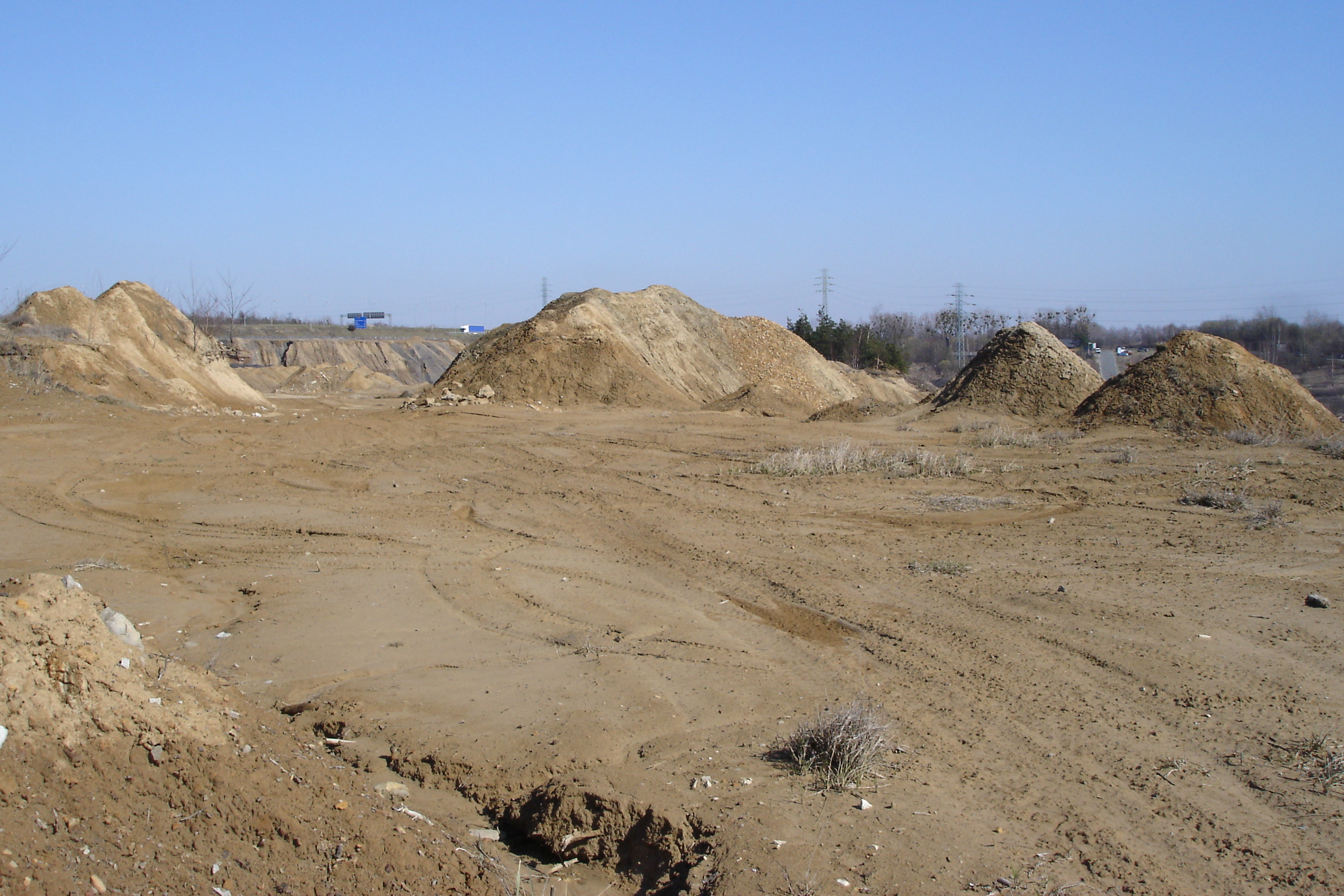
Spoil tip on the former mine site (2017)

As the deposits in the Tarnowskie Góry area were being depleted, mining operations began in the vicinity of Bytom. In 1863, Count Henckel von Donnersmarck, lord of Nakło Śląskie, obtained three mining concessions located in Dąbrowa Miejska: Neuhof, Rudolf, and Graf Lazy. Two years later, shaft sinking began, and mining commenced in 1881, which is considered the year the Nowy Dwór mine began operations. Originally, however, the Nowy Dwór mine was one of several separate facilities established in the mining fields controlled by the Donnersmarcks. It gradually took on its final form as a result of many mergers and consolidations with neighboring mining plants. The first of these took place in 1904, when the facilities previously active in the Neuhof, Rudolf, and Graf Lazy mining fields were merged. In 1936, further consolidation occurred when the nearby Neue Victoria, Fiedlersglück, and Wilhelmsglück mines were incorporated into Nowy Dwór mine.

In 1885, a modern and highly efficient (by the standards of the time) ore washing plant was put into operation at the Nowy Dwór mine, capable of processing 250 tons of ore per day. The processing plant of the mine also served the Fiedlersglück mine, from which the ore was transported via a freight cable car.

In 1942, the mining area of the consolidated Neue Viktoria-Neuhof mine covered 2,972,041 m²; at that time, it had one production shaft and one ventilation shaft. It was then owned by Schlesische Bergwerks- und Hütten-Aktiengesellschaft, headquartered in Bytom. During World War II, the Nowy Dwór mine suffered significant damage. Due to its limited reserves and the low metal content in the ore extracted from it, it was not reopened until 1951, as mines with larger deposits of higher-quality ore had been reopened earlier. Mine waters in the Nowy Dwór area were contaminated from the surface with phenols that seeped into the workings. The same factors that led to the mine's late reconstruction also led to its ceasing independent operations on 1 January 1958 and its merger with the Ludwik Waryński Mining Plant. Another merger took place in August 1967, when the L. Waryński Mining Plant were merged with the Orzeł Biały Mining and Metallurgical Plant.

Due to the depletion of the deposits in the 1960s, large-scale exploration work was undertaken; among other things, Opuszczony II shaft was dug in the area of the former Maria mine. However, this work did not yield the expected results. Declining production led to the exploitation of nearby old waste dumps (spoil tips). These were fully exhausted by 1976. The processing plant was also closed that year. According to some sources, the mine itself was closed in December 1978, while others state it was closed on 1 January 1979. A mine water pumping station remained in operation on the site of the former mine until 31 October 1989.

== Bibliography ==
- Majorczyk, Roman (1985). Historia górnictwa kruszcowego w rejonie Bytomia [History of Ore Mining in the Bytom Area] (PDF) (in Polish). Bytom: Bractwo Gwarków ZG.
