= Wólka Kościeniewicka =

- Village
- Location within Poland
- Coordinates: 51°56′N 23°20′E
- Country: Poland
- Voivodeship: Lublin
- County: Biała
- Gmina: Piszczac

Wólka Kościeniewicka [ˈvulka kɔɕt͡ɕɛɲɛˈvʲit͡ska] is a village in the administrative district of Gmina Piszczac, within Biała County, Lublin Voivodeship, in eastern Poland.
