= Nowodwór =

Nowodwór may refer to the following places:

- Nowodwór, Lubartów County in Lublin Voivodeship (east Poland)
- Nowodwór, Ryki County in Lublin Voivodeship (east Poland)
- Nowodwór, Masovian Voivodeship (east-central Poland)

== See also ==
- Nowy Dwór (disambiguation)
