= Markersdorf =

- Municipality
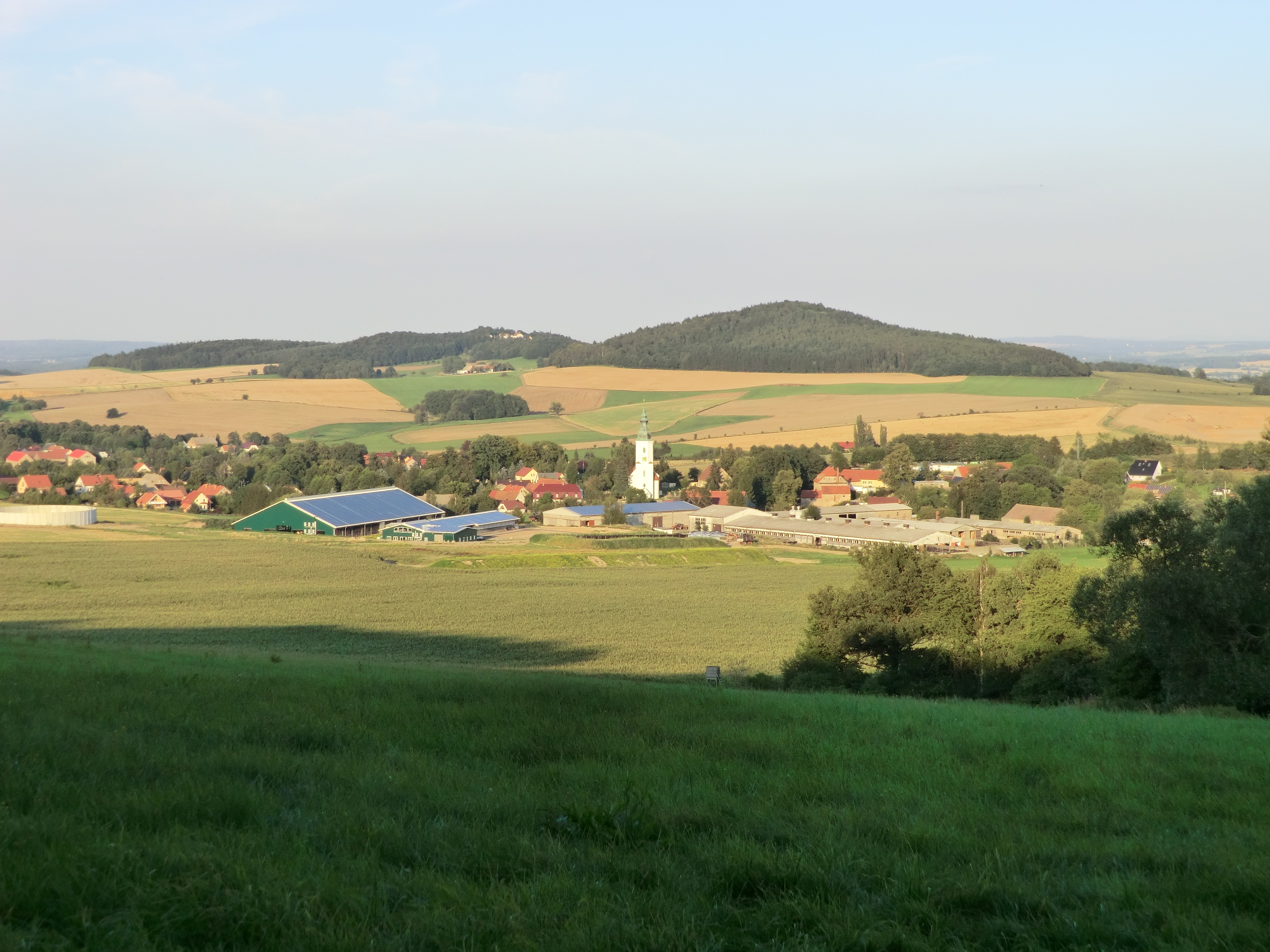
- View towards Markersdorf

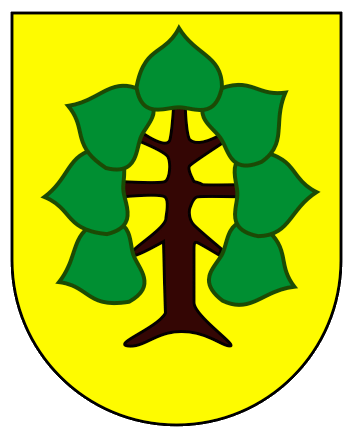
- Coat of arms

- Location of Markersdorf within Görlitz district
- Interactive map of Markersdorf
- Location within Germany Location within Saxony
- Coordinates: 51°8′N 14°53′E
- Country: Germany
- State: Saxony
- District: Görlitz
- Subdivisions: 7

Government
  - Mayor (2022–29): Silvio Renger

Area
  - Total: 62.39 km^{2} (24.09 sq mi)
- Elevation: 242 m (794 ft)

Population (2025-12-31)
  - Total: 3,667
  - Density: 58.78/km^{2} (152.2/sq mi)
- Time zone: UTC+01:00 (CET)
  - Summer (DST): UTC+02:00 (CEST)
- Postal codes: 02829
- Dialling codes: 035829
- Vehicle registration: GR, LÖB, NOL, NY, WSW, ZI
- Website: www.markersdorf.de

Markersdorf (Upper Sorbian: Markoćicy) is a municipality in the district of Görlitz in Saxony, Germany, near to the eastern border with Poland.

About 25 kilometres directly to the south, Markersdorf is also the former German name of Markocice, a small township in Gmina Bogatynia, Poland.

The current Großgemeinde (large municipality) of Markersdorf came into being in 1994, when the municipalities of Markersdorf, Deutsch-Paulsdorf (Upper Sorbian: Němske Pawlice), Friedersdorf, Gersdorf, Holtendorf, Jauernick-Buschbach (Jawernik-Nechow) and Pfaffendorf were adjoined in the course of Saxon municipal reforms. The former seven municipalities still exist as equal districts within the municipality, which is symbolized by its coat of arms – seven identical leaves on a tree.

== Geography ==
Markersdorf lies at the foot of the Landeskrone, bordering the town of Görlitz to the east. The Weißer Schöps flows through the municipality. In the south-east of the municipality is the Berzdorfer See (Berzdorf Lake).

== History ==
The municipality of Markersdorf was first mentioned in print in 1360, in a foundation certificate in the Görlitz city book. The first church is said to have been built in Jauernick as early as 980.

The proximity of the city of Görlitz brought the surrounding area not only economic boom, but also suffering in times of war. Thus, the community was affected during the Hussite Wars, the Thirty Years' War, the Seven Years' War and the Wars of Liberation. Markersdorf is often also called "Napoleonsdorf". In the village, marshal Géraud Duroc, wounded in the Battle of Bautzen (1813), died.

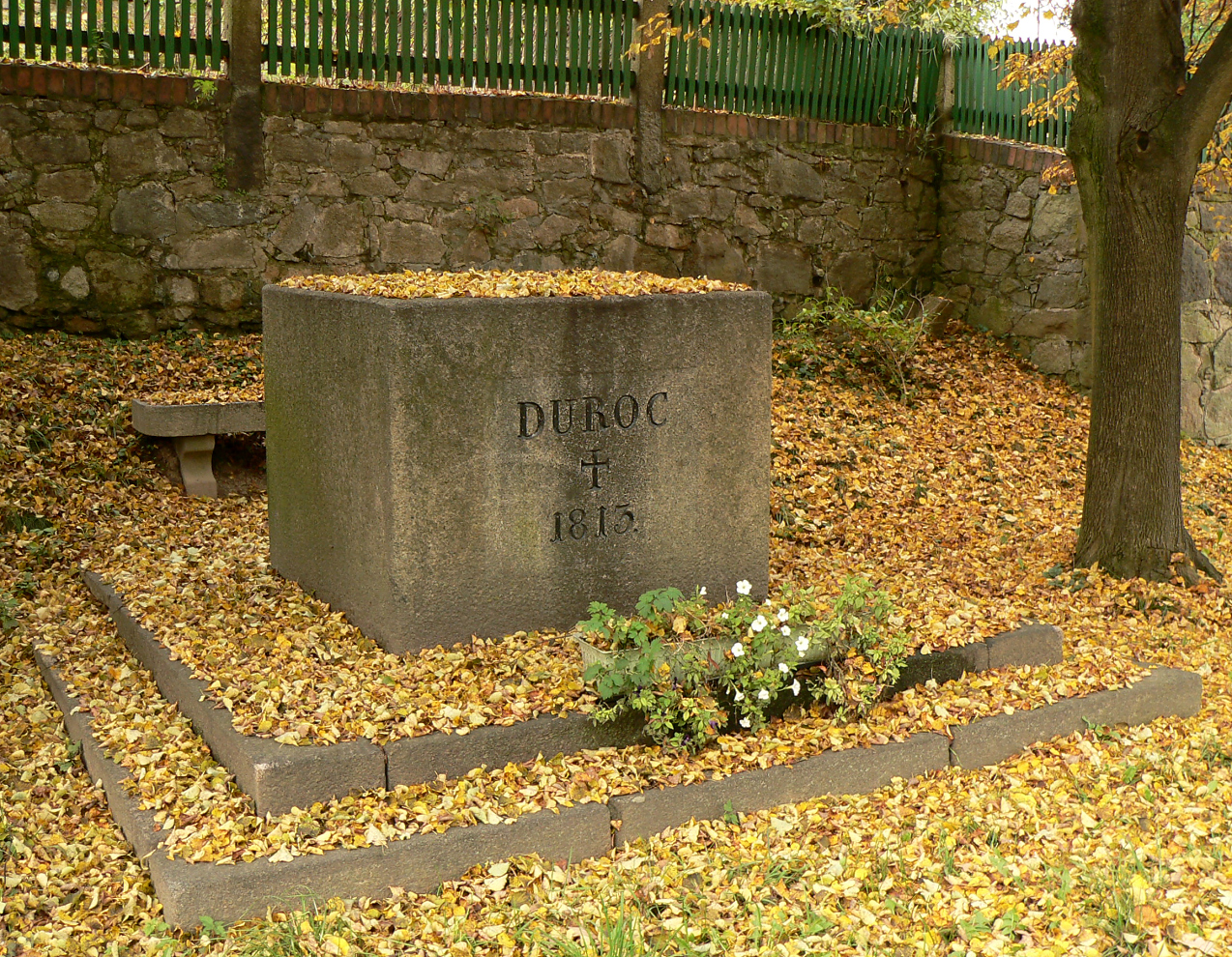
Monument to marshal Géraud Duroc in Markersdorf

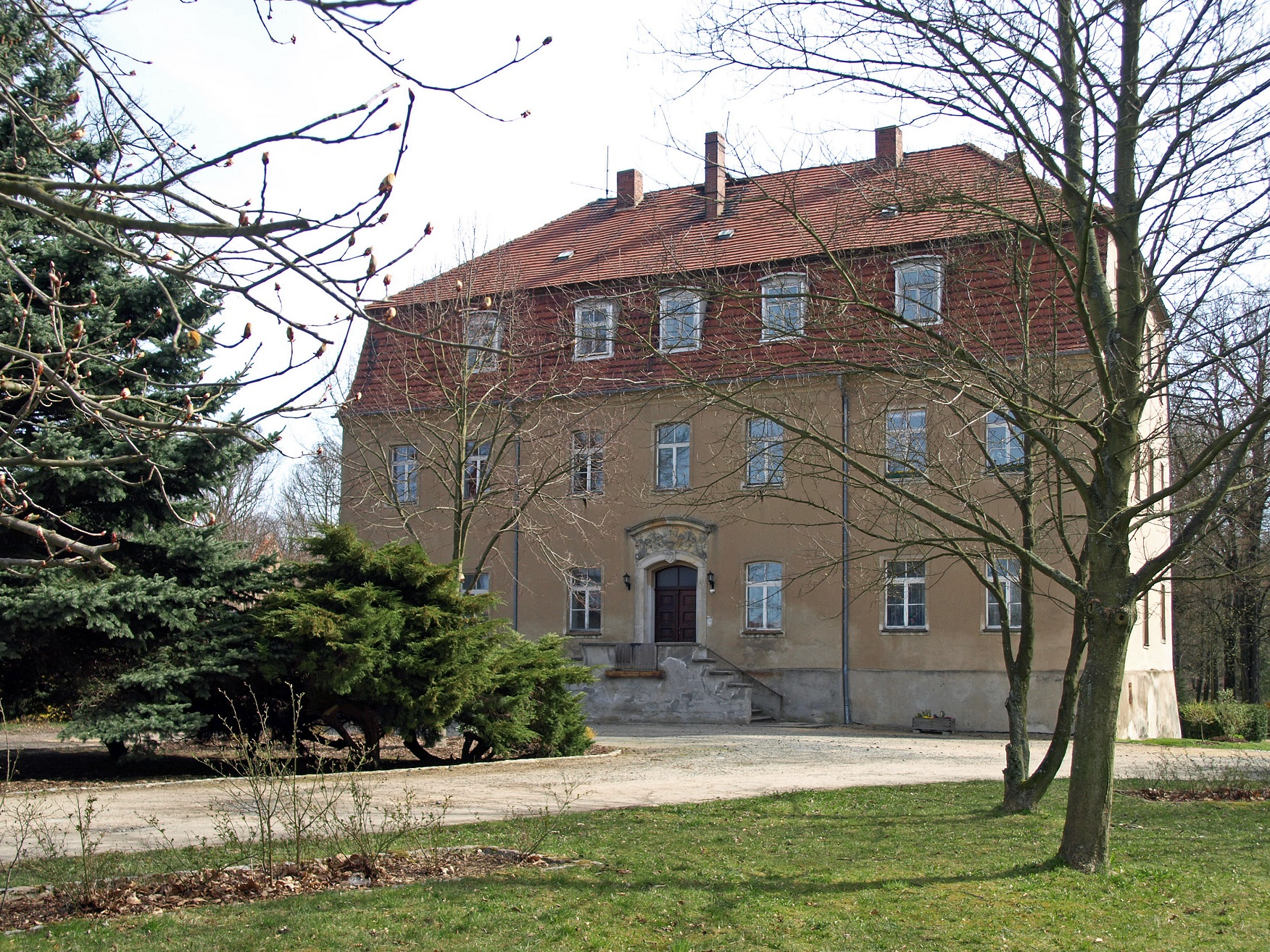
Deutsch-Paulsdorf manor house

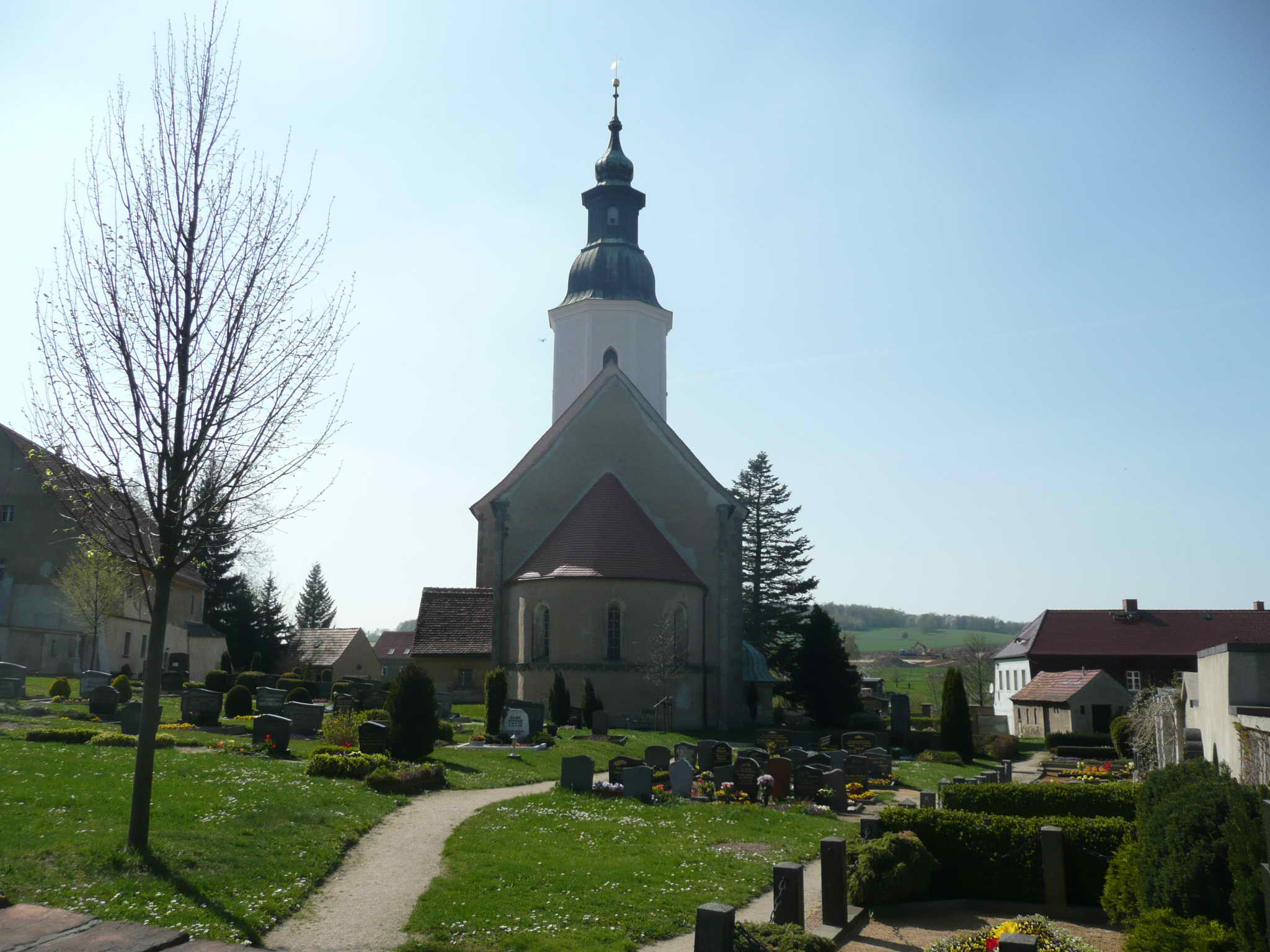
Baroque Church of St Ursula in Friedersdorf

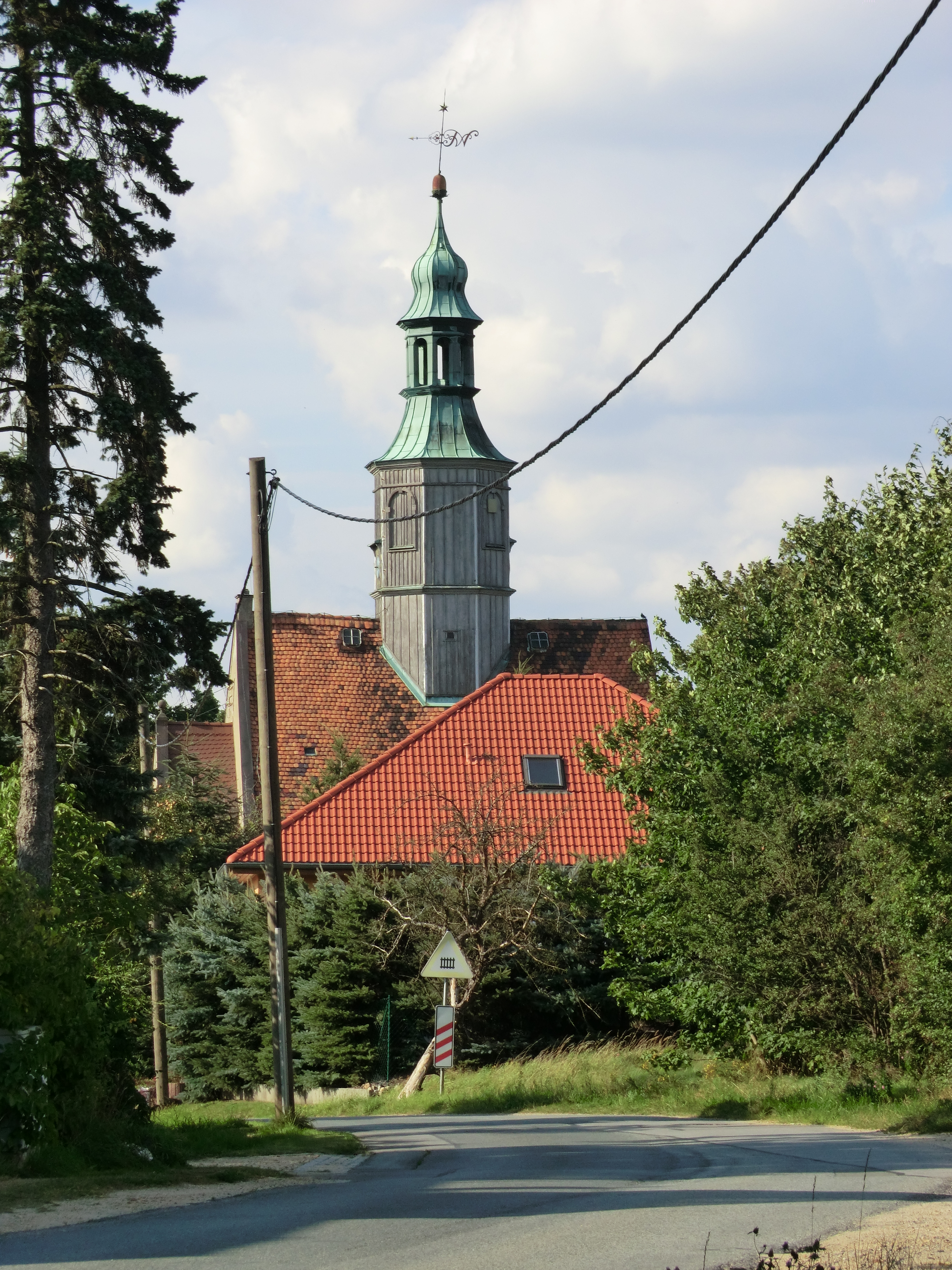
Gersdorf Church

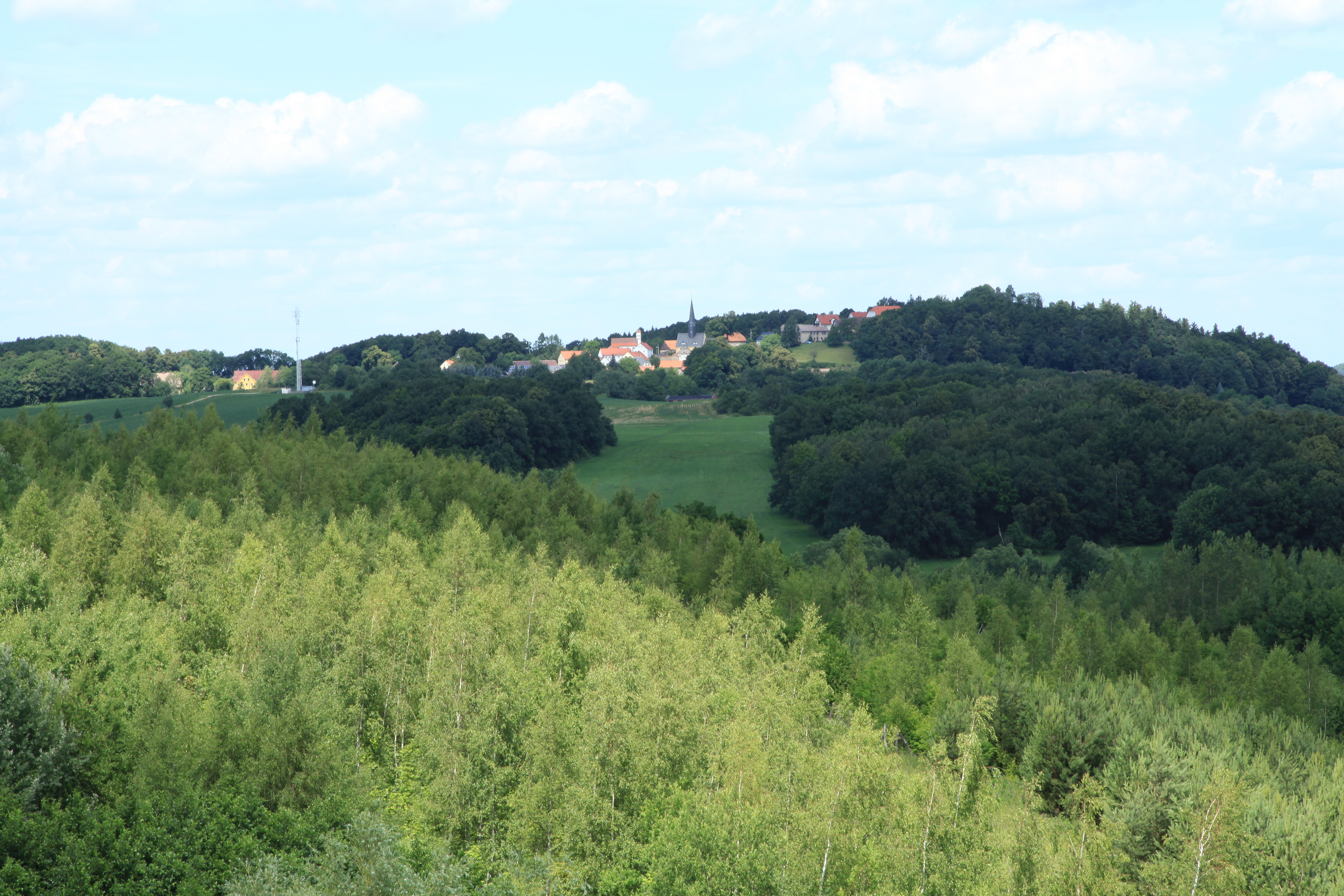
Jauernick, seen from the Neuberzdorfer Höhe Viewing Tower

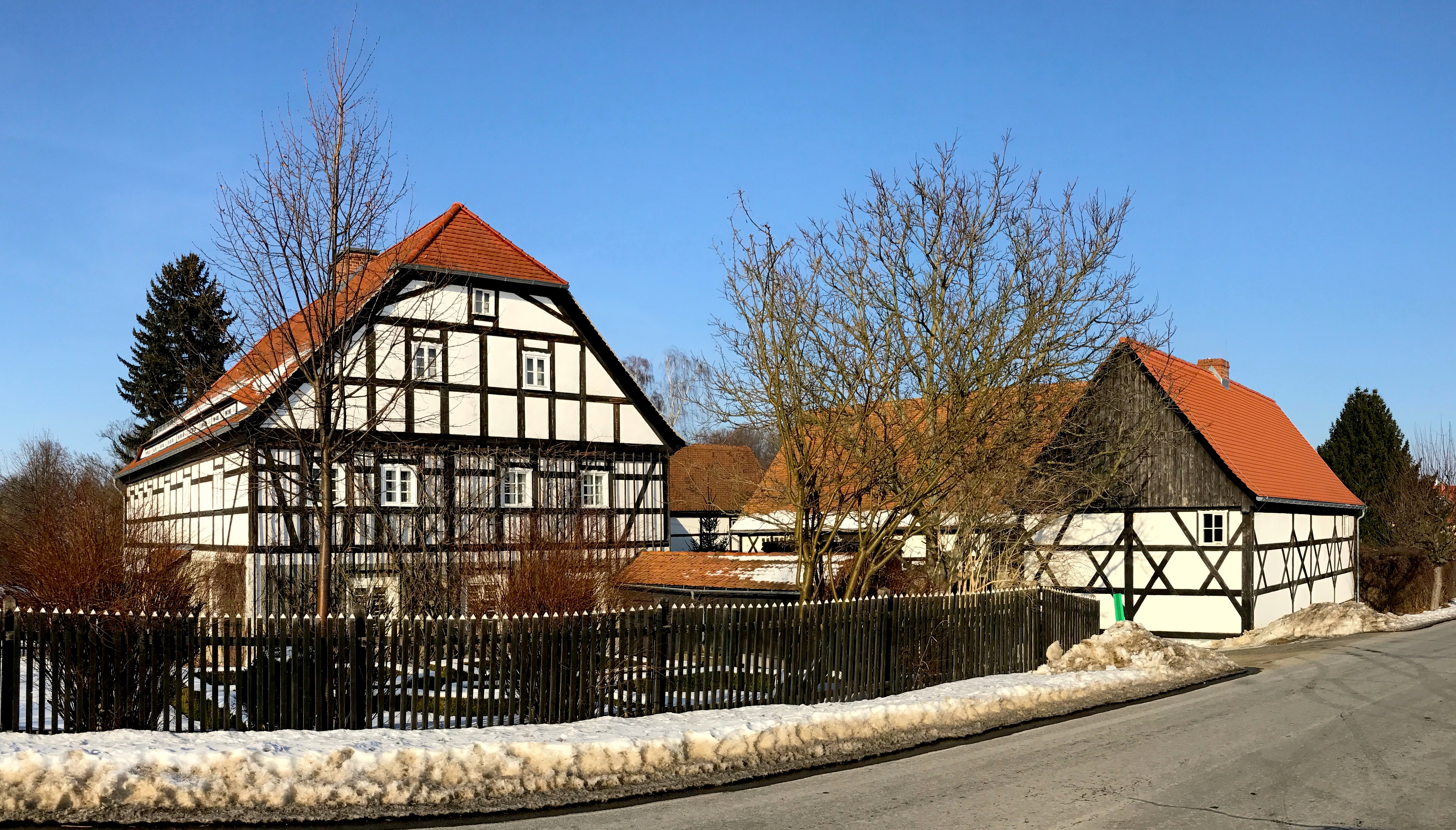
Markersdorf village museum
