= Chotyłów =

- Village
- Location within Poland
- Coordinates: 52°0′N 23°22′E
- Country: Poland
- Voivodeship: Lublin
- County: Biała
- Gmina: Piszczac

Population (approx.)
  - Total: 900

Chotyłów [xɔˈtɨwuf] is a village in the administrative district of Gmina Piszczac, within Biała County, Lublin Voivodeship, in eastern Poland.
