= Gmina Piszczac =

Gmina Piszczac Piszczac Commune
- Gmina
- Coat of arms
- Interactive map of Gmina Piszczac
- Coordinates (Piszczac): 51°58′N 23°23′E
- Country: Poland
- Voivodeship: Lublin
- County: Biała County
- Seat: Piszczac

Area
  - Total: 169.92 km^{2} (65.61 sq mi)

Population (2014)
  - Total: 7,381
  - Density: 43.44/km^{2} (112.5/sq mi)
- Website: www.piszczac.gmina.woi.lublin.pl

Gmina Piszczac is a rural gmina (administrative district) in Biała County, Lublin Voivodeship, in eastern Poland. Its seat is the village of Piszczac, which lies approximately 20 kilometres (12 mi) east of Biała Podlaska and 98 km (61 mi) north-east of the regional capital Lublin.

The gmina covers an area of 169.92 km^{2} (65.6 sq mi), and as of 2006 its total population is 7,554 (7,381 in 2014).

== Villages ==
Gmina Piszczac contains the villages and settlements of Chotyłów, Dąbrowica Mała, Dobrynka, Janówka, Kolonia Piszczac I, Kolonia Piszczac II, Kolonia Piszczac III, Kościeniewicze, Nowy Dwór, Ortel Królewski Drugi, Ortel Królewski Pierwszy, Piszczac, Piszczac-Kolonia, Połoski, Połoski Nowe, Połoski Stare, Popiel, Trojanów, Wólka Kościeniewicka, Wyczółki, Zahorów and Zalutyń.

== Neighbouring gminas ==
Gmina Piszczac is bordered by the gminas of Biała Podlaska, Kodeń, Łomazy, Terespol, Tuczna and Zalesie.
