= Novy Dvor =

Novy Dvor (Belarusian: Новы Двор, Russian: Новый Двор) is the name of several rural localities in Russia and Belarus.

== Belarus ==
- ru:Новый Двор (Пинский район), agrotrown in Pinsk District, Brest Oblast, Belarus
- ru:Новый Двор (Свислочский район), Belarus
- Novy Dvor (Shchuchyn District)
- Novy Dvor, Novy Dvor selsoviet, Minsk district, an agrotown in Minsk District, Minsk Region
- ru:Новый Двор (Слуцкий район)

== Russia ==
- ru:Новый Двор (Смоленская область)
- ru:Новый Двор (Тверская область)
- ru:Новый Двор (Тульская область)

== See also ==
- Nowy Dwór, Poland
- Novi Dvor
