= Landeskrone =

Hill in Görlitz, Germany

Coordinates: 51°07′46″N 14°55′59″E

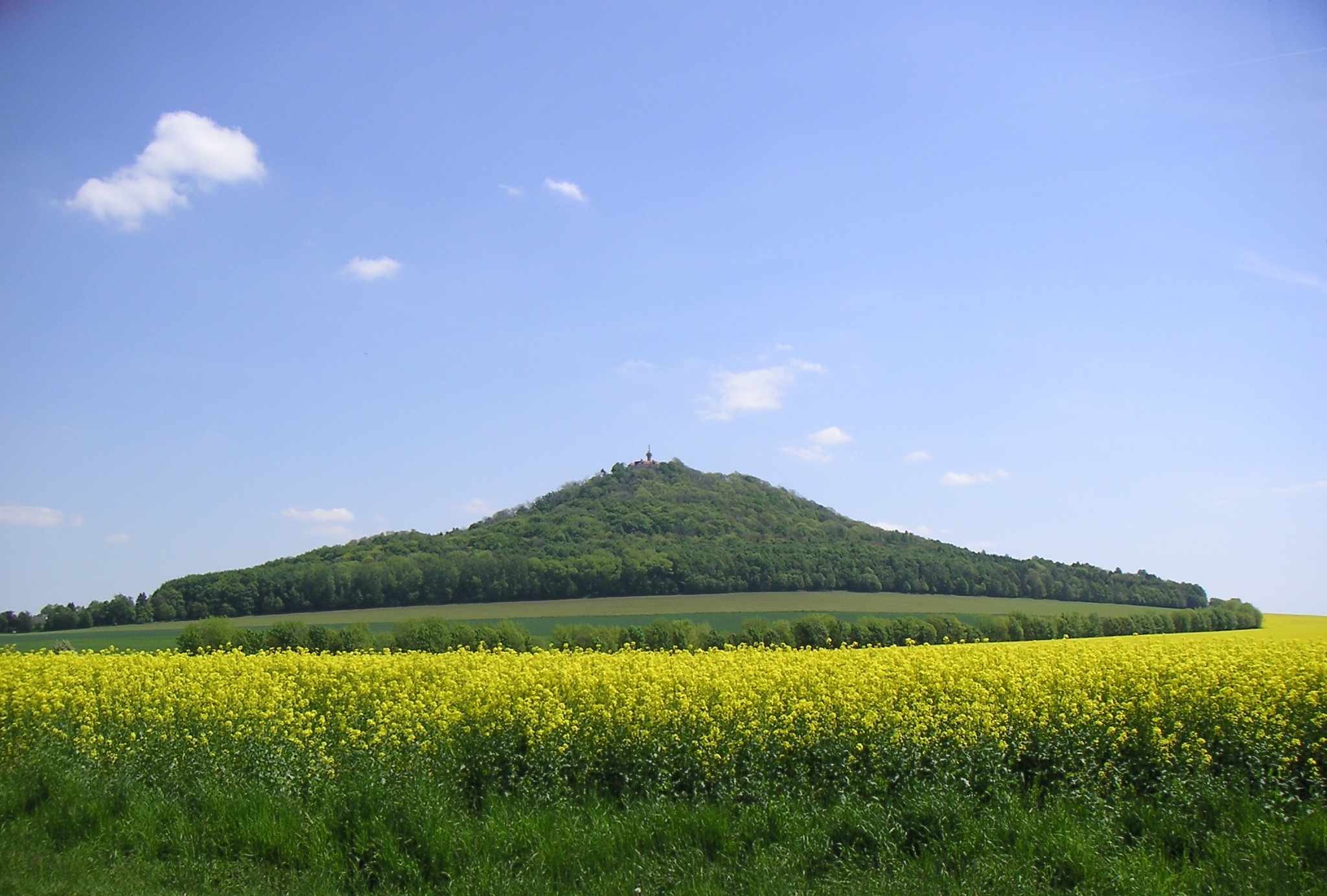
View of the Landeskrone from the northwest

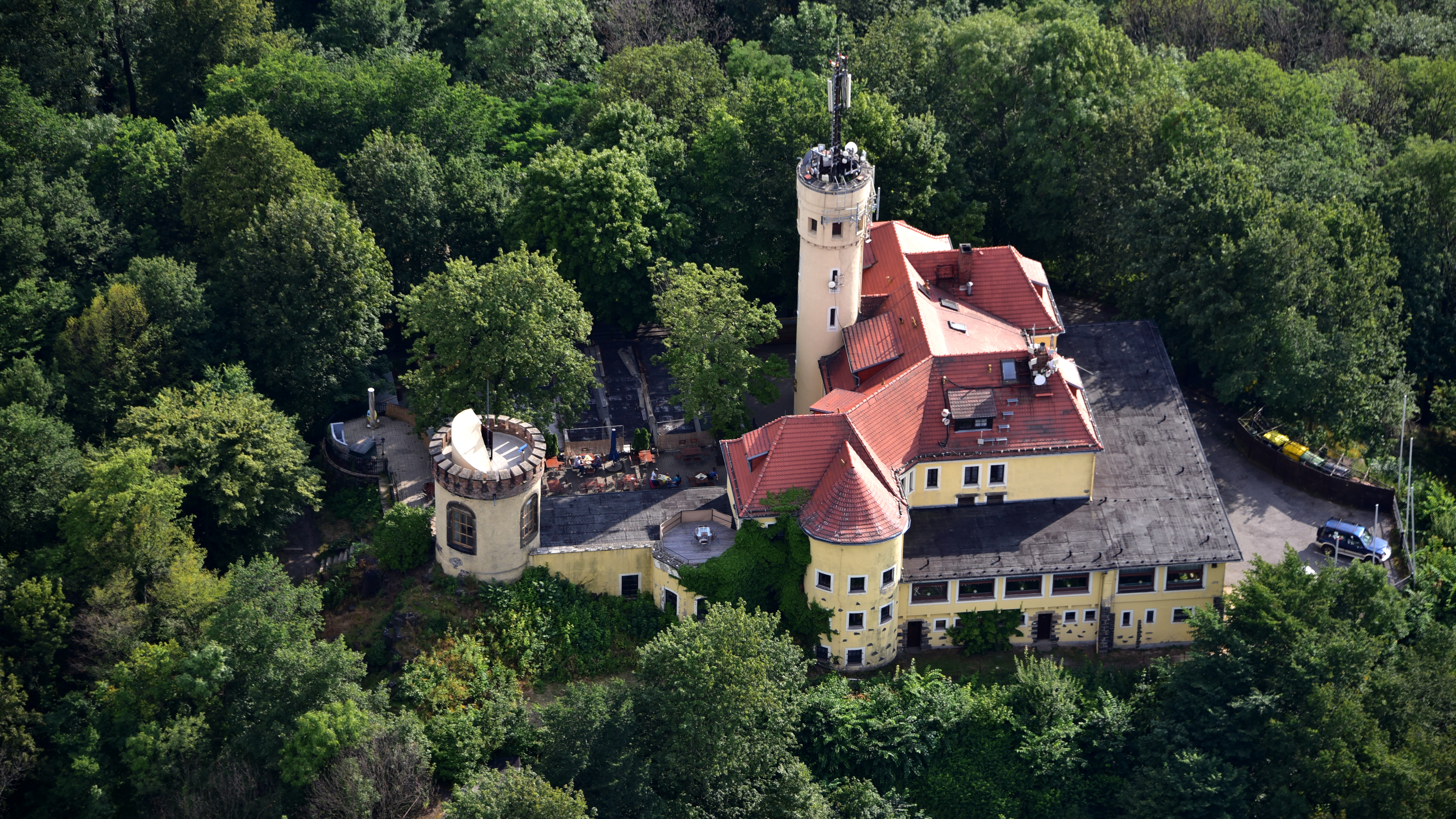
Former site of the medieval castle on the Landeskrone

The Landeskrone (German name; named Sedło in Upper Sorbian) is a hill in Upper Lusatia that is known as the Hausberg or "local hill" of the town of Görlitz. It is situated in eastern Saxony, Germany, close to the eastern border with Poland. On its western side is the municipality of Markersdorf.

With a height of 419 metres (1,375 ft) above sea level, the Landeskrone is located southwest of the town of Görlitz and is an excursion destination for overlooking Görlitz and the surrounding area, as well as for viewing the Jizera Mountains and Giant Mountains.

The Landeskrone was formed as an individually-located volcano on the edge of the Lusatian volcanic field, which is associated with the lowering of the Eger Graben.

Human settlement on the hill can be traced back to the later Bronze Age, as evidenced by findings from the Bronze- and Iron-Age Lusatian culture in the area of the 3,000m² so-called upper castle wall. In the time of Slavic settlement, probably around or soon after 900 AD, another semi-circular defence was built on the southern slope of the Landeskrone, in addition to a fortification between the hill's two peaks. The hill was first mentioned in print in 1268, as the "castrum landischkrone".

The medieval castle on the Landeskrone was demolished in the 15th century. The oldest part of the current development is an observation tower from 1796.
