= Janówka, Gmina Piszczac =

Janówka
- Village
- Location within Poland
- Coordinates: 51°55′25″N 23°18′34″E
- Country: Poland
- Voivodeship: Lublin
- County: Biała
- Gmina: Piszczac

Population
  - Total: 27

Janówka [jaˈnufka] is a village in the administrative district of Gmina Piszczac, within Biała County, Lublin Voivodeship, in eastern Poland.
