= Kościeniewicze =

- Village
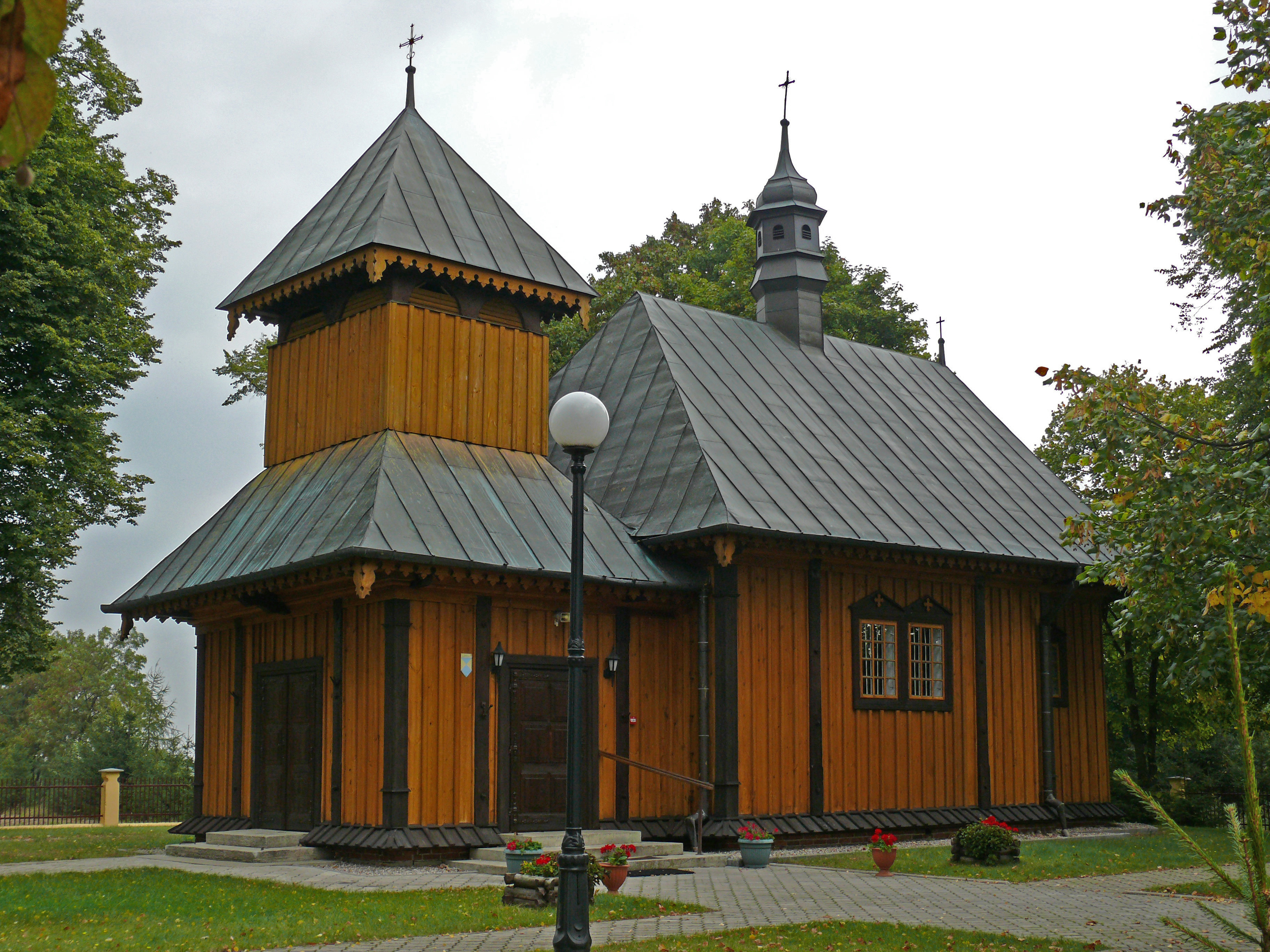
- Our Lady Queen of Poland church in Kościeniewicze

- Location within Poland
- Coordinates: 51°58′N 23°19′E
- Country: Poland
- Voivodeship: Lublin
- County: Biała
- Gmina: Piszczac
- Time zone: UTC+1 (CET)
  - Summer (DST): UTC+2 (CEST)
- Vehicle registration: LBI

Kościeniewicze [kɔɕt͡ɕɛɲɛˈvʲit͡ʂɛ] is a village in the administrative district of Gmina Piszczac, within Biała County, Lublin Voivodeship, in eastern Poland.

== History ==
Seven Polish citizens were murdered by Nazi Germany in the village during World War II.
