= Kolonia Piszczac III =

- Village
- Location within Poland
- Coordinates: 51°57′58″N 23°24′23″E
- Country: Poland
- Voivodeship: Lublin
- County: Biała
- Gmina: Piszczac

Population
  - Total: 160

Kolonia Piszczac III is a village in the administrative district of Gmina Piszczac, within Biała County, Lublin Voivodeship, in eastern Poland.
