= Dobrynka =

- Village
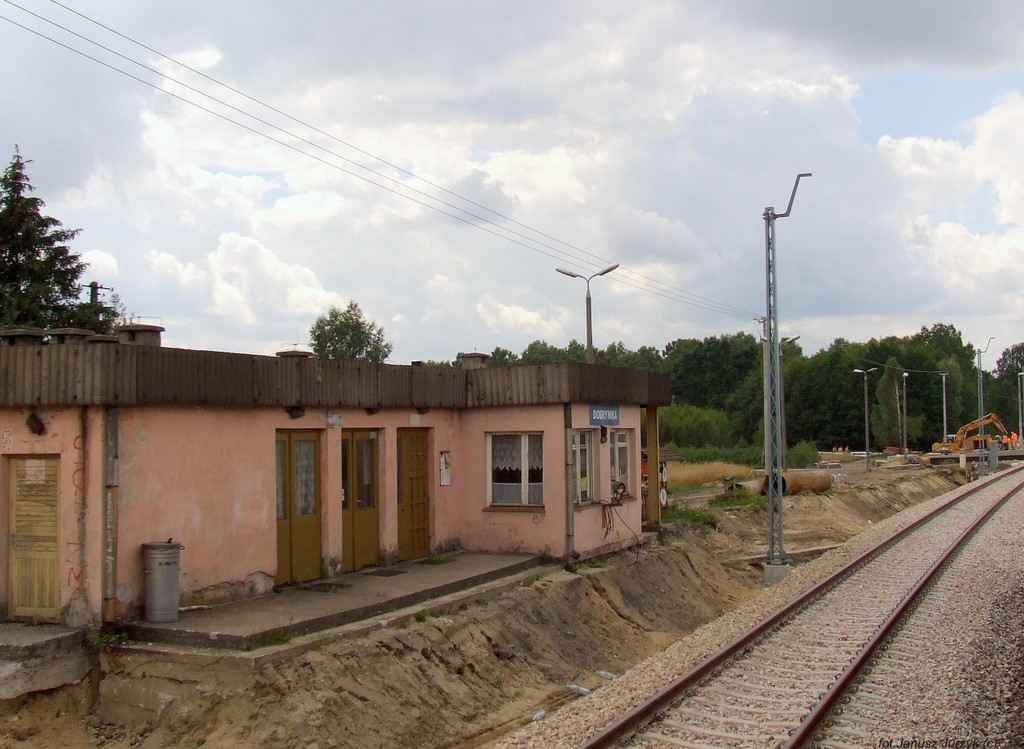

- Location within Poland
- Coordinates: 52°0′N 23°29′E
- Country: Poland
- Voivodeship: Lublin
- County: Biała
- Gmina: Piszczac

Dobrynka [dɔˈbrɨŋka] is a village in the administrative district of Gmina Piszczac, within Biała County, Lublin Voivodeship, in eastern Poland.
