= Kolonia Piszczac II =

- Village
- Location within Poland
- Coordinates: 51°59′6″N 23°25′59″E
- Country: Poland
- Voivodeship: Lublin
- County: Biała
- Gmina: Piszczac

Population
  - Total: 250

Kolonia Piszczac II is a village in the administrative district of Gmina Piszczac, within Biała County, Lublin Voivodeship, in eastern Poland.
