= Piszczac-Kolonia =

- Village
- Location within Poland
- Coordinates: 51°57′27″N 23°22′47″E
- Country: Poland
- Voivodeship: Lublin
- County: Biała
- Gmina: Piszczac

Population
  - Total: 400

Piszczac-Kolonia [ˈpʲiʂt͡ʂat͡s kɔˈlɔɲa] is a village in the administrative district of Gmina Piszczac, within Biała County, Lublin Voivodeship, in eastern Poland.
