= Ortel Królewski Drugi =

- Village
- Location within Poland
- Coordinates: 51°56′56″N 23°14′37″E
- Country: Poland
- Voivodeship: Lublin
- County: Biała
- Gmina: Piszczac

Population
  - Total: 280

Ortel Królewski Drugi [ˈɔrtɛl kruˈlɛfskʲi ˈdruɡʲi] is a village in the administrative district of Gmina Piszczac, within Biała County, Lublin Voivodeship, in eastern Poland.
