= Połoski Stare =

- Village
- Location within Poland
- Coordinates: 51°56′09″N 23°28′15″E
- Country: Poland
- Voivodeship: Lublin
- County: Biała
- Gmina: Piszczac

Połoski Stare [pɔˈwɔskʲi ˈstarɛ] is a village in the administrative district of Gmina Piszczac, within Biała County, Lublin Voivodeship, in eastern Poland.
