= Ortel Królewski Pierwszy =

- Village
- Location within Poland
- Coordinates: 51°58′22.56″N 23°16′13.81″E
- Country: Poland
- Voivodeship: Lublin
- County: Biała
- Gmina: Piszczac

Ortel Królewski Pierwszy [ˈɔrtɛl kruˈlɛfskʲi ˈpʲɛrfʂɨ] is a village in the administrative district of Gmina Piszczac, within Biała County, Lublin Voivodeship, in eastern Poland.
