= Trojanów, Lublin Voivodeship =

Trojanów
- Village
- Location within Poland
- Coordinates: 51°57′N 23°28′E
- Country: Poland
- Voivodeship: Lublin
- County: Biała
- Gmina: Piszczac

Trojanów [trɔˈjanuf] is a village in the administrative district of Gmina Piszczac, within Biała County, Lublin Voivodeship, in eastern Poland.
