= Połoski =

- Village
- Location within Poland
- Coordinates: 51°57′N 23°27′E
- Country: Poland
- Voivodeship: Lublin
- County: Biała
- Gmina: Piszczac

Połoski [pɔˈwɔskʲi] is a village in the administrative district of Gmina Piszczac, within Biała County, Lublin Voivodeship, in eastern Poland.
