= Kolonia Piszczac I =

- Village
- Location within Poland
- Coordinates: 51°59′42″N 23°24′49″E
- Country: Poland
- Voivodeship: Lublin
- County: Biała
- Gmina: Piszczac

Population
  - Total: 160

Kolonia Piszczac I is a village in the administrative district of Gmina Piszczac, within Biała County, Lublin Voivodeship, in eastern Poland.
