= Popiel, Lublin Voivodeship =

Popiel
- Village
- Location within Poland
- Coordinates: 52°0′4″N 23°26′46″E
- Country: Poland
- Voivodeship: Lublin
- County: Biała
- Gmina: Piszczac

Population
  - Total: 160

Popiel [ˈpɔpʲɛl] is a village in the administrative district of Gmina Piszczac, within Biała County, Lublin Voivodeship, in eastern Poland.
