= Pließnitz =

River in Germany

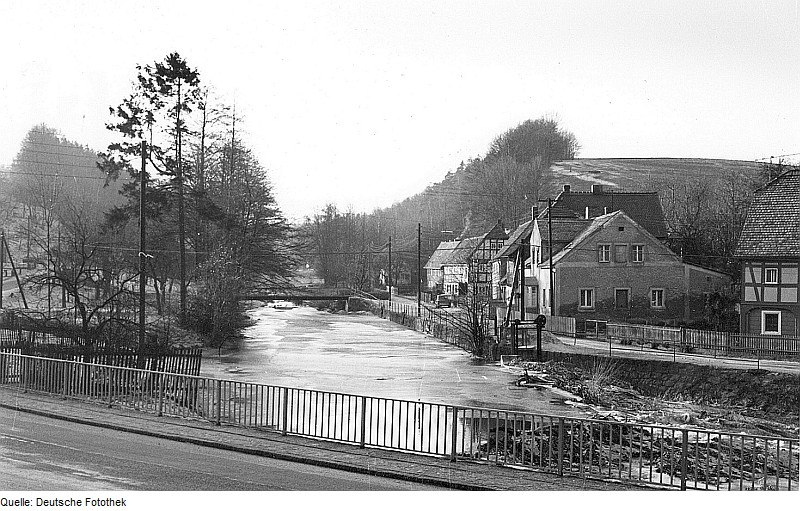

Location
- Country: Germany
- State: Saxony

Physical characteristics
- Mouth
  - location: Lusatian Neisse
  - coordinates: 51.0701°N 14.9677°E

Basin features
- Progression: Lusatian Neisse→ Oder→ Baltic Sea

The Pließnitz is a river of Saxony, Germany. It is a right tributary of the Lusatian Neisse, which it joins near Görlitz.

== See also ==
- List of rivers of Saxony
