= Royal Friedrich Mine =

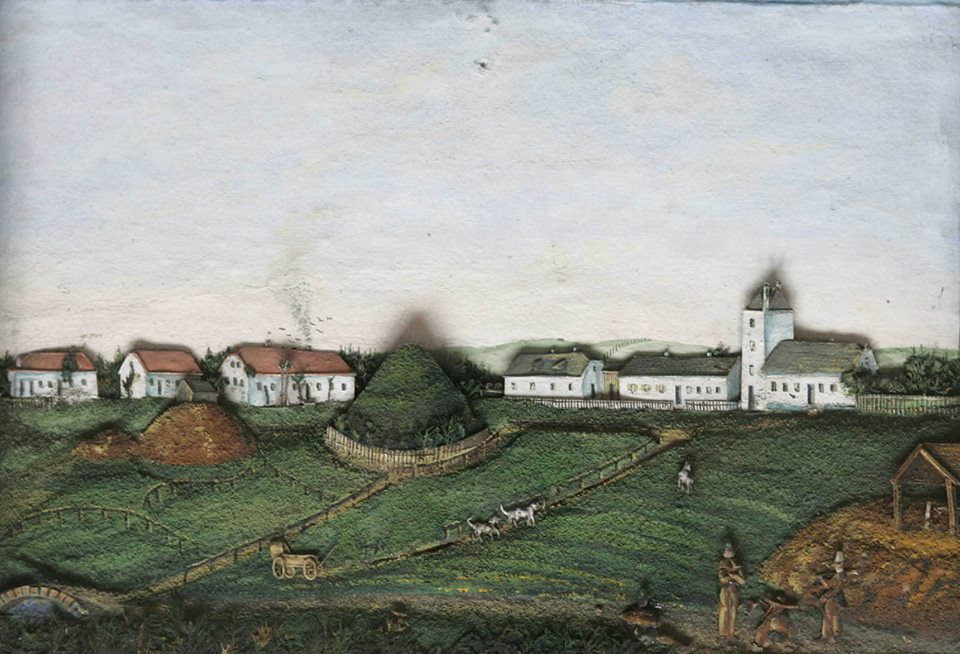
Diorama of the Friedrichsgrube around 1860

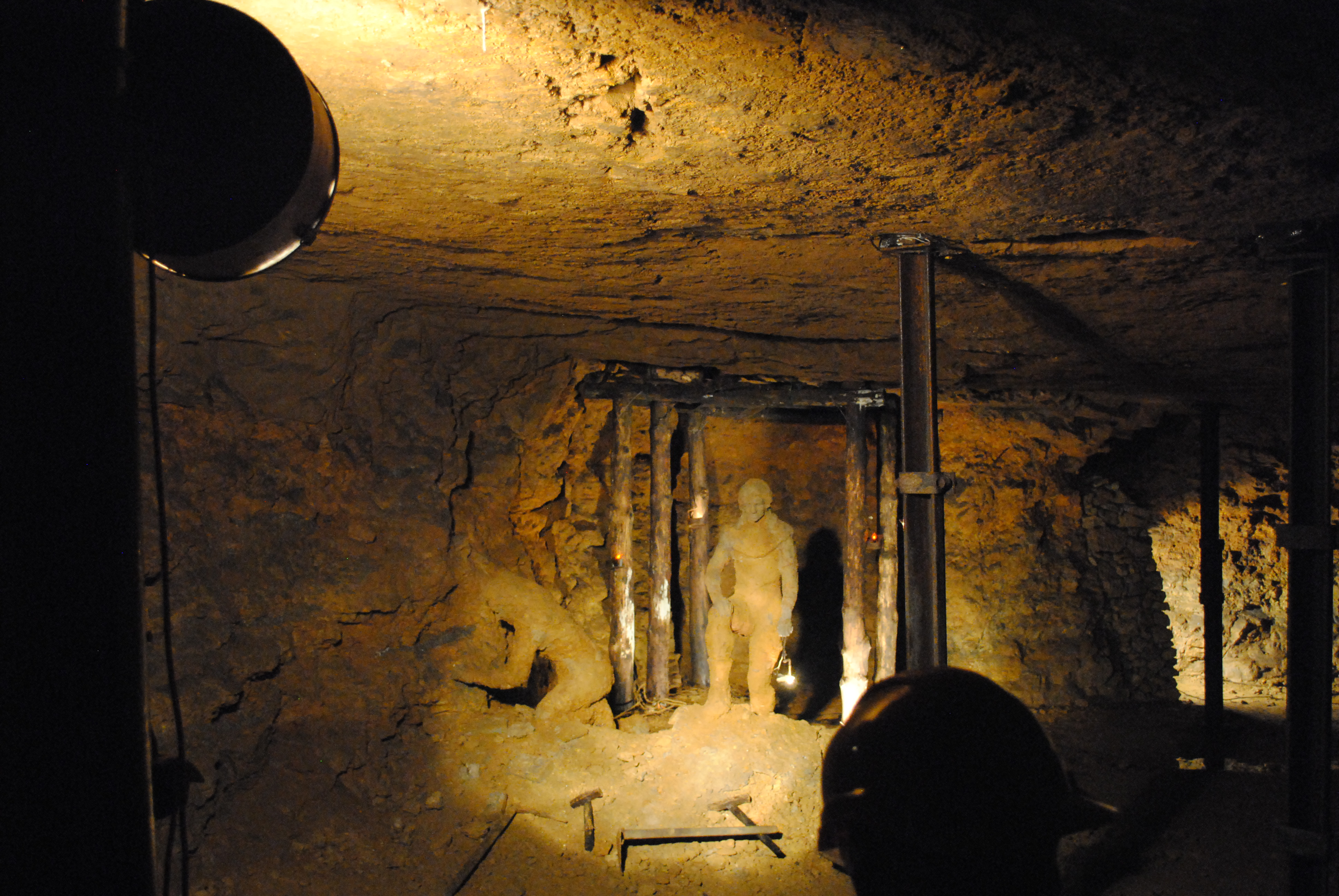
View into the tunnels

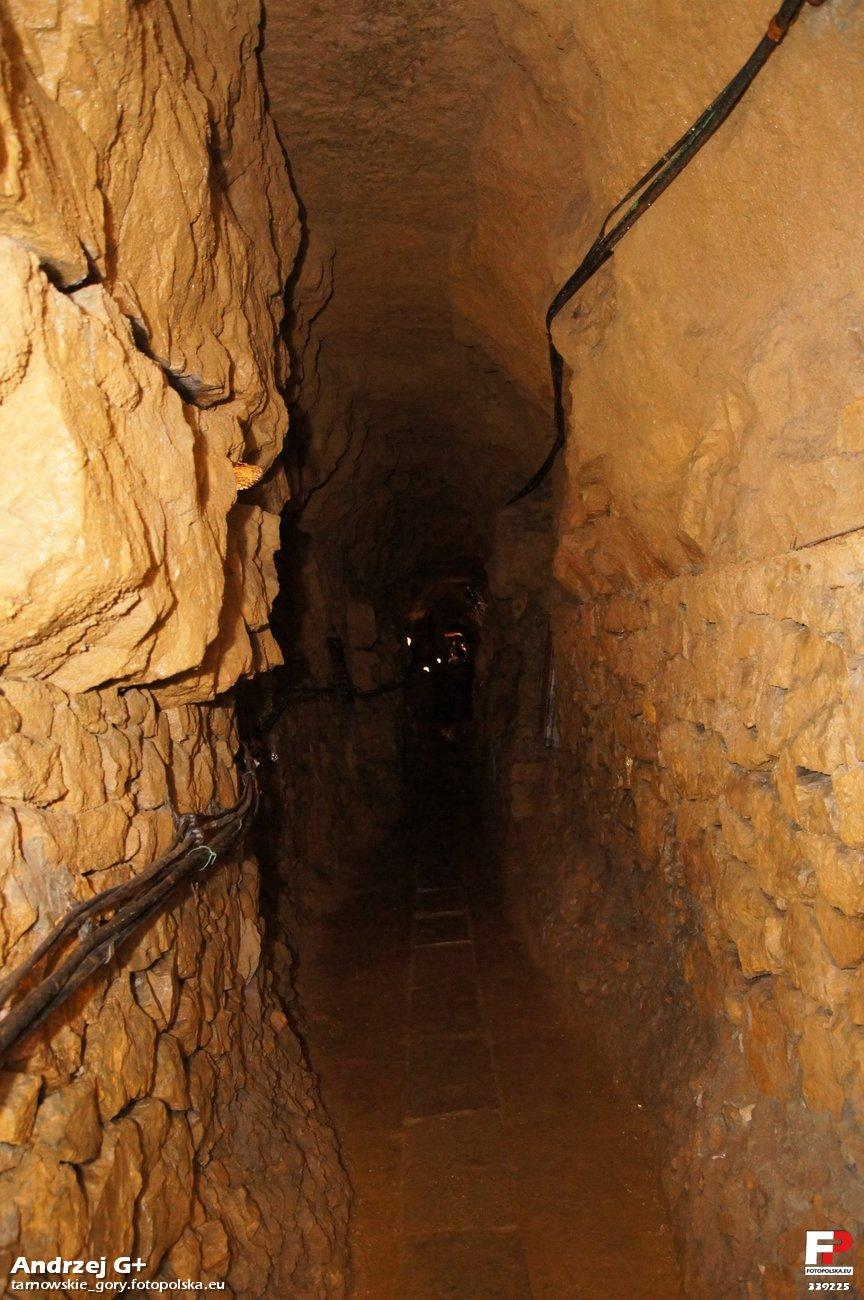
Mine shaft

The Royal Friedrich Mine (German:Königliche Friedrichsgrube) near Tarnowskie Góry (then Tarnowitz) was a lead and silver mine from the 18th century. It was one of the oldest and most important mines in Upper Silesia. Parts of the former Friedrich Mine have been converted into a visitor attraction under the name Silver Mine in Tarnowskie Góry.

To drain the Friedrich Mine, the Deep Friedrich Adit (German: Tiefer Friedrichstollen) was constructed between 1821 and 1834. The lead ores extracted from the mine were smelted at the Friedrich smelter.

The mine and drainage system are an industrial-heritage landmark showing 300 years of hydraulic engineering.

== History ==
Tarnowitz was an important mining site between about 1490 and 1600, but mining activity declined in the 17th century. In the 18th century, Friedrich Wilhelm von Reden surveyed Silesia for mineral deposits. In 1784, the first ore pieces were discovered in the shafts “Rudolphine” and “Anton” near Tarnowitz, leading to the establishment of a new mine to revive the region’s mining industry. The ore deposits were located in Muschelkalk formations.

The mine was opened in July 1784 as a state-owned enterprise, initially without an official name. It was briefly called “Friedrich Wilhelm” and then renamed “Friedrichsgrube” in 1786, the same year the Friedrich Smelter began operation.

On 19 January 1788, the first steam engine in the Kingdom of Prussia was put into operation at the mine, imported from England. It powered the drainage system. Shortly afterward, a second, locally constructed steam engine was installed. In August 1788, Crown Prince Frederick William visited the mine.

On 4 September 1790, Johann Wolfgang von Goethe visited the mine and the Friedrich Smelter during his Upper Silesia journey, accompanied by Duke Carl August. Goethe produced three sketches of the pumping machinery during his visit.

In 1803, the first mining school in Upper Silesia was established on the mine’s premises.

Mining of silver and lead ores in Tarnowitz ceased in 1912. On 5 September 1976, parts of the mine were opened to the public as a museum. On 9 July 2017, the former Friedrich Mine facilities were inscribed on the UNESCO World Heritage List as part of the “Historic Silver Mine, Drainage System, and Underground Water Management of Tarnowskie Góry”.

== Literature ==
- Hugo Koch: Memorial on the Centenary of the Royal Lead and Silver Ore Mine Friedrichsgrube near Tarnowitz, Upper Silesia, celebrated on 16 July 1884.
