= Piszczac =

- Town
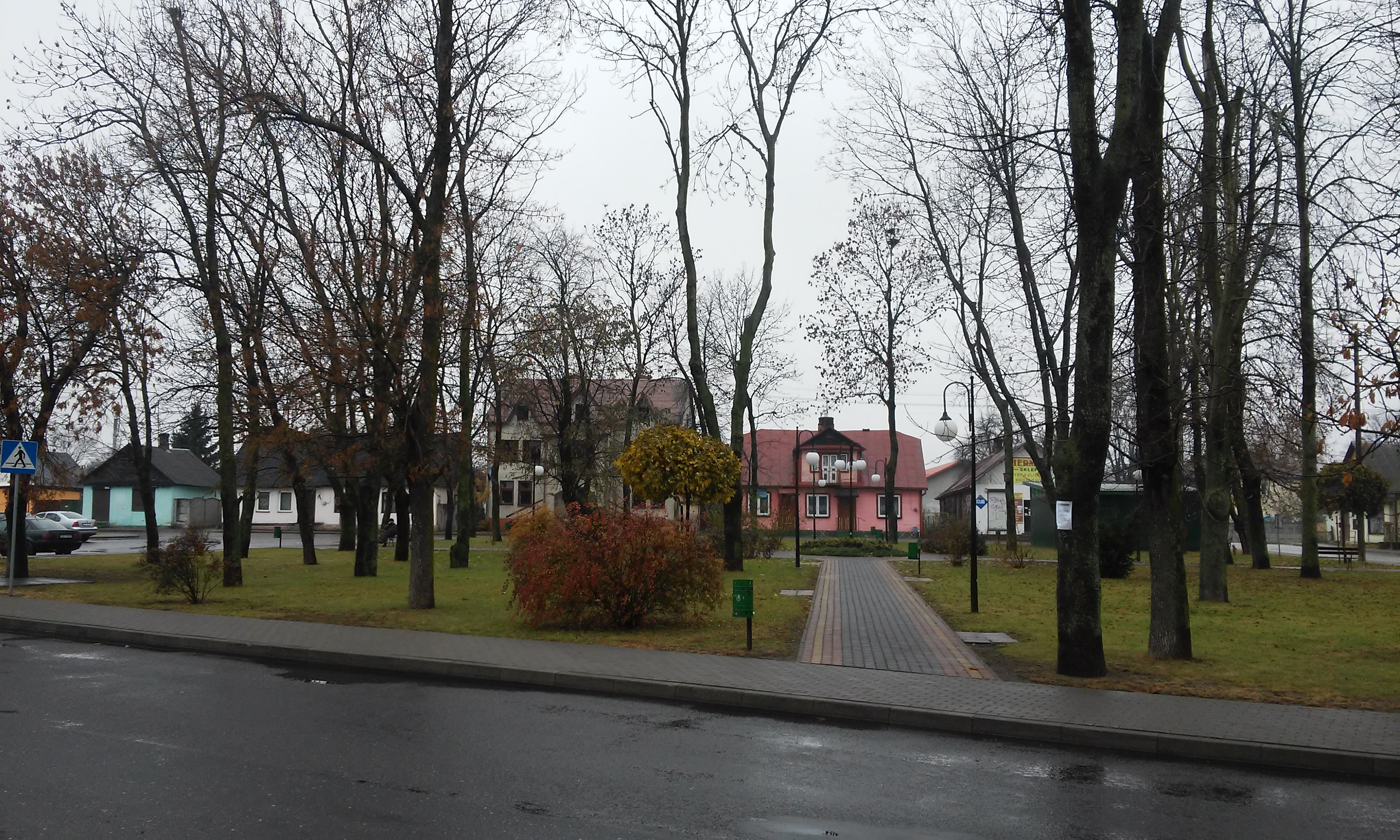

- Coat of arms

- Location within Poland
- Coordinates: 51°58′52″N 23°22′34″E
- Country: Poland
- Voivodeship: Lublin
- County: Biała
- Gmina: Piszczac
- Town rights: 1530

Population
  - Total: 2,087
- Time zone: UTC+1 (CET)
  - Summer (DST): UTC+2 (CEST)
- Vehicle registration: LBI

Piszczac [ˈpʲiʂt͡ʂat͡s] is a town in Biała County, Lublin Voivodeship, in eastern Poland. Today it is the seat of the gmina (administrative district) called Gmina Piszczac.

In 1530–1869, it was a town mentioned in old chronicles and in the census of 1566, as Pieszczatka.
