= Nowy Dwór, Głubczyce County =

Nowy Dwór
- Village
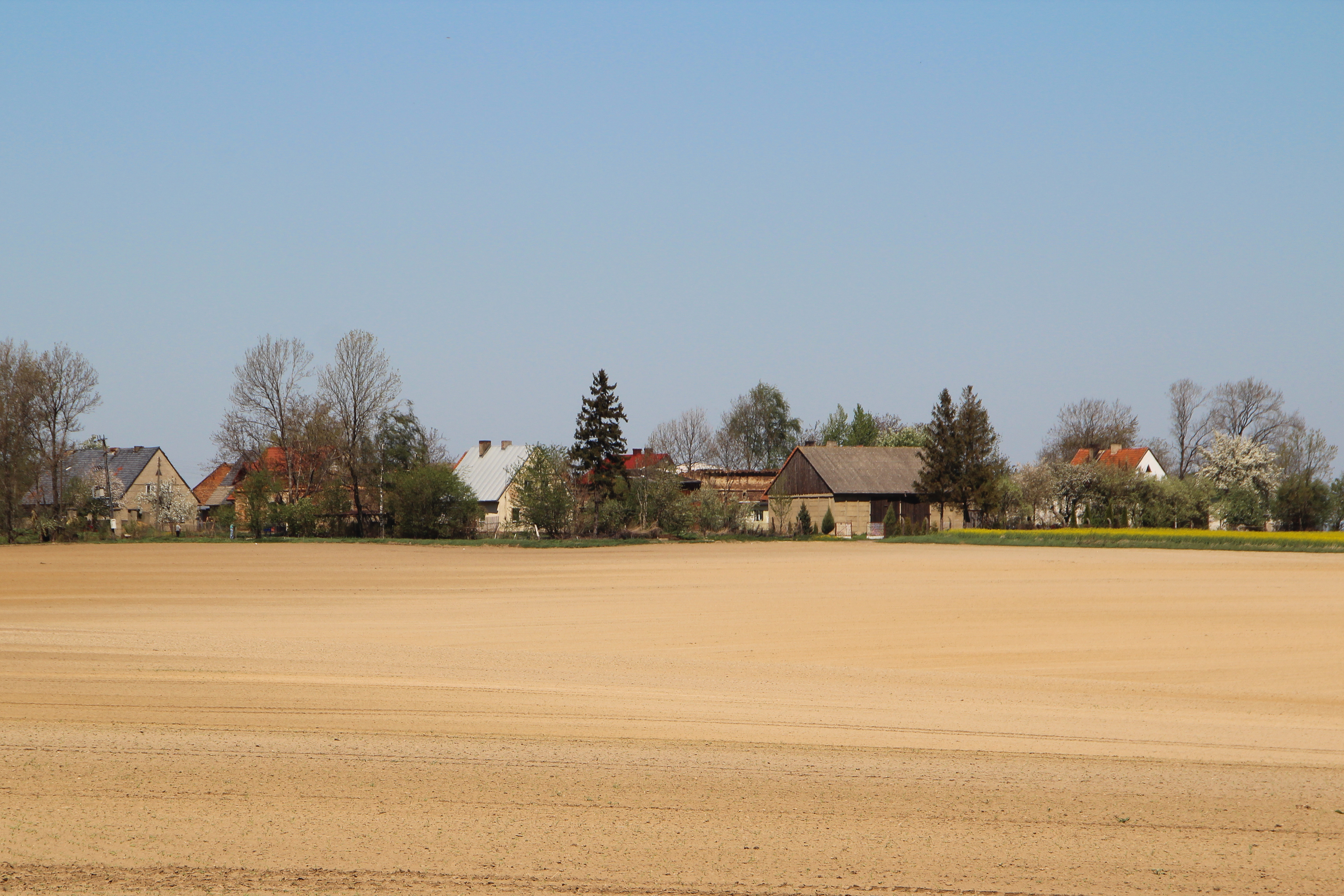

- Location within Poland
- Coordinates: 50°3′24″N 17°52′15″E
- Country: Poland
- Voivodeship: Opole
- County: Głubczyce
- Gmina: Kietrz

Nowy Dwór [ˈnɔvɨ ˈdvur] is a village in the administrative district of Gmina Kietrz, within Głubczyce County, Opole Voivodeship, in south-western Poland, close to the Czech border.
