= Nowy Dwór, Gmina Piszczac =

Nowy Dwór
- Village
- Location within Poland
- Coordinates: 51°59′00″N 23°30′00″E
- Country: Poland
- Voivodeship: Lublin
- County: Biała
- Gmina: Piszczac

Nowy Dwór [ˈnɔvɨ ˈdvur] is a village in the administrative district of Gmina Piszczac, within Biała County, Lublin Voivodeship, in eastern Poland.
