= Niederschlesischer Oberlausitzkreis =

- District
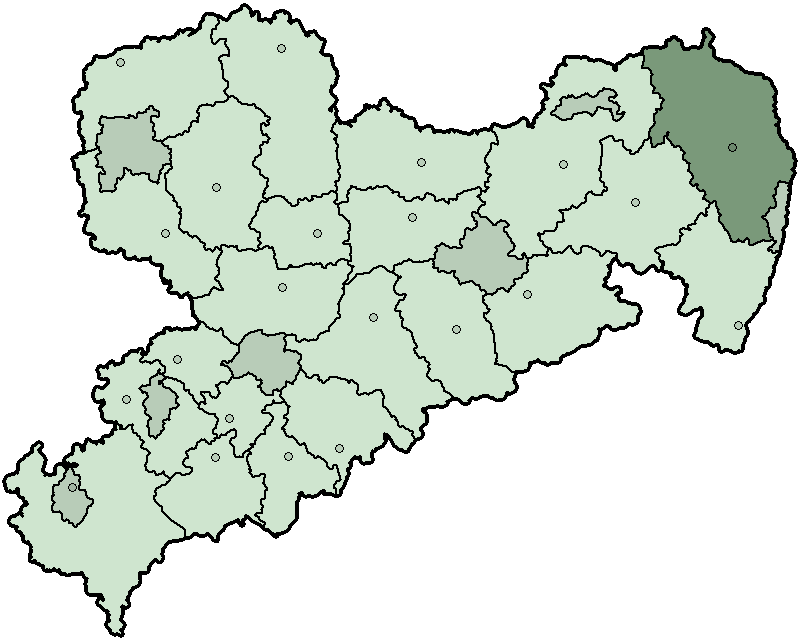
- Country: Germany
- State: Saxony
- Adm. region: Dresden
- Disbanded: 2008-08-01
- Capital: Niesky

Area
  - Total: 1,340.24 km^{2} (517.47 sq mi)

Population (2006)
  - Total: 94,750
  - Density: 71/km^{2} (180/sq mi)
- Time zone: UTC+01:00 (CET)
  - Summer (DST): UTC+02:00 (CEST)
- Vehicle registration: NOL
- Website: www.nol-kreis.de

The Niederschlesischer Oberlausitzkreis (German for Lower Silesian district of Upper Lusatia) was the easternmost Kreis (district) of both Saxony and Germany. Neighboring districts were (from south clockwise) Löbau-Zittau, Bautzen, Kamenz and the district Spree-Neiße in Brandenburg. The urban district Görlitz was in the east, at the border to Poland.

== History ==
The territory of this district was not part of Saxony before World War II; rather, it was a part of German Silesia, along with the city of Görlitz. When most of Silesia was assigned to Poland after the war, the tiny rump of the Silesian province was integrated into Saxony.

The current district was formed in 1994 by merging the previous districts Niesky and Weißwasser, and most part of the former district Görlitz. In August 2008, it became a part of the new district of Görlitz.

== Geography ==
The main river in the district is the Neisse, which also forms the boundary to Poland. The terrain is mostly hilly, with broad valleys. In the past many swamps covered the area, which is now heath areas and many ponds.

== Partnerships ==
- Neustadt an der Waldnaab
- Schwandorf
- Zarski (Poland)
- Semily (Czech Republic)

== Coat of arms ==
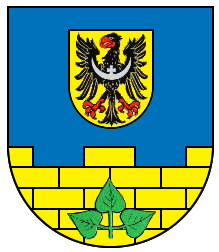
The stone wall in the bottom of the coat of arms is the symbol of the Oberlausitz region, with its three tops symbolizing the three districts which were merged. The linden leaves symbolize the Sorbs Slavic minority. The shield above the wall is the old coat of arms of the Prussian province Lower Silesia (Niederschlesien).

== Towns and municipalities ==
Towns
1. Bad Muskau
2. Niesky
3. Reichenbach/O.L.
4. Rothenburg/O.L.
5. Weißwasser
Municipalities
1. Boxberg
2. Gablenz
3. Groß Düben
4. Hähnichen
5. Hohendubrau
6. Horka
7. Klitten
8. Kodersdorf
9. Königshain
10. Krauschwitz
11. Kreba-Neudorf
12. Markersdorf

13. Mücka
14. Neißeaue
15. Quitzdorf am See
16. Rietschen
17. Schleife
18. Schöpstal
19. Sohland am Rotstein
20. Trebendorf
21. Vierkirchen
22. Waldhufen
23. Weißkeißel
