= Löbau-Zittau =

Coordinates: 50°54′N 14°48′E

- District
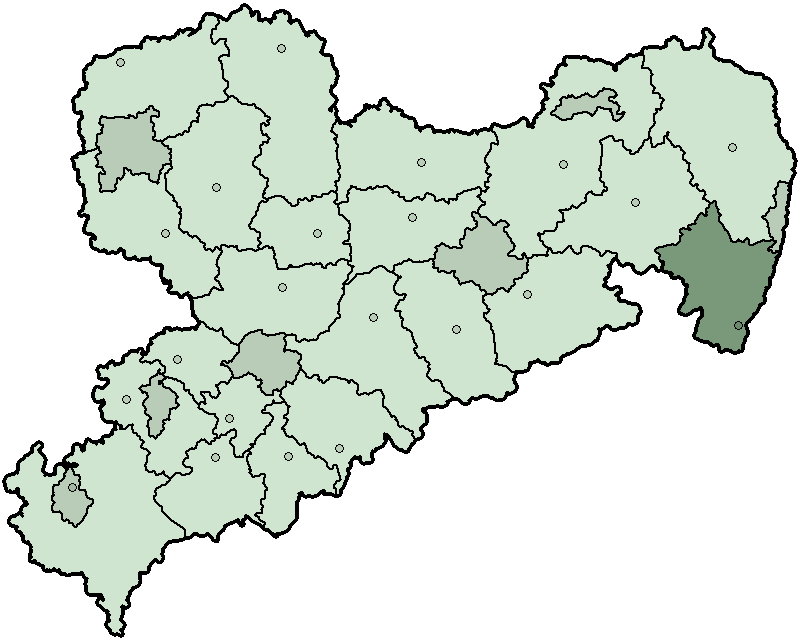
- Country: Germany
- State: Saxony
- Adm. region: Dresden
- Disbanded: 2008-08-01
- Capital: Zittau

Area
  - Total: 698.51 km^{2} (269.70 sq mi)

Population (2001)
  - Total: 152,304
  - Density: 220/km^{2} (560/sq mi)
- Time zone: UTC+01:00 (CET)
  - Summer (DST): UTC+02:00 (CEST)
- Vehicle registration: ZI
- Website: www.lra-loebau-zittau.de

Löbau-Zittau (Sorbian languages: Lubij-Žitawa, pronounced [ˈlubʲij ˈʒitawa]) is a former Kreis (district) in the east of Saxony, Germany. Neighboring districts were the district Bautzen in the north-west and the Niederschlesischer Oberlausitzkreis in the north. To the east was Poland, and to the south the Czech Republic.

== History ==
The district was formed in 1994 by merging two previous districts, Löbau and Zittau. In August 2008, it became a part of the new district of Görlitz.

== Geography ==
The main river in the district is the Lusatian Neisse, which also forms the boundary to Poland. It is mostly hilly landscape of the Lausitzer Bergland; the highest elevation is the Lausche with 793 m above sea level.

== Coat of arms ==
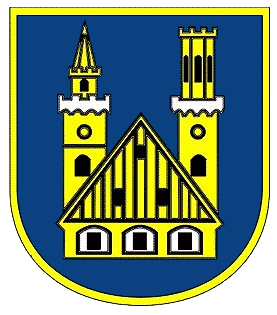
The coat of arms show a typical house of the area, with two towers behind it. The towers represents the town halls of the cities Löbau and Zittau.

== Towns and municipalities ==
Towns
1. Bernstadt auf dem Eigen
2. Ebersbach
3. Herrnhut
4. Löbau
5. Neugersdorf
6. Neusalza-Spremberg
7. Ostritz
8. Seifhennersdorf
9. Zittau
Municipalities
1. Beiersdorf
2. Berthelsdorf
3. Bertsdorf-Hörnitz
4. Dürrhennersdorf
5. Eibau
6. Großhennersdorf
7. Großschönau
8. Großschweidnitz
9. Hainewalde
10. Jonsdorf
11. Lawalde
12. Leutersdorf

13. Mittelherwigsdorf
14. Niedercunnersdorf
15. Obercunnersdorf
16. Oderwitz
17. Olbersdorf
18. Oppach
19. Oybin
20. Rosenbach
21. Schönau-Berzdorf
22. Schönbach
23. Strahwalde
