= Königshain Hills =

Coordinates: 51°11′40″N 14°50′20″E

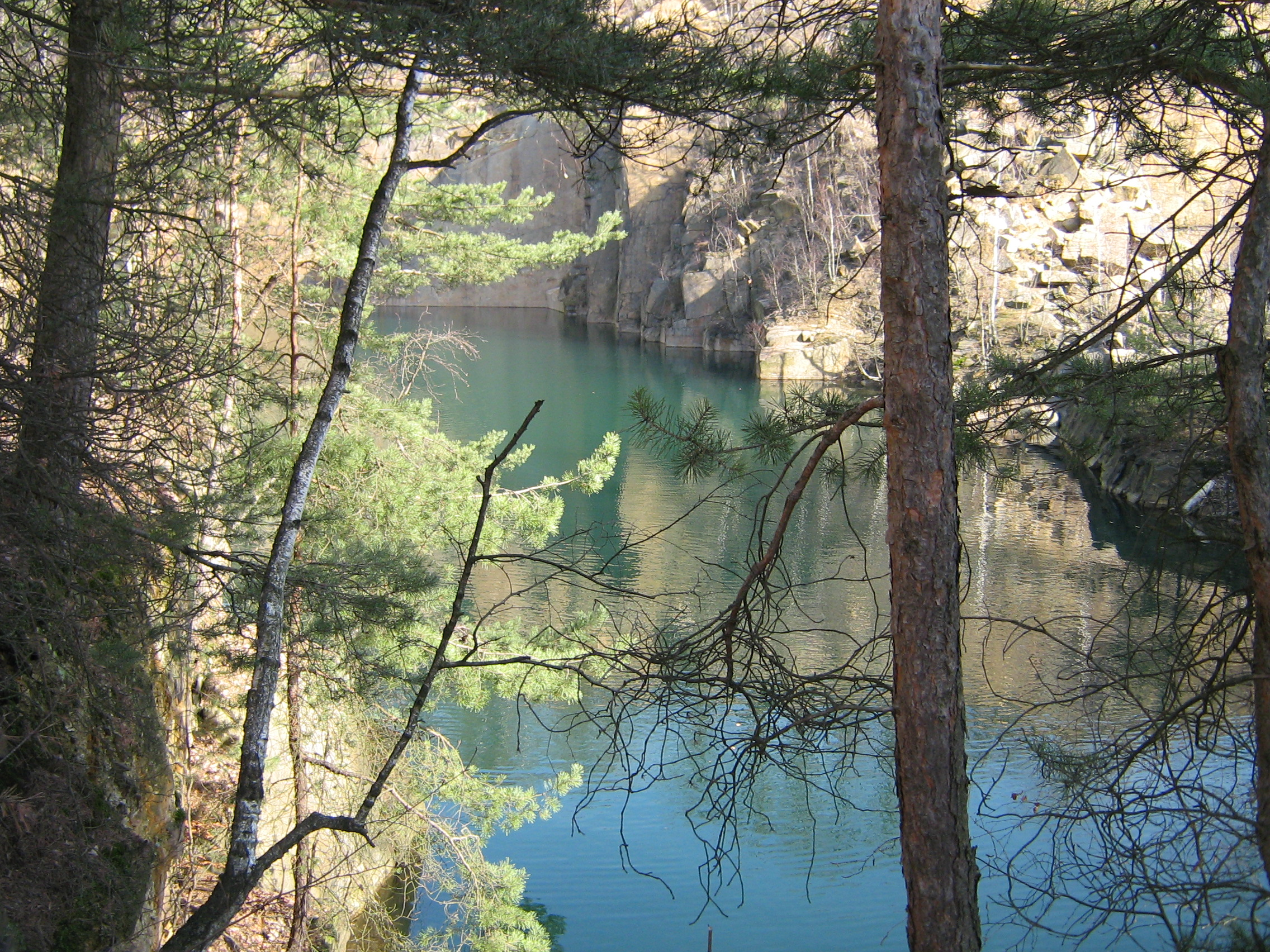
Quarry lake in the Königshain Hills

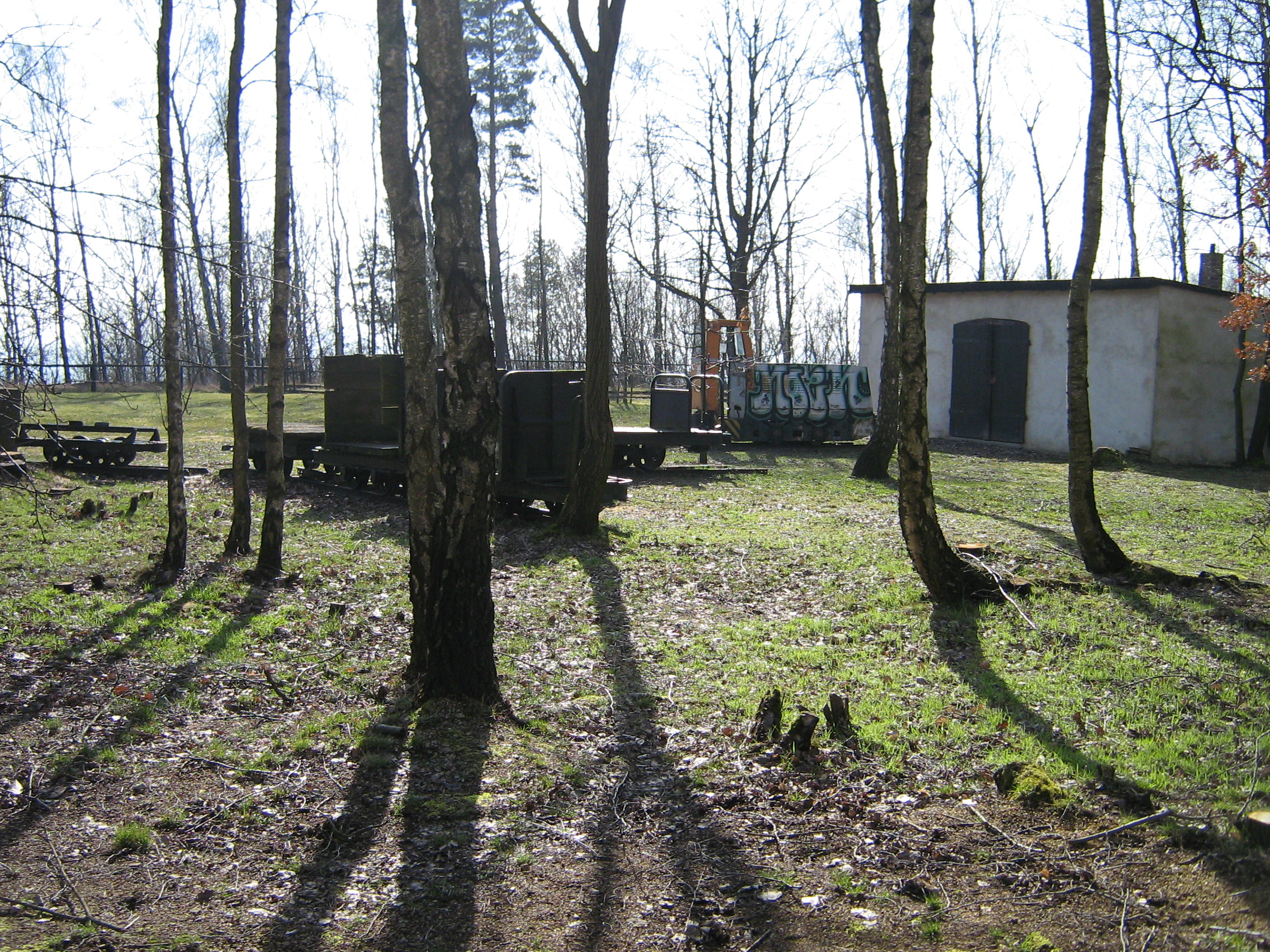
Granite quarrying museum in the Königshain Hills

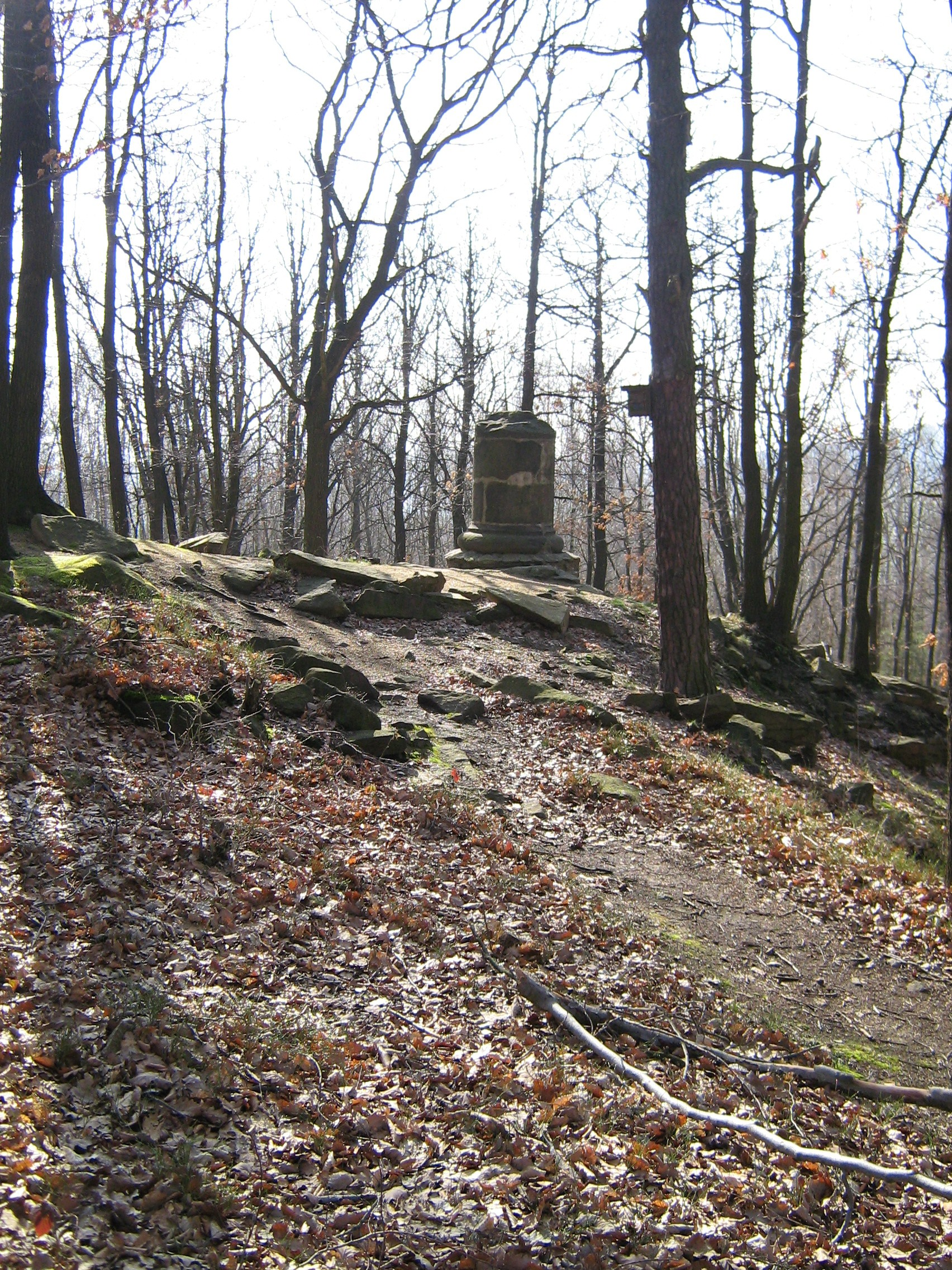
Schachmann column near the Firsten Quarries

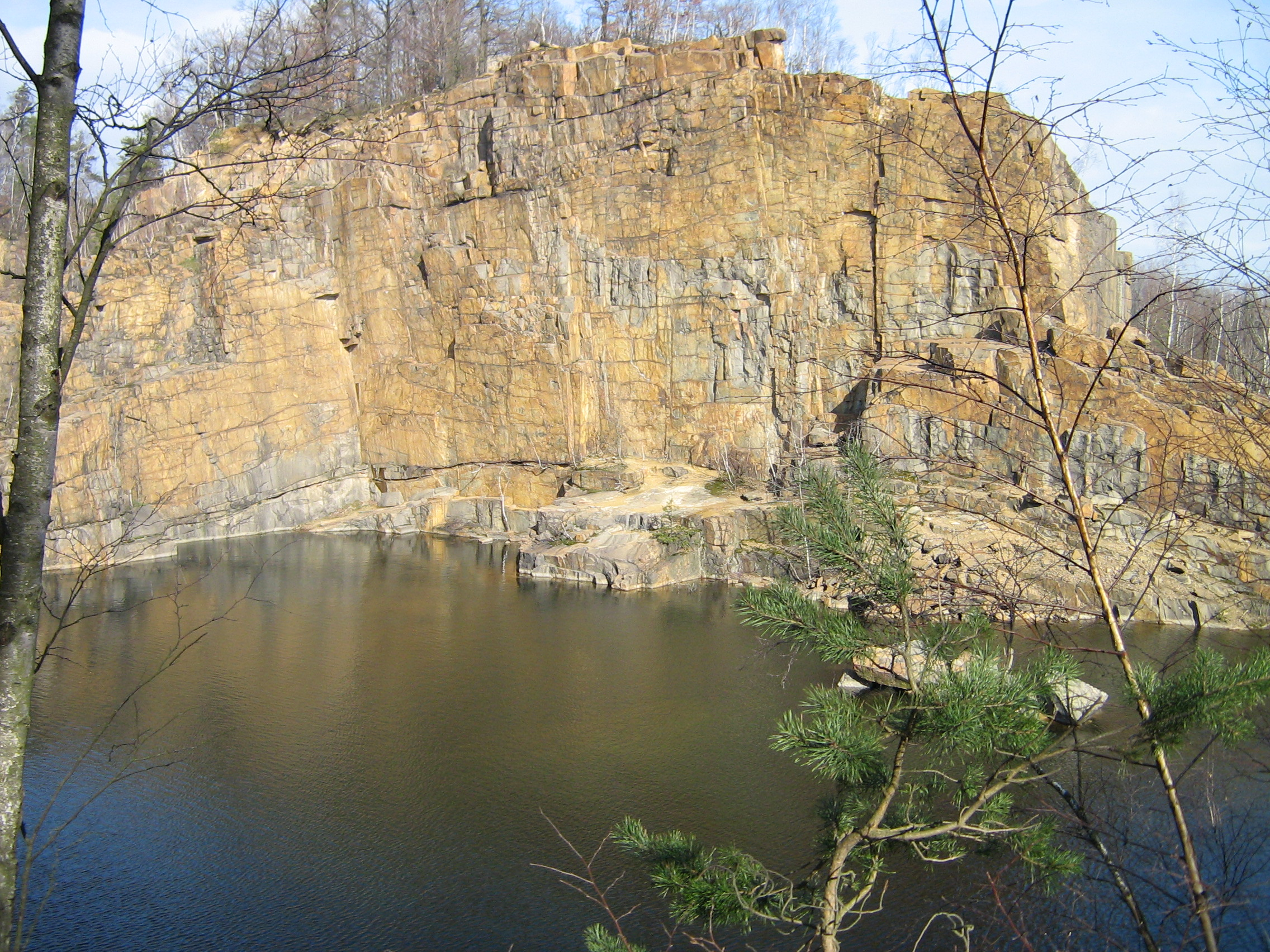
Firsten Quarry in the Königshain Hills

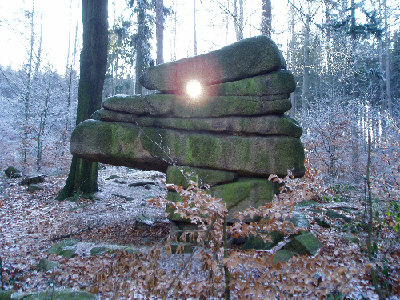
Winter sun in 2007 on the Kuckuckstein

The Königshain Hills (German: Königshainer Berge, Upper Sorbian: Limas) lie in Eastern Upper Lusatia west of the town of Görlitz in the county of the same name. They are located north and south of the village of Königshain after which they are named, and are an extensive, mainly wooded granite region. Their highest points are the Kämpferberge (415m above sea level) and the well-known Hochstein, 406m above sea level. The entire hill range has been a protected area since 1974. In a part (Elysium) of the former Firsten Quarry there is a bird reserve.
