= Görlitz 1/Zhorjelc 1 =

State electoral district of Germany

57: Görlitz 1/Zhorjelc 1
- Electoral district for the Landtag of Saxony
- Görlitz 1/Zhorjelc 1 in 2024
- District: Görlitz
- Electorate: 54,088 (2024)
- Major settlements: Bad Muskau, Niesky, Rothenburg, and Weißwasser

Current electoral district
- Party: AfD
- Member: Roberto Kuhnert

Görlitz 1/Zhorjelc 1 is an electoral constituency (German: Wahlkreis) represented in the Landtag of Saxony. It elects one member via first-past-the-post voting. Under the constituency numbering system, it is designated as constituency 57. It is within the district of Görlitz.

== Geography ==
The constituency comprises the towns of Bad Muskau, Niesky, Rothenburg, and Weißwasser, and the municipalities of Boxberg, Gablenz, Groß Düben, Hähnichen, Hohendubrau, Horka, Kodersdorf, Krauschwitz, Kreba-Neudorf, Mücka, Neißeaue, Quitzdorf am See, Rietschen, Schleife, Schöpstal, Trebendorf, Waldhufen, and Weißkeißel within the district of Görlitz.

There were 54,088 eligible voters in 2024.

== Members ==
Election	Member	Party	%
2014	Lothar Bienst	CDU	41.4
2019	Roberto Kuhnert	AfD	36.6
2024	Roberto Kuhnert	AfD	42.6

== Election results ==
=== 2024 election ===
State election (2024): Görlitz 1/Zhorjelc 1
Notes:	Blue background denotes the winner of the electorate vote. Pink background denotes a candidate elected from their party list. Yellow background denotes an electorate win by a list member, or other incumbent. A ✓ or ✗ denotes status of any incumbent, win or lose respectively.						
Party	Candidate	Votes	%	±%	Party votes	%	±%
AfD	✓ Roberto Kuhnert	16,856	42.6	▲5.9	16,344	41.2	▲5.8
CDU	T. Gottfried Havenstein	13,057	33.0	▼1.3	13,135	33.1	▼3.5
BSW	Hans-Ullrich Hinner	3,372	8.5		4,568	11.5	
Independent	Sylvio Ingo Arndt	2,152	5.4				
Left	Antonia Mertsching	1,373	3.5	▼6.1	916	2.3	▼6.3
FW	Siegmund Hänchen	1,033	2.6	▼2.4	559	1.4	▼1.3
SPD	Maike Gerhild Kreutziger	975	2.5	▼5.6	1,494	3.8	▼2.0
Freie Sachsen					684	1.7	
Greens	Carolin Astrid Renner	436	1.1	▼2.0	592	1.5	▼1.6
APT					387	1.0	
FDP	Claus Torsten Pötschk	357	0.9	▼2.5	236	0.6	▼2.5
PARTEI					218	0.5	▼0.4
Values					128	0.3	
BD					101	0.3	
dieBasis					80	0.2	
Pirates					66	0.2	
Bündnis C					62	0.2	
V-Partei3					35	0.1	
BüSo					31	0.1	
ÖDP					14	0.0	
Informal votes		505			466		
Total valid votes		39,611			39,650		
Turnout		40,116	74.2	▲3.4			
AfD hold	Majority	3,799	9.6				

=== 2019 election ===
State election (2019): Görlitz 1/Zhorjelc 1
Notes:	Blue background denotes the winner of the electorate vote. Pink background denotes a candidate elected from their party list. Yellow background denotes an electorate win by a list member, or other incumbent. A ✓ or ✗ denotes status of any incumbent, win or lose respectively.						
Party	Candidate	Votes	%	±%	Party votes	%	±%
AfD	Roberto Kuhnert	13,987	36.6	▲25.9	13,570	35.4	▲23.7
CDU	Tilman Havenstein	13,083	34.3	▼7.1	14,030	36.6	▼4.5
Left	Antonia Mertsching	3,640	9.5	▼12.6	3,299	8.6	▼10.8
SPD	Thomas Baum	3,063	8.0	▼3.6	2,224	5.8	▼5.2
FW	Siegmund Hänchen	1,900	5.0	▲2.1	1,038	2.7	▲0.4
FDP	Sebastian Grubert	1,300	3.4	▲0.8	1,199	3.1	▼0.4
Greens	Thomas Pilz	1,193	3.1	▲0.4	1,194	3.1	▲0.3
APT					556	1.5	▲0.5
PARTEI					361	0.9	▲0.6
NPD					212	0.6	▼5.0
Verjüngungsforschung					165	0.4	
The Blue Party					130	0.3	
Pirates					67	0.2	▼0.5
Awakening of German Patriots - Central Germany					59	0.2	
ÖDP					56	0.1	
DKP					42	0.1	
BüSo					37	0.1	▼0.1
PDV					23	0.1	
Humanists					19	0.0	
Informal votes		628			511		
Total valid votes		38,166			38,283		
Turnout		38,794	67.9	▲14.8			
AfD gain from CDU	Majority	904	2.3				

=== 2014 election ===
State election (2014): Görlitz 1/Zhorjelc 1
Notes:	Blue background denotes the winner of the electorate vote. Pink background denotes a candidate elected from their party list. Yellow background denotes an electorate win by a list member, or other incumbent. A ✓ or ✗ denotes status of any incumbent, win or lose respectively.						
Party	Candidate	Votes	%	±%	Party votes	%	±%
CDU	Lothar Bienst	11,342	41.4		11,301	41.1	
Left		6,055	22.1		5,337	19.4	
SPD		3,183	11.6		3,040	11.0	
AfD		2,928	10.7		3,208	11.7	
NPD		1,418	5.2		1,550	5.6	
FW		783	2.9		630	2.3	
Greens		745	2.7		784	2.8	
FDP		715	2.6		958	3.5	
APT					285	1.0	
Pirates		252	0.9		189	0.7	
PARTEI					96	0.3	
Pro Germany Citizens' Movement					58	0.2	
BüSo					43	0.2	
DSU					35	0.1	
Informal votes		537			444		
Total valid votes		27,421			27,514		
Turnout		27,958	53.1	▲0.3			
CDU win new seat	Majority	5,287	19.3				

== See also ==
- Politics of Saxony
- Landtag of Saxony
