= Friedersdorf =

Friedersdorf may refer to:

== People ==
- Conor Friedersdorf, American journalist
- Max Friedersdorf (1929–2020), American federal administrative bureaucrat

== Places ==
=== Germany ===
- Friedersdorf, Saxony, a municipality in the district Löbau-Zittau, Saxony
- Friedersdorf, Saxony-Anhalt, a municipality in the district Anhalt-Bitterfeld, Saxony-Anhalt
- Friedersdorf, Thuringia, a municipality in the district Ilm-Kreis, Thuringia
- Friedersdorf, Dahme-Spreewald, a municipality in the district Dahme-Spreewald, Brandenburg

=== Poland ===
- Biedrzychowice, Opole Voivodeship, a village in south-western Poland, German name Friedersdorf

== See also ==
- Fredersdorf (disambiguation)
