= Fredersdorf =

Fredersdorf may refer to:

== People ==
- Herbert B. Fredersdorf (1899–1971), German Filmregisseur
- Michael Gabriel Fredersdorf (1708–1758), Kammerdiener of König Friedrich II. of Prussia

== Places ==
- Fredersdorf, part of Gemeinde Fredersdorf-Vogelsdorf in Landkreis Märkisch-Oderland in Brandenburg
- Fredersdorf station, a railway station located in Fredersdorf-Vogelsdorf

== See also ==
- Fredesdorf, a municipality in the district of Segeberg, in Schleswig-Holstein, Germany
- Fredersdorfer Mühlenfließ, a river of Brandenburg and Berlin
- Friedersdorf (disambiguation)
