= Diehsa =

- Verwaltungsverband
- Location of Diehsa within Görlitz district
- Interactive map of Diehsa
- Location within Germany Location within Saxony
- Coordinates: 51°13′N 14°47′E
- Country: Germany
- State: Saxony
- District: Görlitz
- Seat: Waldhufen
- Subdivisions: 4 municipalities

Area
  - Total: 154.99 km^{2} (59.84 sq mi)

Population (2025-12-31)
  - Total: 6,282
  - Density: 40.53/km^{2} (105.0/sq mi)
- Time zone: UTC+01:00 (CET)
  - Summer (DST): UTC+02:00 (CEST)
- Website: www.verwaltungsverband-diehsa.de

Diehsa is a Verwaltungsverband in the district of Görlitz in Saxony, Germany. The seat of the Verwaltungsverband is in Waldhufen. It takes its name from the village Diehsa, part of the municipality Waldhufen.

The Verwaltungsverband Diehsa consists of the following municipalities:

- Hohendubrau
- Mücka
- Quitzdorf am See
- Waldhufen
