= Stephan Meyer =

German politician (born 1981)

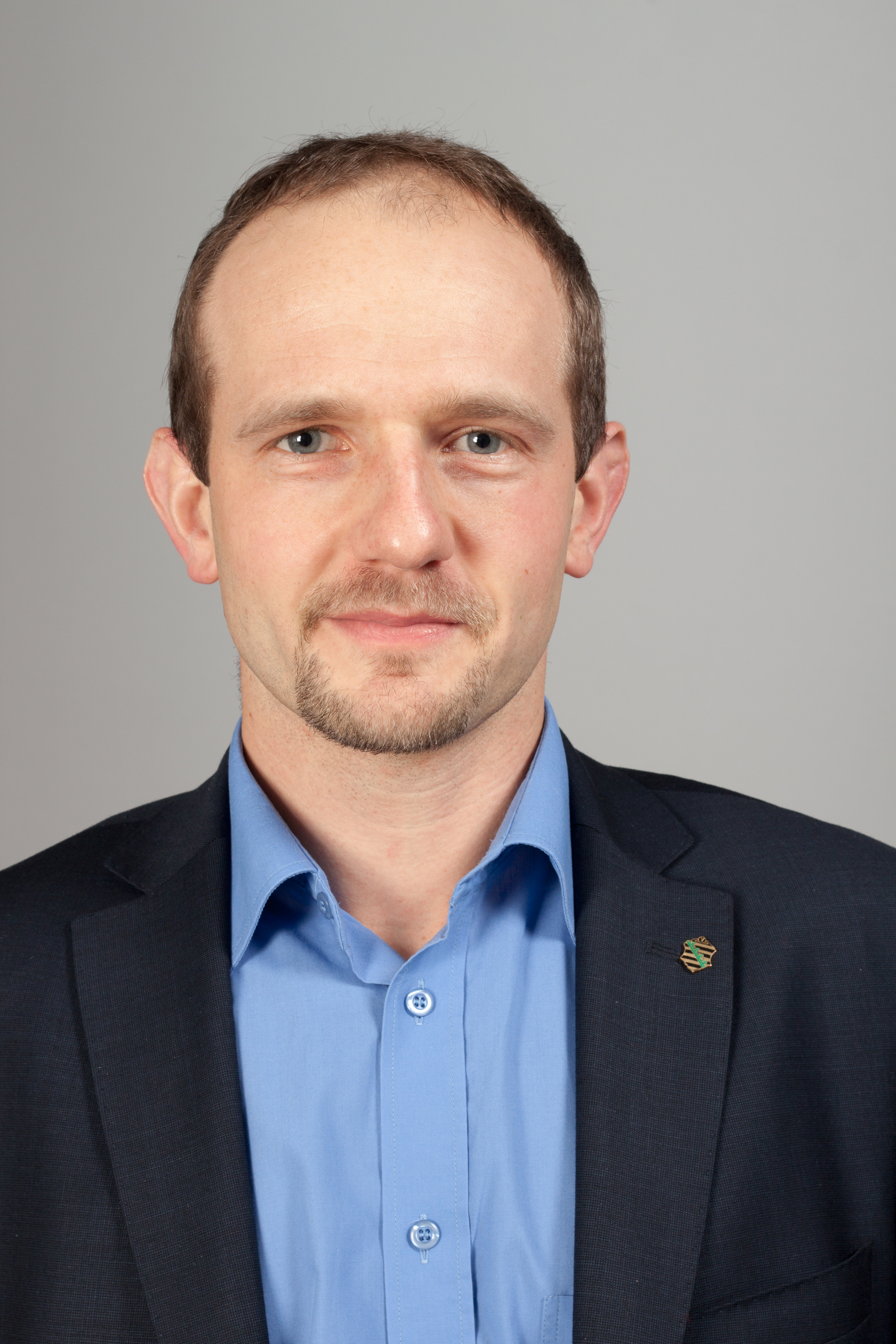
Stephan Meyer 2013

Stephan Meyer (born June 18, 1981; Zittau) is a German politician (CDU). He was directly elected to the state parliament of Saxony to represent the constituency of Loebau-Zittau 2.

== Life ==
Meyer grew up in Eckartsberg. In 1999, he received his high school diploma (Abitur) from the Christian-Weise-Gymnasium in Zittau. Between 1999 and 2001 he was trained as reserve officer for logistics in the German Bundeswehr.

After this training, Meyer studied industrial engineering and management at the University of Applied Science Zittau/Goerlitz as well as economics at the Open University Hagen. For his main study period he switched to the International Academy Zittau (IHI Zittau). In 2006, he successfully completed his university degree in industrial engineering and management by writing a degree dissertation on the topic of “Comparing energy efficiency in the processing industry in Germany, Poland and the Czech Republic”. In 2005, Meyer spent time abroad in Helsinki as a stipendiary of the European Leonardo da Vinci Mobility Programme. Since 2006 he is a stipendiary of the federal state of Saxony and is working on a PhD Thesis regarding the question of the increase in energy efficiency in the Eastern European industry.

In 2007 he gained the qualification of European EnergyMaster through the IHK Bildungszentrum GmbH. Until 2005, Meyer worked for SEC Energie-Contracting as an assistant in the realm of cooperation with Polish partner enterprises. During November 2007 Stephan Meyer was a guest lecturer at the Kazakh University in Almaty within the framework of a project by the German Academic Exchange Service (DAAD). He worked as a research assistant for a year up until May 2008 in the context of creating a logistical context for the planned Bio-Energy Agency of the administrative district Loebau-Zittau.

Additionally, Meyer worked as a student and research assistant within the project E-Learning at higher education institutes of the IHI Zittau. Until September 2008, Meyer was a project manager for the transnational agency for biomass and renewable energy of the Steinbeis Consultation Forum, 3Laendereck Neisse for Energy, Resource and Cooperation Management. Since September 2008, Stephan Meyer is the personal referent (official advisor) to the district administrator of the administrative district Goerlitz. Meyer is reserve first lieutenant of the German Bundeswehr. He is married and has son.

In 2007, Meyer was nominated to the federal state committee of environment of the CDU Saxony. In addition, he is a member of the environmental protection organisation Mittelherwigsdorf as well as the Higher Education Sports Club Turbine Zittau e.V.

Stephan Meyer is a member of the Society for Energy, Science and Politics (Gesellschaft fuer Energiewissenschaft und Energiepolitik e.V.). He also is a co-founder of the youth political forum Loebau-Zittau.

== Politics ==
In 1998 Meyer joined the CDU’s youth organisation (Junge Union) and, between 2005 and 2007, was a part of the state executive of the Junge Union Saxony and Lower Silesia as observer and chair of the working group ‘Europe’. He has been part of the district executive of the Junge Union since 1999, and has been, among other positions, chair of the district between 2001 and 2006 and, since 2009, observer of the district chapter Goerlitz (following the merging of the chapters Loebau-Zittau, Goerlitz, Niederschlesischer Oberlausitzkreis). He has been a member of the CDU since 1999 and has been press officer since 2006 as well as deputy district chair of the CDU group Goerlitz since 2008. Meyer has been working as research assistant in the federal state government of Saxony for Roland Woeller. He has also worked for the Saxon environmental and agricultural ministry in the framework of a research leave; more specifically he worked within the realm of emission protection regarding specific facilities in the context of the scientific discussion of the European emissions trade.

Meyer has been termed as the political protégé of Heinz Eggert, who represented the constituency for years and reached high scores in elections.

Since September 2008, he has been the personal referent (official advisor) to the district administrator in the administrative district Goerlitz. Meyer was also a direct candidate in constituency 60 during the elections to the Saxon federal government 2009. According to the local press, he displayed an active election campaign, without much opposition by the other direct candidates. He is the spokesperson for environmental policy for his party and his part of the committee for the rural areas, environment and agriculture as well as the committee for science, higher education, culture and media.
