= Friedersdorf, Saxony =

Friedersdorf
- Village of Neusalza-Spremberg
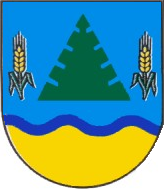
- Coat of arms
- Interactive map of Friedersdorf
- Location within Germany Location within Saxony
- Coordinates: 51°1′31″N 14°33′37″E
- Country: Germany
- State: Saxony
- District: Löbau-Zittau
- Town: Neusalza-Spremberg
- Subdivisions: 2

Area
  - Total: 10.89 km^{2} (4.20 sq mi)
- Elevation: 379 m (1,243 ft)

Population (2006-12-31)
  - Total: 1,433
  - Density: 131.6/km^{2} (340.8/sq mi)
- Time zone: UTC+01:00 (CET)
  - Summer (DST): UTC+02:00 (CEST)
- Postal codes: 02742
- Dialling codes: 035872
- Vehicle registration: ZI
- Website: www.friedersdorf-oberlausitz.de

Friedersdorf (German pronunciation: [ˈfʁiːdɐsˌdɔʁf]) is a former municipality in the district Löbau-Zittau, in Saxony, Germany. Since January 2008, it is part of the town Neusalza-Spremberg.
