= Kuhberg (Dürrhennersdorf) =

Mountain in Germany

Coordinates: 51°03′46″N 14°35′45″E

Highest point
- Elevation: 433.6 m (1,423 ft)

Geography
- Location: Saxony, Germany

Kuhberg is a mountain close to Dürrhennersdorf in Saxony, southeastern Germany. It is part of the Lusetian Mountains.

The Höhenweg trail leads to the summit. Kuhberg is also one of the 350 peaks along the multi-day Internationale Bergwanderweg Eisenach–Budapest.
