= Großschweidnitz =

- Municipality
- Location of Großschweidnitz within Görlitz district
- Interactive map of Großschweidnitz
- Location within Germany Location within Saxony
- Coordinates: 51°4′30″N 14°38′40″E
- Country: Germany
- State: Saxony
- District: Görlitz
- Subdivisions: 2

Government
  - Mayor (2022–29): Jons Anders

Area
  - Total: 7.30 km^{2} (2.82 sq mi)
- Elevation: 304 m (997 ft)

Population (2025-12-31)
  - Total: 1,225
  - Density: 168/km^{2} (435/sq mi)
- Time zone: UTC+01:00 (CET)
  - Summer (DST): UTC+02:00 (CEST)
- Postal codes: 02708
- Dialling codes: 03585
- Vehicle registration: GR, LÖB, NOL, NY, WSW, ZI
- Website: www.grossschweidnitz.de

Großschweidnitz (Upper Sorbian: Swóńca) is a municipality in the district Görlitz, in Saxony, Germany.
