= Dürrhennersdorf =

- Municipality
- Coat of arms

- Location of Dürrhennersdorf within Görlitz district
- Interactive map of Dürrhennersdorf
- Location within Germany Location within Saxony
- Coordinates: 51°3′4″N 14°36′28″E
- Country: Germany
- State: Saxony
- District: Görlitz
- Subdivisions: 2

Government
  - Mayor (2022–29): Daniel Herklotz (Ind.)

Area
  - Total: 10.67 km^{2} (4.12 sq mi)
- Elevation: 396 m (1,299 ft)

Population (2025-12-31)
  - Total: 835
  - Density: 78.3/km^{2} (203/sq mi)
- Time zone: UTC+01:00 (CET)
  - Summer (DST): UTC+02:00 (CEST)
- Postal codes: 02708
- Dialling codes: 035872
- Vehicle registration: GR, LÖB, NOL, NY, WSW, ZI

Dürrhennersdorf (Upper Sorbian: Suche Hendrichecy) is a municipality in the district Görlitz, in Saxony, Germany.

== Landmarks ==
- Kuhberg, a mountain

== Notable people ==
- Wolfgang Böhmer (1936–2025), politician (CDU)
- Willi Hennig (1913–1976) biologist and founder of cladistics
