= Schönau-Berzdorf =

- Municipality
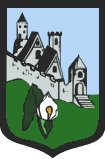
- Coat of arms

- Location of Schönau-Berzdorf within Görlitz district
- Interactive map of Schönau-Berzdorf
- Location within Germany Location within Saxony
- Coordinates: 51°3′47″N 14°53′6″E
- Country: Germany
- State: Saxony
- District: Görlitz

Government
  - Mayor (2022–29): Luisa Wittig

Area
  - Total: 27.84 km^{2} (10.75 sq mi)
- Elevation: 220 m (720 ft)

Population (2025-12-31)
  - Total: 1,397
  - Density: 50.18/km^{2} (130.0/sq mi)
- Time zone: UTC+01:00 (CET)
  - Summer (DST): UTC+02:00 (CEST)
- Postal codes: 02899
- Dialling codes: 035874
- Vehicle registration: GR, LÖB, NOL, NY, WSW, ZI
- Website: schoenau-berzdorf.de

Schönau-Berzdorf (German pronunciation: [ˌʃøːnaʊ ˈbɛʁtsdɔʁf]) is a municipality in the district Görlitz, in Saxony, Germany.
