= Vierkirchen, Saxony =

Vierkirchen
- Municipality
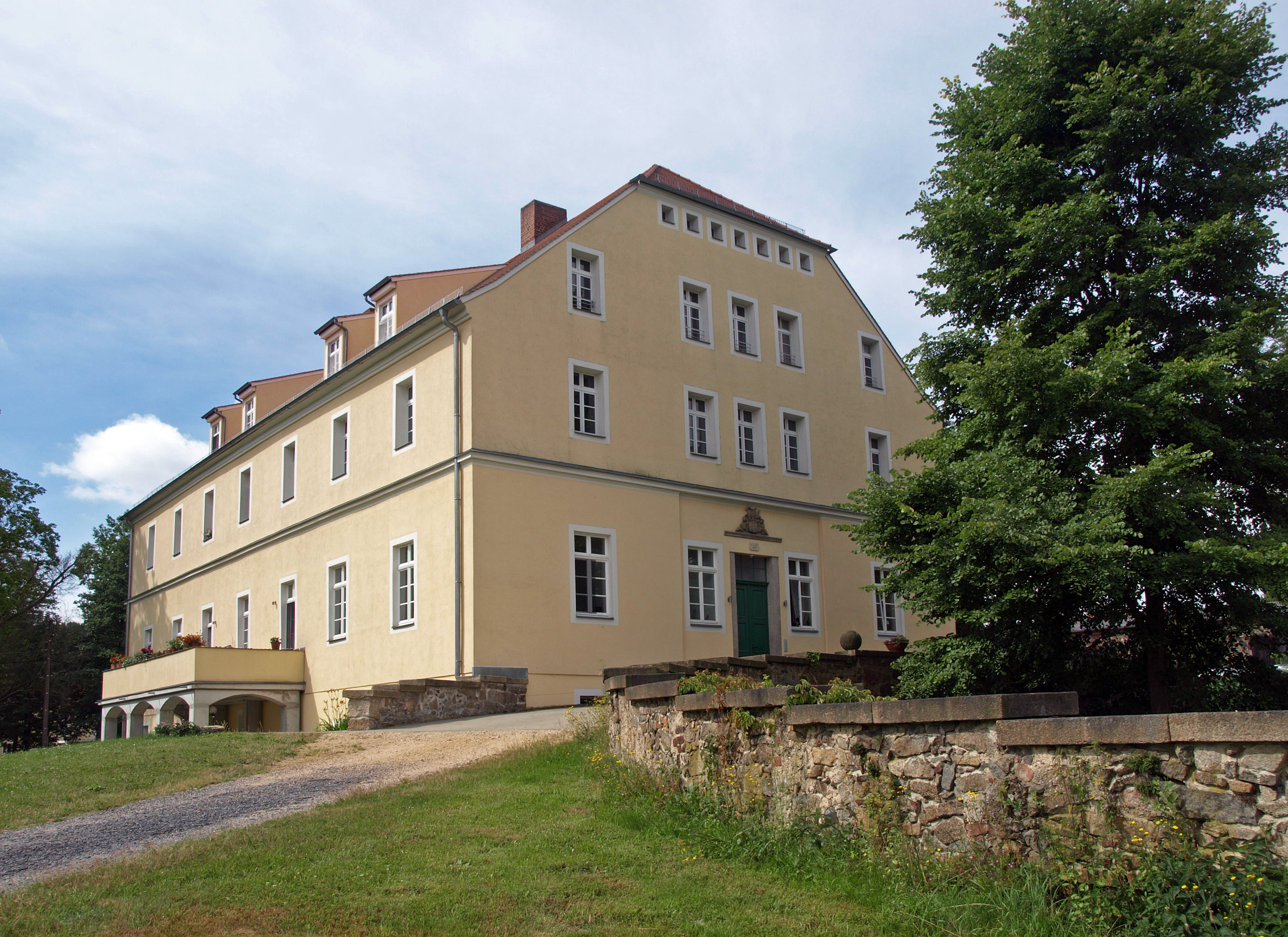
- Manor house in Arnsdorf (Vierkirchen)

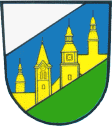
- Coat of arms

- Location of Vierkirchen within Görlitz district
- Interactive map of Vierkirchen
- Location within Germany Location within Saxony
- Coordinates: 51°11′34″N 14°44′51″E
- Country: Germany
- State: Saxony
- District: Görlitz
- Subdivisions: 10

Government
  - Mayor (2023–30): Andrea Weise

Area
  - Total: 35.32 km^{2} (13.64 sq mi)
- Elevation: 250 m (820 ft)

Population (2025-12-31)
  - Total: 1,592
  - Density: 45.07/km^{2} (116.7/sq mi)
- Time zone: UTC+01:00 (CET)
  - Summer (DST): UTC+02:00 (CEST)
- Postal codes: 02894
- Dialling codes: 035827
- Vehicle registration: GR, LÖB, NOL, NY, WSW, ZI
- Website: www.vierkirchen.com

Vierkirchen is a municipality in the district Görlitz, Saxony, Germany.
