= Großschönau, Saxony =

Großschönau
- Municipality
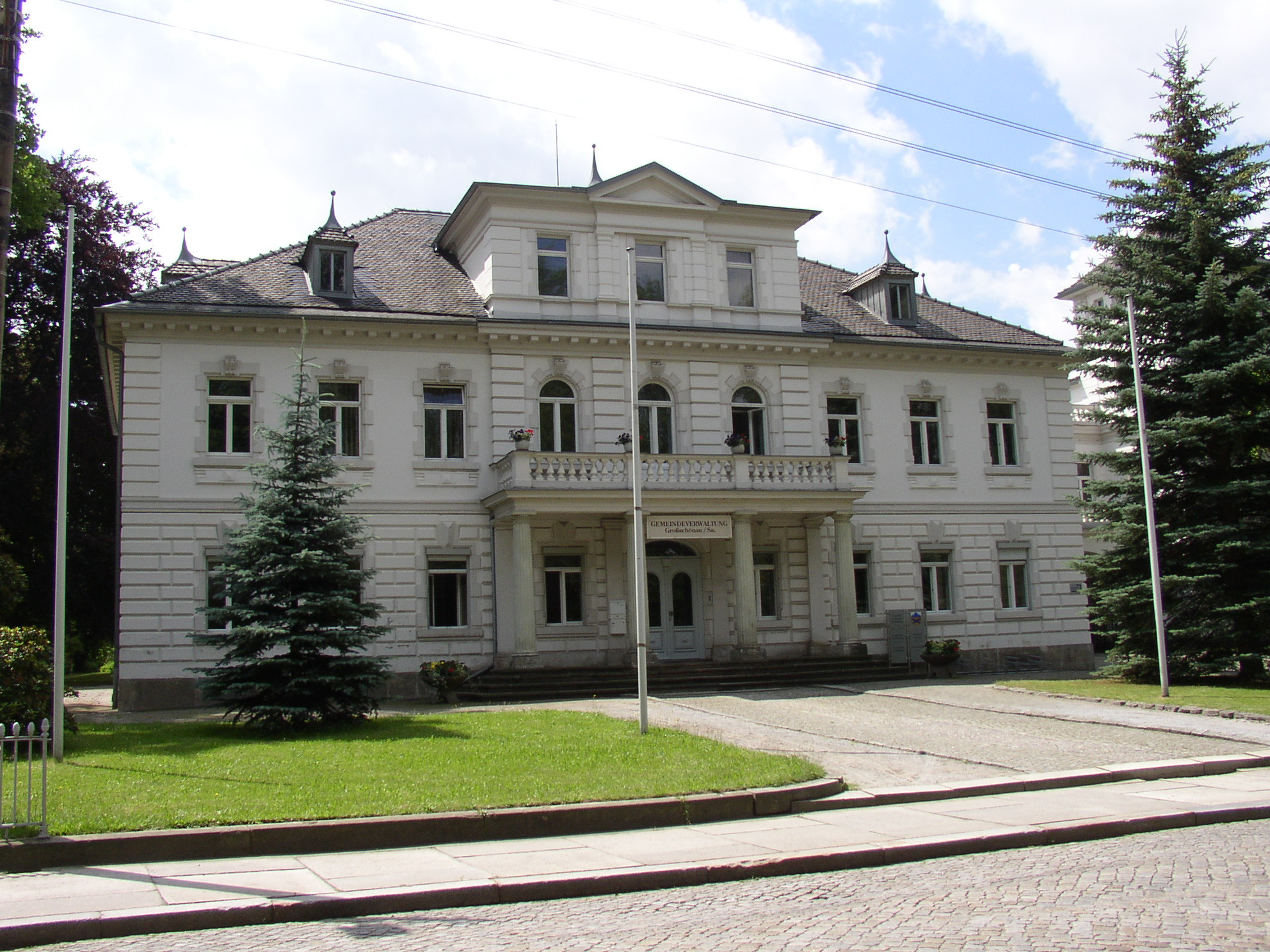
- Municipal office

- Coat of arms

- Location of Großschönau within Görlitz district
- Interactive map of Großschönau
- Location within Germany Location within Saxony
- Coordinates: 50°53′47″N 14°39′44″E
- Country: Germany
- State: Saxony
- District: Görlitz

Government
  - Mayor (2022–29): Frank Peuker

Area
  - Total: 23.87 km^{2} (9.22 sq mi)
- Elevation: 350 m (1,150 ft)

Population (2025-12-31)
  - Total: 5,081
  - Density: 212.9/km^{2} (551.3/sq mi)
- Time zone: UTC+01:00 (CET)
  - Summer (DST): UTC+02:00 (CEST)
- Postal codes: 02779
- Dialling codes: 035841
- Vehicle registration: GR, LÖB, NOL, NY, WSW, ZI
- Website: www.grossschoenau.de

Großschönau (Upper Sorbian: Wulki Šunow, Czech: Velký Šenov) is a municipality in the district Görlitz, in Saxony, Germany located in the cross-border region with the Czech Republic. It used to be a famous Upper Lusatian center of Damask fabric production until the end of the 1980s. Since then it has turned into an area of tourism.

In Großschönau is the historical sylvan lido Trixi Park, a spa which was expanded with indoor swimming pools, a sauna, camping ground and holiday flats. The town is a child-friendly starting point for hikers and cyclists alike who want to explore both sides of the Czech–German border area with its relatively attractive price level. Mount Lausche (793 m) is situated in the community of Waltersdorf and marks the highest peak of the Lusatian Mountains.

== Transport ==
A road connects German Großschönau with its Czech neighboring city of Varnsdorf. The railway station of Grossschönau offers tri-national connections to Poland, the Czech Republic and Germany as the existing track runs through all three countries of the Euroregion. As all countries are members of the Schengen Area, all border checkpoints have been eliminated.

== Residents development ==
Year	Population	
	Neuschönau, Saxony	Großschönau
1871	in 1867 to Grossschönau incorporated	5715
1910	–	7806
1925	–	7348
1939	–	7093
1946	–	8299
1950	–	8471
1964	–	8088
1990	–	6371
2000	–	5707
2007	–	6310
2010	–	6035
2012	–	5804
2013	–	5767
2014	–	5714
2015	–	5589

== Residents of note ==
- Johann Eleazar Zeissig, known as Schenau (1737–1806), German artist
