= Schöpstal =

- Municipality
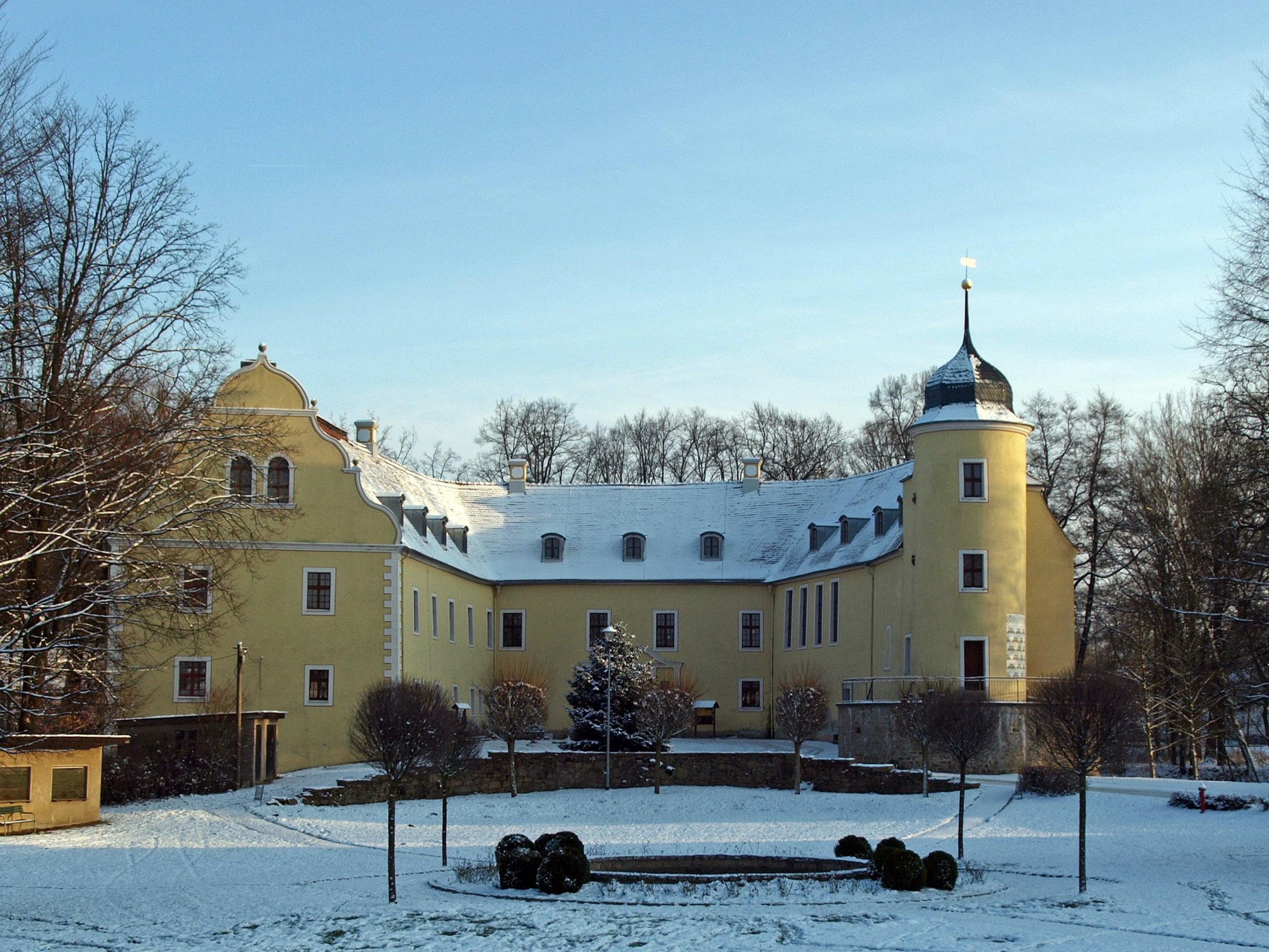
- Ebersbach Castle

- Location of Schöpstal within Görlitz district
- Interactive map of Schöpstal
- Location within Germany Location within Saxony
- Coordinates: 51°11′0″N 14°53′36″E
- Country: Germany
- State: Saxony
- District: Görlitz
- Municipal assoc.: Weißer Schöps/Neiße
- Subdivisions: 4

Government
  - Mayor (2022–29): Bernd Kalkbrenner

Area
  - Total: 29.62 km^{2} (11.44 sq mi)
- Elevation: 231 m (758 ft)

Population (2025-12-31)
  - Total: 2,258
  - Density: 76.23/km^{2} (197.4/sq mi)
- Time zone: UTC+01:00 (CET)
  - Summer (DST): UTC+02:00 (CEST)
- Postal codes: 02829
- Dialling codes: 03581
- Vehicle registration: GR, LÖB, NOL, NY, WSW, ZI
- Website: www.schoepstal.net

Schöpstal (Silesian Dialect "schöps" = sheep and German "tal"= dale, thus "sheepsdale"; Upper Sorbian: Wólčja dolina) is a municipality in the district Görlitz, Saxony, Germany. It consists of the villages of Ebersbach, Girbigsdorf, Kunnersdorf and Liebstein, which are Waldhufendörfer located along the river Weißer Schöps.
