= Kreba-Neudorf =

Kreba-Neudorf Chrjebja-Nowa Wjes
- Municipality
- Location of Kreba-Neudorf within Görlitz district
- Interactive map of Kreba-Neudorf
- Location within Germany Location within Saxony
- Coordinates: 51°20′30″N 14°41′30″E
- Country: Germany
- State: Saxony
- District: Görlitz
- Subdivisions: 4

Government
  - Mayor (2021–28): Dirk Naumburger

Area
  - Total: 31.62 km^{2} (12.21 sq mi)
- Elevation: 143 m (469 ft)

Population (2025-12-31)
  - Total: 809
  - Density: 25.6/km^{2} (66.3/sq mi)
- Time zone: UTC+01:00 (CET)
  - Summer (DST): UTC+02:00 (CEST)
- Postal codes: 02906
- Dialling codes: 035893
- Vehicle registration: GR, LÖB, NOL, NY, WSW, ZI
- Website: www.kreba-neudorf.de

Kreba-Neudorf (German) or Chrjebja-Nowa Wjes (Upper Sorbian) is a municipality in the district Görlitz, Saxony, Germany.

The municipality is part of the recognized Sorbian settlement area in Saxony. Upper Sorbian has an official status next to German, all villages bear names in both languages.

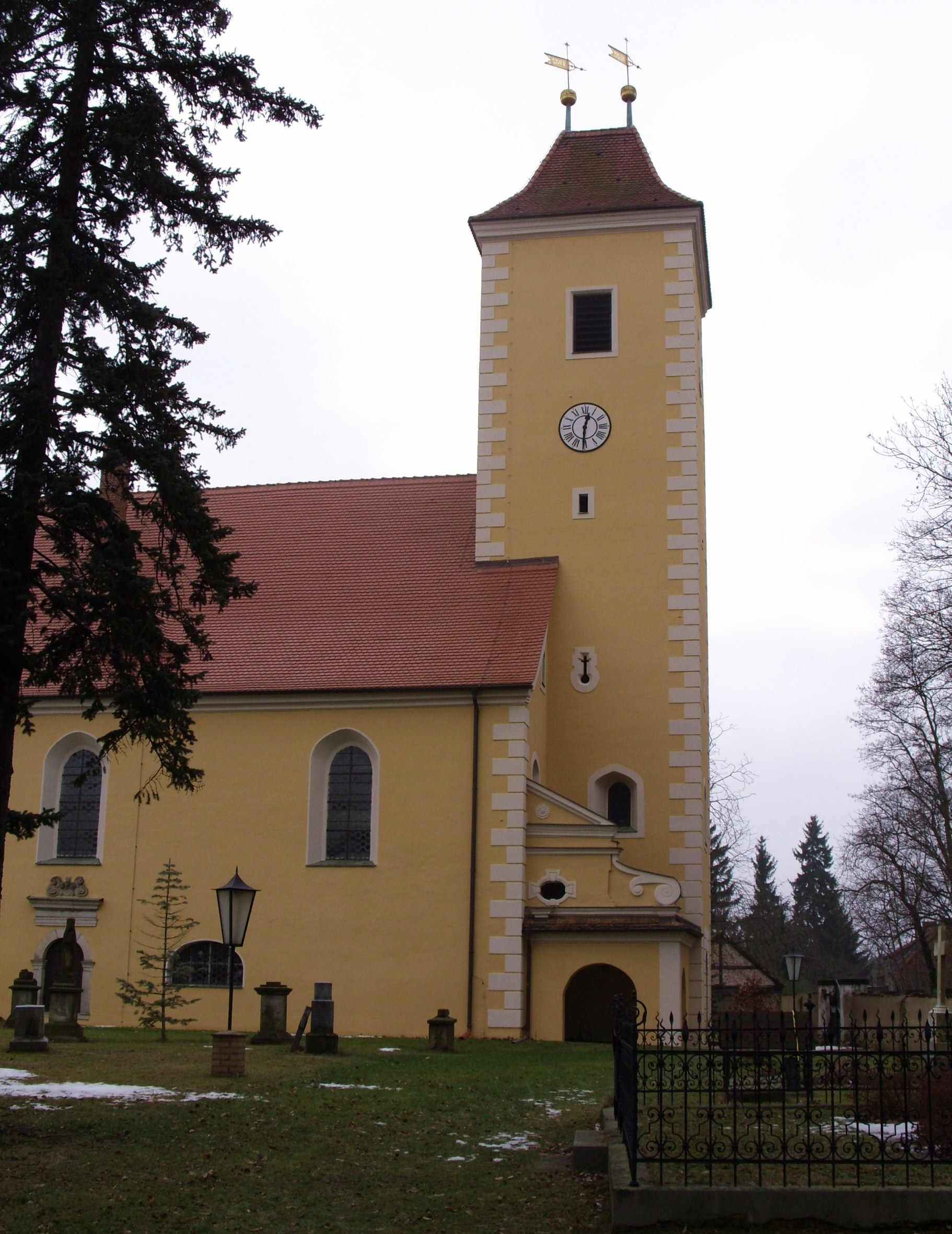
Church in Kreba
