= Schönbach, Saxony =

Schönbach
- Municipality
- Location of Schönbach within Görlitz district
- Interactive map of Schönbach
- Location within Germany Location within Saxony
- Coordinates: 51°4′N 14°34′E
- Country: Germany
- State: Saxony
- District: Görlitz

Government
  - Mayor (2022–29): Uwe Petruttis

Area
  - Total: 9.08 km^{2} (3.51 sq mi)
- Elevation: 380 m (1,250 ft)

Population (2025-12-31)
  - Total: 995
  - Density: 110/km^{2} (284/sq mi)
- Time zone: UTC+01:00 (CET)
  - Summer (DST): UTC+02:00 (CEST)
- Postal codes: 02708
- Dialling codes: 035872
- Vehicle registration: GR, LÖB, NOL, NY, WSW, ZI
- Website: www.gemeinde-schoenbach.de

Schönbach (Upper Sorbian: Šěnawa) is a municipality in the district Görlitz, in Saxony, Germany. It lies very close to the Czech Republic.
