= Lawalde =

- Municipality
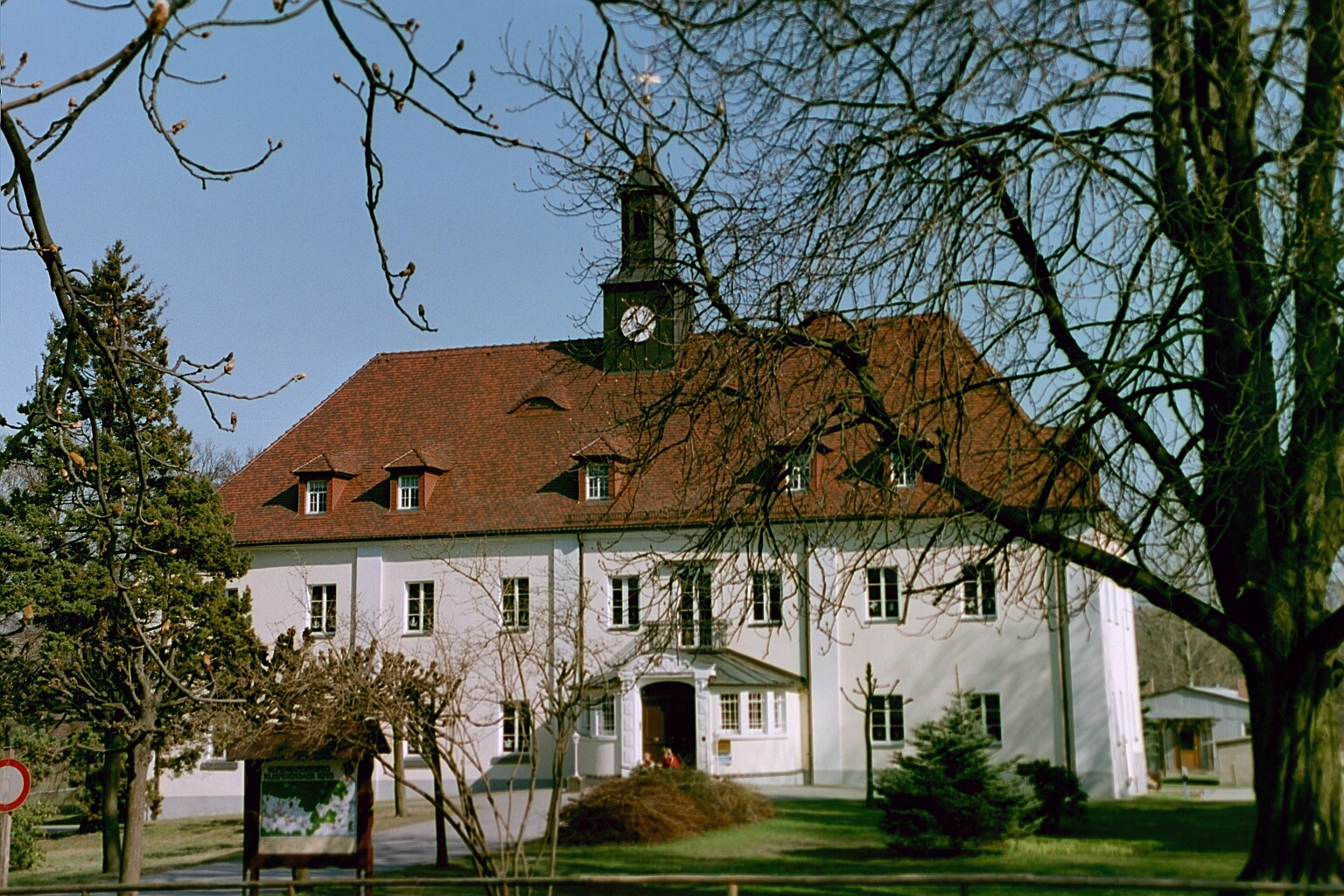

- Location of Lawalde within Görlitz district
- Interactive map of Lawalde
- Location within Germany Location within Saxony
- Coordinates: 51°4′44″N 14°36′5″E
- Country: Germany
- State: Saxony
- District: Görlitz
- Subdivisions: 3

Government
  - Mayor (2022–29): Nadja Kneschke

Area
  - Total: 14.53 km^{2} (5.61 sq mi)
- Elevation: 314 m (1,030 ft)

Population (2025-12-31)
  - Total: 1,732
  - Density: 119.2/km^{2} (308.7/sq mi)
- Time zone: UTC+01:00 (CET)
  - Summer (DST): UTC+02:00 (CEST)
- Postal codes: 02708
- Dialling codes: 03585
- Vehicle registration: GR, LÖB, NOL, NY, WSW, ZI
- Website: www.lawalde.de

Lawalde (Upper Sorbian: Lĕwałd, pronounced [ˈlʲɪwawt]) is a municipality in the district Görlitz, in Saxony, Germany.
