= Hohendubrau =

Hohendubrau/Wysoka Dubrawa
- Municipality
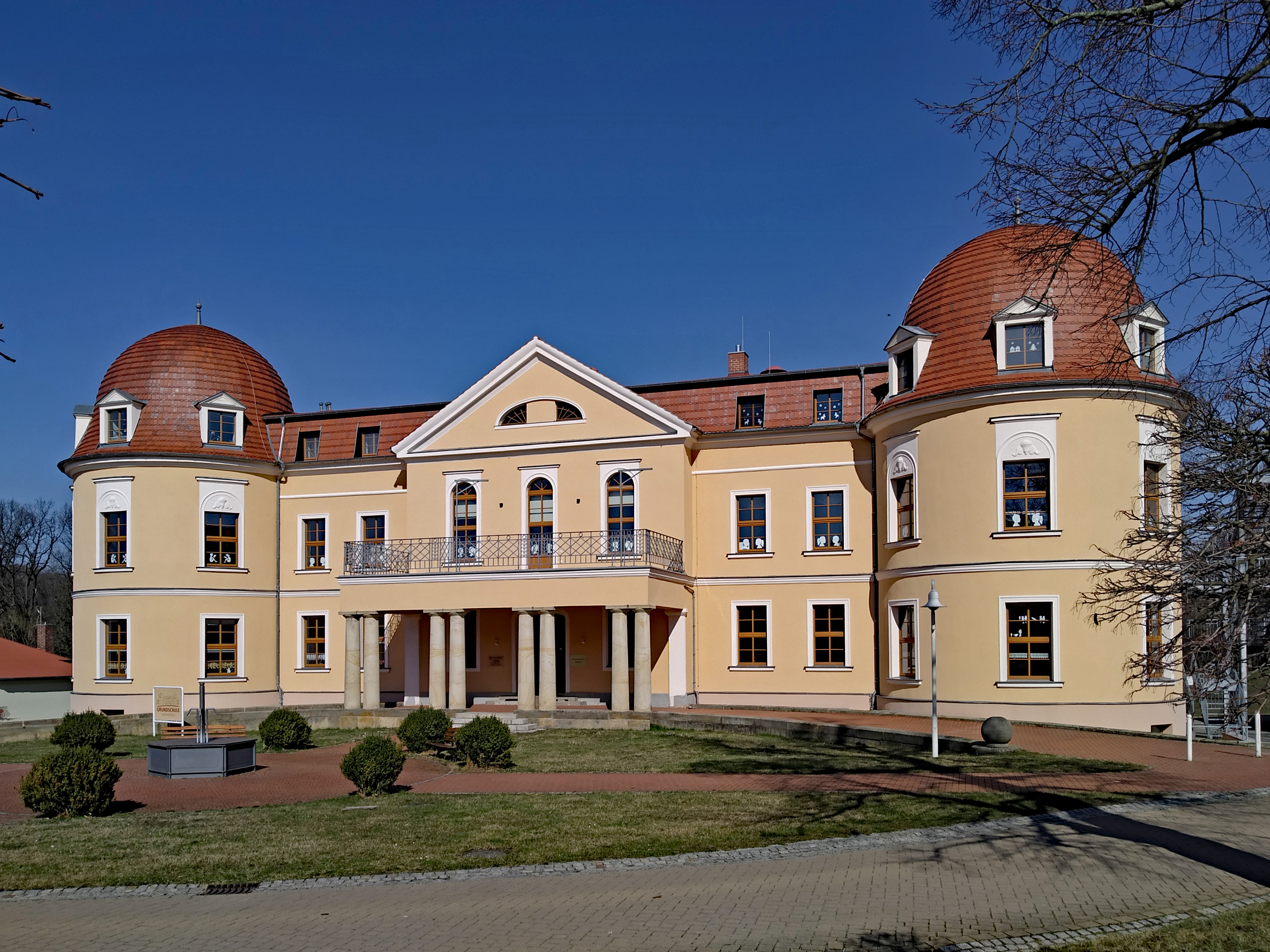
- Elementary school

- Location of Hohendubrau/Wysoka Dubrawa within Görlitz district
- Interactive map of Hohendubrau/Wysoka Dubrawa
- Location within Germany Location within Saxony
- Coordinates: 51°14′40″N 14°40′17″E
- Country: Germany
- State: Saxony
- District: Görlitz
- Municipal assoc.: Diehsa

Government
  - Mayor (2022–29): Henrik Biehle (CDU)

Area
  - Total: 45.42 km^{2} (17.54 sq mi)
- Elevation: 132 m (433 ft)

Population (2025-12-31)
  - Total: 1,829
  - Density: 40.27/km^{2} (104.3/sq mi)
- Time zone: UTC+01:00 (CET)
  - Summer (DST): UTC+02:00 (CEST)
- Postal codes: 02906
- Dialling codes: 035876, 035932
- Vehicle registration: GR, LÖB, NOL, NY, WSW, ZI

Hohendubrau (German) or Wysoka Dubrawa (Upper Sorbian, pronounced [ˈwɨsɔka ˈdubʁawa]) is a municipality in the district of Görlitz in eastern Saxony, Germany.

The larger part of the municipality belongs to the recognized Sorbian settlement area in Saxony. Upper Sorbian has an official status next to German, all villages bear names in both languages.

Hohendubrau takes its German name from the hilly landscape of the Hohe Dubrau.

The following villages are in the municipality. Names are given in German and Upper Sorbian, with populations as of December 2022.

- Dauban/Dubo, 245 inhabitants
- Gebelzig/Hbjelsk, 472 inh.
- Groß Radisch/Radšow, 333 inh.
- Groß Saubernitz/Zubornica, 82 inh.
- Jerchwitz/Jěrchecy, 42 inh.
- Ober Prauske/Hornje Brusy, 179 inh.
- Sandförstgen/Borštka, 46 inh.
- Thräna/Drěnow, 73 inh.
- Weigersdorf/Wukrančicy, 375 inh.
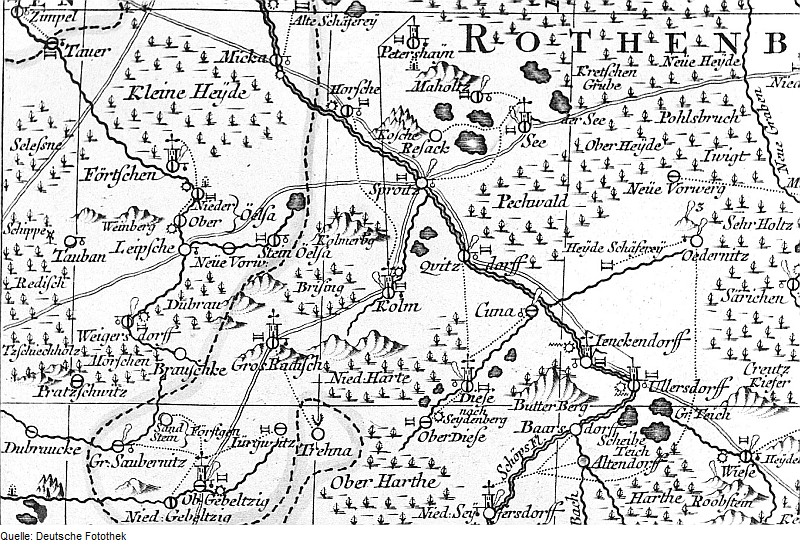
Hohendubrau-Dauban. Oberlausitz map, Schenk, 1759

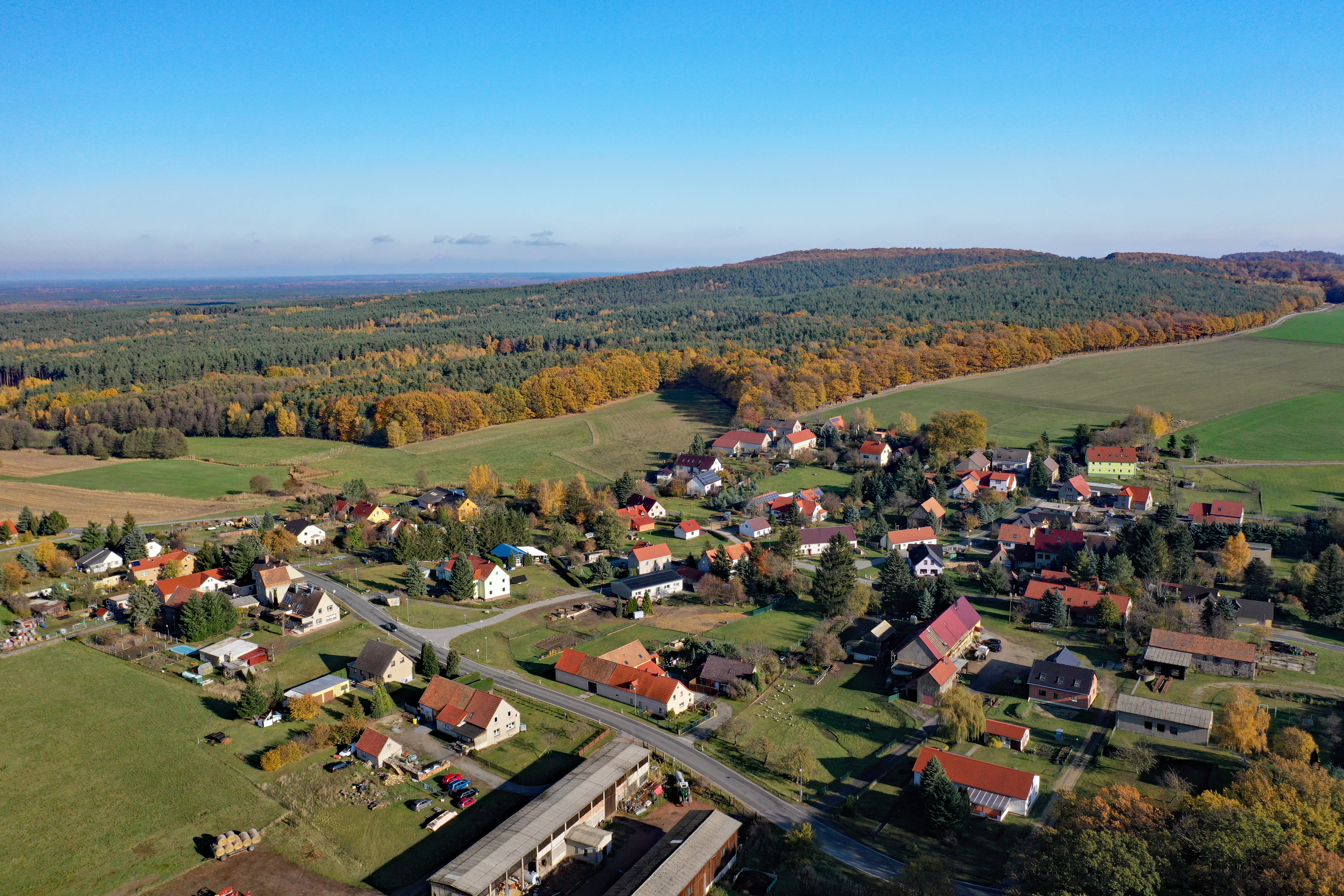
Village Ober Prauske/Hornje Brusy; in background the Hohe Dubrau hills

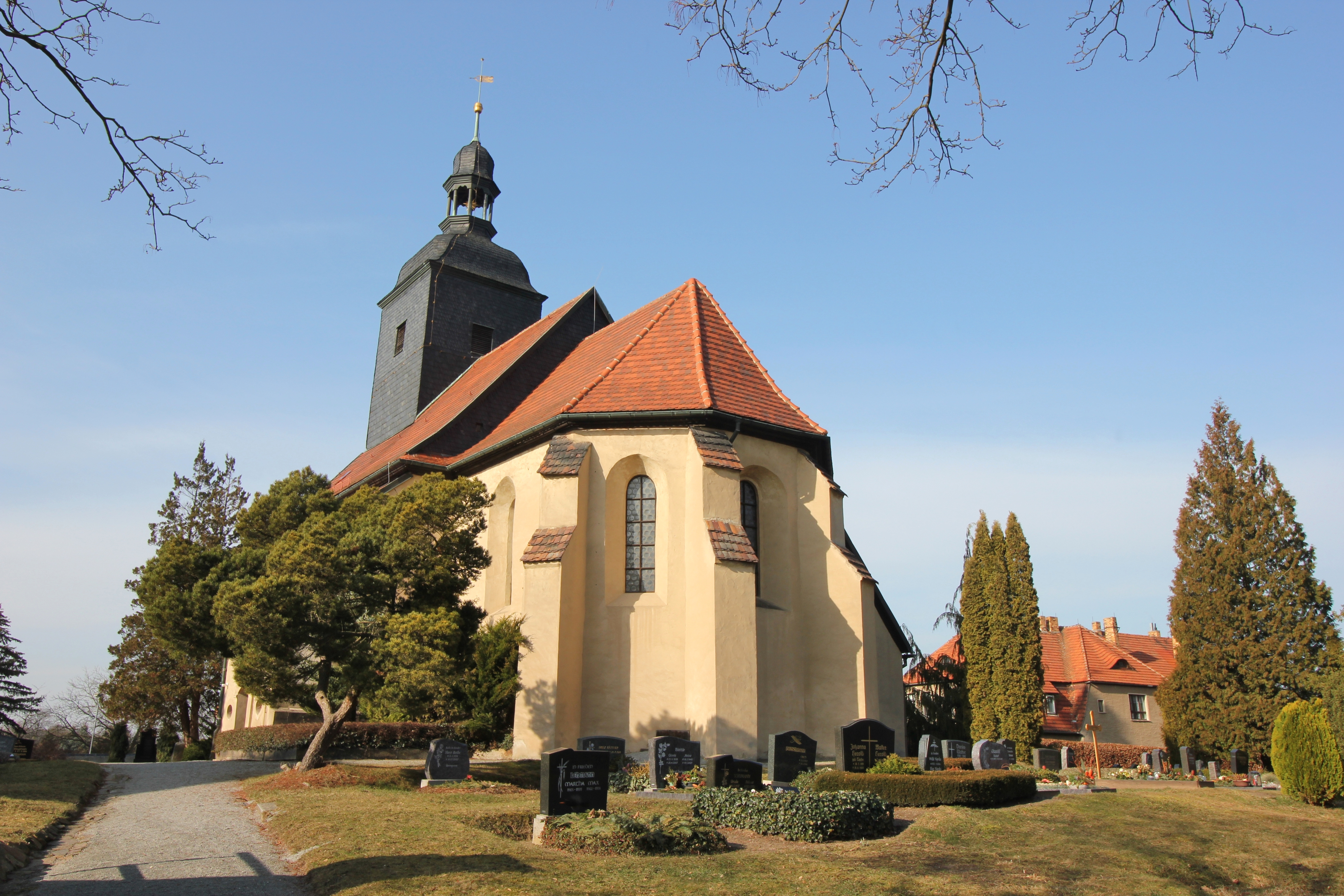
Evangelical church in Gebelzig/Hbjelsk

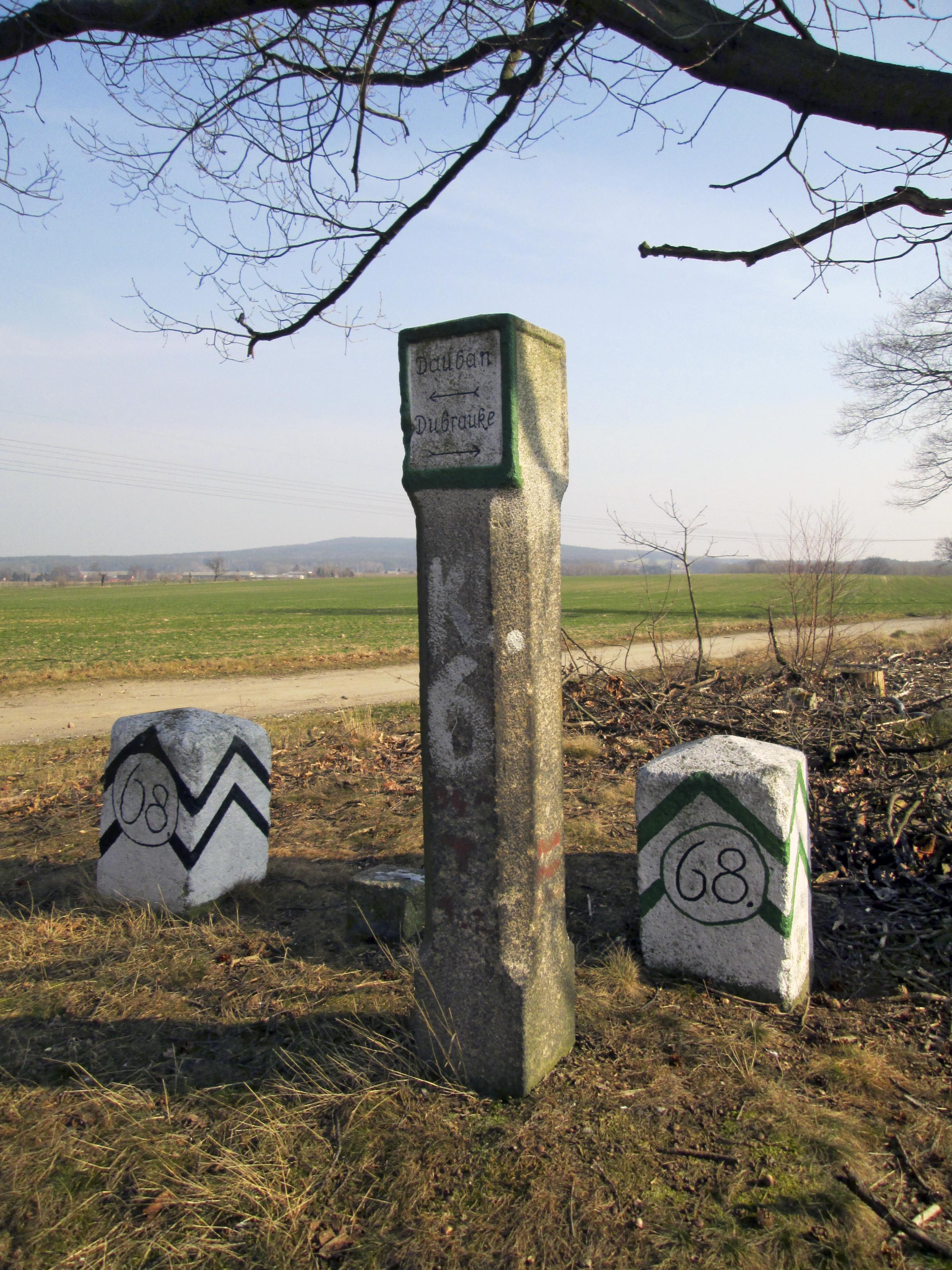
Border-marker stone between Dauban and Dubrauke/Dubrawka

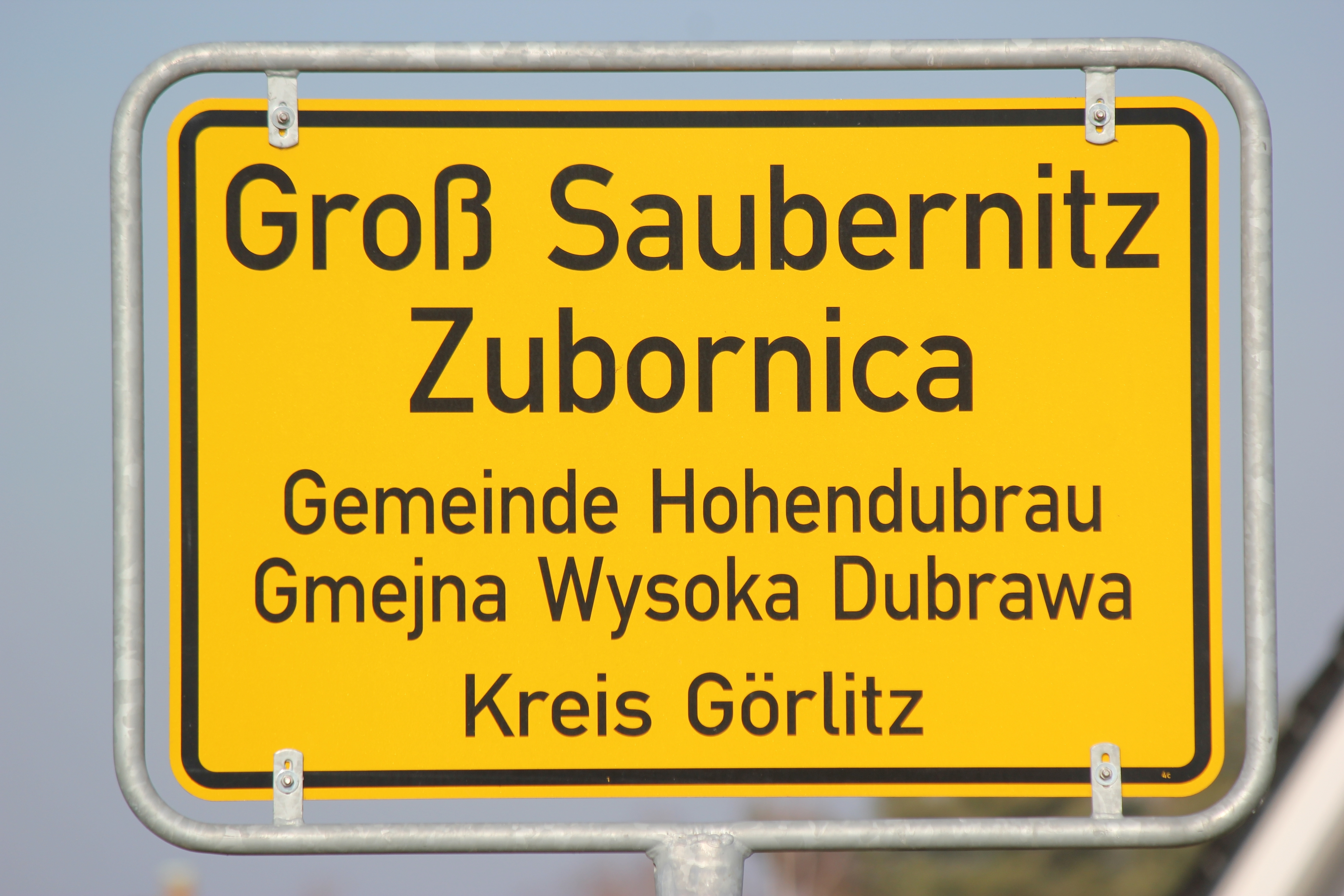
Bilingual sign in German and Upper Sorbian
