= Quitzdorf am See =

- Municipality
- Location of Quitzdorf am See within Görlitz district
- Interactive map of Quitzdorf am See
- Location within Germany Location within Saxony
- Coordinates: 51°17′17″N 14°44′54″E
- Country: Germany
- State: Saxony
- District: Görlitz
- Municipal assoc.: Diehsa
- Subdivisions: 5

Government
  - Mayor (2023–30): Günter Holtschke

Area
  - Total: 36.20 km^{2} (13.98 sq mi)
- Elevation: 154 m (505 ft)

Population (2025-12-31)
  - Total: 1,209
  - Density: 33.40/km^{2} (86.50/sq mi)
- Time zone: UTC+01:00 (CET)
  - Summer (DST): UTC+02:00 (CEST)
- Postal codes: 02906
- Dialling codes: 03588
- Vehicle registration: GR, LÖB, NOL, NY, WSW, ZI
- Website: www.quitzdorf-am-see.de

Quitzdorf am See (Upper Sorbian: Kwětanecy při jězoru) is a municipality in the district Görlitz, Saxony, Germany. It is named after the village Quitzdorf which was abandoned 1969 to make room for a reservoir.
