= Olbersdorf =

- Municipality
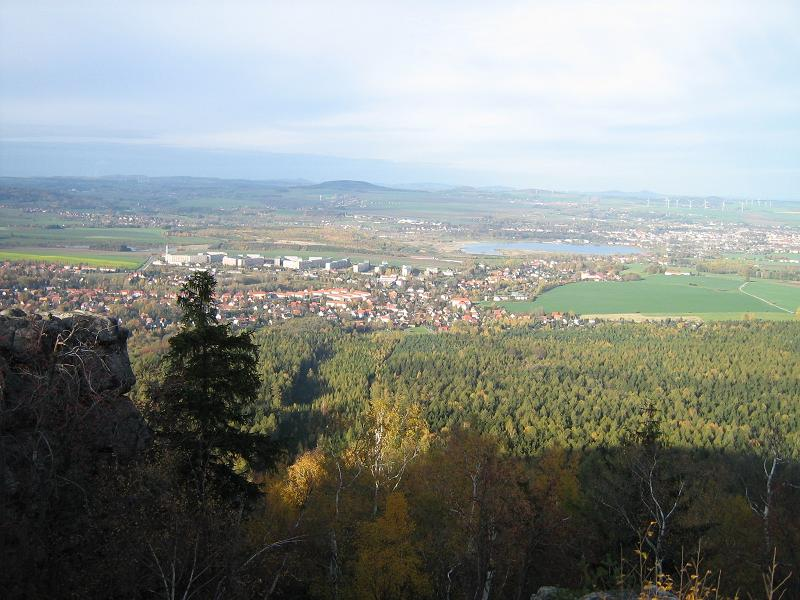
- General view of Olberdorf

- Location of Olbersdorf within Görlitz district
- Interactive map of Olbersdorf
- Location within Germany Location within Saxony
- Coordinates: 50°52′N 14°46′E
- Country: Germany
- State: Saxony
- District: Görlitz
- Subdivisions: 5

Government
  - Mayor (2022–29): Andreas Förster

Area
  - Total: 15.16 km^{2} (5.85 sq mi)
- Elevation: 273 m (896 ft)

Population (2025-12-31)
  - Total: 4,155
  - Density: 274.1/km^{2} (709.9/sq mi)
- Time zone: UTC+01:00 (CET)
  - Summer (DST): UTC+02:00 (CEST)
- Postal codes: 02785
- Dialling codes: 03583
- Vehicle registration: GR, LÖB, NOL, NY, WSW, ZI
- Website: www.olbersdorf.de

Olbersdorf is a municipality in the district Görlitz, in Saxony, Germany.
