= Neusalza-Spremberg =

- Town
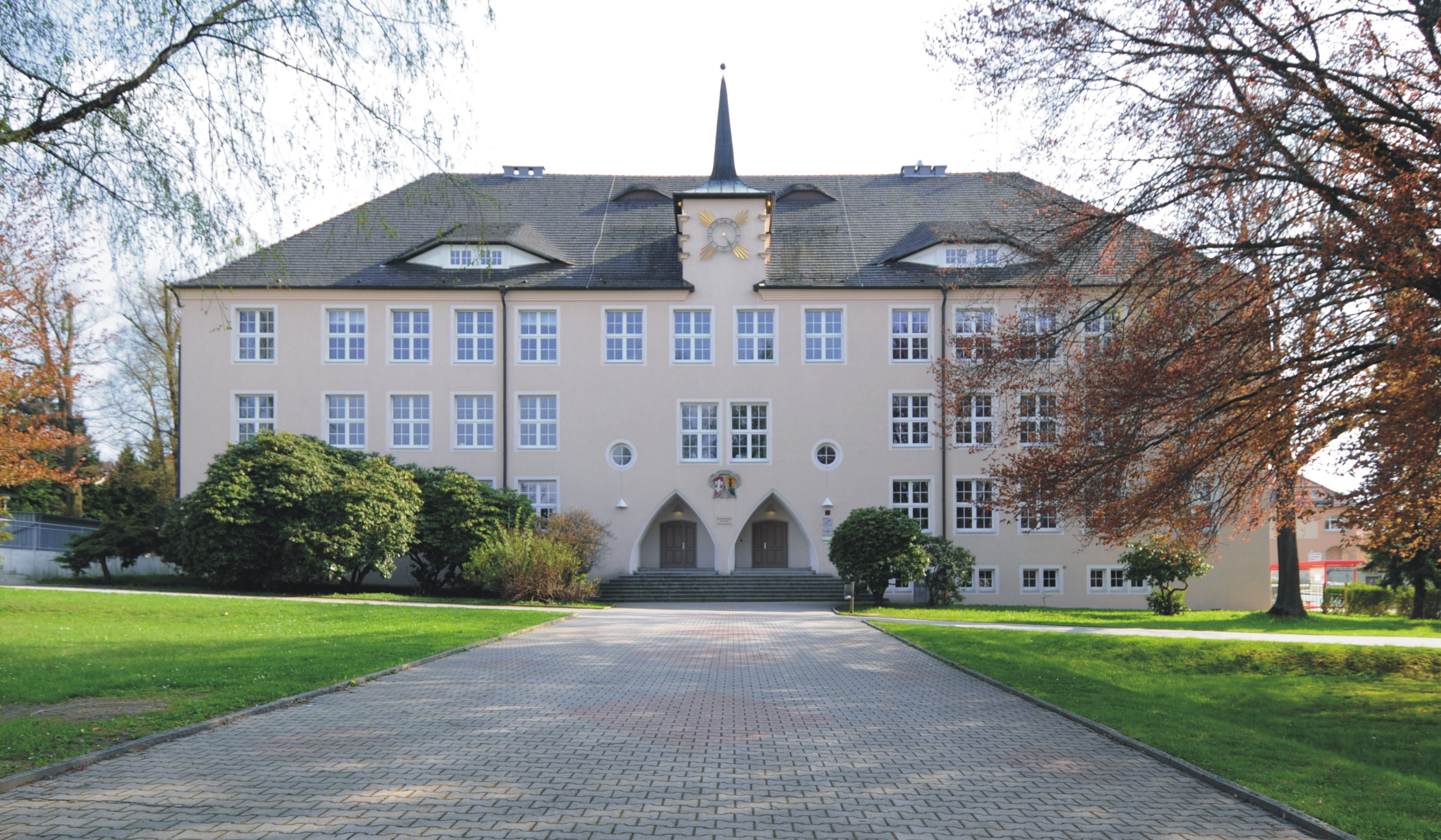
- Pestalozzi School

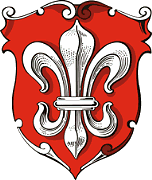
- Coat of arms

- Location of Neusalza-Spremberg within Görlitz district
- Interactive map of Neusalza-Spremberg
- Location within Germany Location within Saxony
- Coordinates: 51°2′20″N 14°31′46″E
- Country: Germany
- State: Saxony
- District: Görlitz
- Subdivisions: 4

Government
  - Mayor (2022–29): Matthias Lehmann

Area
  - Total: 22.91 km^{2} (8.85 sq mi)
- Elevation: 325 m (1,066 ft)

Population (2025-12-31)
  - Total: 3,031
  - Density: 132.3/km^{2} (342.7/sq mi)
- Time zone: UTC+01:00 (CET)
  - Summer (DST): UTC+02:00 (CEST)
- Postal codes: 02742
- Dialling codes: 035872
- Vehicle registration: GR, LÖB, NOL, NY, WSW, ZI
- Website: www.neusalza-spremberg.de

Neusalza-Spremberg (German pronunciation: [nɔʏˈzaltsa ˈʃpʁɛmbɛʁk]; Upper Sorbian: Nowosólc-Grodk) is a town in the district Görlitz, in Saxony, Germany. It is situated on the border with the Czech Republic, on the river Spree, 6 km northwest of Ebersbach, and 17 km southeast of Bautzen.

== Number of inhabitants ==
- 1925: 3,675
- 1939: 3,701
- 1946: 4,436
- 1950: 4,723
- 1964: 4,204
- 1990: 2,862
- 2000: 2,567
- 2005: 2,488
- 2006: 2,442
- 2007: 3,812 (after incorporation of Friedersdorf)
- 2009: 3,691
- 2012: 3,453
- 2013: 3,420
- 2015: 3,356

== Mayor ==
Matthias Lehmann was reelected in June 2022.

== Sons and daughters of the town and its district Friedersdorf ==
- Karl Thieme (1862-1932), theologian, extraordinary professor for Theology at the University of Leipzig
- Paul Reichelt (1898-1981), German General of the Wehrmacht and the Bundeswehr
