= Hähnichen =

- Municipality
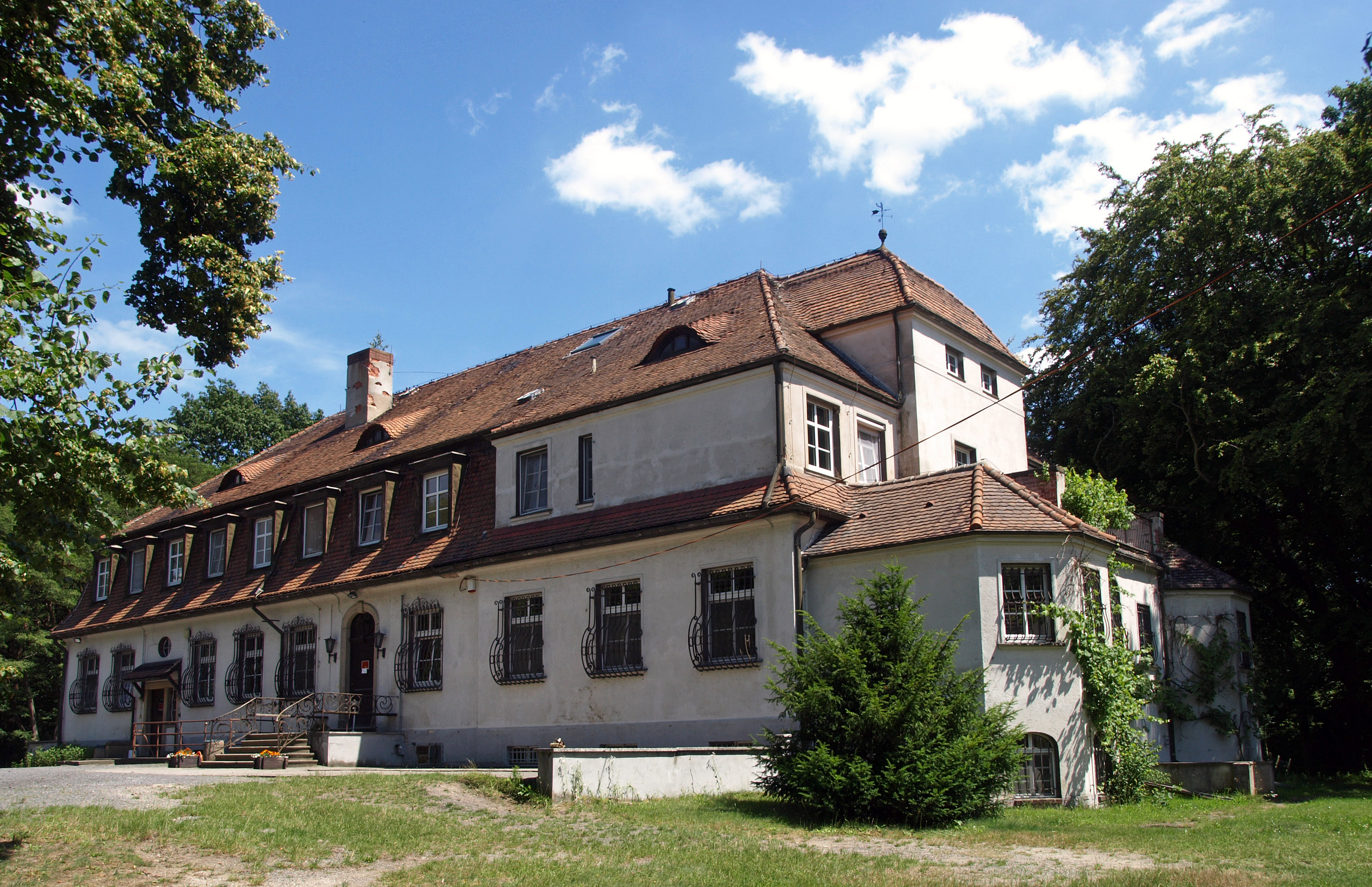
- Niederspree Castle

- Location of Hähnichen within Görlitz district
- Interactive map of Hähnichen
- Location within Germany Location within Saxony
- Coordinates: 51°22′N 14°52′E
- Country: Germany
- State: Saxony
- District: Görlitz
- Subdivisions: 4

Government
  - Mayor (2021–28): Matthias Zscheile

Area
  - Total: 49.60 km^{2} (19.15 sq mi)
- Elevation: 152 m (499 ft)

Population (2025-12-31)
  - Total: 1,147
  - Density: 23.12/km^{2} (59.89/sq mi)
- Time zone: UTC+01:00 (CET)
  - Summer (DST): UTC+02:00 (CEST)
- Postal codes: 02923
- Dialling codes: 035894
- Vehicle registration: GR, LÖB, NOL, NY, WSW, ZI

Hähnichen (Upper Sorbian: Wosečk, pronounced [ˈwɔsɛtʃk]) is a municipality in the district Görlitz, Saxony, Germany. Districts are Quolsdorf, Spree and Trebus. The church of Hähnichen, rebuilt in 1708/09, was first mentioned in 1436.
