= Görlitz (district) =

Coordinates: 51°10′N 14°50′E

Görlitz Wokrjes Zhorjelc
- District
- Flag Coat of arms
- Country: Germany
- State: Saxony
- Capital: Görlitz

Government
  - District admin.: Stephan Meyer (CDU)

Area
  - Total: 2,106 km^{2} (813 sq mi)

Population (31 December 2025)
  - Total: 241,749
  - Density: 114.8/km^{2} (297.3/sq mi)
- Time zone: UTC+01:00 (CET)
  - Summer (DST): UTC+02:00 (CEST)
- Vehicle registration: GR, LÖB, NOL, NY, WSW, ZI
- Website: www.kreis-görlitz.de

Görlitz district (German: Landkreis Görlitz; Upper Sorbian: Wokrjes Zhorjelc [ˈwɔkʁʲɛs ˈzhɔʁʲɛlts]; Czech: Zemský okres Zhořelec; Polish: Powiat Zgorzelec) is a district (Kreis) in Saxony, and the easternmost in Germany. It is named after its capital Görlitz. It borders (from the west and clockwise) the district of Bautzen, the state of Brandenburg, Poland and the Czech Republic.

== History ==
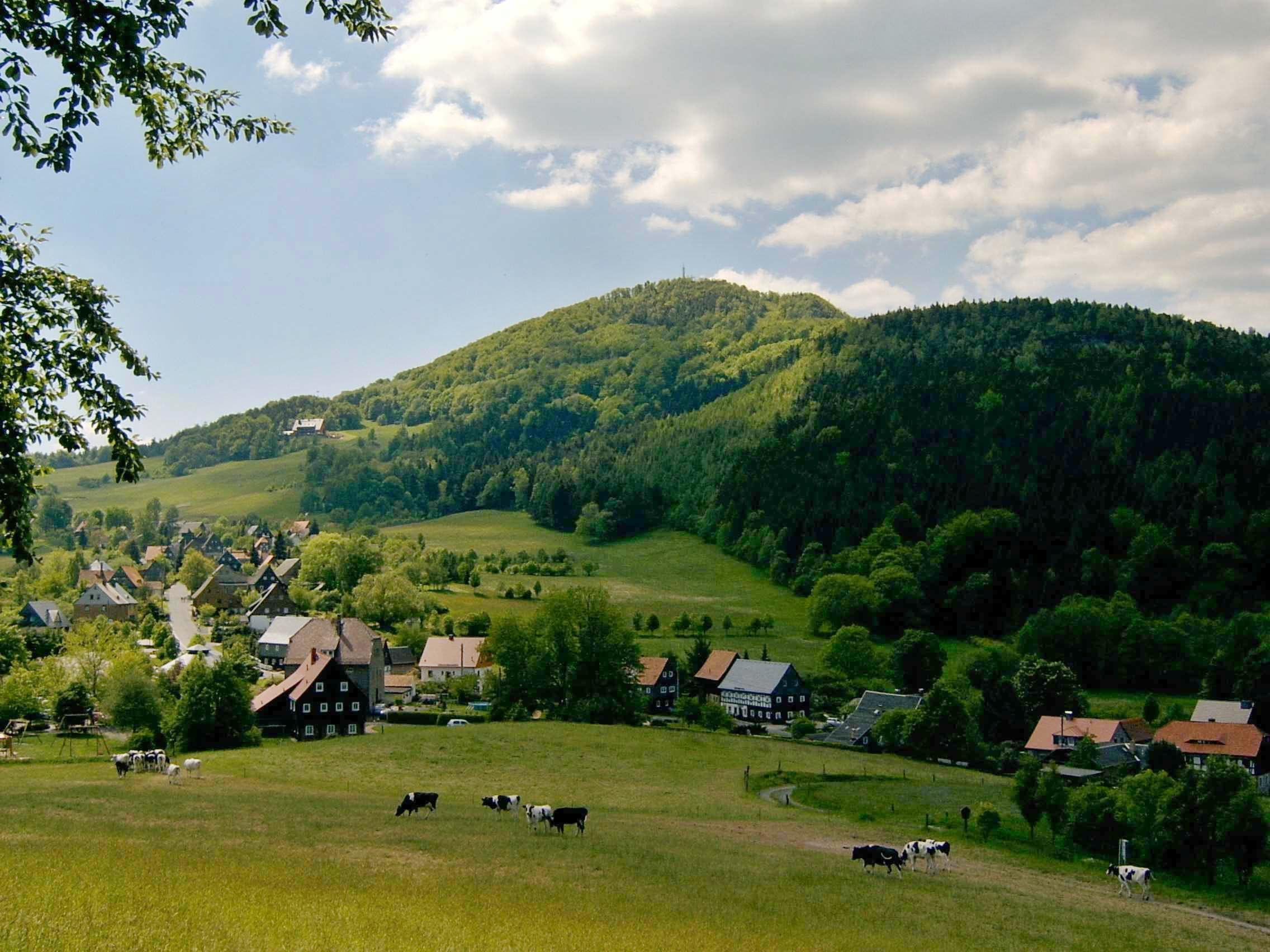
Lausche

The district was established in August 2008 by merging three smaller districts: the district of Löbau-Zittau, Niederschlesischer Oberlausitzkreis (Lower Silesian Upper Lusatia district) and the urban district of Görlitz.

== Geography ==
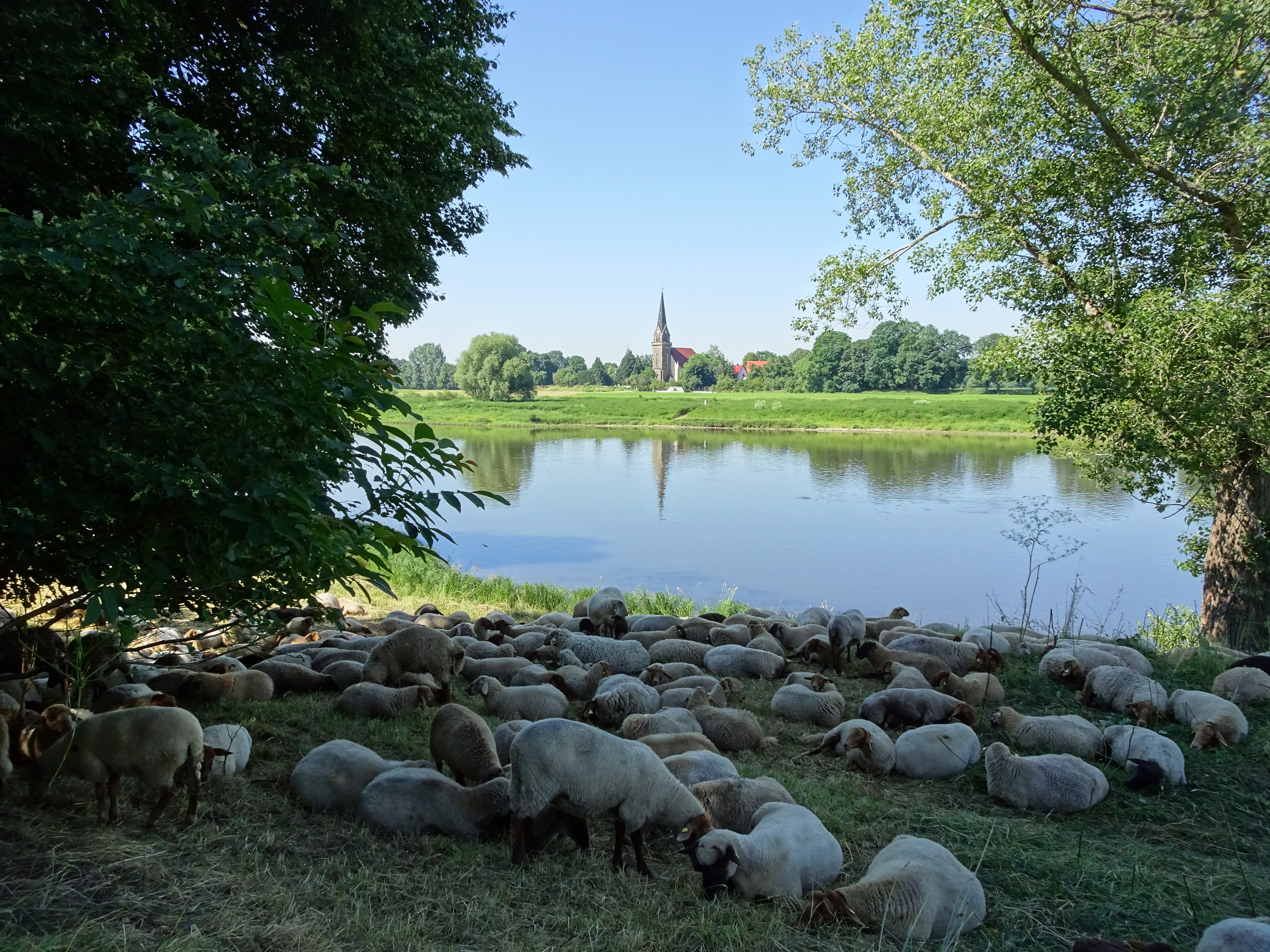
Typical country scene of the area.

The district comprises the south-eastern part of Lusatia and the western part of Silesia, including parts of the Lusatian Mountains.

The Lusatian Neisse forms its eastern border, and the Spree river flows through the western part of the district.

== Coat of arms ==
The coat of arms of Görlitz district contains references to the various territories the district has been part of in the past. The black eagle with the crescent over its chest refers to Silesia. The crowned lion with two tails refers to Bohemia. The wall refers to the town of Bautzen and Upper Lusatia, and the lime leaves refer to the Sorbian community.

== Towns and municipalities ==
Clickable map of towns and municipalities in the district

Towns
Municipalities
- Bad Muskau
- Bernstadt auf dem Eigen
- Ebersbach-Neugersdorf
- Görlitz
- Herrnhut
- Löbau
- Neusalza-Spremberg
- Niesky
- Ostritz
- Reichenbach
- Rothenburg
- Seifhennersdorf
- Weißwasser
- Zittau
- Beiersdorf
- Bertsdorf-Hörnitz
- Boxberg
- Dürrhennersdorf
- Gablenz
- Groß Düben
- Großschönau
- Großschweidnitz
- Hähnichen
- Hainewalde
- Jonsdorf
- Königshain
- Kottmar
- Krauschwitz
- Kreba-Neudorf
- Lawalde
- Leutersdorf
- Markersdorf
- Mittelherwigsdorf
- Oderwitz
- Olbersdorf
- Oppach
- Oybin
- Rietschen
- Rosenbach
- Schleife
- Schönau-Berzdorf
- Schönbach
- Trebendorf
- Vierkirchen
- Weißkeißel

Verwaltungsverbände
1. Diehsa; Hohendubrau; Mücka; Quitzdorf am See; Waldhufen^{1}	2. Weißer Schöps/Neiße; Horka; Kodersdorf^{1}; Neißeaue; Schöpstal
^{1}seat of the Verwaltungsverband;
