= Leutersdorf =

- Municipality
- Location of Leutersdorf within Görlitz district
- Interactive map of Leutersdorf
- Location within Germany Location within Saxony
- Coordinates: 50°57′20″N 14°39′10″E
- Country: Germany
- State: Saxony
- District: Görlitz
- Subdivisions: 6

Government
  - Mayor (2022–29): Bruno Scholze

Area
  - Total: 17.08 km^{2} (6.59 sq mi)
- Elevation: 392 m (1,286 ft)

Population (2025-12-31)
  - Total: 3,292
  - Density: 192.7/km^{2} (499.2/sq mi)
- Time zone: UTC+01:00 (CET)
  - Summer (DST): UTC+02:00 (CEST)
- Postal codes: 02794
- Dialling codes: 03586 / 035842
- Vehicle registration: GR, LÖB, NOL, NY, WSW, ZI
- Website: www.leutersdorf.de

Leutersdorf (German pronunciation: [ˈlɔʏtɐsdɔʁf]; Upper Sorbian: Lutarjecy) is a municipality in the district Görlitz, in Saxony, Germany.
