= Weißkeißel =

Weißkeißel/Wuskidź
- Municipality
- Location of Weißkeißel/Wuskidź within Görlitz district
- Interactive map of Weißkeißel/Wuskidź
- Location within Germany Location within Saxony
- Coordinates: 51°29′N 14°43′E
- Country: Germany
- State: Saxony
- District: Görlitz
- Subdivisions: 3

Government
  - Mayor (2022–29): Andreas Lysk

Area
  - Total: 50.42 km^{2} (19.47 sq mi)
- Elevation: 126 m (413 ft)

Population (2025-12-31)
  - Total: 1,154
  - Density: 22.89/km^{2} (59.28/sq mi)
- Time zone: UTC+01:00 (CET)
  - Summer (DST): UTC+02:00 (CEST)
- Postal codes: 02957
- Dialling codes: 03576
- Vehicle registration: GR, LÖB, NOL, NY, WSW, ZI
- Website: www.weisskeissel.de

Weißkeißel (German) or Wuskidź (Upper Sorbian pronunciation: [ˈwuskʲitʃ]) is a municipality in the district Görlitz, Saxony, Germany.

The municipality is part of the recognized Sorbian settlement area in Saxony. Upper Sorbian has an official status next to German, all villages bear names in both languages.
