= Rosenbach, Görlitz =

- Municipality
- Coat of arms

- Location of Rosenbach, Görlitz within Görlitz district
- Interactive map of Rosenbach, Görlitz
- Location within Germany Location within Saxony
- Coordinates: 51°5′17″N 14°44′10″E
- Country: Germany
- State: Saxony
- District: Görlitz
- Subdivisions: 4

Government
  - Mayor (2022–29): Roland Höhne

Area
  - Total: 23.50 km^{2} (9.07 sq mi)
- Elevation: 237–350 m (778–1,148 ft)

Population (2025-12-31)
  - Total: 1,484
  - Density: 63.15/km^{2} (163.6/sq mi)
- Time zone: UTC+01:00 (CET)
  - Summer (DST): UTC+02:00 (CEST)
- Postal codes: 02708
- Dialling codes: 03585
- Vehicle registration: GR
- Website: gemeinde-rosenbach.de

Rosenbach (Upper Sorbian: Róžkowa) is a municipality in the district Görlitz, in Saxony, Germany which was created in 1994 through the merger of the communities of Bischdorf and Herwigsdorf.
