= Beiersdorf, Saxony =

Beiersdorf
- Municipality
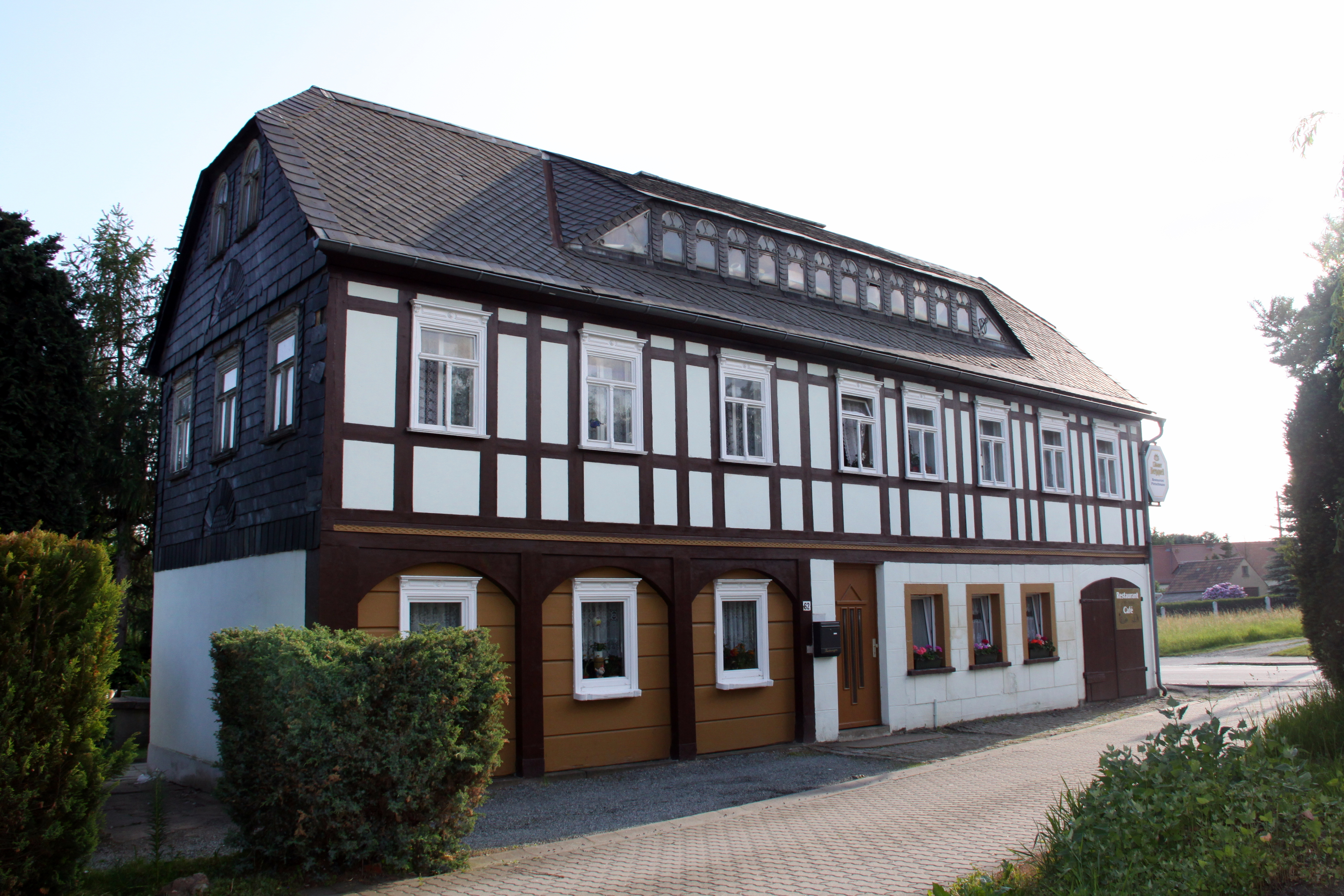
- Umgebindehaus

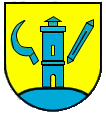
- Coat of arms

- Location of Beiersdorf within Görlitz district
- Interactive map of Beiersdorf
- Location within Germany Location within Saxony
- Coordinates: 51°04′17″N 14°32′7″E
- Country: Germany
- State: Saxony
- District: Görlitz
- Subdivisions: 5

Government
  - Mayor (2022–29): Hagen Kettmann (Ind.)

Area
  - Total: 6.44 km^{2} (2.49 sq mi)
- Elevation: 384 m (1,260 ft)

Population (2025-12-31)
  - Total: 1,013
  - Density: 157/km^{2} (407/sq mi)
- Time zone: UTC+01:00 (CET)
  - Summer (DST): UTC+02:00 (CEST)
- Postal codes: 02736
- Dialling codes: 035872
- Vehicle registration: GR, LÖB, NOL, NY, WSW, ZI

Beiersdorf (Sorbian: Bejerecy) is a municipality in the district Görlitz, in Saxony, Germany.

== Notable residents ==
- The operatic tenor Werner Enders was born in Beiersdorf. Blessed Eduardo Profittlich
