= Waldhufen =

- Municipality
- Location of Waldhufen within Görlitz district
- Interactive map of Waldhufen
- Location within Germany Location within Saxony
- Coordinates: 51°13′N 14°47′E
- Country: Germany
- State: Saxony
- District: Görlitz
- Municipal assoc.: Diehsa

Government
  - Mayor (2022–29): Horst Brückner

Area
  - Total: 58.64 km^{2} (22.64 sq mi)
- Elevation: 163 m (535 ft)

Population (2025-12-31)
  - Total: 2,308
  - Density: 39.36/km^{2} (101.9/sq mi)
- Time zone: UTC+01:00 (CET)
  - Summer (DST): UTC+02:00 (CEST)
- Postal codes: 02906
- Dialling codes: 035827, 03588
- Vehicle registration: GR, LÖB, NOL, NY, WSW, ZI
- Website: www.waldhufen.de

Waldhufen is a municipality in the district Görlitz, Saxony, Germany.
