= Groß Düben =

Groß Düben Dźěwin
- Municipality
- Location of Groß Düben within Görlitz district
- Interactive map of Groß Düben
- Location within Germany Location within Saxony
- Coordinates: 51°34′N 14°34′E
- Country: Germany
- State: Saxony
- District: Görlitz

Government
  - Mayor (2022–29): Sebastian Bertko

Area
  - Total: 14.56 km^{2} (5.62 sq mi)
- Elevation: 132 m (433 ft)

Population (2025-12-31)
  - Total: 1,033
  - Density: 70.95/km^{2} (183.8/sq mi)
- Time zone: UTC+01:00 (CET)
  - Summer (DST): UTC+02:00 (CEST)
- Postal codes: 02959
- Dialling codes: 035773
- Vehicle registration: GR, LÖB, NOL, NY, WSW, ZI
- Website: www.gross-dueben.de

Groß Düben (Upper Sorbian: Dźěwin, pronounced [ˈdʒɪwʲin]) is a municipality in the district Görlitz, Saxony, Germany.

The municipality is part of the recognized Sorbian settlement area in Saxony. Upper Sorbian has an official status next to German, all villages bear names in both languages.
