= Niesky =

- Town
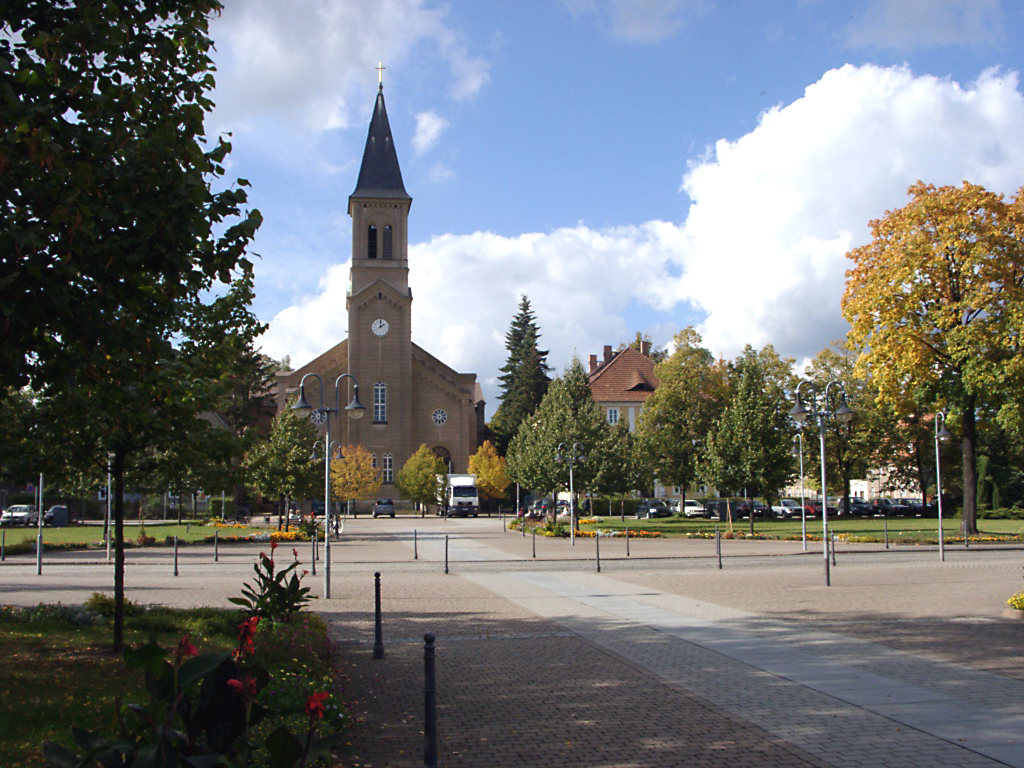
- Zinzendorf Square with Moravian Church

- Flag Coat of arms

- Location of Niesky within Görlitz district
- Interactive map of Niesky
- Location within Germany Location within Saxony
- Coordinates: 51°18′N 14°49′E
- Country: Germany
- State: Saxony
- District: Görlitz

Government
  - Mayor (2021–28): Kathrin Uhlemann (CDU)

Area
  - Total: 53.81 km^{2} (20.78 sq mi)
- Elevation: 172 m (564 ft)

Population (2025-12-31)
  - Total: 8,870
  - Density: 165/km^{2} (427/sq mi)
- Time zone: UTC+01:00 (CET)
  - Summer (DST): UTC+02:00 (CEST)
- Postal codes: 02906
- Dialling codes: 03588
- Vehicle registration: GR, LÖB, NOL, NY, WSW, ZI
- Website: www.niesky.de

Niesky (German pronunciation: [ˈniːski]; Upper Sorbian: Niska [ˈnʲiska]; Czech: Nízké; Polish: Niska) is a small town in Upper Lusatia in eastern Saxony, Germany. It has a population of about 9,200 (2020) and is part of the district of Görlitz.

Historically considered part of Upper Lusatia, it was also part of Lower Silesia from 1815 to 1945.

== History ==
The town was founded in 1742 by Moravian immigrants. As members of the Moravian Church, they fled from persecution in their Catholic homeland. The name Niesky is the Germanised version of the Czech word nízký ("low").

In 1776, at the age of 12, Benjamin Henry Boneval Latrobe, future designer of the United States Capitol, as well as of the Baltimore Basilica, was sent to the Moravian School at Niesky.

Niesky was administered by the Moravian Church until 1892, when a separate civil administration was established. In 1931 it obtained a coat of arms, and in 1935 it was granted town rights. In 1935 a Catholic church was opened.

In 1926 the architect Konrad Wachsmann worked in the timber construction firm Christoph & Unmack AG.

During World War II, the AL Niesky subcamp of the Gross-Rosen concentration camp was located in the town.

On 26 July 1945 the city issued three postage stamps of its own.

== Localities ==
Localities of Niesky are Neuhof, Neusärchen, Neuödernitz, Ödernitz, See, Zeche-Moholz, Kosel, Zedlig and Sandschänke.

== Sport ==
ELV "Tornado" Niesky is an ice sports club based in Niesky.

== Twin town ==
Niesky is twinned with the French town of Albert.

== Gallery ==
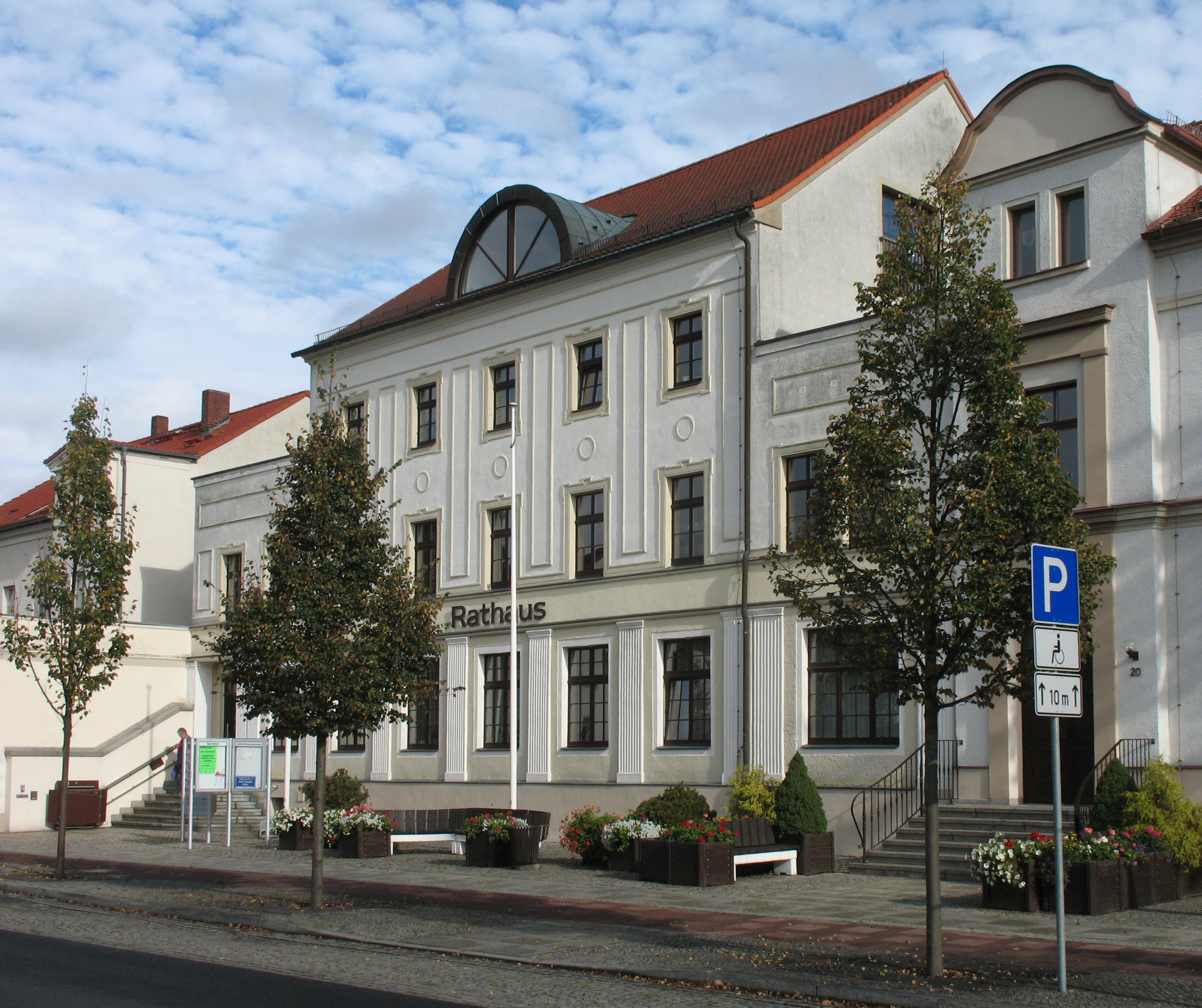
Town hall

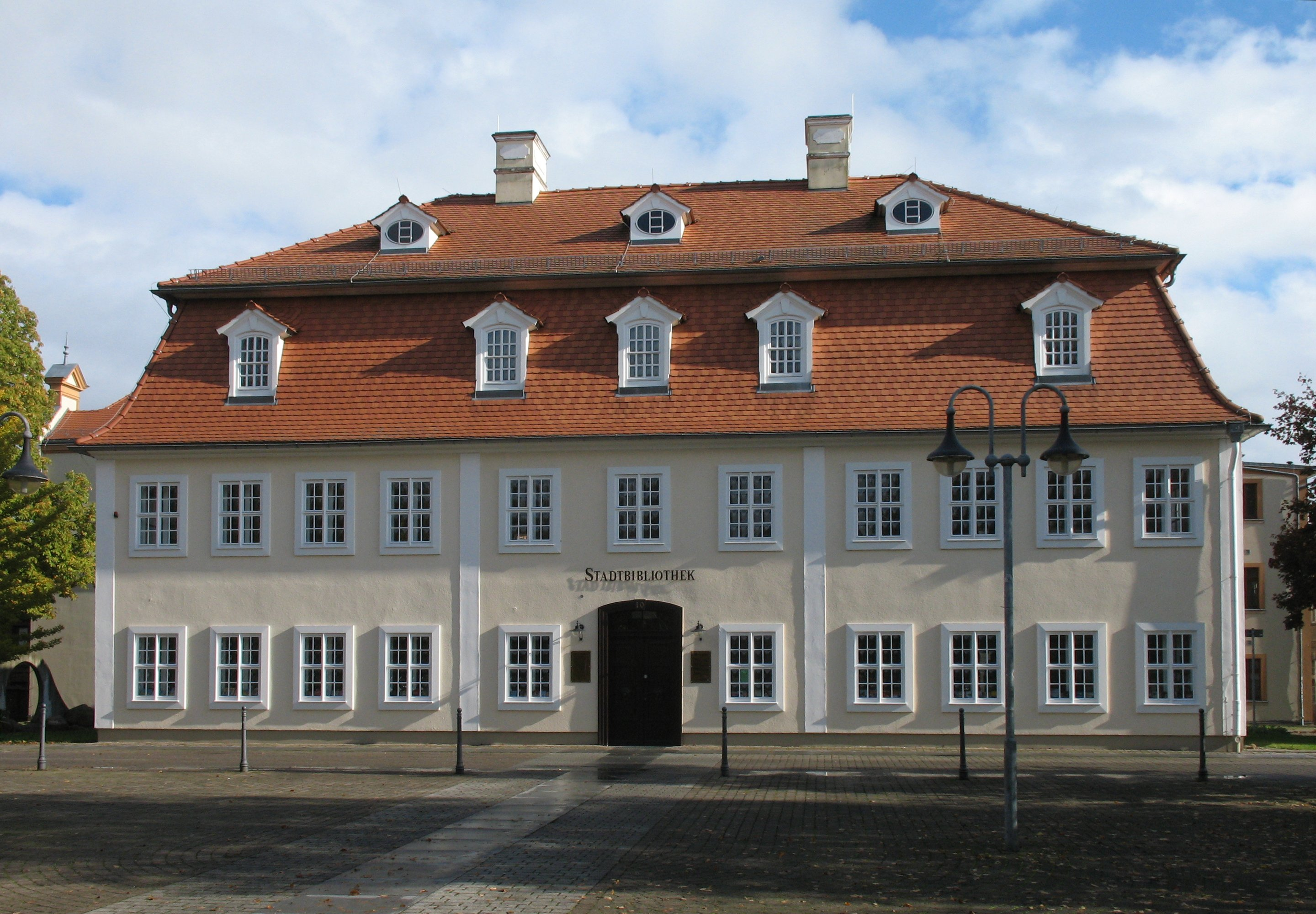
Public library

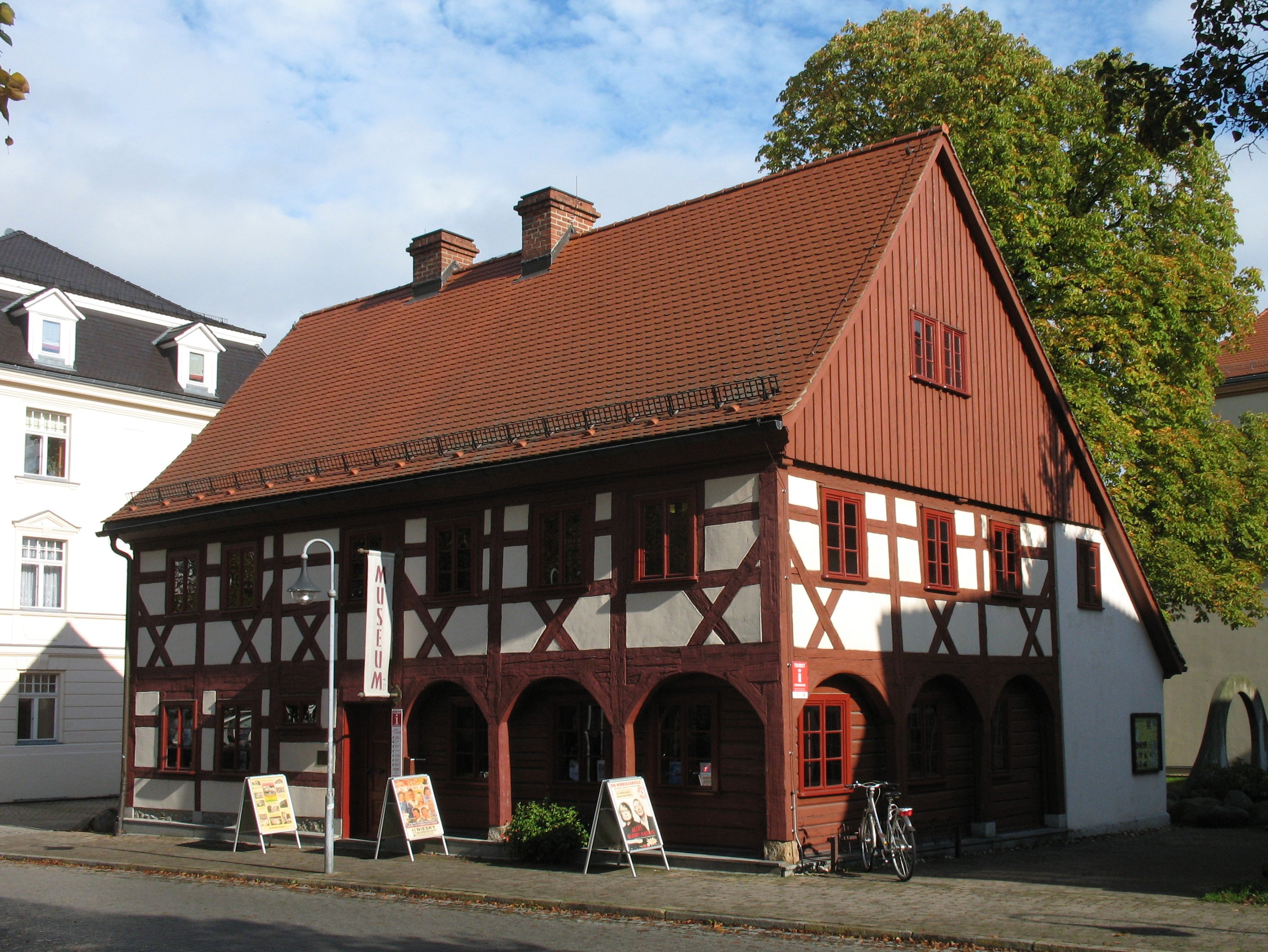
Raschke's house

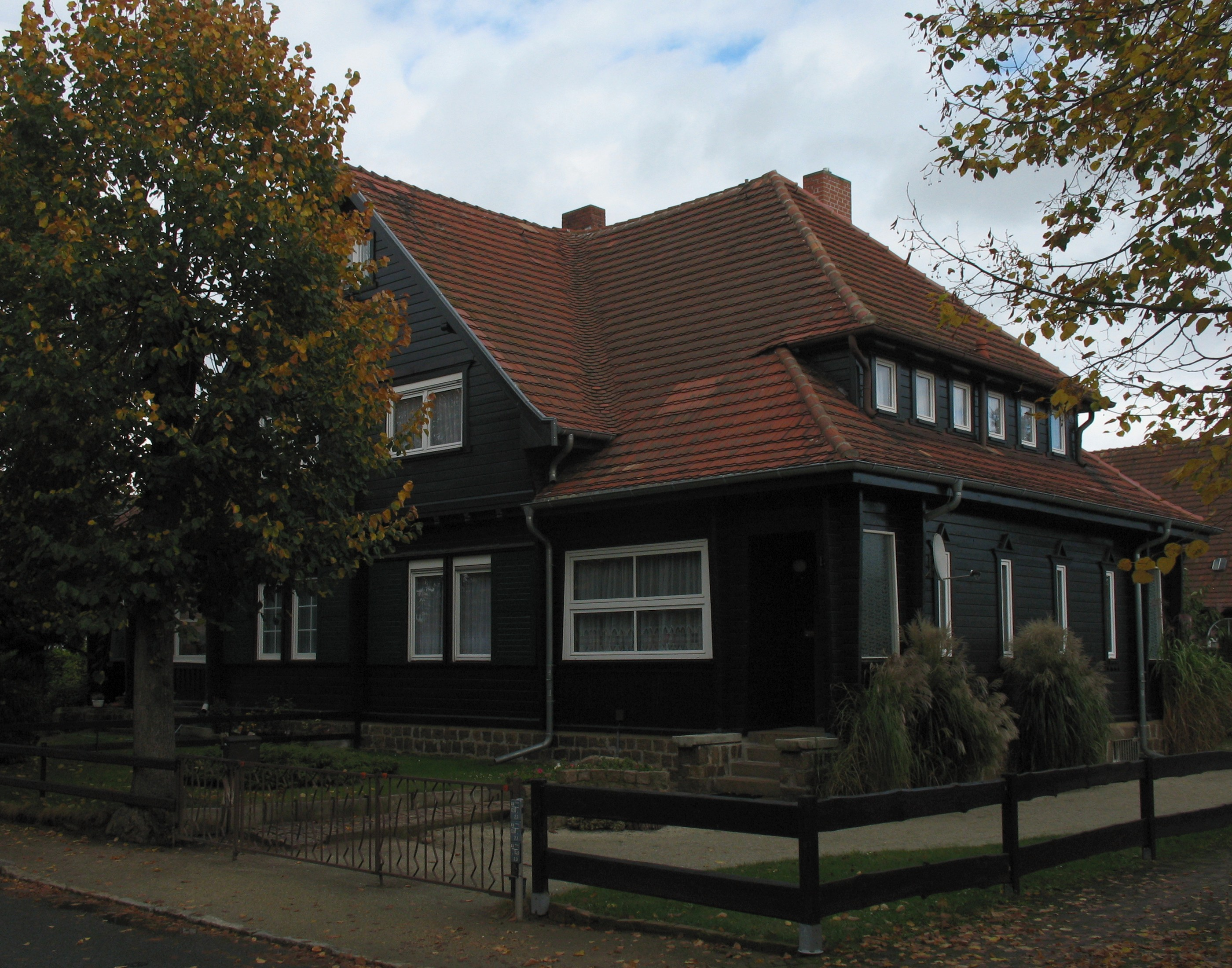
Wooden house (by Christoph & Unmack AG)
