= Königshain =

- Municipality
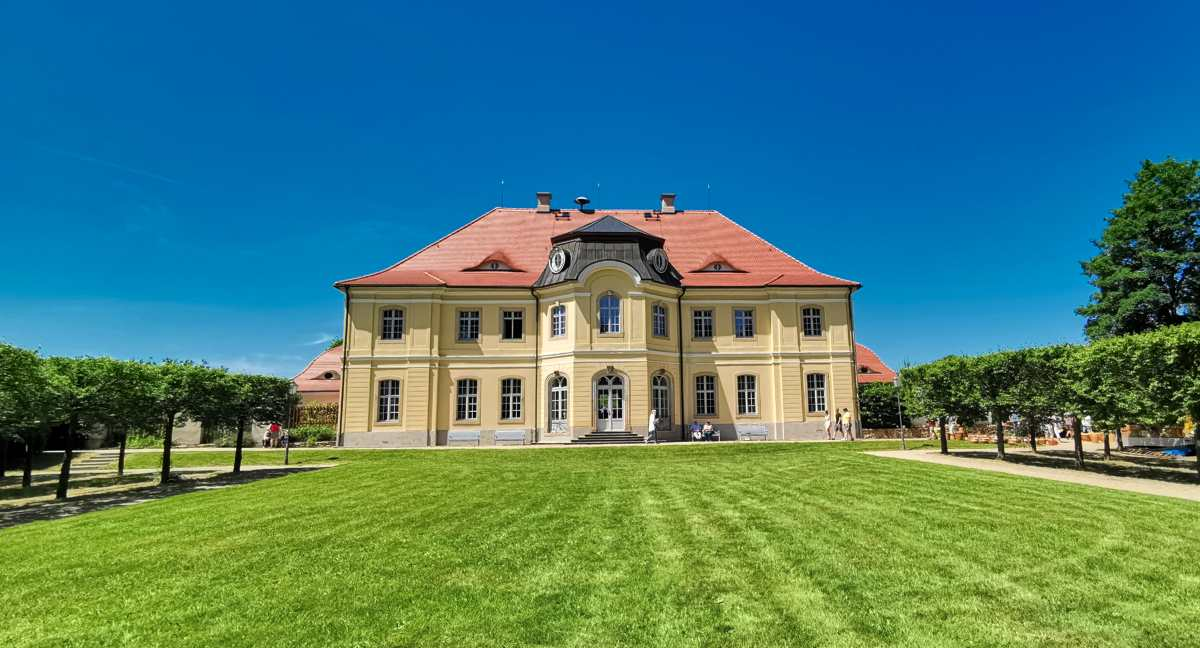
- Königshain Castle

- Coat of arms

- Location of Königshain within Görlitz district
- Interactive map of Königshain
- Location within Germany Location within Saxony
- Coordinates: 51°11′N 14°52′E
- Country: Germany
- State: Saxony
- District: Görlitz

Government
  - Mayor (2022–29): Maik Wobst

Area
  - Total: 19.52 km^{2} (7.54 sq mi)
- Elevation: 233 m (764 ft)

Population (2025-12-31)
  - Total: 1,152
  - Density: 59.02/km^{2} (152.9/sq mi)
- Time zone: UTC+01:00 (CET)
  - Summer (DST): UTC+02:00 (CEST)
- Postal codes: 02829
- Dialling codes: 035826
- Vehicle registration: GR, LÖB, NOL, NY, WSW, ZI
- Website: www.koenigshain.com

Königshain (Upper Sorbian: Kralowski haj, pronounced [ˈkʁalɔfskʲi ˈhaj]) is a municipality in the district Görlitz, Saxony, Germany.
