= Schafberg (Löbau) =

Mountain in Löbau, Germany

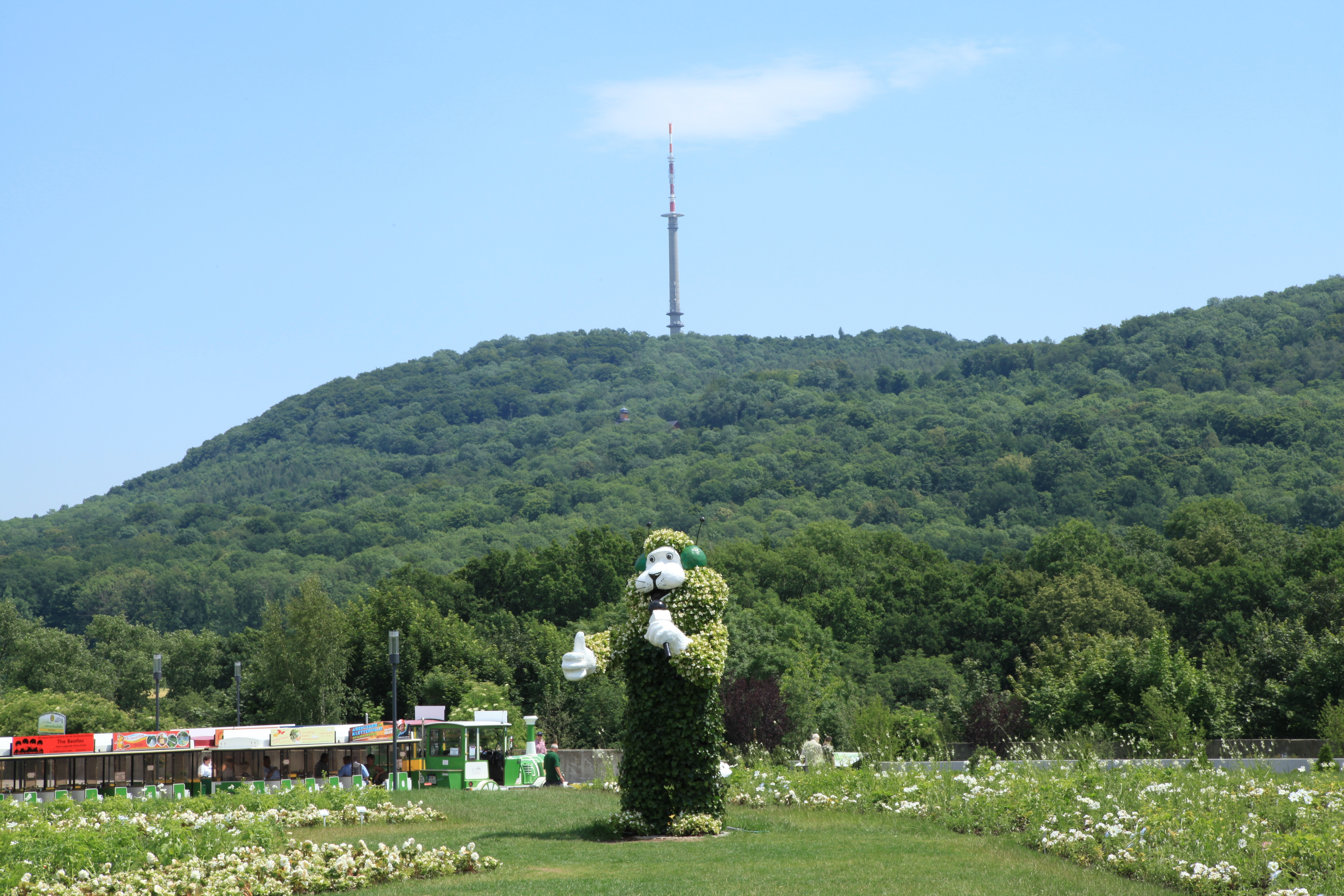
- The Schafberg with its transmission tower

Highest point
- Elevation: 450.5 m above sea level (NHN) (1,478 ft)
- Isolation: 4.7 km → Rotstein
- Listing: – Sender Schafberg – Double summit with the Löbauer Berg
- Coordinates: 51°5′36.9″N 14°41′59.9″E

Geography
- Location within Saxony
- Location: near Löbau, Görlitz county, Saxony (Germany)
- Parent range: Lusatian Highlands

Geology
- Rock age: Tertiary
- Mountain type: cone mountain
- Rock type: Basalt

The Schafberg (Upper Sorbian: Šafberg) is a hill, 450.5 m above NHN, east of Löbau in the Saxon county of Görlitz. Together with the neighbouring Löbauer Berg (447.9 m above NHN) it forms a single hill unit.

== History ==
The story of a rock formation used for the calendrical observation of the sun has been passed down from a prehistoric period. This rock formation is known today as the Geldkeller ("money cellar") and serves as the basis for several legends. In addition, there are the remains of an approximately 3000-year-old ring wall on the mountain, which once served to protect a Bronze Age settlement. For centuries the hill was used as pasture for cattle and sheep, which is why it is also known as the Schafberg. Due to the fact that the hill has only a few springs, keeping livestock was difficult. One of the few places where water could be found on the hill was the spring of Rinnelbrunnen, which was used as a drinking trough. After 1850, keeping animals on the hill was no longer allowed. From 1936 there was an ammunition store at the Löbau barracks at the foot of the hill, which was cleared after 1990. During the Second World War there was an anti-aircraft observation tower on the summit.
