= Upper Lusatia =

Historical region in Germany and modern Poland

Coordinates: 51°10′01″N 14°19′59″E

Upper Lusatia Oberlausitz, Łużyce Górne, Hornja Łužica, Górna Łužyca, Horní Lužice
- Historical region
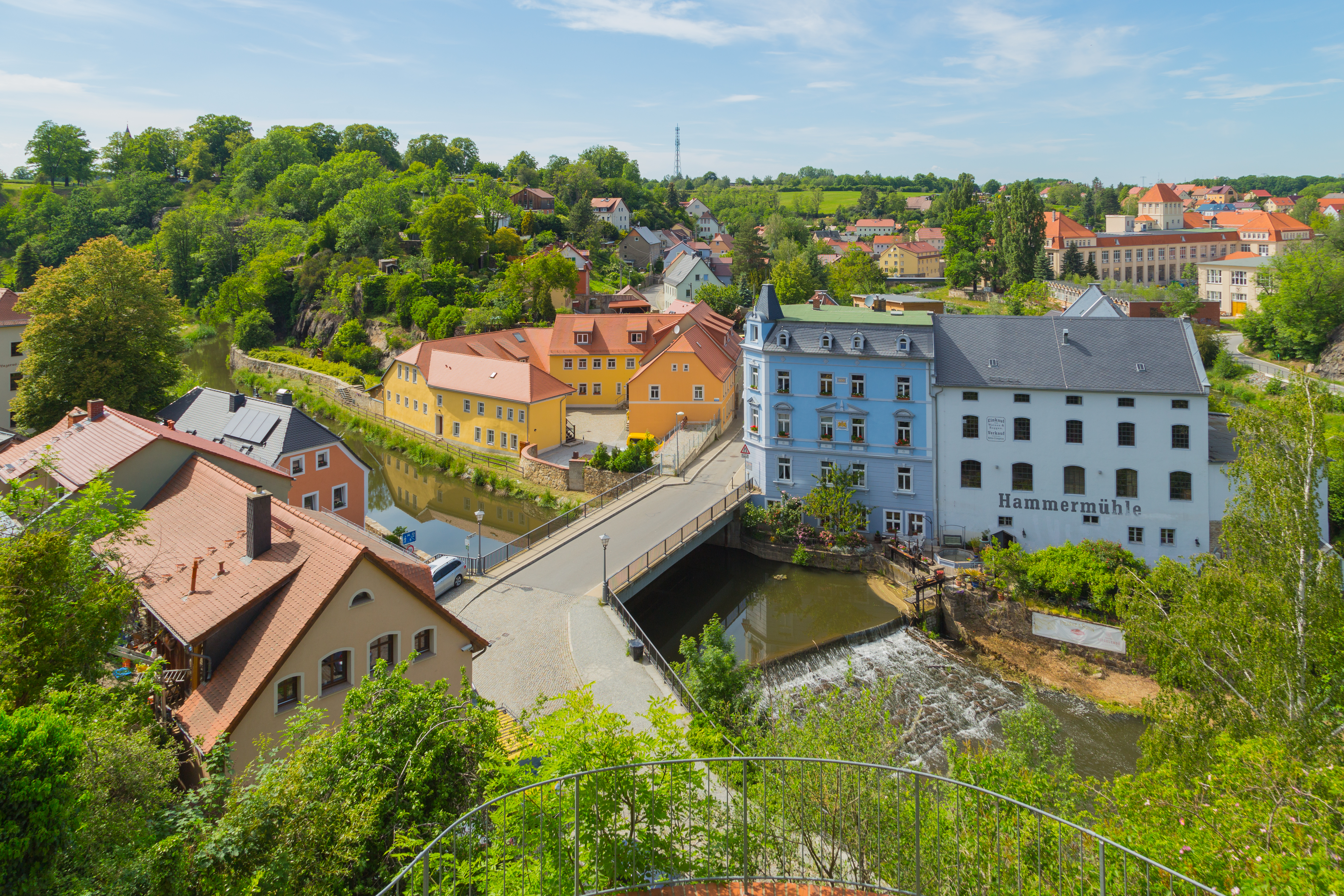
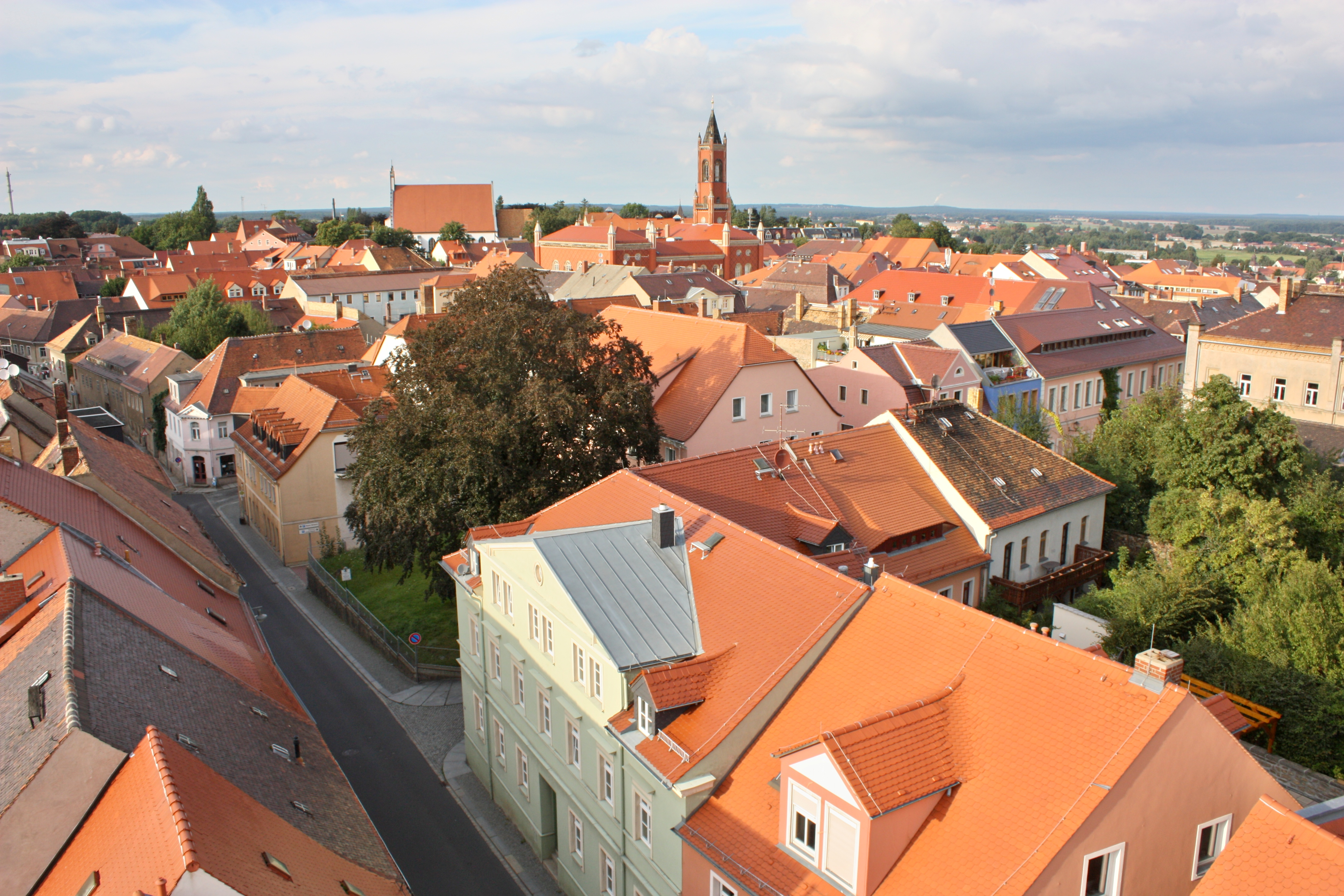
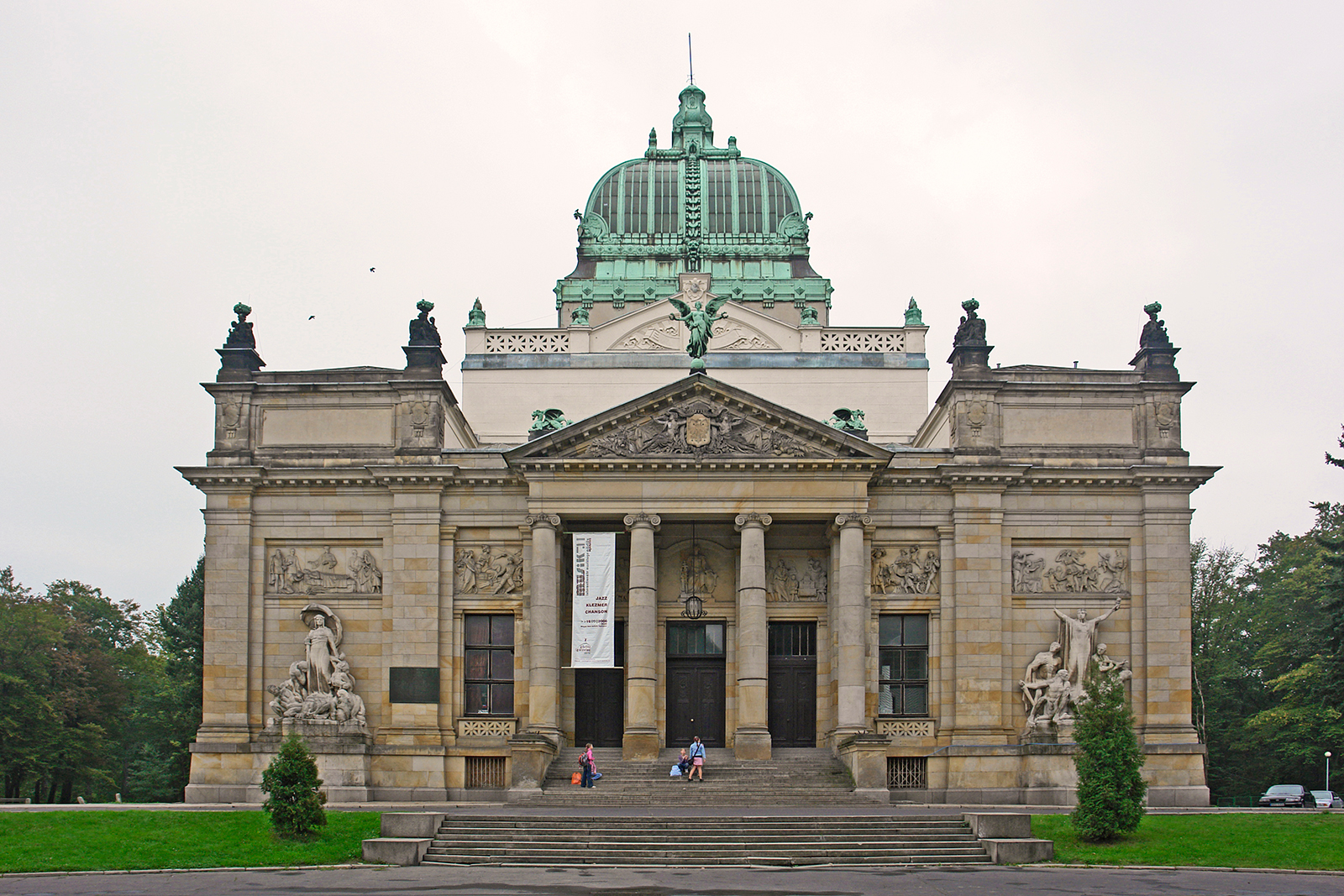
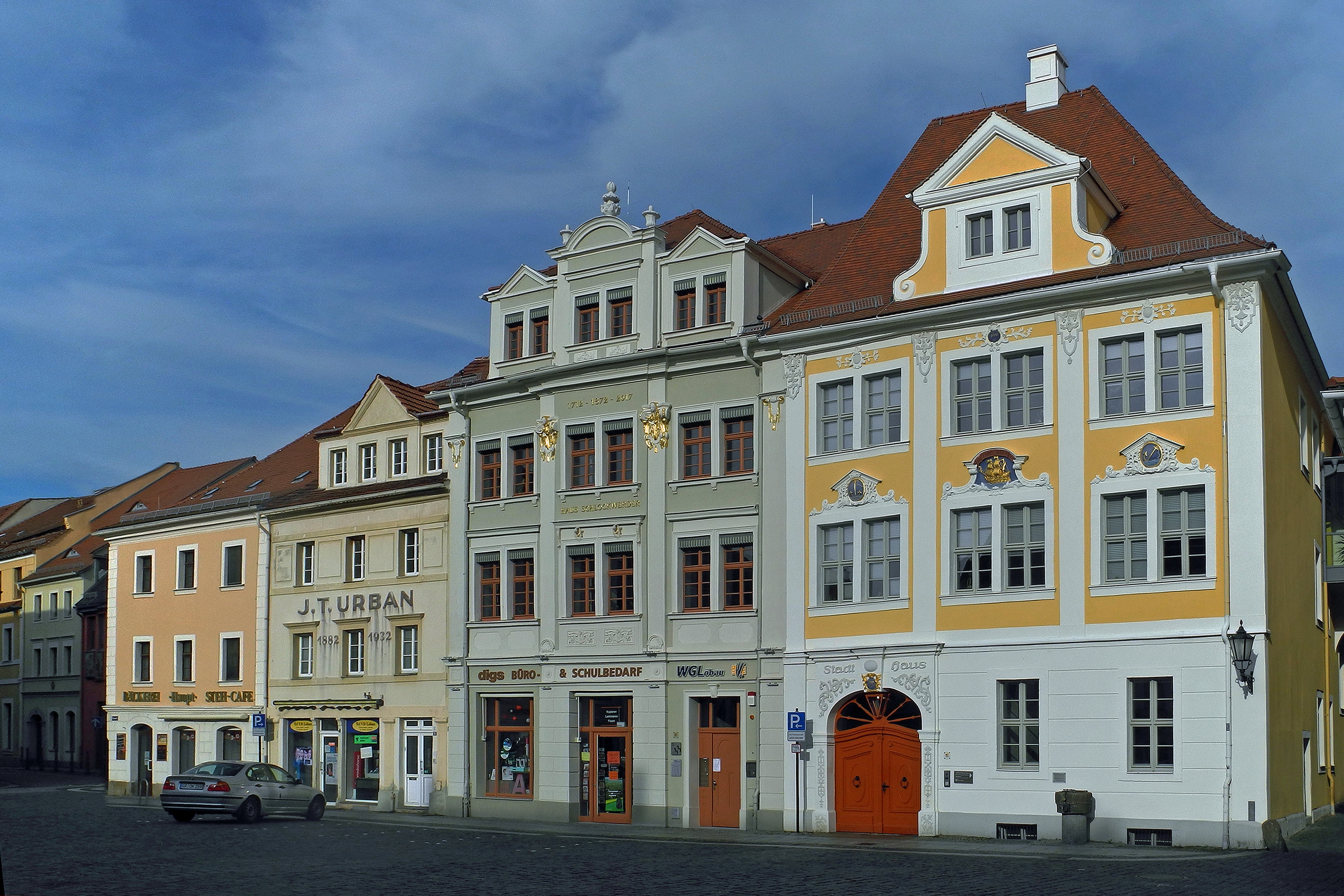
- Bautzen Kamenz Old Town Culture Center in Zgorzelec Market Square in Löbau

- Flag Coat of arms

- Upper Lusatia as a part of the Crown of Bohemia within the Holy Roman Empire (1618)
- Countries: Germany; Poland
- Capital: Bautzen
- Largest town: Görlitz
- Time zone: UTC+1 (CET)
  - Summer (DST): UTC+2 (CEST)

Upper Lusatia (German: Oberlausitz, pronounced [ˈoːbɐˌlaʊzɪts]; Polish: Łużyce Górne or Milsko; Upper Sorbian: Hornja Łužica, pronounced [ˈhɔʁnʲa ˈwuʒitsa]; Lower Sorbian: Górna Łužyca; Czech: Horní Lužice) is a historical region in Germany and modern Poland. Along with Lower Lusatia to the north, it makes up the region of Lusatia, named after the Slavic Lusici tribe. Both parts of Lusatia are home to the West Slavic minority group of the Sorbs.

The major part of Upper Lusatia is part of the German federal state of Saxony, roughly comprising Bautzen district and Görlitz district. The northwestern extremity, around Ruhland and Tettau, is incorporated into the Oberspreewald-Lausitz district of the state of Brandenburg. The eastern part of Upper Lusatia is in Poland, east of the Neisse (Nysa) river, in Lower Silesian Voivodeship. A small strip of land in the north around Łęknica is incorporated into Lubusz Voivodeship, along with the Polish part of Lower Lusatia.

The historic capital of Upper Lusatia is Bautzen/Budyšin, while the largest city in the region is Görlitz/Zgorzelec, halved between Germany and Poland since 1945. The name Lusatia superior was first recorded in a 1474 deed, derived from the adjacent Lower Lusatian lands in the north, which originally were just called the March of Lusatia. The Upper Lusatian territory was previously referred to as Milsko in contemporary chronicles, named after the local West Slavic Milceni tribe, later also called Land Budissin.

== Geography and nature ==
Geomorphological Upper Lusatia is shaped by the uniform Lusatian granite massif, only the north and northeast, the plain of the Upper Lusatian Heath and Pond Landscape is Pleistocene formed. The UNESCO has declared this area a Biosphere Reserve in 1996, in particular for the protection of otters. The middle part is hilly, while the south is characterized by the Lusatian Mountains, the westernmost range of the Sudetes.

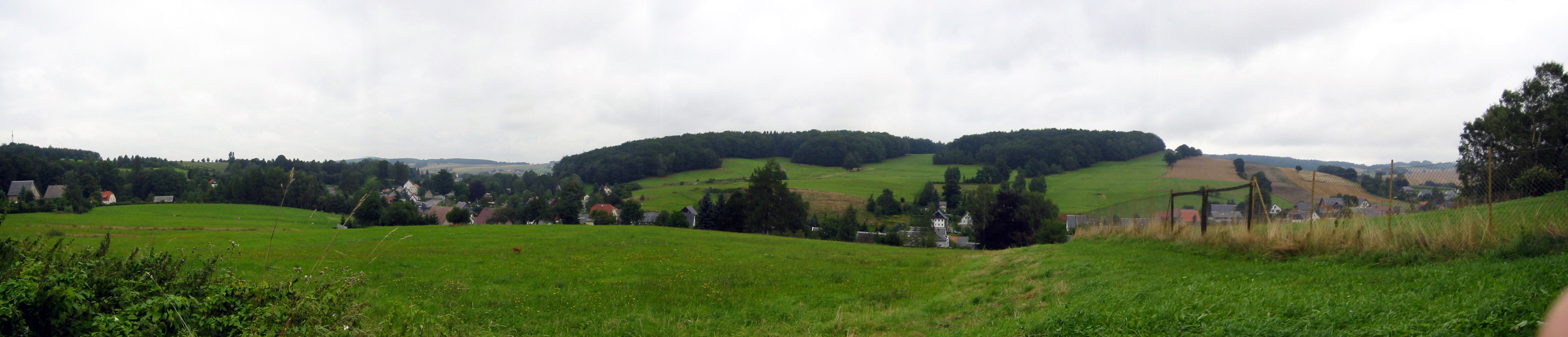
Hilly landscape near Steinigtwolmsdorf, Upper Lusatia

=== Mountains and rivers ===
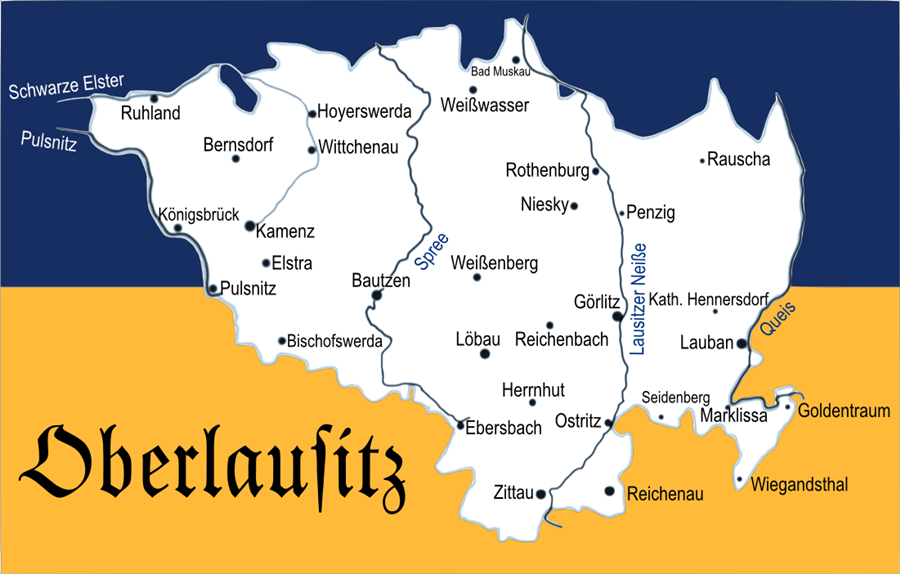
Historic map of Upper Lusatia

The highest elevations of the German part of Upper Lusatia are in the Zittau Mountains (Lusatian Ridge), part of the Lusatian Mountains forming the border with the adjacent Bohemian region in the south, which today belong to the Czech Republic. The highest peaks of the Zittau Mountains are the Lausche at 792.6 m (2,600 ft)and Hochwald at 749 m (2,457 ft). The adjacent Lusatian Highlands comprise the Landeskrone (420 m), Löbauer Berg (448 m), Kottmar (583 m), Czorneboh (561 m), Bieleboh (499 m), and Valtenberg (587 m). However, the highest point of historic Upper Lusatia is the Tafelstein (Tabulový Kámen) in the Polish part, located at 1,123 m (3,684 ft) on the eastern slopes of the Smrk (Smrek) in the Jizera Mountains, the border tripoint of Upper Lusatia with the historical region of Lower Silesia to the east and Bohemia to the south.

All major rivers in the Upper Lusatia flow from south to north. In the west, the Pulsnitz at Königsbrück (the "Gate to Upper Lusatia" on the Via Regia trade route) formerly marked the border with the Meissen lands of the Saxon Electorate. The Spree river has its source in the Lusatian Highlands in the far south of the country and flows through Bautzen. The Lusatian Neisse has formed the German-Polish border since 1945. The river rises in the Czech Jizera Mountains, enters Upper Lusatia near Zittau, flows through Görlitz/Zgorzelec and leaves the country at Bad Muskau for Lower Lusatia. Most of the smaller rivers are called -wasser (water), often in combination with the name of a village which the stream flows through. The eastern border of Upper Lusatia with Lower Silesia is marked by the River Kwisa, who flows past Lubań and continues north towards the Silesian lands into the Bóbr river.

The central hilly Gefilde (Pahórčina) landscape between Kamenz and Löbau was especially well suited for agriculture and is still very profitable. In the 19th century, in the northern part of Upper Lusatia, in the east on both sides of the Neisse river and around Hoyerswerda large quantities of brown coal were found. Especially the digging in open pits has destroyed large parts of the old cultural landscape. Currently the Nochten pit south of Weißwasser and Turów near Bogatynia in the Polish part are still active. Many of the old coal mines have been restored since the 1970s, especially after 1990, when particular attention was paid to revitalize the landscape. The newly formed lakes are already named and advertised as the Lusatian Lake District.

=== Natural regions ===
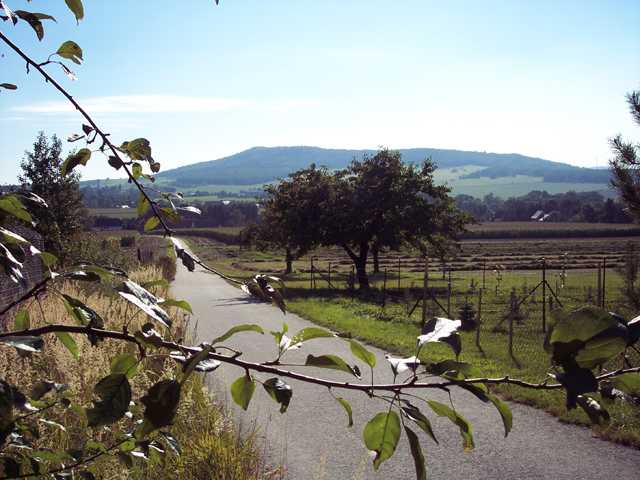
View from Sohland to Mt Rotstein

Today, Upper Lusatia is grouped into eight natural regions or landscapes:

- The Zittau Mountains (southeastern tip of Upper Lusatia)
- The East Lusatian Hill Country and River Neisse region (on the Neisse from Görlitz to Zittau, north of the Zittau Mountains)
- The Lusatian Highlands (southern Upper Lusatia to Bohemia)
- The Northwest Lusatian Highlands (northwest from Bischofswerda to Kamenz)
- The Upper Lusatian Gefilde region (around Bautzen and Löbau north of the Highlands)
- The Upper Lusatian Heath and Lake District (east of Kamenz to Niesky)
- The Königsbrück-Ruhland Heaths in the northwest (northwest of Kamenz, west of Hoyerswerda)
- The Muskau Heath in the northeast (around Bad Muskau and Weisswasser, Poland, in the east)

== History ==
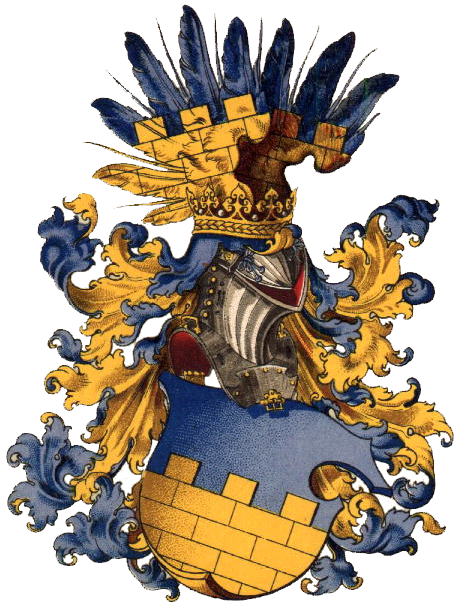
Coat of arms of Upper Lusatia, as drawn by Hugo Gerard Ströhl

The hunters of the Middle Stone Age (until about 8000 BC) only crossed through the area. Even the oldest agricultural cultures (4500 BC to 3300 BC) left behind only little evidence of settlement. In the early Bronze Age (11th century BC to 9th century BC) people of the Lusatian culture entered the previously uninhabited region from Bohemia and the Lusatian Neisse. Archeological evidence documents a path between the settlement areas around Bautzen/Budyšin and Zittau/Žitawa. A fortified hill from the 10th century BC, the Schafsberg near Löbau/Lubij played a special role. Another significant settlement was on the cliff above the Spree river, where in the course of history Bautzens Ortenburg was built, dominant and administrative center of what would become Upper Lusatia.

=== Early Middle Ages ===
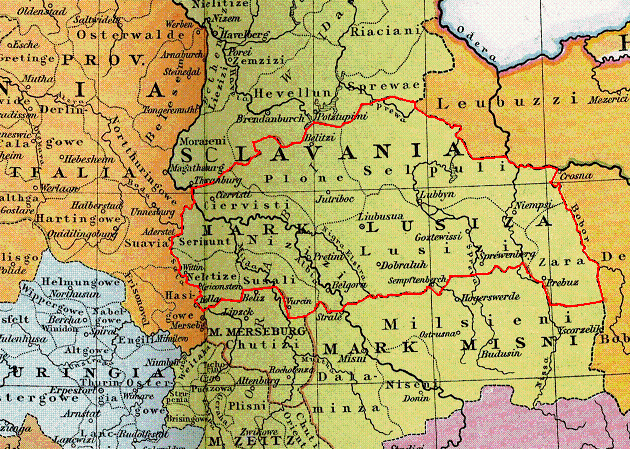
March of Lusatia (outlined) and Milsieni Land, 1886 map

Slavs settled in the region from the 7th century. In the area between today's cities of Kamenz/Kamjenc and Löbau the Sorbian tribe of the Milceni was located. Their center was a fortified town at the site of today's Ortenburg in Bautzen. Another early Slavic settlement was situated in the valley of the Neisse river. The rural Sorbian population erected numerous hill forts, which were tribal centers as well as the residences of Slavic nobility.

The independent development of the West Slavic tribes was interrupted in the 10th century by the expansion of the German state of East Francia. With the raids of 921/922 and 928/929 King Henry the Fowler initiated a period of military subjugation of the Polabian Slavs. In 932 the Milceni were forced to pay tribute. After Henry's death in 936 the Milceni once again became independent, but were subdued again in 939 by King and later Emperor Otto I (936–973). In the early 960s, the neighboring Slavic Lusatians (in modern Lower Lusatia) were attacked by count Gero I, commander of the Saxon frontier regions, who forced them to subdue and pay tribute, and in the same time Meissen became the main German outpost in southern regions, among Slavic Milceni and Daleminzi, thus leading to the establishment of the March of Meissen.

All the major wall ring castles in the border areas were strengthened and prepared as starting points for further conquests. In place of the Milceni castles, German Burgwards appeared (first mentioned 1006), such as the Ortenburg Castle in Bautzen, or the castles of Göda/Hodźij and Doberschau/Dobruša. In the year 1002 the city of Bautzen was first mentioned by the chronicler Thietmar of Merseburg. Until the second half of the 10th century the fights continued, and in 990 the Milceni were again subdued by Margrave Eckard I of Meissen. The church in regions of Slavic Milceni and Daleminzi was assigned to the Diocese of Meissen in 968. In 1007, the diocese received the first donation in Milceni lands, the castles Ostrusna (probably Ostritz) and Godobi (Göda).

Soon, however, the German feudal rule was threatened by the ascending Kingdom of Poland and its western expansion. In 1002 Bolesław I Chrobry conquered all regions of Slavic Lusatians, Milceni and Daleminzi, and forced German king Henry II to enfeoff him with the Gau Milsca. After several volatile and bitter feuds both parties signed the Peace of Bautzen on 30 January 1018, which assigned the regions of Slavic Lusatians and Milceni to Poland. After the victory of Emperor Conrad II over the Polish king Mieszko II Lambert in 1031, both regions again came under the German rule, as confirmed by the 1033 Treaty of Merseburg, and thus Milceni were placed again under jurisdiction of the Meissen margraves.

=== High Middle Ages ===
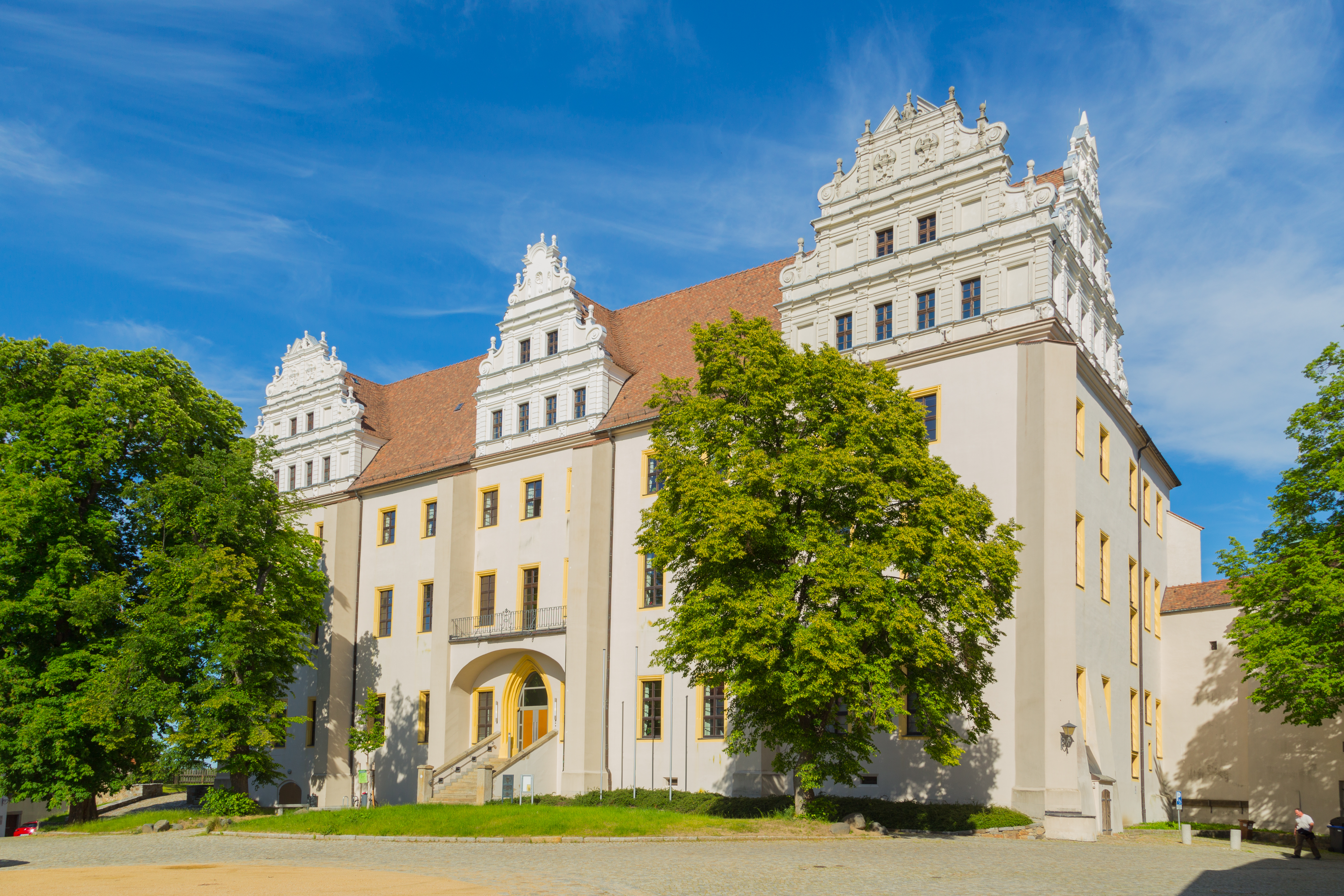
Ortenburg Castle, Bautzen

During the Investiture Controversy in 1076, King Henry IV of Germany granted Budissin Land to Duke Vratislaus II of Bohemia as an Imperial fief in turn for his support in the Saxon Rebellion. The son-in-law of Vratislaus, Count Wiprecht of Groitzsch, ruled it independently from 1084 to 1108 residing at Ortenburg Castle. In 1091, a further donation to the church was made, when Henry IV transferred five other villages in the Milzenerland, four of them south of Göda. For 1144 it is documented that the Zagost province, an area southeast of Görlitz around Zawidów (Seidenberg), was a part of Budissin Land. Also in this region, the Diocese of Meissen was equipped with possessions. Upper Lusatia reached the Kwisa (Queis), the border to Silesia and its largest expansion to the east, already in the 12th century.

In 1156 Emperor Frederick Barbarossa signed an alliance with the Přemyslid duke Vladislaus II of Bohemia. He not only promised him the royal crown but also the investiture with Ortenburg Castle and Land Budissin, which both became reality two years later. Therewith the first Bohemian period in the history of Upper Lusatia, with far-reaching consequences for the development of the country, began.

In the first century of Přemyslid rule all major towns of Upper Lusatia, and all major religious institutions of the country – apart from the older Bautzen – were established. The Meissen bishop Bruno II from 1213 to 1218 established the college of St. Peter in Bautzen, which was richly endowed by King Ottokar I of Bohemia and his successors; Queen Kunigunde in 1234 donated the Cistercian monastery of St. Marienthal, which was subjected to the Diocese of Prague in 1244, and Bishop Bernhard in 1248 founded the second Cistercian monastery of St. Marienstern in Kuckau/Kukow.

The forest clearance from about the year 1100, mainly by Sorbian peasants, expanded the cultivated land. New places in the northern area around Hoyerswerda/Wojerecy arose. The country's expansion intensified in the middle of the 12th century under the Bohemian kings, which was almost carried out as a competition with the Meissen bishops. German peasants, who cleared the large forest areas and created many new villages, were brought into the country in the course of the Ostsiedlung. Often Slavic (Sorbian) hamlets were also extended by German settlers. The new German farmers were legally better off than the old-established population. The majority of the Sorbians peasants were serfs and had to perform serjeanty. The new (mostly German) villages could manage their affairs also relatively autonomously. However, when Sorbian peasants were involved in the Landesausbau development of the country, they enjoyed the same rights as the German colonists.

Due to immigration from the west of the Elbe River, over time a separate Upper Lusatian nobility emerged. This nobility controlled the land on behalf of the king or the margraves and in return received the country as a fief. Unlike in neighbouring Bohemia, the nobles held no allodial titles, as the conquered Milceni Land as a whole belonged to the king. In 1241 the boundary between the possessions of the Meissen bishops and the Bohemian Crown in Upper Lusatia were agreed by contract. For centuries, from as early as the Middle Ages, trade flourished, and several important trade routes ran through Lusatia, connecting German states in the west, Poland in the east and Bohemia in the south.

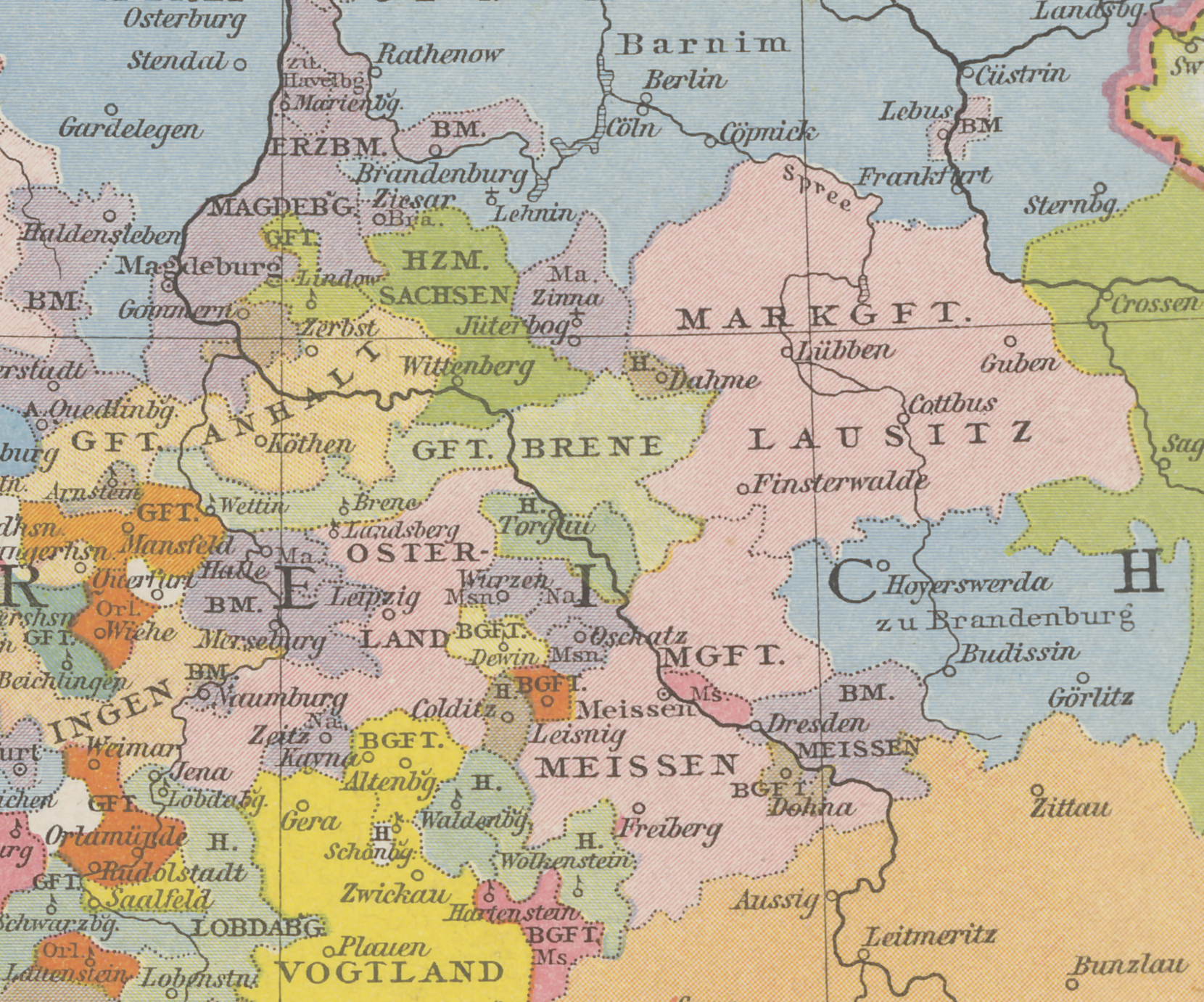
Upper Lusatia (blue) held by the Margraves of Brandenburg, c. 1253-1319

Between the death of King Wenceslaus I of Bohemia in 1253 and 1262, the Ascanian margraves of Brandenburg attained Budissin Land. Neither the exact date of the acquisition nor the legal form of ownership – feud, marriage or pledge rule – can be established with certainty. With the establishment of a Landvogt as deputy of the Ascanian ruler they created the most important office in Upper Lusatia. In principle, the powers of the burggraves and judges from Bohemians time were united in one hand and even expanded. The Landvogt was the country's highest official, he decided in feudal matters, presided in the supreme court and was military commander-in-chief. The Landvogts remained in power until after the Thirty Years' War, although the administrative practice changed frequently.

During the reign of the House of Ascania the division of Upper Lusatia into the countries of Bautzen (Budissin) and Görlitz by Margrave Otto IV of Brandenburg in 1268 was the most important event. Although the autonomy of Görlitz Land ended in 1329 (shortly revived under Duke John of Görlitz between 1377 and 1396), it permanently divided the Upper Lusatian nobility and the municipal administration. In Görlitz Land henceforth own meetings nobility took place, which also remained the case after the reunification of the two countries. The town of Görlitz, centre of the eastern phalf, rapidly gained importance and became economically the strongest city of Upper Lusatia.

After the extinction of the Ascanian dynasty in 1319, the rulers of the neighboring territories, including King John of Bohemia from the mighty House of Luxembourg, claimed Upper Lusatia for themselves. The Bohemian king again received the western lands around Bautzen in 1319 from Emperor Louis the Bavarian. The eastern part with Görlitz, Zittau and Lubań passed to the Duchy of Jawor, the southwesternmost duchy of fragmented Piast-ruled Poland. In 1329 Duke Henry I of Jawor had to cede Görlitz to the Bohemian king, but retained the remaining towns. In the same year John incorporated the terra et civitas goerlic into the Bohemian Crown, which tied Upper Lusatia closely and permanently with the Kingdom of Bohemia, without affecting Upper Lusatias internal order.

==== Lusatian League ====
In 1346 the five royal cities of Upper Lusatia and Zittau, which had fallen to Bohemia upon the death of Duke Henry of Jawor, founded the Lusatian League. The united forces of the cities should secure the public peace and override local robber barons. This was also in the sense of the sovereign, King Charles IV, who supported the League with numerous privileges. The six municipalities in the subsequent period were able to prevail successfully against the nobility. With their increased economic prosperity they gained political influence. They were able to purchase numerous villages in the following 200 years and a significant proportion of the country fell under the direct rule of the city councils. In addition, within the so-called Weichbild enlarged municipal area, they were able to enforce their jurisdiction over large parts of the local nobility and its possessions.

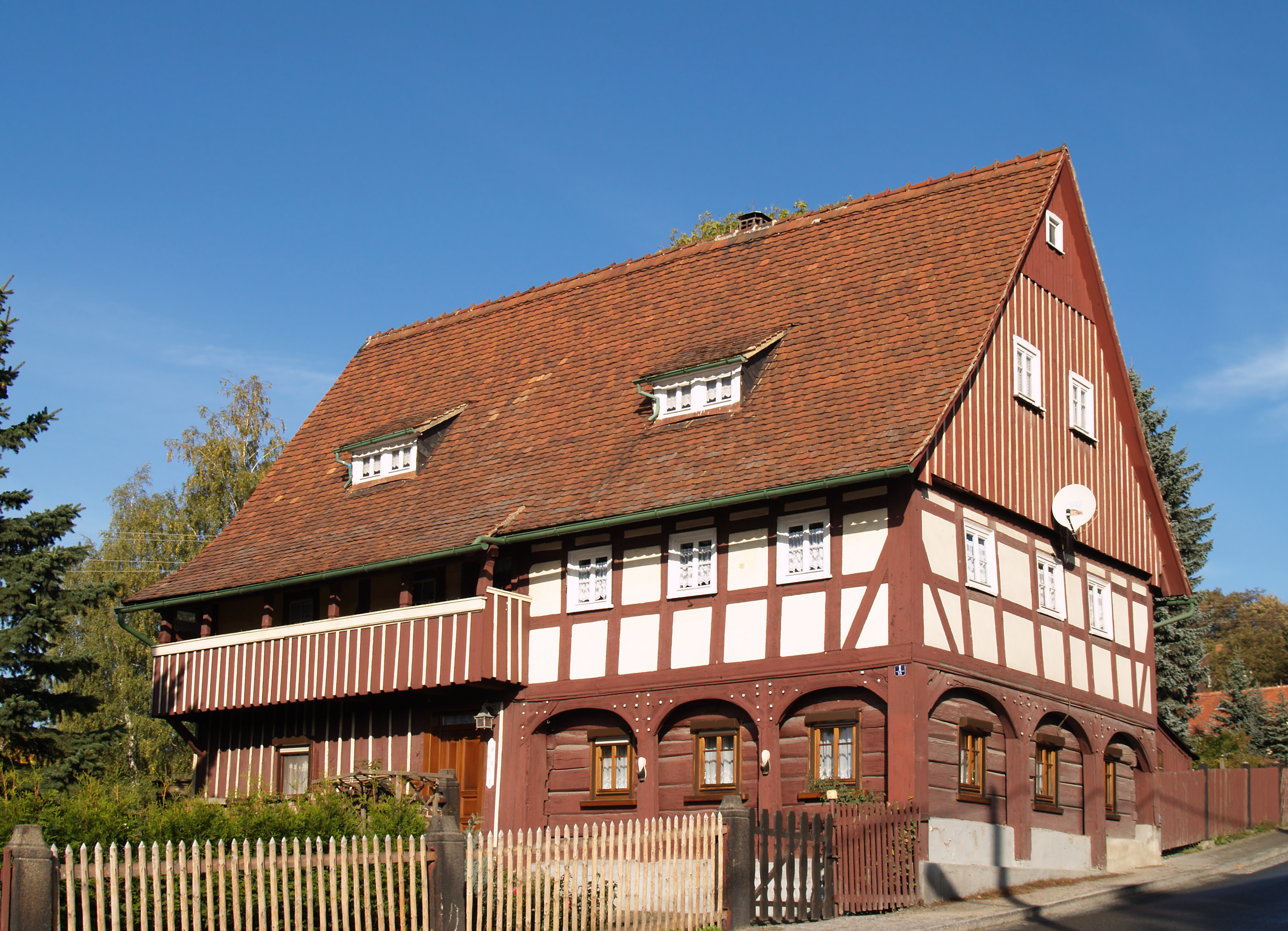
Typical Upper Lusatian house in Ebersbach

When the Hussite revolution erupted in the beginning of the 15th century in Bohemia, the League took up an adverse stance over the Czech Reformation. In alliance with Emperor Sigismund and Lower Lusatian nobles, the cities waged war against the insurgents. In turn Kamenz, Reichenbach and Löbau, as well as Zittau and Lubań were conquered by the Hussites and devastated. Only the two largest cities, Bautzen and Görlitz, could stand up to the sieges. The Hussite Wars eased the links of Upper Lusatia to the Bohemian Crown, and because of the weakness of the kingdom the internal affairs of the margraviate were regulated largely without royal interference. During this time the Upper Lusatian Landtag (diet) developed into the main instrument of the estates' autonomy.

In 1469 the Upper Lusatian estates even seceded from the Bohemian king George of Poděbrady, because of his utraquist confession, which the Pope had condemned as heretical. Upper Lusatia rendered homage to his rival, the Hungarian king Matthias Corvinus, who had conquered Moravia, Silesia and both Lusatias, but never ruled in Bohemia itself. Until the 1479 Peace of Olomouc with King Vladislaus II, the Lusatian League took part in Matthias' war for the Bohemian Crown. Matthias tried to manage his country more efficient. In Silesia, he therefore installed the office of an Oberlandeshauptmann (Upper State Governor), to whom both Lusatias were subjected. This was considered a threat to autonomy by the Upper Lusatian estates.

Upon the death of Matthias Corvinus in 1490, Upper Lusatia again became a constituent Land of the Bohemian Crown. The hated Landvogt of King Matthias, Georg von Stein, was immediately expelled from Bautzens Ortenburg. At the end of the 15th century the political system of the margraviate was largely stabilized. Deputy of the absent sovereign remained the Landogt, who traditionally descended from the nobility of the Bohemian crown lands. However, before 1620, only one Upper Lusatian noble was able to assume the office. In Bautzen and Görlitz moreover two Amtshauptmänner existed. These three officials, with several secretaries, formed the entire royal administration.

The country's centre of power was the Landtag assembly of the estates. Ever since the 15th century prelates, nobles and cities could, without the consent of the king's, assemble and take decisions. Thus, the Landtag was, next to the king, the legislative body of Upper Lusatia. The power of the cities had the effect that there were only two voting estates:

1. the rural Landstände, consisting of the Freiherren (barons), the collegiate chapters of St. Marienstern, St. Marienthal, the Magdalene convent in Lubań and the cathedral foundation in Bautzen, as well as the Ritter chivalry,
2. the six cities of the Lusatian League.

The cities had extensive judicial powers over the subjects of many knights and over the nobles themselves. The supreme court was the court of the land and the cities, which was formed together by both estates. According to the privilegium de non-appellando, a decision was final and couldn't be changed at the royal courts in Prague. The cities' supremacy remained a thorn in the side of the Upper Lusatian nobility.

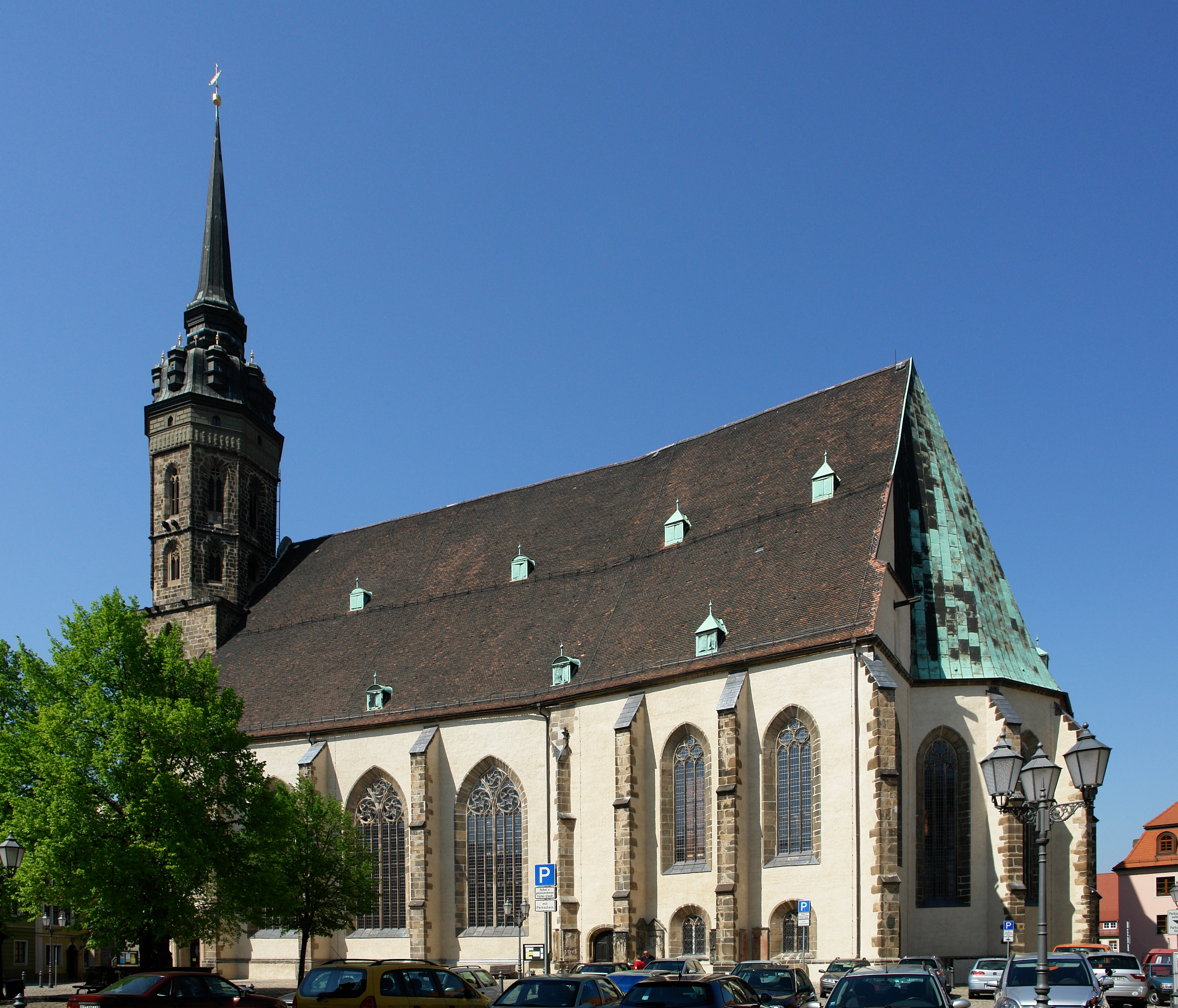
St. Peter's Church in Bautzen

Only a few years after Martin Luther put up The Ninety-Five Theses in Saxon Wittenberg, his Reformative ideas spread all over Upper Lusatia. In Görlitz, Bautzen and Zittau, the first Protestant sermons were preached in 1520 and 1521, although the nobility, the city councils and King Louis II of Bohemia tried to prevent its spread. In Görlitz and Bautzen the municipal authorities however soon conceded the pressure of the population and officially adopted the Protestant Reformation in 1523 and 1524, though only in small cautious steps. In particular, the chapter of St. Peter in Bautzen resisted successfully and remained Catholic. Overall, it took decades until the Lutheran doctrine finally prevailed in most parishes, as in Upper Lusatia not the Bohemian sovereign introduced the Reformation but the local city councils and noble lords.

=== Habsburg Monarchy ===
When King Louis II was killed at the 1526 Battle of Mohács, his crown lands including Upper Lusatia were inherited by his Habsburg brother-in-law Archduke Ferdinand I of Austria, husband of the late king's sister Anne of Bohemia. During his only visit in 1537, he received the homage by the estates; however the rule was entrusted to the Bohemian Hofmeister Zdislav Berka of Dubá as Landvogt in Bautzen, who was not able to reach a settlement between the League and the local nobility. King Ferdinand himself took contradictory decisions, that did not resolve the continuous struggle over the hegemony in the Upper Lusatian lands. The stance of the nobility was strengthened with the establishment of the Upper Lusatian state countries of Muskau, Seidenberg, Hoyerswerda, and Königsbrück.

King Ferdinand was dependent on support and taxes in the ongoing Ottoman–Habsburg wars and neither could afford to estrange the nobles nor to force back spreading Protestantism. In turn the estates, unlike the Bohemian utraquists, remained neutral in the Schmalkaldic War of 1546/47 and even arranged troops in support of Ferdinand's brother Emperor Charles V —against the fierce protest of reformer Johannes Bugenhagen. In contrast, the hesitant Lusatian League was not able to prolong military support up to the decisive Battle of Mühlberg. Furious King Ferdinand ordered the League's representatives to his Bohemian court at Prague, where he sentenced the cities to pay an enormous fine and seized their properties. Moreover, he revoked all the League's privileges, a measure that later could be rescinded in a long and arduous process of negotiations.

Ferdinand's successor Emperor Maximilian II officially implemented the Lutheran Confessio Augustana in 1564. Nevertheless, the Upper Lusatian lands did not remain untouched by the rising conflicts in the course of the Counter-Reformation in the neighbouring lands of Bohemia and Moravia.

=== Saxony ===
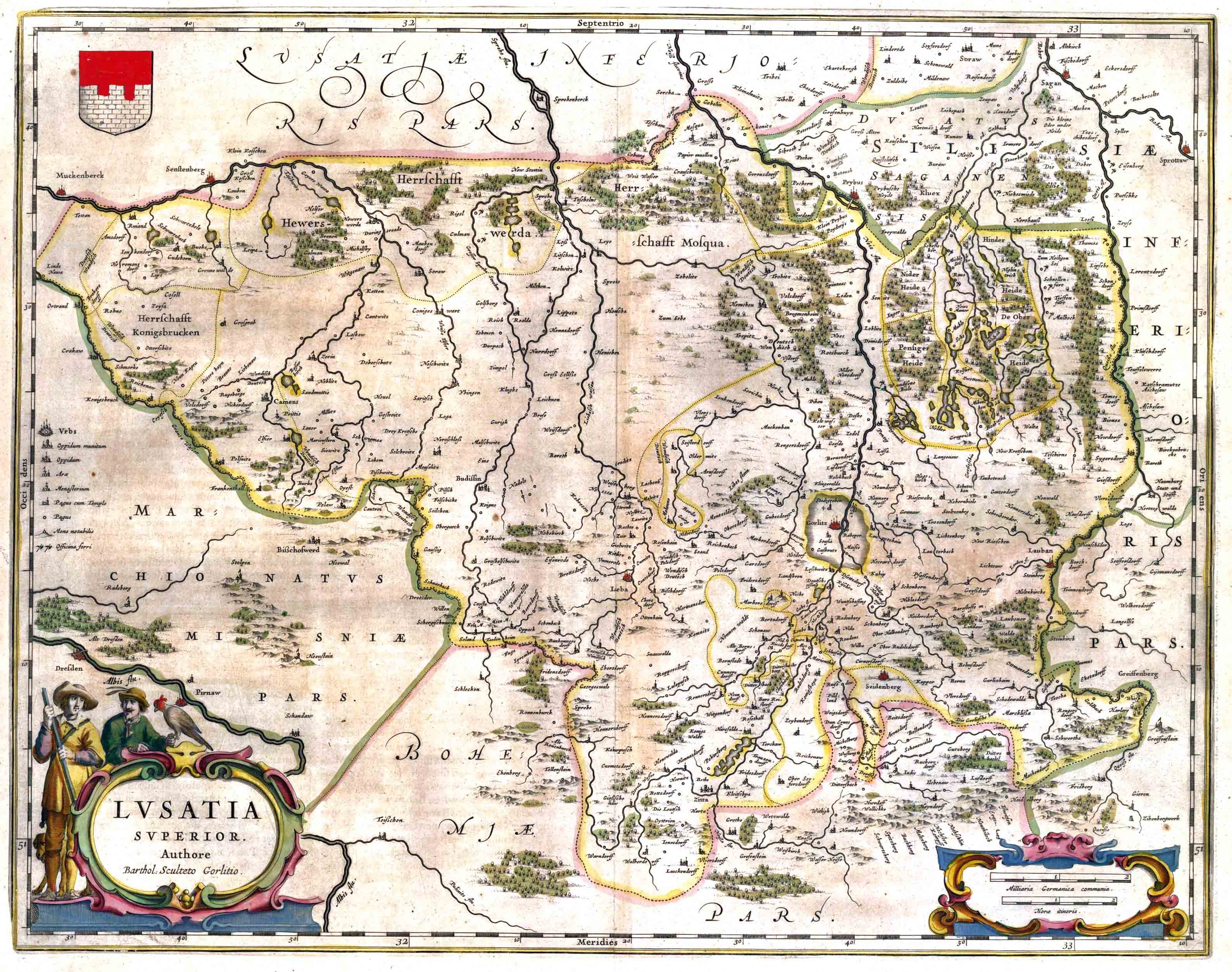
1645 map of Upper Lusatia

The Margraviate of Upper Lusatia was transferred by the Peace of Prague (1635) to the Electorate of Saxony. Two main routes connecting Warsaw and Dresden ran through the region in the 18th century and Kings Augustus II the Strong and Augustus III of Poland often traveled the routes. Numerous Polish dignitaries also traveled through Upper Lusatia on several occasions, and some Polish nobles owned estates in Lusatia. A distinct remnant of the region's ties to Poland are the 18th-century mileposts decorated with the coat of arms of the Polish–Lithuanian Commonwealth located in various towns in the region. Polish-Sorbian contacts increased in that period. With the Age of Enlightenment, the Sorbian national revival began and resistance to Germanization emerged.

During the Napoleonic Wars, in 1813, Polish troops stayed in the region and two Polish military units were established in Zittau, that is the 1st Horse Artillery Company of the Jan Henryk Dąbrowski Division and 2nd Horse Artillery Company of the VIII Corps of Prince Józef Poniatowski.

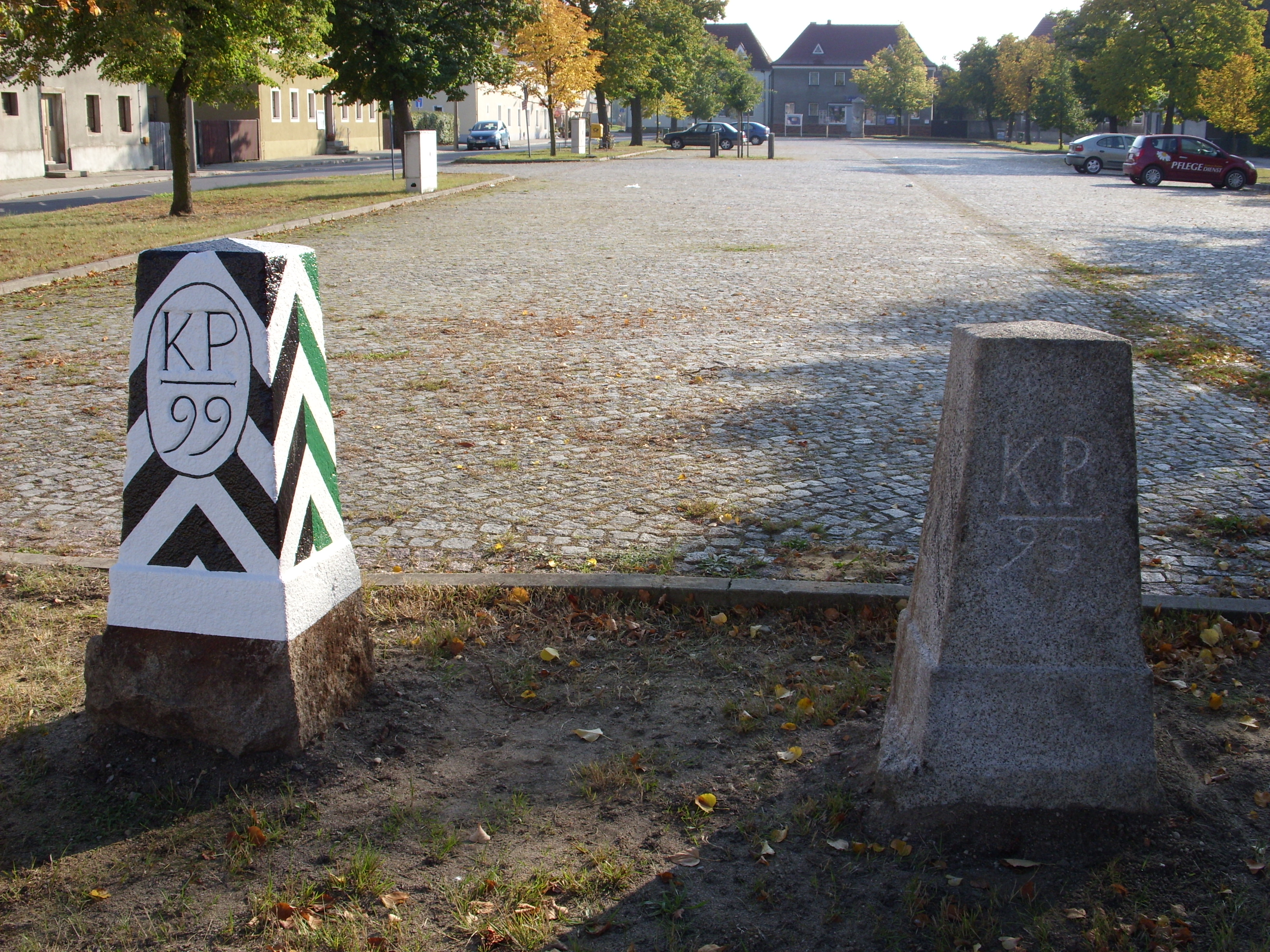
Inner-Lusatian border at Königswartha

According to the Final Act of the 1815 Congress of Vienna, the northeastern part of Upper Lusatia passed from the Kingdom of Saxony to the Kingdom of Prussia. The new demarcation line ran from Ruhland in the northwest to the Bohemian border at Seidenberg (Zawidów) in the southeast. The Upper Lusatian territory north of it, i.e. the districts of Hoyerswerda, Rothenburg, Görlitz and Lauban (Lubań), was attached to the Prussian Province of Silesia.

Though this area had never been affiliated with historic Silesia before, it is still referred to as "Silesian Upper Lusatia" (Schlesische Oberlausitz), e.g. by the local body of the Evangelical Church.

In the 1840s, Polish Romantic poet Roman Zmorski issued the Polish newspaper Stadło in Budissin and co-operated with the Sorbs.

In the interbellum, the German government carried out a massive campaign of changing of place names in Lusatia in order to erase traces of Slavic origin, and while most of the historic names were restored after World War II, some were retained.

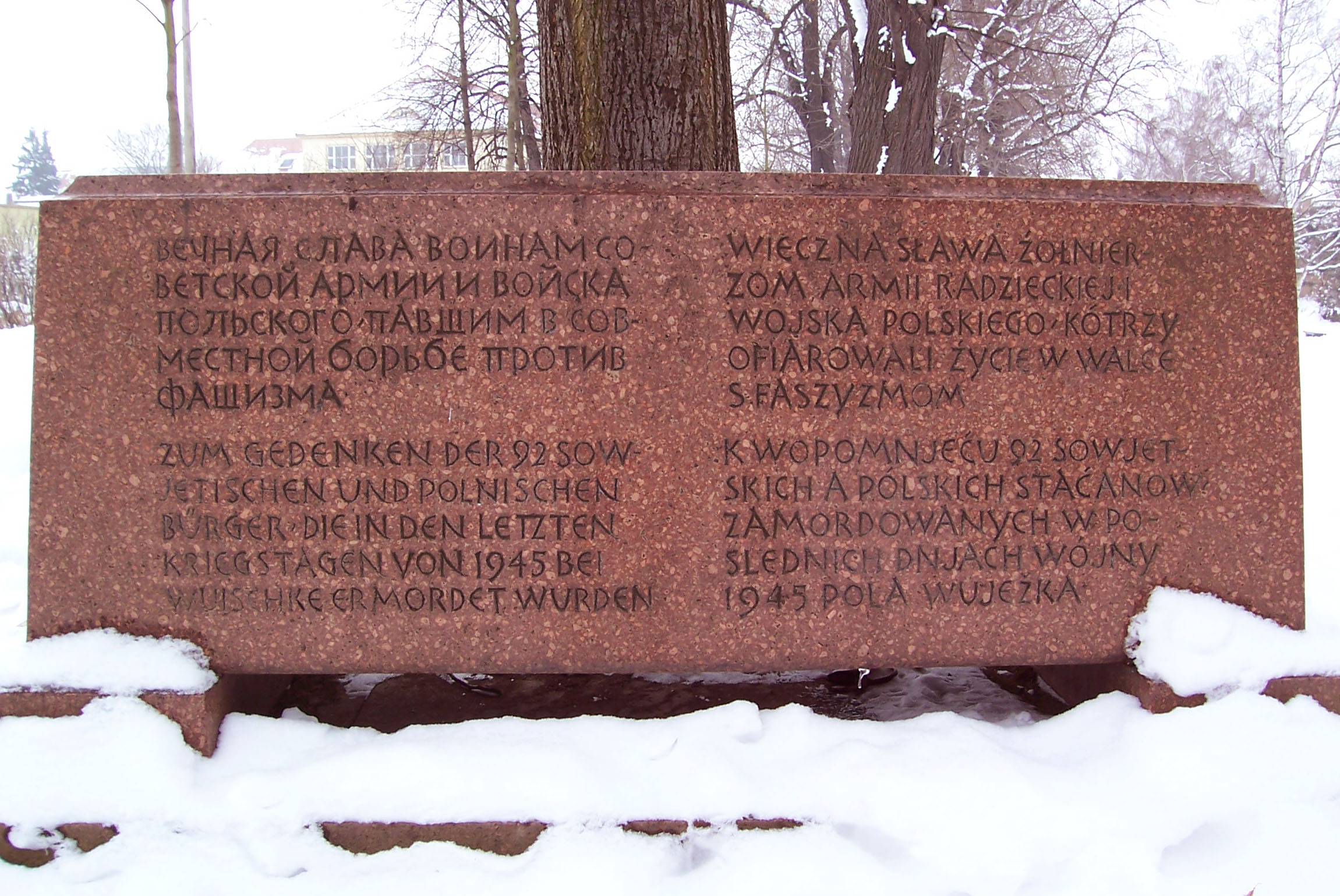
Memorial to Soviet and Polish troops fallen in the Battle of Bautzen (1945)

During World War II, the Germans operated the Stalag IV-A, Stalag VIII-A and Oflag IV-D prisoner-of-war camps for Polish POWs and civilians, and French, Belgian, British, Australian, New Zealander, Canadian, South African, Italian, Serbian, Soviet, Slovak and American POWs with multiple forced labour subcamps in the region. There were also several Nazi prisons with multiple forced labour subcamps, including in Görlitz and Zittau and multiple subcamps of the Gross-Rosen concentration camp, the prisoners of which were mostly Jews, Poles and Russians, but also Frenchmen, Italians, Yugoslavs, Czechs, Belgians, etc.

During the war, the Poles postulated that after the defeat of Germany, the Sorbs should be allowed free national development either within the borders of Poland or Czechoslovakia, or as an independent Sorbian state in alliance with Poland.

The Eastern Front reached Lusatia in early 1945, with Soviet and Polish troops defeating the Germans and capturing the region. In Horka, on 26 April 1945, the Germans carried out a massacre of a field hospital column of the 9th Polish Armored Division, killing some 300 POWs, mostly wounded soldiers and medical personnel (see German atrocities committed against Polish prisoners of war).

=== Post-war ===
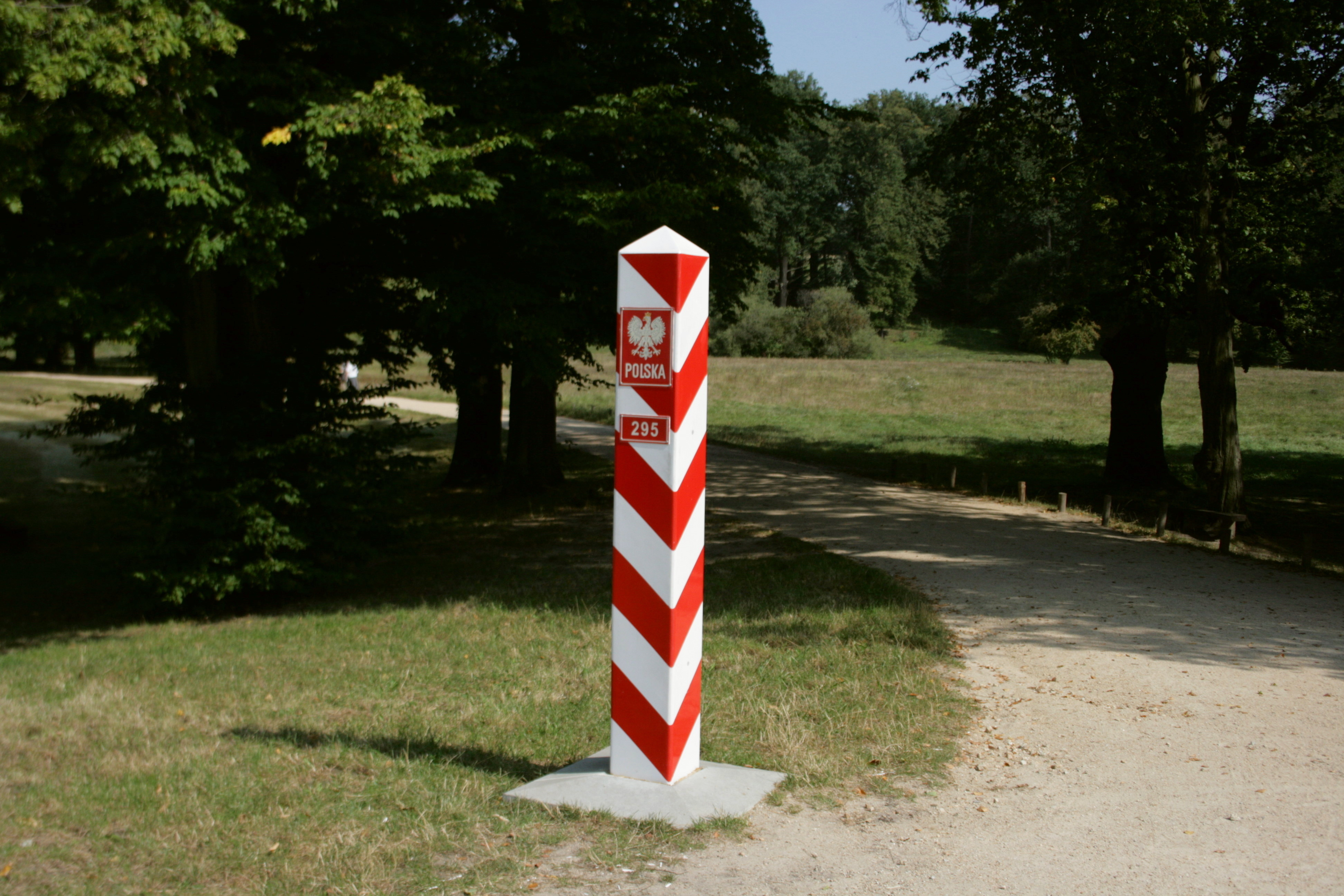
Polish boundary stone in Łęknica

After the end of World War II in 1945, the border between East Germany and Poland was fixed at the Oder–Neisse line. This new border split the historic region of Upper Lusatia between the two countries. From 1949, up to 7,000 Greeks and Macedonians, refugees of the Greek Civil War, settled in Zgorzelec and Lubań, however, many soon relocated to other places in Poland.

== Rulers ==
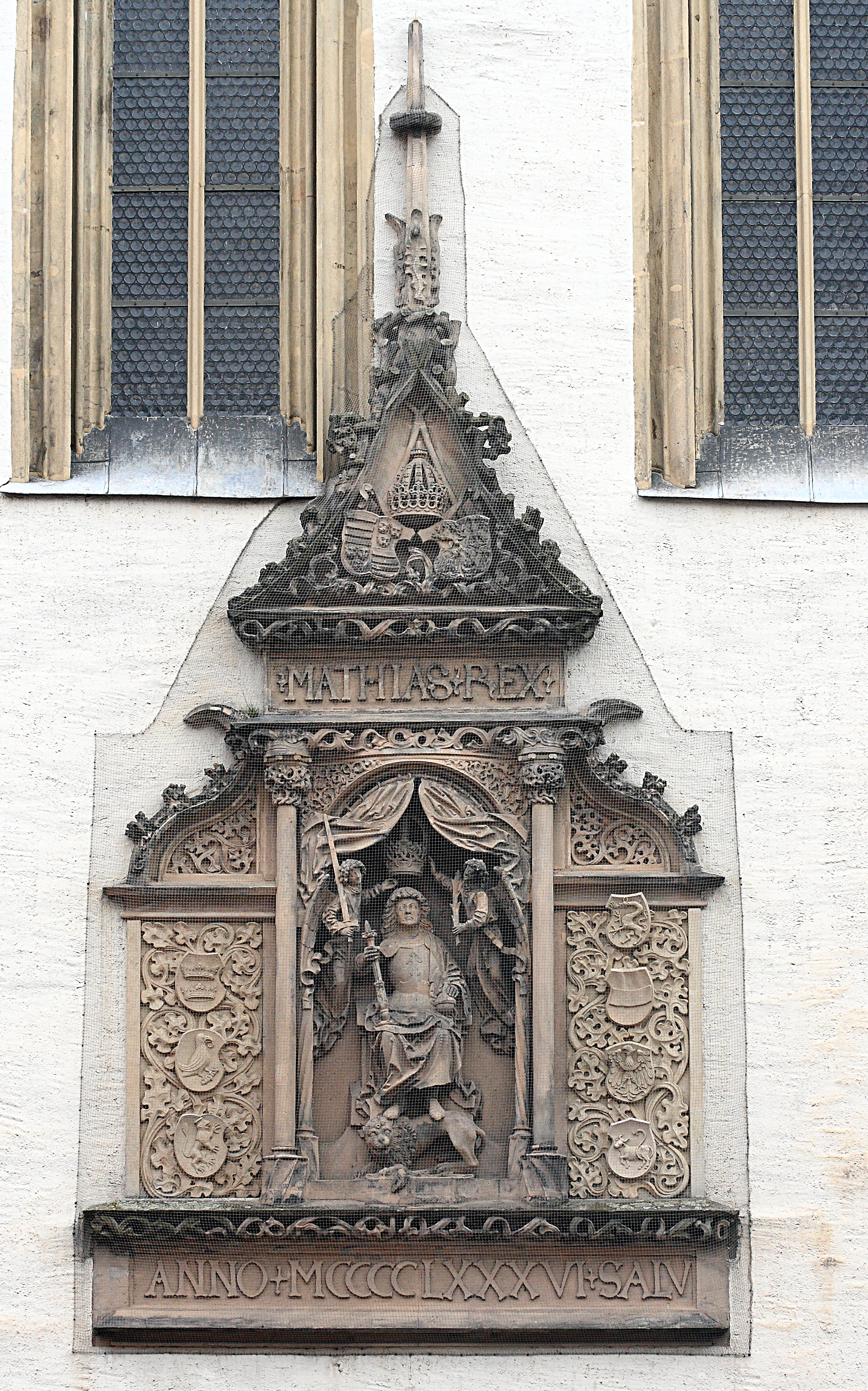
Relief of King Matthias Corvinus of Hungary in Bautzen

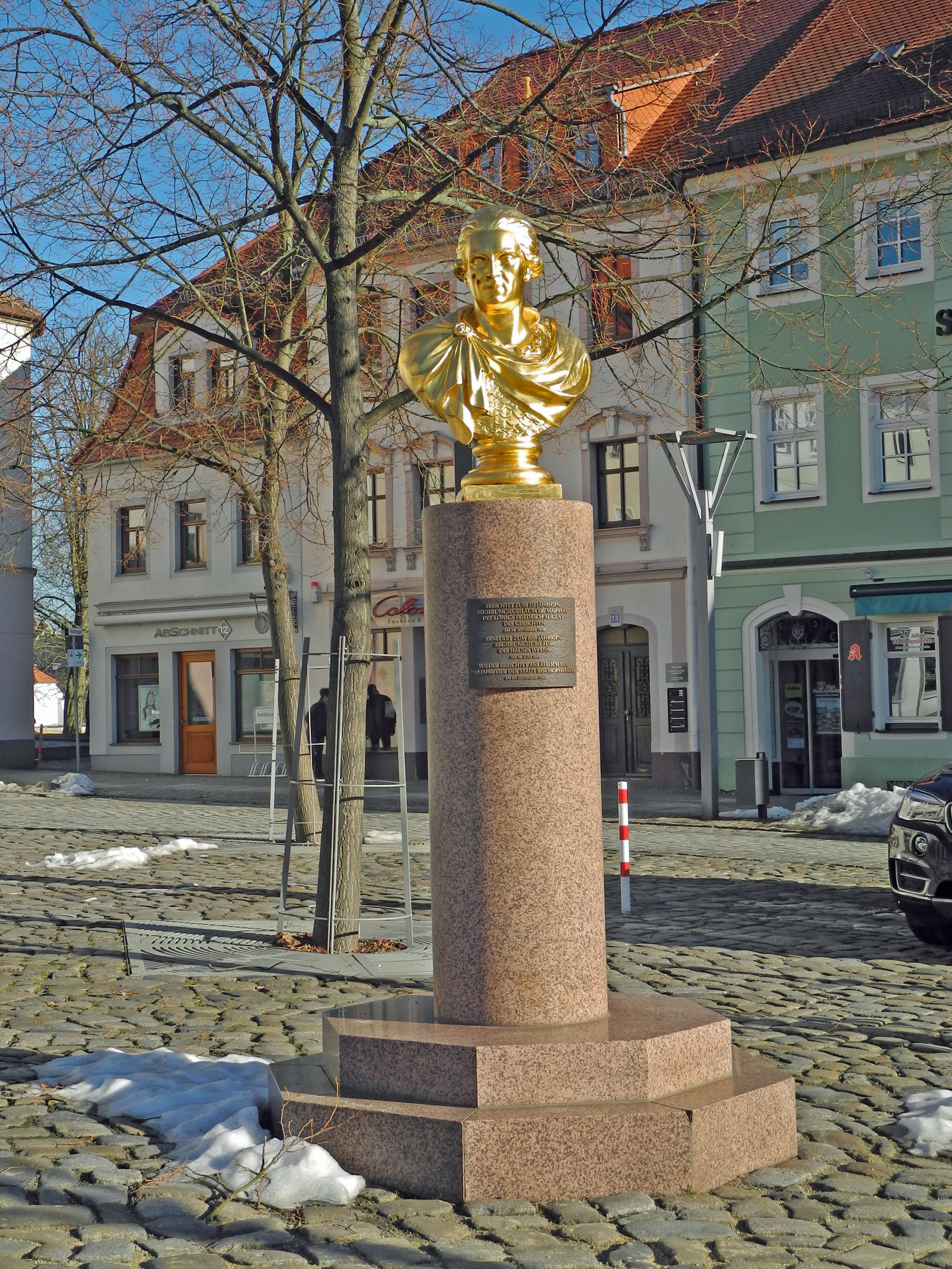
Bust of Frederick Augustus I of Saxony and Warsaw in Bischofswerda

Poděbrady King of Bohemia (1458–1469)
George of Poděbrady	1458–1469

Hunyadi King of Hungary (1469–1490)
Matthias Corvinus	1469–1490

Jagiellonian Kings of Bohemia (1490–1526)
Vladislaus II	1490–1516
Louis	1516–1526

Habsburg Kings of Bohemia (1526–1635)
Ferdinand I, Holy Roman Emperor from 1558	1526–1562
Maximilian II, Holy Roman Emperor from 1564	1562–1576
Rudolf II, Holy Roman Emperor	1576–1611
Matthias, Holy Roman Emperor from 1512	1611–1617
Frederick of the Palatinate (the "Winter King")	1619/20
Ferdinand II, Holy Roman Emperor from 1619	1617–1635

Wettin Electors of Saxony (1635–1815)
John George I	1635–1656
John George II	1656–1680
John George III	1680–1691
John George IV	1691–1694
Frederick Augustus I, "the Strong", King of Poland from 1697	1694–1733
Frederick Augustus II, King of Poland	1733–1763
Frederick Christian	1763
Frederick Augustus III, King of Saxony from 1806, Duke of Warsaw from 1807	1763–1815

== Inhabitants ==
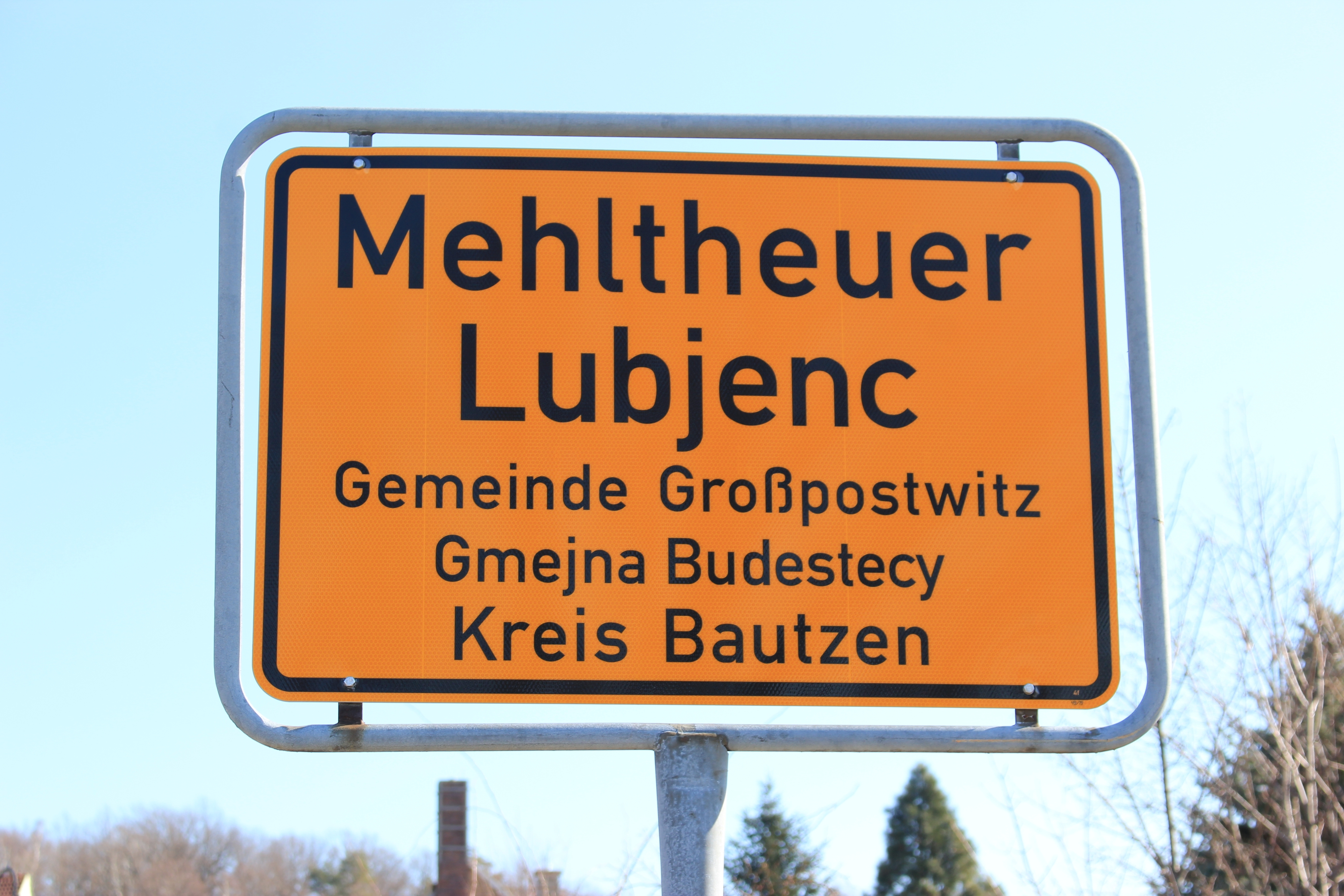
Bilingual sign in Mehltheuer/Lubjenc near Bautzen

Today, approximately 780,000 people live in Upper Lusatia, nearly 157,000 of them in the Polish part to the east of the Neisse river. A part of the country belongs to the settlement area of the Sorbs. Between Kamenz, Bautzen and Hoyerswerda, about 20,000 people speak Sorbian. However, the German population is not culturally homogeneous, and the cultural borders can be quite well identified by the different dialect groups. While in the region around Bautzen a good deal of High German is spoken, in the south the Upper Lusatian dialect of German (Oberlausitzisch), is common. In the east, Silesian is still spoken by some. The greatest density of population can be found in the German-Polish twin city of Görlitz/Zgorzelec. Currently 91,000 inhabitants, 33,000 in the Polish part, live there.

In the German part of Upper Lusatia, the population has been declining since the 1990s. Young people leave the region because the unemployment in Eastern Saxony is particularly high. This and the low birth rate have led to severe aging of the population. In the absence of available jobs, minimal influx of foreigners is noticeable. The Polish part of Upper Lusatia is, apart from Zgorzelec, Lubań and Bogatynia, only sparsely populated and the area belongs to an economically weak region of Poland: only the coal-fired power plant in Turów offers a larger number of industrial jobs.

=== Largest towns ===
- Bautzen
- Bischofswerda
- Bogatynia
- Ebersbach-Neugersdorf
- Görlitz
- Hoyerswerda
- Kamenz
- Löbau
- Lubań
- Weißwasser
- Zgorzelec
- Zittau

== Culture ==
=== Sights ===
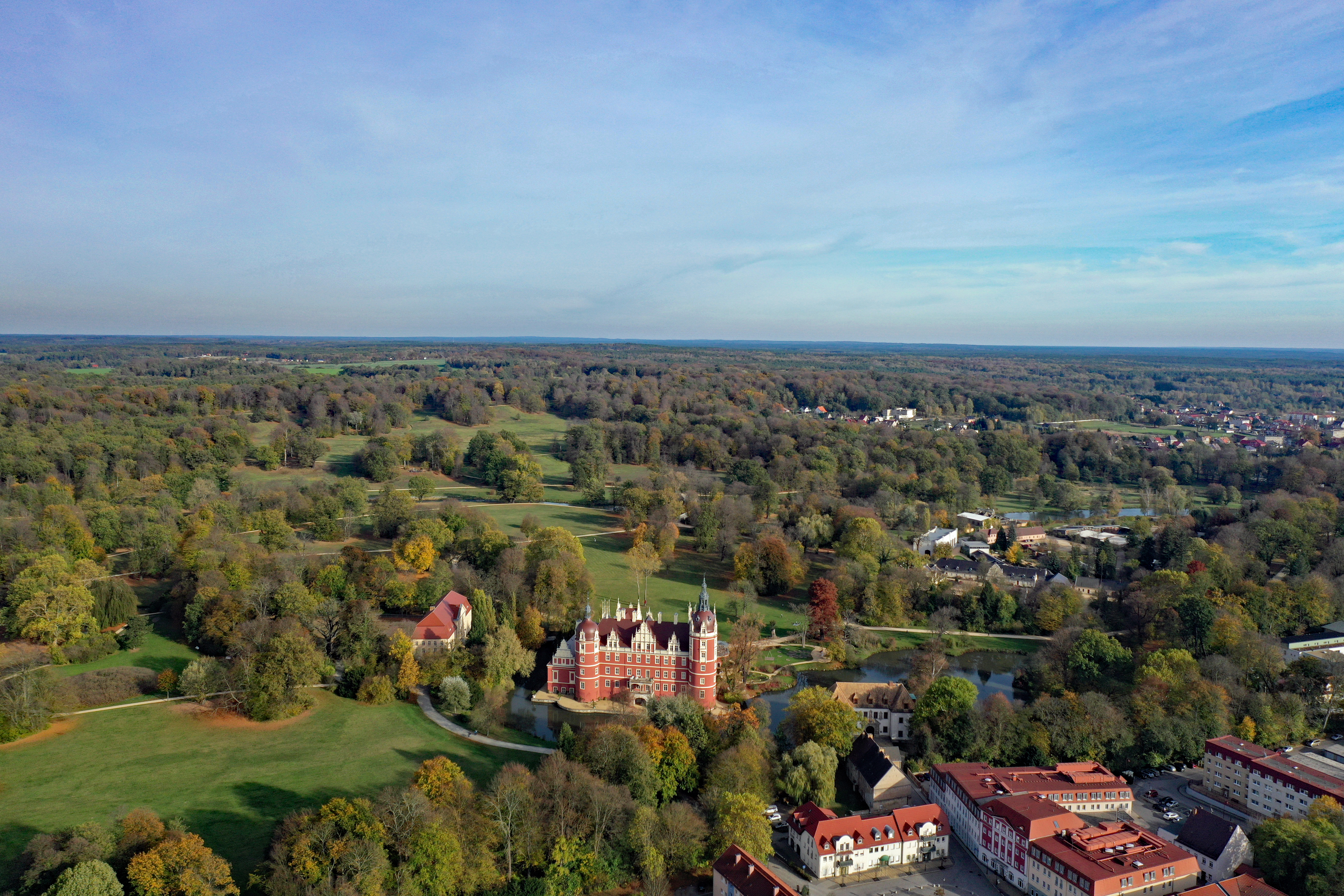
Muskau Park

The region is rich in architecture from various reigns, including Czech, Polish, German and Hungarian, whose styles range from Gothic through Renaissance and Baroque to modern architecture.

The Muskau Park in Bad Muskau (Mužakow) and Łęknica is a World Heritage Site and Historic Monument of Poland.

Poland's oldest tree, the over-1200-year-old Henryków yew (Cis henrykowski) in Henryków Lubański, is located in Upper Lusatia.

Main museums dedicated to the history of the region include the Sorbian museum in Bautzen (Serbski muzej Budyšin) and Muzeum Łużyckie ("Lusatian Museum") in Zgorzelec.

Zgorzelec is home to one of Poland's largest war cemeteries.

== Sports ==
One of the most successful sports teams is Turów Zgorzelec, 2013–14 Polish Basketball Champions and former participant of the EuroLeague and EuroCup Basketball.

== Sources ==
- Bachrach, David S. (2020). "The Eastern Campaigns of King Henry II of Germany, 1003–17". Journal of Medieval Military History. 18: 1–36.
- Bahlcke, Joachim (ed.): Geschichte der Oberlausitz. Herrschaft, Gesellschaft und Kultur vom Mittelalter bis zum Ende des 20. Jahrhunderts. 2. durchgesehene Auflage, Leipziger Universitätsverlag, Leipzig 2004, ISBN 978-3-935693-46-2.
- Blaschke, Karlheinz: Beiträge zur Geschichte der Oberlausitz. Oettel, Görlitz 2000, ISBN 3-932693-59-0.
- Fröde, Tino: Privilegien und Statuten der Oberlausitzer Sechsstädte – Ein Streifzug durch die Organisation des städtischen Lebens in Zittau, Bautzen, Görlitz, Löbau, Kamenz und Lauban in der frühen Neuzeit. Spitzkunnersdorf : Oberlausitzer Verlag, 2008. ISBN 978-3-933827-88-3
- Lorenc, Kito: "Die wendische Schiffahrt (The Wendish Voyage)", Domowina-Verlag 2004. ISBN 3-7420-1988-0
- Nürnberger, Frank (ed.): Oberlausitz. Schöne Heimat. Oberlausitzer Verlag, Spitzkunnersdorf 2004, ISBN 3-933827-42-6.
- Pech, Edmund (2015). "Milzener, Lusizer und Glomaci-Daleminzer: Kontroversen zur frühen Geschichte der Sorben". LĚTOPIS. Zeitschrift für sorbische Sprache, Geschichte und Kultur: Časopis za rěč, stawizny a kulturu Łužiskich Serbow. 62 (2): 119–132.
- Stieldorf, Andrea (2026) [2012]. Marken und Markgrafen: Studien zur Grenzsicherung durch die fränkisch-deutschen Herrscher (2nd ed.). Wiesbaden: Harrassowitz Verlag.
- Trillmich, Werner, ed. (1957). Thietmar von Merseburg: Chronik. Darmstadt: Wissenschaftliche Buchgesellschaf.
- Warner, David A., ed. (2001). Ottonian Germany: The Chronicon of Thietmar of Merseburg. Manchester and New York: Manchester University Press.
