= Sohland =

Sohland is the name of two municipalities in Saxony:

- Sohland am Rotstein, Niederschlesischer Oberlausitzkreis
- Sohland an der Spree, Landkreis Bautzen
