= Löbauer Berg =

Löbauer Berg / Upper Sorbian: Lubijska hora
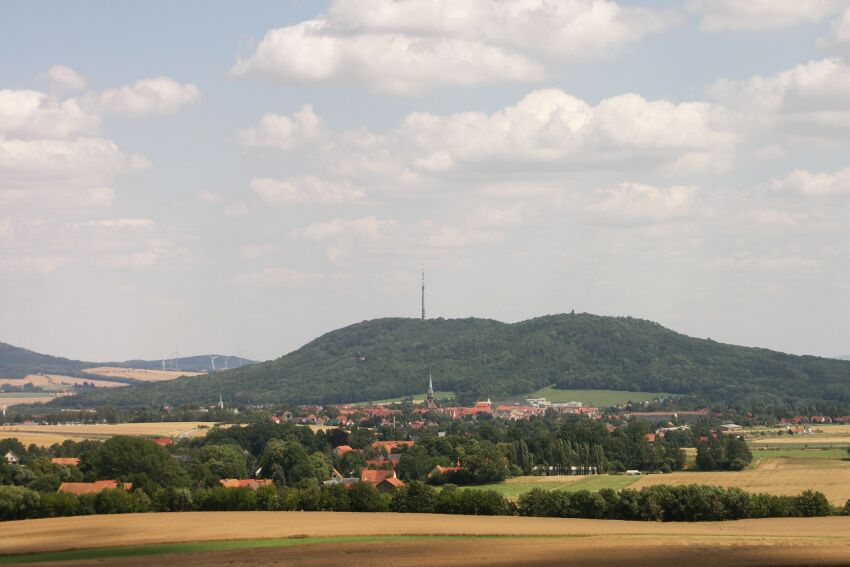
- Schafberg (left) and Löbauer Berg (right), seen from Bubenik. The town of Löbau is in the foreground.

Highest point
- Elevation: 447.9 m above sea level (NHN) (1,469 ft)
- Isolation: 0.6 km → Schafberg (Löbau)
- Listing: – King Frederick Augustus Tower (observation tower) – Double summit with the Schafberg
- Coordinates: 51°05′27″N 14°41′33″E

Geography
- Location within Saxony
- Location: near Löbau, Görlitz county, Saxony (Germany)
- Parent range: Lusatian Highlands

Geology
- Mountain type: volcanic pipe
- Rock type: Basalt (Nephelin dolerite)

The Löbauer Berg (Upper Sorbian: Lubijska hora, pronounced [ˈlubʲijska ˈhɔʁa]) is an extinct volcano and, with a height of 447.9 m above sea level (NHN), the Hausberg or local hill of the eponymous town of Löbau in the county of Görlitz in southeastern Saxony. It is covered in mixed mountain woodland consisting of common oak, hornbeam and small-leave lime.
