= King Frederick Augustus Tower =

Coordinates: 51°05′28″N 14°41′34″E

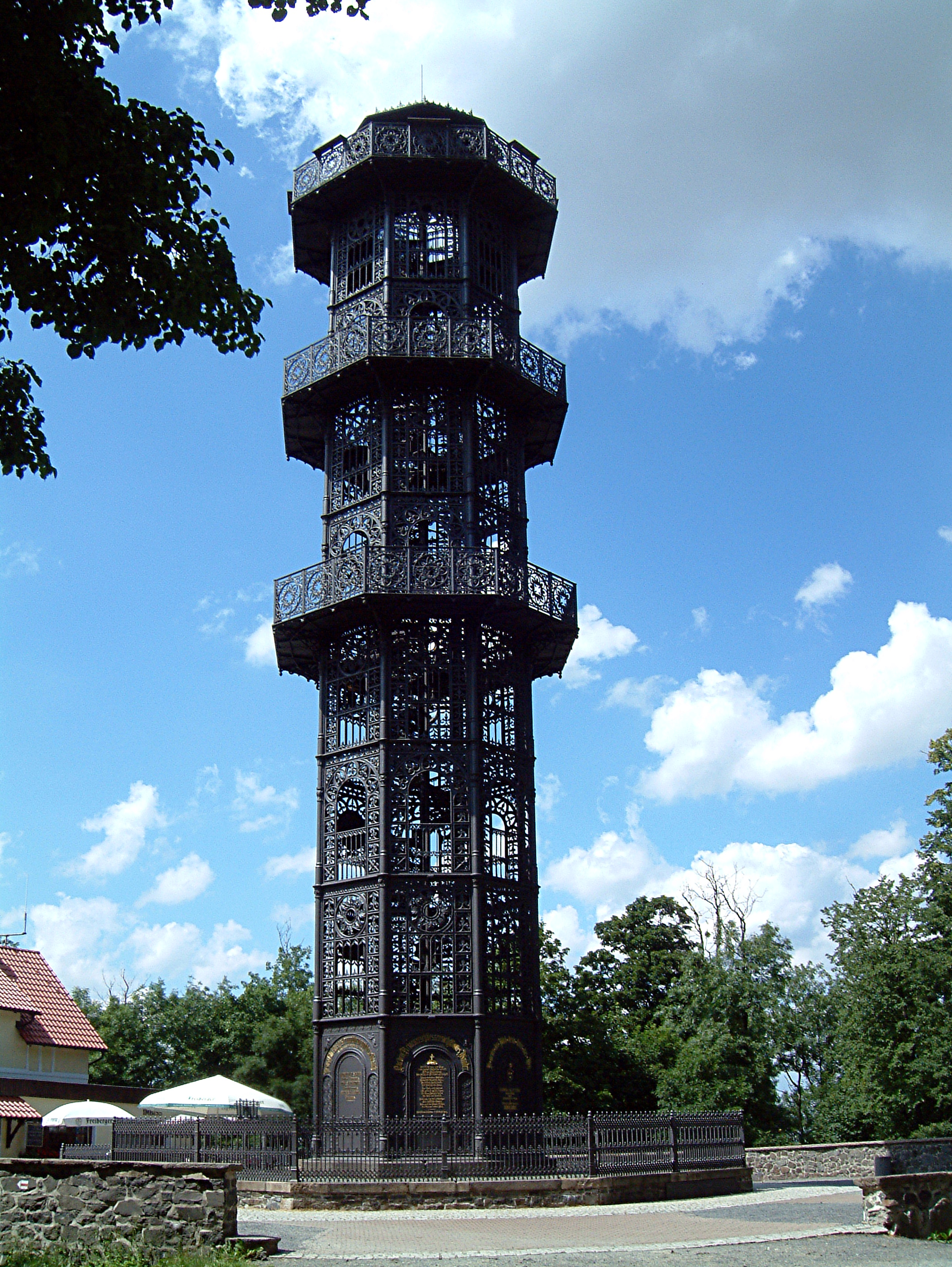
King Frederick Augustus Tower

The King Frederick Augustus Tower (German: König-Friedrich-August-Turm) is the only preserved observation tower of cast iron in Europe and perhaps the oldest tower built of iron. It is located on the Löbauer Berg at Löbau in Saxony, offering a panoramic view of the Zittau Hills and the Upper Lusatia region. The tower was built in 1854 by the Löbau citizens and named after King Frederick Augustus II of Saxony.

At a total height of 28 meters (92 ft), the tower has three observation galleries at 12, 18 and 24 metres above ground. It was designed by Friedrich August Bretschneider jr. after The Crystal Palace in Hyde Park, London, with its erection costing 25.000 Taler. Construction works started on May 18, 1854 after preparation of ground had started on January 12. On September 9 it was inaugurated, shortly after King Frederick had died on vacation in Tyrol. In 1993, it was dismantled and its parts were thoroughly restored, with the original structure being rebuilt the following year.

== See also ==
- Cast-iron architecture
- List of towers
