= Sohland am Rotstein =

- Ortsteil of Reichenbach
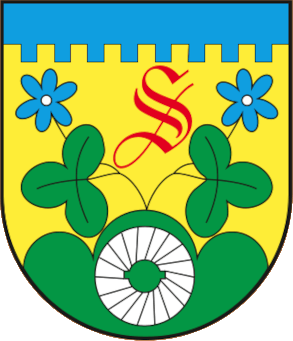
- Coat of arms
- Interactive map of Sohland am Rotstein
- Location within Germany Location within Saxony
- Coordinates: 51°7′N 14°47′E
- Country: Germany
- State: Saxony
- District: Görlitz
- Town: Reichenbach

Area
  - Total: 19.8 km^{2} (7.6 sq mi)
- Elevation: 268 m (879 ft)

Population (2012-12-31)
  - Total: 1,312
  - Density: 66.3/km^{2} (172/sq mi)
- Time zone: UTC+01:00 (CET)
  - Summer (DST): UTC+02:00 (CEST)
- Postal codes: 02894
- Dialling codes: 035828
- Vehicle registration: GR
- Website: www.sohland-rotstein.de

Sohland am Rotstein (German pronunciation: [ˈzoːlant ʔam ˈʁoːtˌʃtaɪn], lit. 'Sohland on the Rotstein'; Upper Sorbian: Załom pod Hrodźišćom, pronounced [ˈzawɔm ˈpɔt hʁɔdʒiʃtʃɔm]) is a village and a former municipality in the district Görlitz, Saxony, Germany. Since 1 January 2014, it is part of the town Reichenbach.
