= Rotstein =

Mountain in Germany

Coordinates: 51°06′N 14°46′E

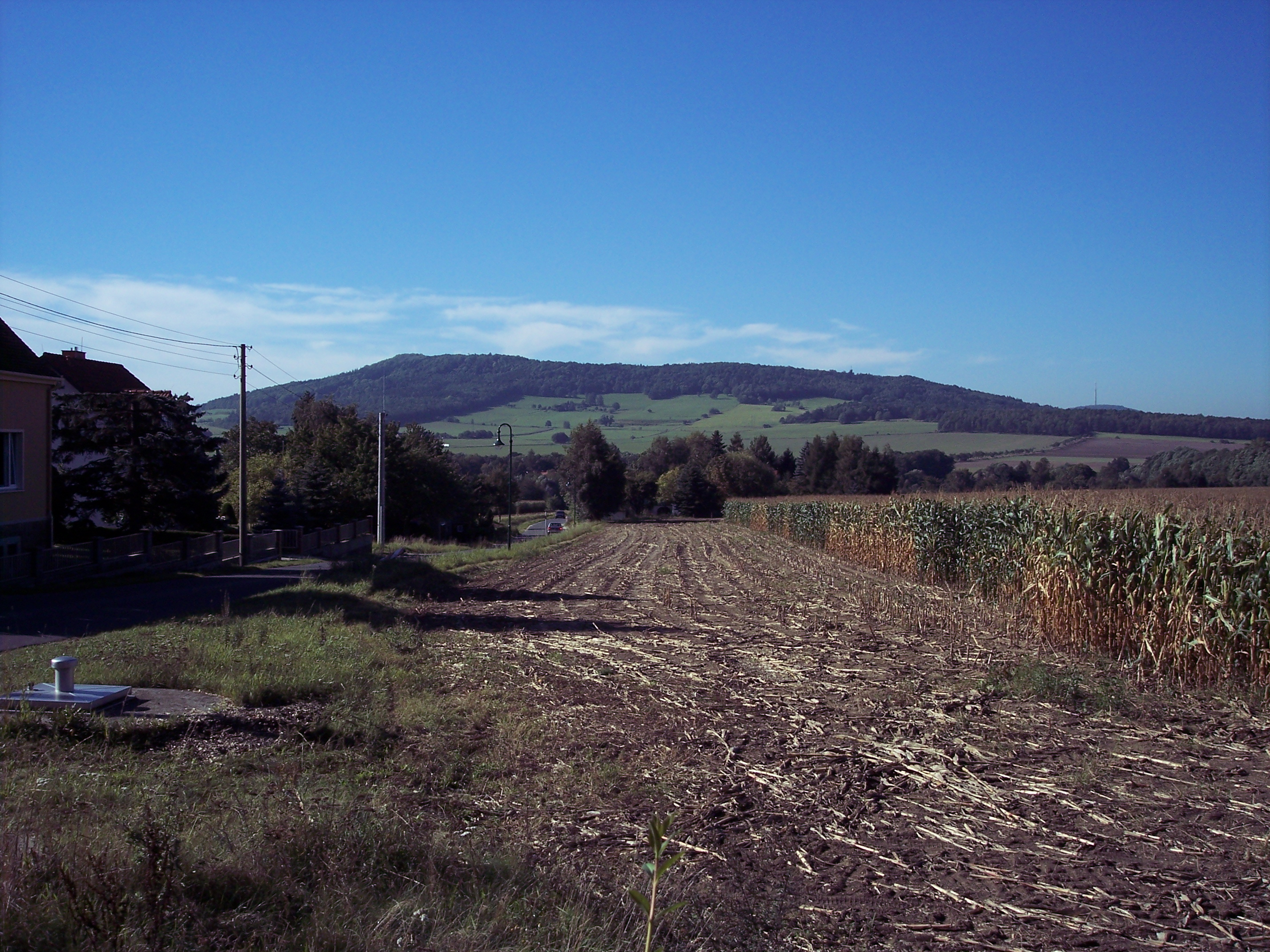
- View of Rotstein from Sohland

Highest point
- Elevation: 454.8 m (1,492 ft)

Geography
- Location: Rosenbach
- Country: Germany
- State: Saxony

Rotstein (German pronunciation: [ˈʁoːtˌʃtaɪn]) is a mountain ridge and its highest mountain in Görlitz district, Saxony, southeastern Germany. Furthermore, it is the highest mountain of the German part of the Zittau Basin. Within the natural regions of Saxony, the Rotstein Ridge forms its own microgeochore within the mesogeochore "Reichenbacher Lösshügelland" (11012) and the macrogeochore Östliche Oberlausitz (11). The peak and the western slopes are located in the territory of Rosenbach, and the eastern slopes lies in Sohland am Rotstein.

There are remains of a late Slavic-early German fortification built as a double wall on the southeastern crest of the Rotstein, hence its Upper Sorbian name Hrodźišćo (lit. 'gord' or 'sconce').
