= Löbau =

- Town
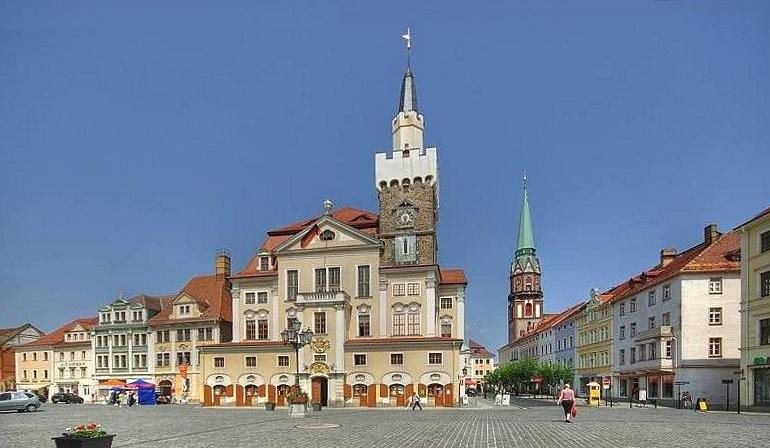
- Market Square with town hall

- Coat of arms

- Location of Löbau within Görlitz district
- Interactive map of Löbau
- Location within Germany Location within Saxony
- Coordinates: 51°05′40″N 14°40′0″E
- Country: Germany
- State: Saxony
- District: Görlitz

Government
  - Mayor (2021–28): Albrecht Gubsch

Area
  - Total: 78.9 km^{2} (30.5 sq mi)
- Elevation: 260 m (850 ft)

Population (2025-12-31)
  - Total: 14,469
  - Density: 183/km^{2} (475/sq mi)
- Time zone: UTC+01:00 (CET)
  - Summer (DST): UTC+02:00 (CEST)
- Postal codes: 02708
- Dialling codes: 03585
- Vehicle registration: GR, LÖB, NOL, NY, WSW, ZI
- Website: loebau.de

Löbau (German pronunciation: [ˈløːbaʊ]; Upper Sorbian: Lubij, pronounced [ˈlubʲij]) is a city in the east of Saxony, Germany, in the historical region of Upper Lusatia. It is situated between the slopes of the Löbauer Berg and the fertile hilly area of the Upper Lusatian Mountains. It is the gateway to this volcanic mountainous area and is situated halfway between the cities of Bautzen, Görlitz and Zittau.

== History ==
Löbau was first mentioned in 1221 as "Oppidum Lubaw". From 1319, the city was part of the Bohemian (Czech) Crown. In 1346 the city was a founding member of the Lusatian League, consisting of the six cities Bautzen, Görlitz, Kamenz, Lubań, Löbau and Zittau, which was disbanded in 1815. In 1469, along with the Lusatian League, the town recognized the rule of King Matthias Corvinus and passed to Hungary, and in 1490 it returned to the Czech Crown, then under the rule of Polish Prince Vladislaus II. From 1635, it was ruled by the Electors of Saxony, from 1697 also Kings of Poland, and from 1871 it was part of the German Empire. After Germany's defeat in World War II, the town was part of East Germany until 1990. The league was revived in 1991, though it no longer holds political power and mostly acts as a tourism promotion board.

The town is widely known for the piano manufacturing company August Förster.

== Main sights ==
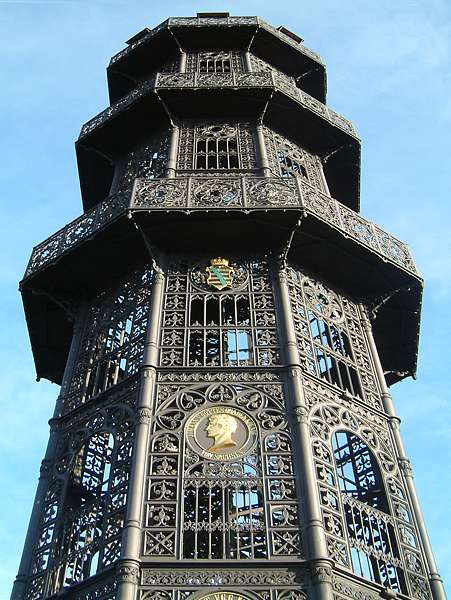
King Frederick Augustus Tower

The town hall of the city is a noteworthy mixture of several architectural styles. Another famous building is the Schminke House by German architect Hans Scharoun, one of the most important exponents of organic and expressionist architecture. The building dates from the 1930s, anticipating the architecture of the 1950s. It is regarded as one of Scharoun's greatest works.

The King Frederick Augustus Tower is Löbau's main landmark; the tower made of cast iron was built in 1854 on the Löbauer Berg, and is 28 m tall. It is the biggest cast-iron tower in Europe and offers magnificent views of the Lusatian Highlands.

== Politics ==
=== Reichstag Deputies ===
Following the North German Confederation Treaty the Kingdom of Saxony entered the North German Confederation in 1866. This continued after the founding of the German Empire on 18 January 1871. Following this Saxony participated in Reichstag elections from February 1867. Löbau returned a series of Reichstag Deputies until 1919 when the existing constituencies were scrapped.

== International relations ==
=== Twin towns — Sister cities ===
Löbau is twinned with:

- Makó, Hungary
- Ettlingen, Germany
- Lubań, Poland

== People ==
- August Förster (1829-1897), piano maker
- Marie Wackwitz (1865-1930), women's rights activist
- Georg Scholze (1897-1945), general during World War II
- Konrad Kujau (1938-2000), forger
- Bernd Böhlich (*1957), director
- Uwe Proske (*1961), Olympic gold medalist (1992, fencing)
- Anne-Kathrin Schade (*1968), volleyball player
- Jana Henke (*1973), swimmer
- Mirko Müller (*1974), pair skater
- René Münnich (*1977), auto racing driver and team owner
- Robert Koch (*1986), footballer (formerly Dynamo Dresden, 1. FC Nürnberg)
- Christian Reitz (*1987), Olympic gold medalist (2016, 25 metre rapid fire pistol) and world record holder
