= Cunnersdorfer Wasser =

River in Germany

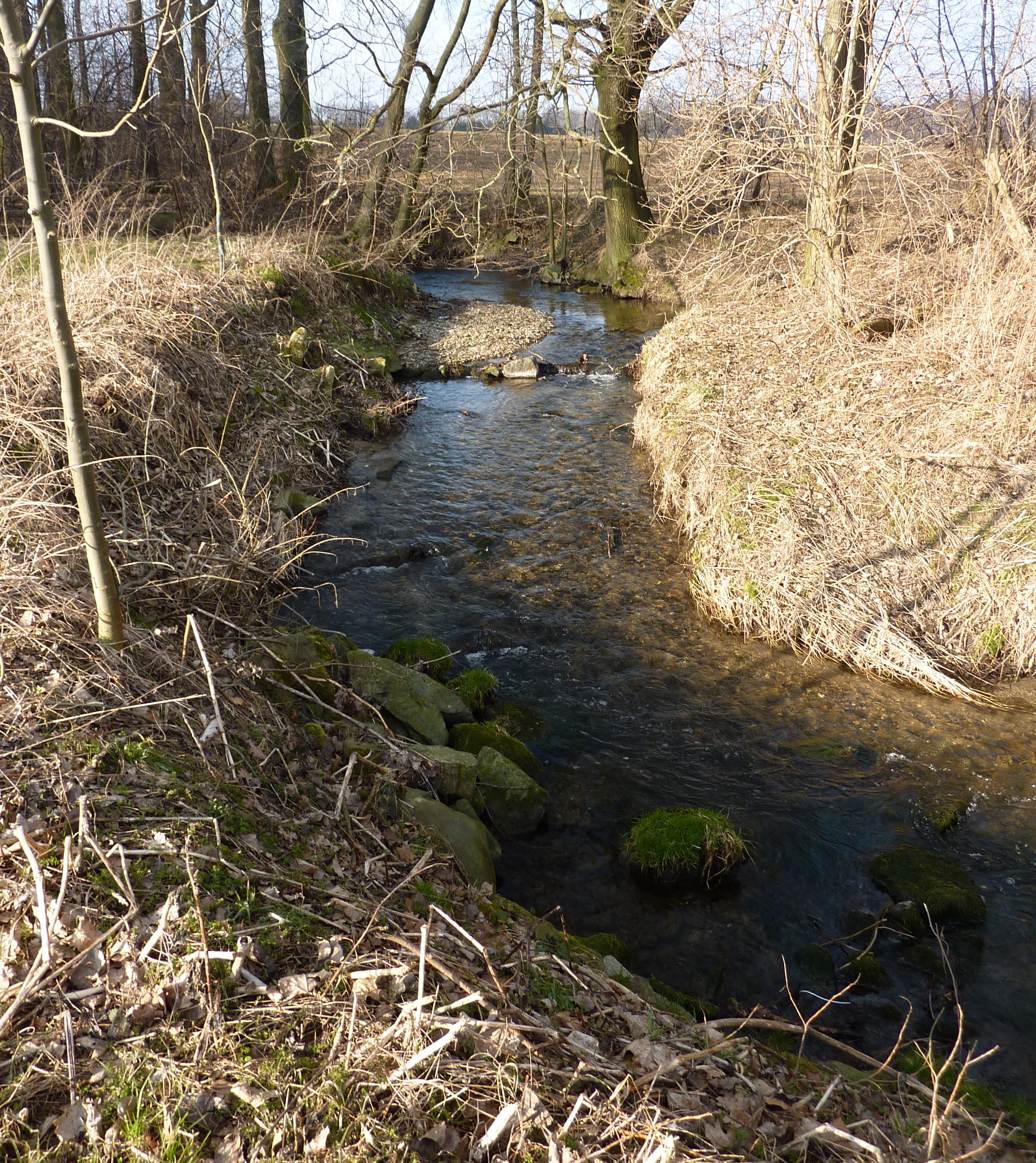

Location
- Country: Germany
- State: Saxony

Physical characteristics
- Mouth
  - location: Löbauer Wasser
  - coordinates: 51.0759°N 14.6675°E

Basin features
- Progression: Löbauer Wasser→ Spree→ Havel→ Elbe→ North Sea

Cunnersdorfer Wasser is a river of Saxony, Germany. Its source is at the foot of the Kottmar mountain. It is a right tributary of the Löbauer Wasser, which it joins near Löbau. It flows through Obercunnersdorf and Niedercunnersdorf.

== See also ==
- List of rivers of Saxony
