= Zittau–Löbau railway =

Railway line in Saxony, Germany

Zittau–Löbau (Sachs) railway

Overview
- Line number: 6214
- Locale: Saxony, Germany

Service
- Route number: 231, 235

Technical
- Line length: 33.95 km (21.10 mi)
- Number of tracks: 2: Oberoderwitz–Zittau
- Track gauge: 1,435 mm (4 ft 8 1/2 in) standard gauge
- Minimum radius: 400 m (1,312 ft)
- Operating speed: 100 km/h (62.1 mph) (maximum)
- Maximum incline: 0.11%

The Zittau–Löbau railway is a line in the German state of Saxony, originally built and operated by the Löbau-Zittau Railway Company. The line opened in 1848 and it was one of the oldest lines in Germany. Only part of the line is still in service. It starts at Zittau and originally ran via Oderwitz and Herrnhut to Löbau.

== History ==
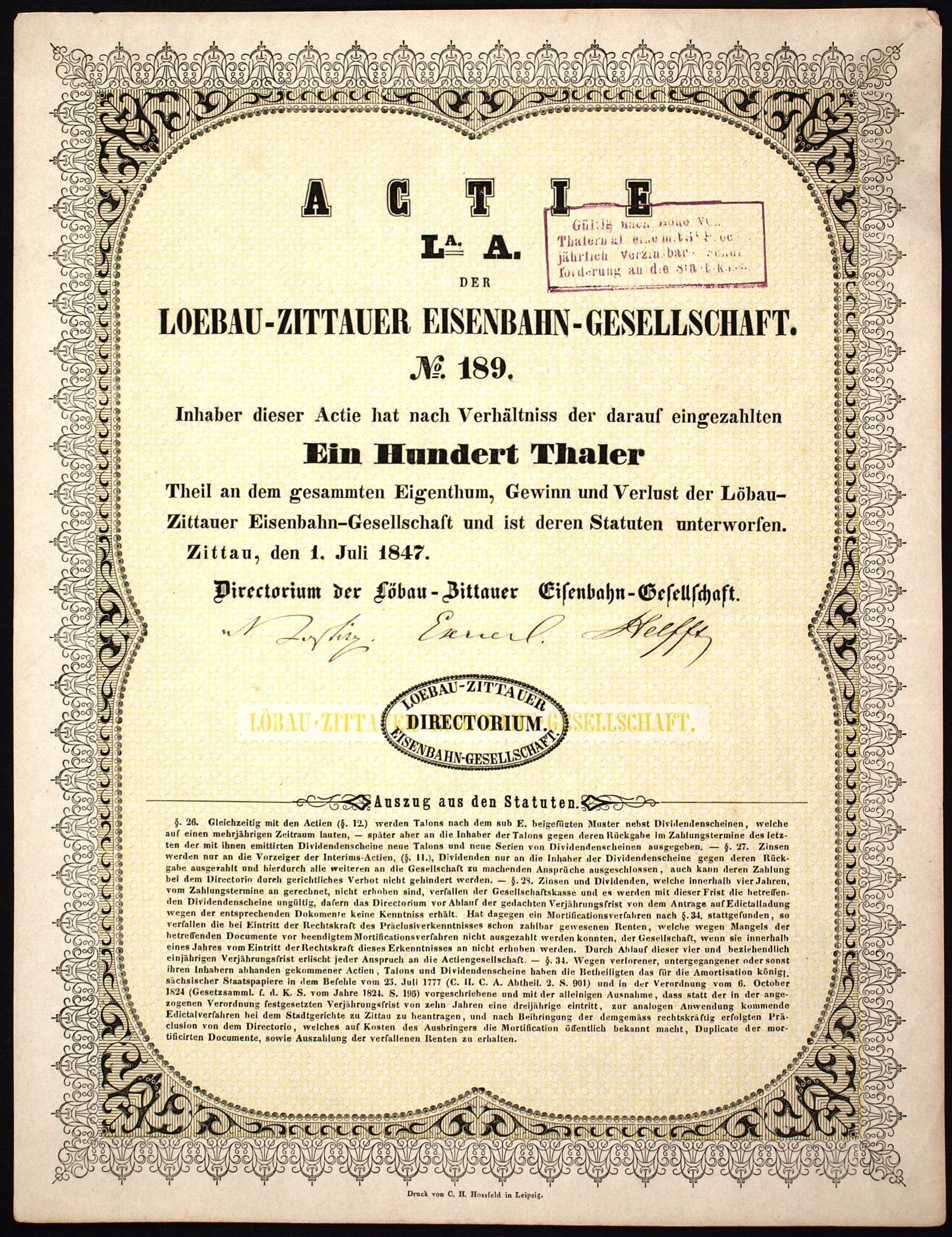
Share of the Loebau-Zittauer Eisenbahn-Gesellschaft, issued 1. July 1847

The Löbau-Zittau Railway Company (German: Löbau-Zittauer Eisenbahn-Gesellschaft) received a concession on 25 June 1845 to build a line from Löbau to Zittau. The line was opened on 10 June 1848. The line was initially also operated by the Löbau-Zittau Railway.

On 1 January 1871 the line was acquired by the Royal Saxon State Railways.

At the end of May 1998, passenger services were abandoned between Zittau and Löbau via Herrnhut. As a result, the Oberoderwitz–Herrnhut section lost virtually all of its traffic because local freight traffic ran only from Herrnhut to Löbau. Then, on 31 May 1999, the Oberoderwitz–Herrnhut section closed. Until the end of 2001, freight trains still served Obercunnersdorf (scrap trade) and Herrnhut (coal and timber). Afterwards only Niedercunnersdorf (gas, agricultural traffic) was served. At the end of February 2002, an application was made to close the Herrnhut–Niedercunnersdorf section, but final closure only occurred on 28 February 2003. At the December 2002 timetable change, passenger services between Ebersbach and Löbau were finally abandoned. Thus there are no any regular passenger services on the northern section of the Zittau–Löbau line. The remaining section from Zittau to Oberoderwitz connects with the Oberoderwitz–Wilthen line and is served by passenger services between Zittau and Dresden.

Since 2007 the Oberoderwitz–Löbau section has been leased to Deutsche Regionaleisenbahn (DRE).

== Route ==
The line leaves Löbau station through a cutting to the south. Beyond Großschweidnitz station is the first deep cutting on the line, which then crosses the valley of the Großschweidnitzer Wasser on a seven span viaduct. Immediately after the viaduct, the line to Ebersbach turns off to the south, while the Löbau–Zittau line turns to the southeast towards Herrnhut and Zittau. After Niedercunnersdorf station the line runs parallel with Niedercunnersdorf village. Just before Obercunnersdorf station the line crosses Obercunnersdorf viaduct. After Herrnhut station the line turns south again and runs over a viaduct over the Petersbach. The next viaduct follows in the village of Ruppersdorf, just before the station. Further on, within sight of Kottmar mountain, the line reaches the Landwasser valley and the town of Oderwitz. First another viaduct is crossed before the line reaches Oberoderwitz station. The route now follows the Landwasser valley to the southeast. In Mittelherwigsdorf it crosses the Mandau and then reaches the village’s station. The line then follows that Mandau valley to Zittau.
