= Litte =

River in Germany

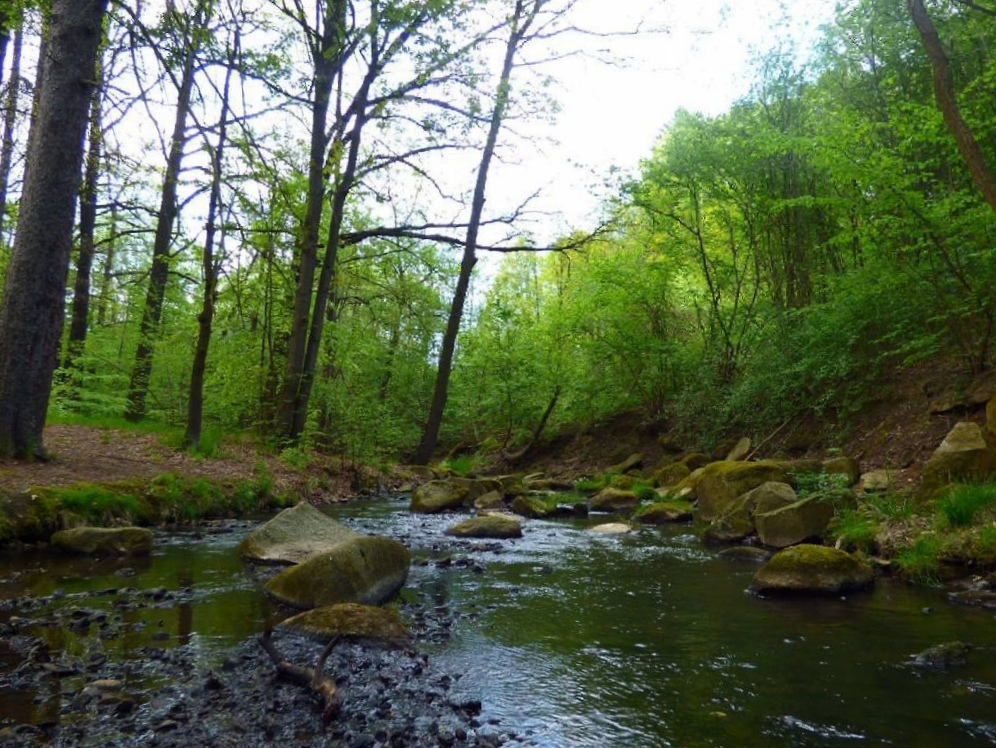

Location
- Country: Germany
- States: Saxony

Physical characteristics
- Mouth
  - location: Großschweidnitzer Wasser
  - coordinates: 51.0708°N 14.6432°E

Basin features
- Progression: Großschweidnitzer Wasser→ Löbauer Wasser→ Spree→ Havel→ Elbe→ North Sea

The Litte is a river of Saxony, Germany. It is a left tributary of the Großschweidnitzer Wasser, which it joins in Großschweidnitz.

Several streams flow into the Litte, which flow exclusively from the west. Coming from Streitfeld, the Streitfelder Wasser flows, from Lawalde the Laubaer Wasser, which is sometimes also called Alte Litte. The last significant tributary is the Sandwasser, sometimes referred to as the Neißwasser, which flows in from the west.

== See also ==
- List of rivers of Saxony
