= Kottmar (municipality) =

- Municipality
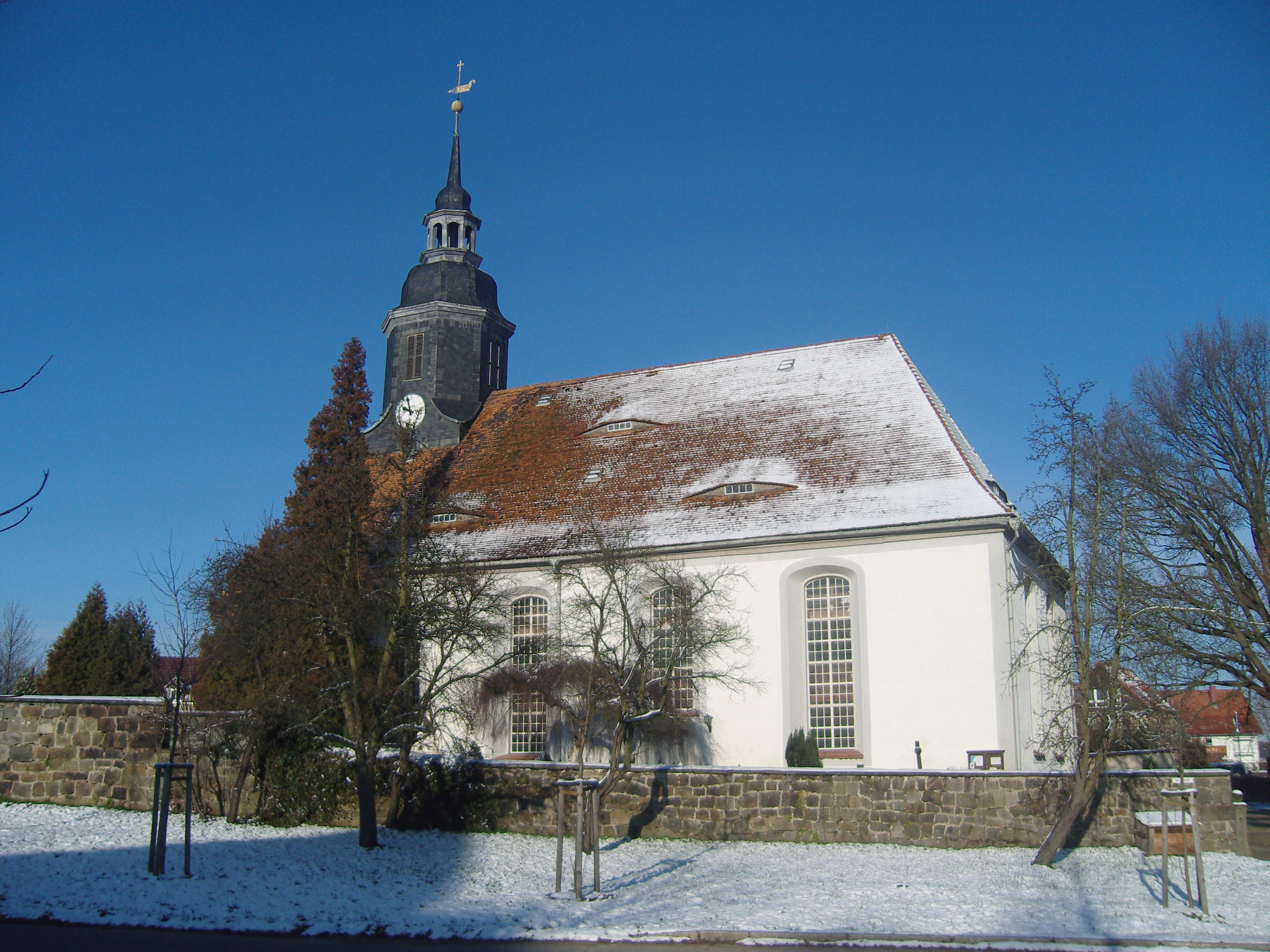
- Church in Niedercunnersdorf

- Coat of arms

- Location of Kottmar within Görlitz district
- Interactive map of Kottmar
- Location within Germany Location within Saxony
- Coordinates: 51°1′N 14°39′E
- Country: Germany
- State: Saxony
- District: Görlitz

Government
  - Mayor (2020–27): Michael Görke

Area
  - Total: 47.34 km^{2} (18.28 sq mi)
- Elevation: 368 m (1,207 ft)

Population (2025-12-31)
  - Total: 6,855
  - Density: 144.8/km^{2} (375.0/sq mi)
- Time zone: UTC+01:00 (CET)
  - Summer (DST): UTC+02:00 (CEST)
- Postal codes: 02708, 02739
- Dialling codes: 03585, 03586, 035875
- Vehicle registration: GR, LÖB, NOL, NY, WSW, ZI
- Website: www.gemeinde-kottmar.de

Kottmar (German pronunciation: [ˈkɔtmaʁ]; Upper Sorbian: Kotmar, pronounced [ˈkɔtmaʁ]) is a municipality in the district of Görlitz, in Saxony, Germany, created with effect from 1 January 2013 by the merger of the municipalities of Eibau, Niedercunnersdorf and Obercunnersdorf. Its name derives from the Kottmar mountain (583 m).
