= Apelt =

Apelt is a surname. Notable people with the surname include:

- Arthur Apelt (1907–1993), German conductor
- Ernst Friedrich Apelt (1812–1859), German philosopher and entrepreneur
- Friedel Apelt (1902–2001), German political activist, trades union official and politician
- Matthäus Apelt (1594–1648), German psalmist, musician and statesman

== See also ==
- Appelt
