= Ninive =

Ninive may refer to:

- Nineveh, an ancient Assyrian city in Iraq
- Ninive, a village in Herrnhut municipality, Germany
