= Eibau =

- Ortsteil of Kottmar
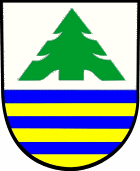
- Coat of arms
- Interactive map of Eibau
- Location within Germany Location within Saxony
- Coordinates: 50°58′53″N 14°39′33″E
- Country: Germany
- State: Saxony
- District: Görlitz
- Municipality: Kottmar

Area
  - Total: 17.37 km^{2} (6.71 sq mi)
- Elevation: 368 m (1,207 ft)

Population (2011-12-31)
  - Total: 4,481
  - Density: 258.0/km^{2} (668.1/sq mi)
- Time zone: UTC+01:00 (CET)
  - Summer (DST): UTC+02:00 (CEST)
- Postal codes: 02739
- Dialling codes: 03586
- Vehicle registration: GR
- Website: www.eibau.de

Eibau (German pronunciation: [ˈaɪbaʊ]; Upper Sorbian: Jiwow) is a former municipality in the district Görlitz, in Saxony, Germany. Eibau is known for the Eibauer Schwarzbier (black beer) brewed by Münch-Bräu Eibau. With effect from 1 January 2013, it has merged with Niedercunnersdorf and Obercunnersdorf, forming the new municipality of Kottmar.

The conductor Arthur Apelt (1907–1993) was born in Eibau.
