= Appelt =

Appelt may refer to:

- Dieter Appelt (born 1935), Austrian photographer
- Ingo Appelt (born 1961), Austrian bobsledder
- Ingo Appelt (comedian) (born 1967), German comedian
- Josh Appelt (born 1983), American mixed martial artist
- Kathi Appelt (born 1954), American writer

== See also ==
- Apelt
