= Großschweidnitzer Wasser =

River in Germany

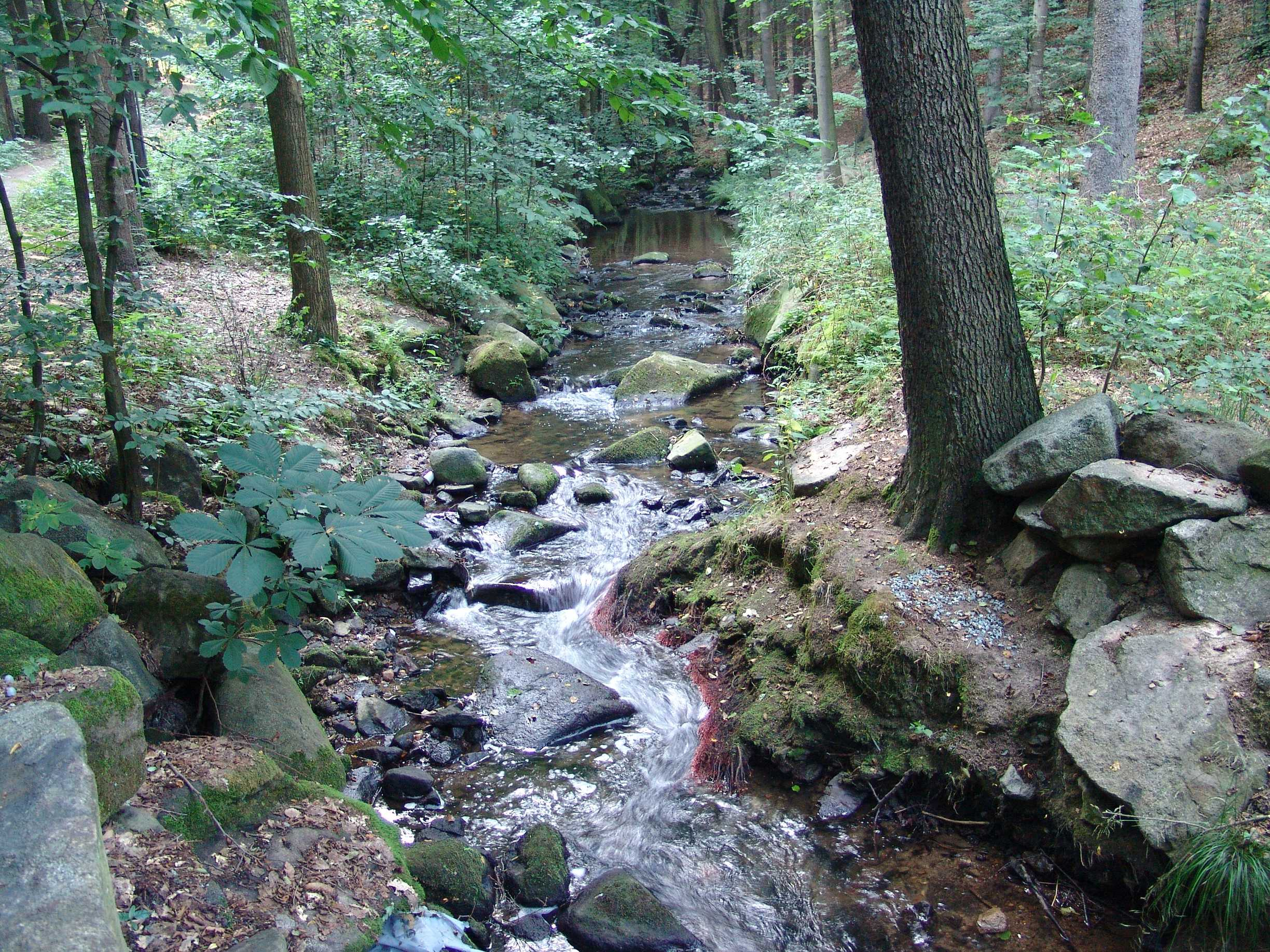

Location
- Country: Germany
- States: Saxony

Physical characteristics
- Mouth
  - location: Löbauer Wasser
  - coordinates: 51.0764°N 14.6678°E

Basin features
- Progression: Löbauer Wasser→ Spree→ Havel→ Elbe→ North Sea

Großschweidnitzer Wasser is a river of Saxony, Germany. It is the left source river of the Löbauer Wasser.

== See also ==
- List of rivers of Saxony
