= Herrnhut =

- Town
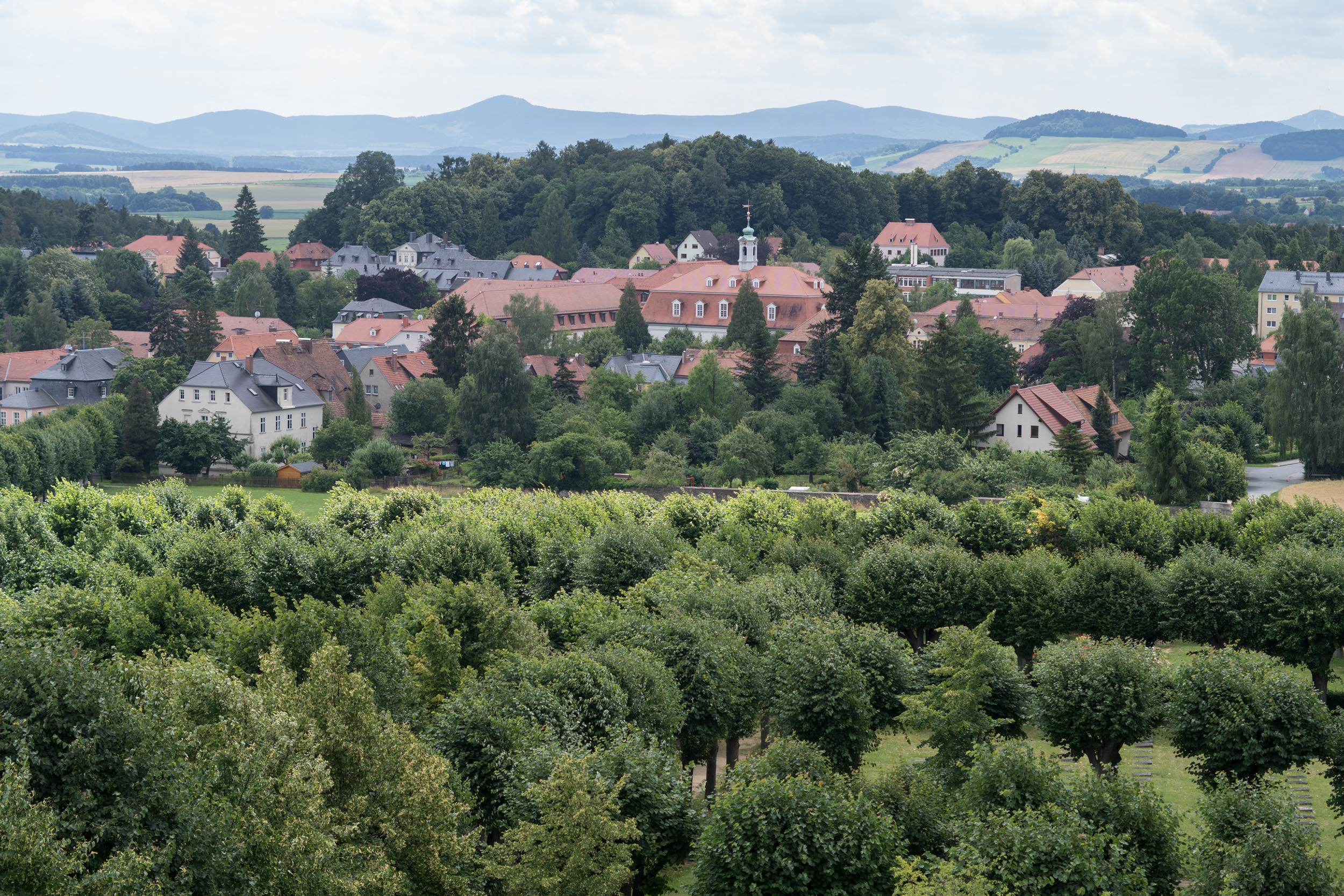
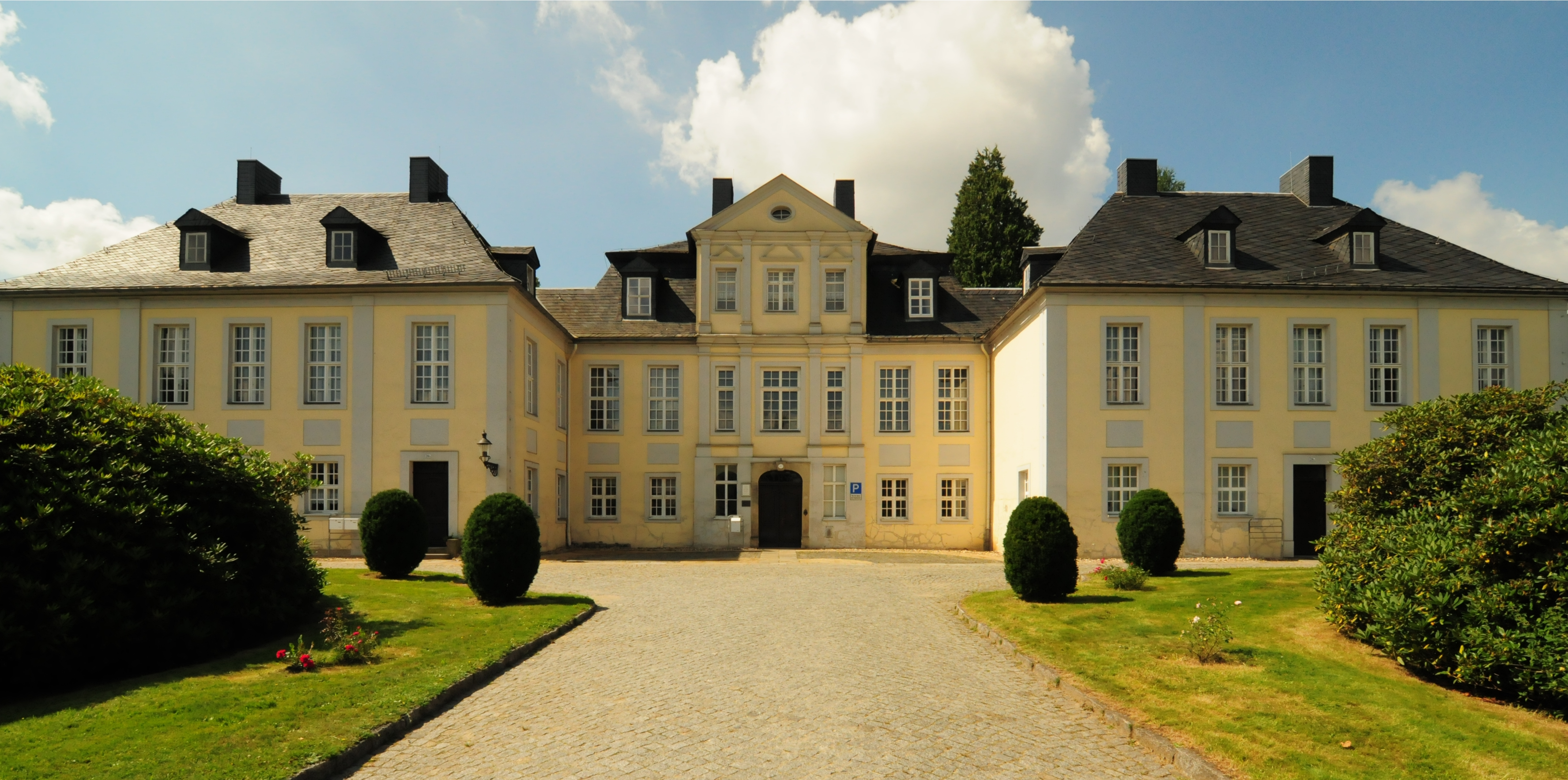
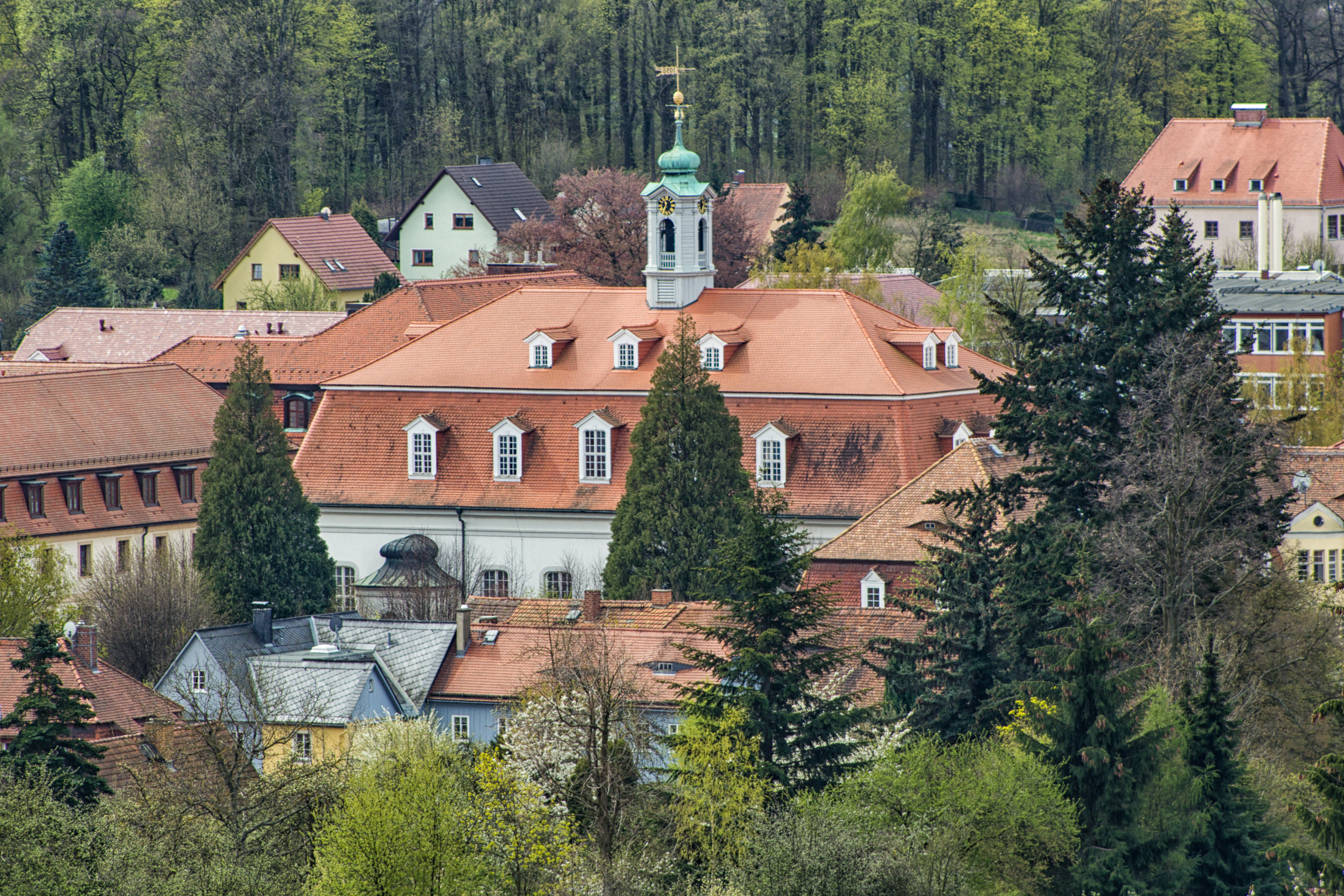
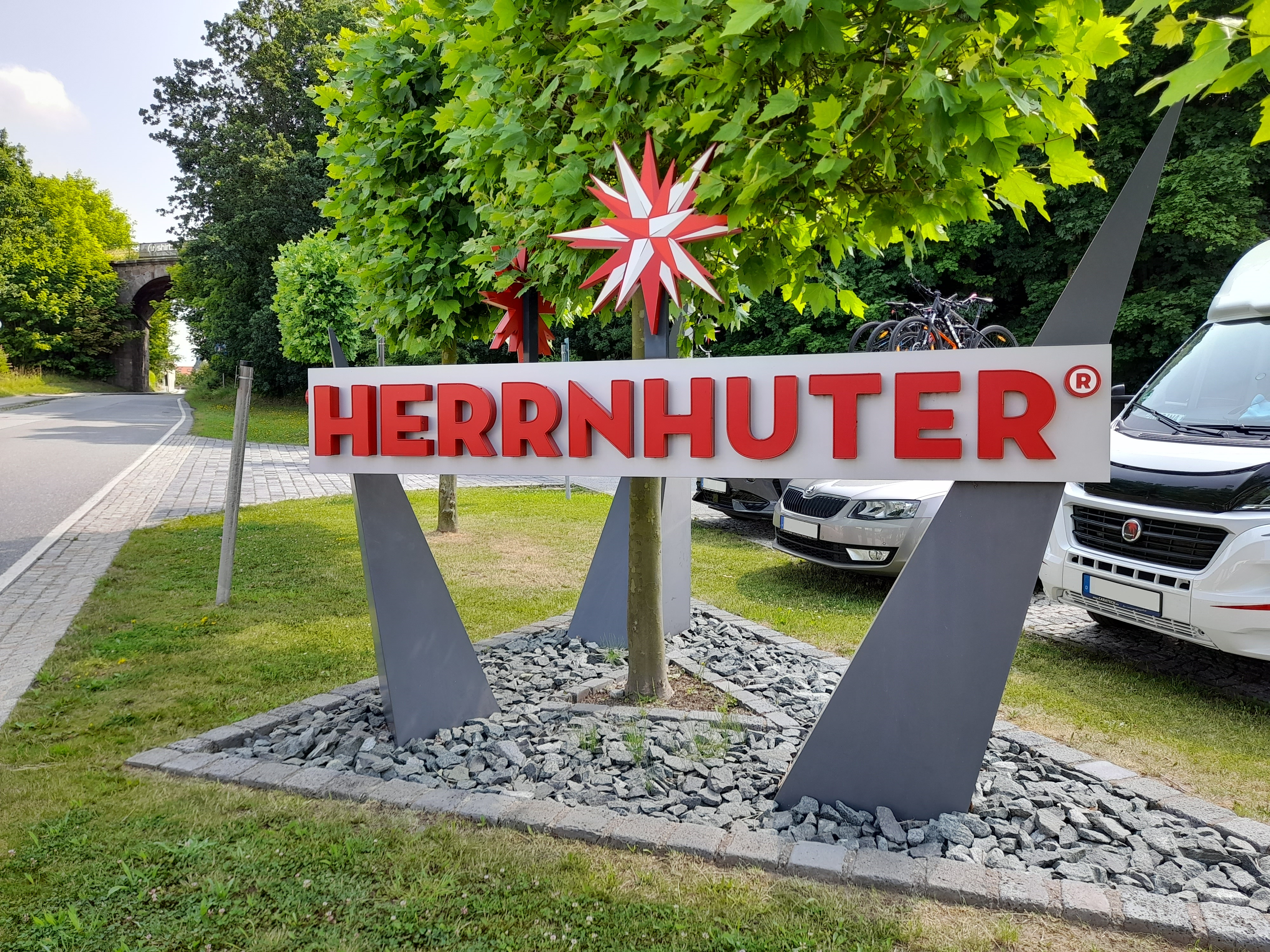
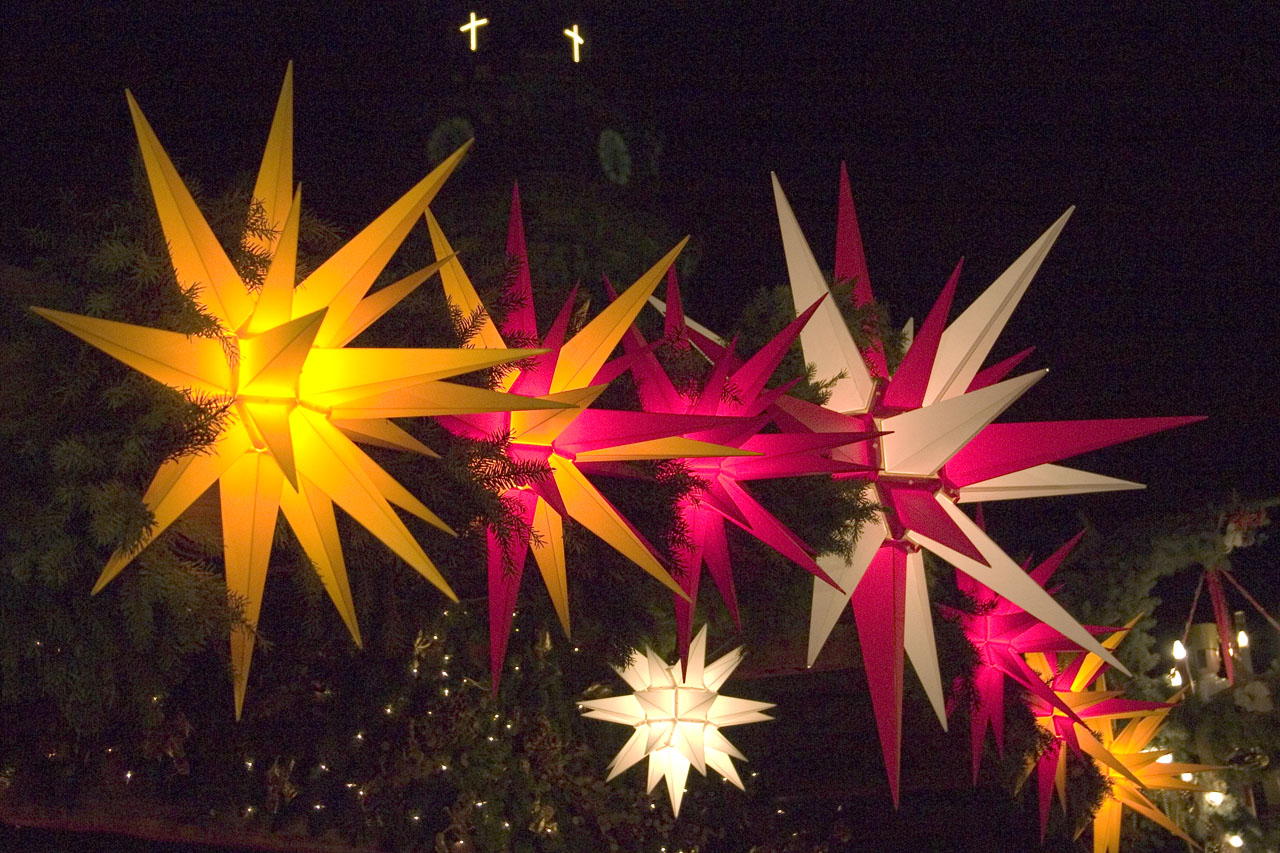
- Herrnhut seen against the Zittau Mountains Vogtshof, seat of the Moravian Church Kirchensaal of the Moravian Church Moravian Star lettering Moravian Stars in Dresden

- Coat of arms

- Location of Herrnhut within Görlitz district
- Interactive map of Herrnhut
- Location within Germany Location within Saxony
- Coordinates: 51°01′00″N 14°44′30″E
- Country: Germany
- State: Saxony
- District: Görlitz
- Subdivisions: 11

Government
  - Mayor (2022–29): Willem Riecke

Area
  - Total: 74.13 km^{2} (28.62 sq mi)
- Elevation: 344 m (1,129 ft)

Population (2025-12-31)
  - Total: 5,654
  - Density: 76.27/km^{2} (197.5/sq mi)
- Time zone: UTC+01:00 (CET)
  - Summer (DST): UTC+02:00 (CEST)
- Postal codes: 02747
- Dialling codes: 035873
- Vehicle registration: GR, LÖB, NOL, NY, WSW, ZI
- Website: www.herrnhut.de

Herrnhut
UNESCO World Heritage Site
- Interactive map of Herrnhut
- Part of: Moravian Church Settlements
- Criteria: iii, iv
- Reference: 1468
- Inscription: 2015 (39th Session)
- Extensions: 2024

Herrnhut (German: [ˈhɛʁnhuːt]; Upper Sorbian: Ochranow; Czech: Ochranov; Upper Lusatian: Harrnhutt, Harrnutt) is a town of around 6,000 inhabitants in Upper Lusatia, in the district of Görlitz, in eastern Saxony, Germany. The town is mainly known as the place of origin of the community of the Moravian Church (established by Nicolas Ludwig, Count von Zinzendorf in 1722), and of the Moravian Stars (Herrnhuter Sterne).

In 2016, the town was awarded the honorary title European City of the Reformation by the Communion of Protestant Churches in Europe, and in 2024, Herrnhut was inscribed on the World Heritage List as part of the serial site "Moravian Church Settlements" (Siedungen der Herrnhuter Brüdergemeine) alongside Christiansfeld (Denmark), Bethlehem (US) and Gracehill (Northern Ireland). Herrnhut lies between the larger towns of Löbau and Zittau in the hilly foreland of the Zittau Mountains on the Petersbach, the longest headstream of the Pließnitz, a tributary of the Lusatian Neisse.

== Geography ==
It is located in the historic Upper Lusatia region, on the road Bundesstraße 178, and on the Zittau–Löbau railway line. Herrnhut is about 10 km (6.2 mi) south-east of Löbau, 15 km (9.3 mi) north-west of Zittau, and 25 km (16 mi) south-west of the district capital Görlitz.

The municipality borders on, among other municipalities, Oderwitz.

=== Subdivisions ===
Herrnhut is also the name of the largest town in the municipality. Since 1 January 2013, when Berthelsdorf was incorporated, the municipal area contains 11 subdivisions:

- Herrnhut (original town)
- Ninive
- Ruppersdorf
- Schwan
- Friedensthal
- Strahwalde
- Euldorf
- Großhennersdorf
- Heuscheune
- Neundorf auf dem Eigen
- Schönbrunn
- Berthelsdorf
- Rennersdorf/O.L.

== History ==
Herrnhut proper was founded in the early 18th century by German-speaking members of the Unity of the Brethren, religious refugees from Margraviate of Moravia. The Unity of the Brethren arose after the reformer Jan Hus had been burnt at the stake during the Council of Constance in 1415. In the 18th century, they had to face the stern Counter-Reformation measures enacted in the Lands of the Bohemian Crown by the Habsburg rulers. From 1722 refugees came to Upper Lusatia, held by the Electors of Saxony since the Peace of Prague (1635). After meeting with their leader Christian David, a Moravian missionary, the German nobleman Count Nikolaus Ludwig von Zinzendorf (1700–1760) invited them to settle on his extended Berthelsdorf estates.

Shortly afterward, David built the first home in what was to become Herrnhut. Herrn Hut means "the Lord's watchful care" or "the Lord's protection". Zinzendorf himself had a new residence erected here in 1725–1727). From Herrnhut the community spread to Rixdorf near Berlin, the former Marienborn monastery near Büdingen, to Herrnhaag, to Norden, to Pawlowitzke (1771–1772). Numerous daughter churches arose all over the world. The first organized Protestant missionary movement began from Herrnhut in 1732, when 2 Bohemian Brethren went to the Danish West Indies, and then others went also to Greenland. The first North American mission work began in Savannah, Georgia in 1735. In 1738, the missionary station of Genadendal was founded in South Africa. Christiansfeld in Denmark followed in 1771.

Herrnhut holds a prominent place in the history of Protestantism, as well as the broader history of Christianity. Zinzendorf's community influenced John Wesley in creating Methodism and it contributed to the rise of Evangelicalism, a broad interdenominational movement of more than 300 million people all over the globe.

== Population ==
Year	1834	1871	1890	1910	1925	1939	1946	1950	1964	1990	2000	2010
Population	899	1092	1139	1364	1664	1627	2024	2025	1808	1754	2842	4963

According to the Saxon state congress in 1777, Herrnhut contained 76 homes.

In the mid-19th century the population rose above 1,000, and after World War II it reached more than 2,000. Since the 1950s there has been a decline in population, which was compensated for by the incorporation of neighboring municipalities.

== Location maps ==
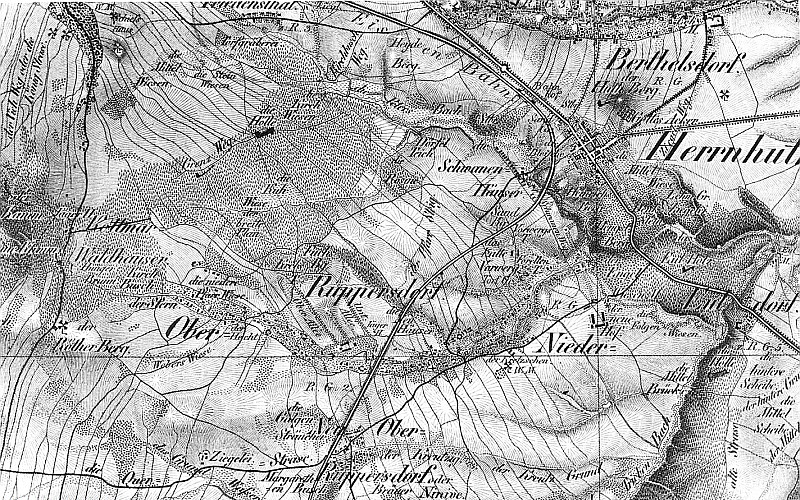
Map of Oberreit with Herrnhut, around 1845

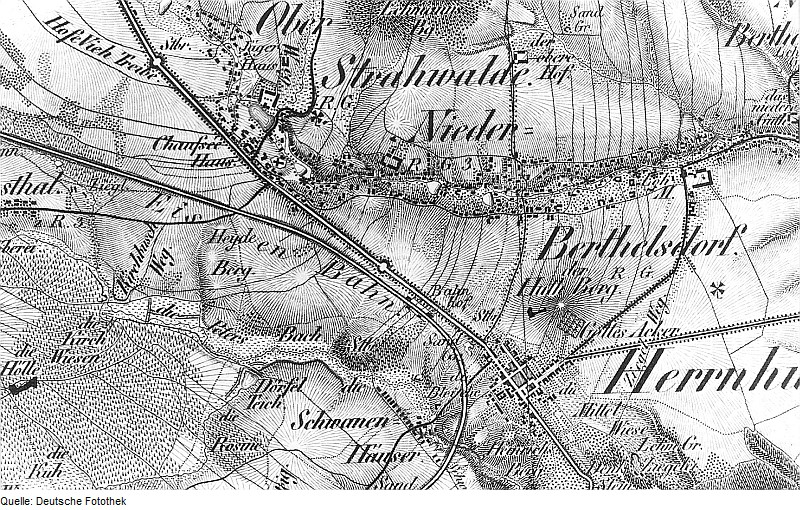
Map of Oberreit with Herrnhut and Strahwalde, around 1845

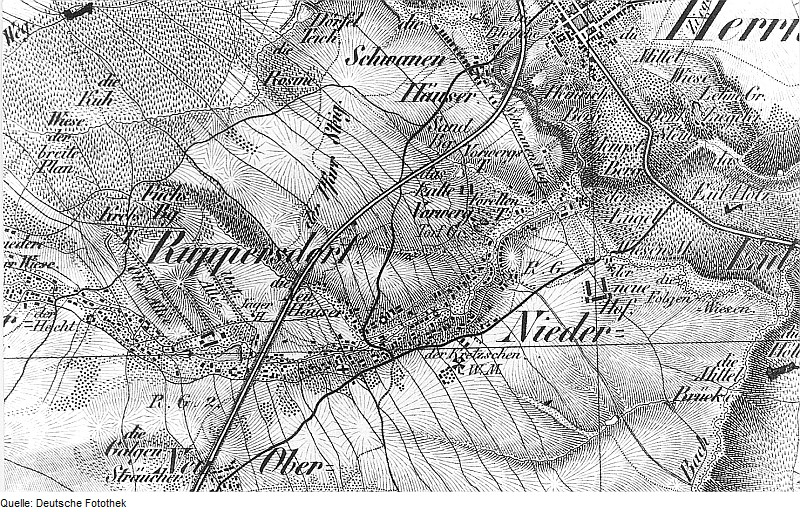
Map of Oberreit with Herrnhut and Ruppersdorf, around 1845

== Coat of arms ==
The Herrnhut coat of arms is blue and white, showing the tower of the Altan (the lookout tower) atop the Hutberg hill above the city. The name of Hutberg hill ("Hill of Watching") suggested the name of the Moravian settlement founded by these exiles on the Zinzendorf estate in 1722. Herrn Hut means "the Lord's Watchful care".

== Culture ==
Herrnhut has a church and two museums, including a museum of local history. It is the center of the worldwide Moravian Church, the Unitas Fratrum, in German Brüder-Unität or Brüdergemeine. Many European languages have named the Moravian Church movement directly after Herrnhut, for example hernhuutlus in Estonian, herrnhutilaisuus in Finnish, hernhūtieši in Latvian and herrnhutismen in both Norwegian and Swedish.

The former Herrnhut train station on the decommissioned railway line Zittau–Löbau has been turned into an art gallery.

== Economy ==
Its economy is based on church administration, education, tourism and manufacturing, including a 25-pointed star that is often hung in windows and on porches during the Christmas season, which has been produced for over 150 years. It is called the Moravian star or Moravian Advent star (Herrnhuter Adventsstern or simply Herrnhuter Stern). From Herrnhut, the Moravian star decoration has spread across Europe and America.

== Gallery ==
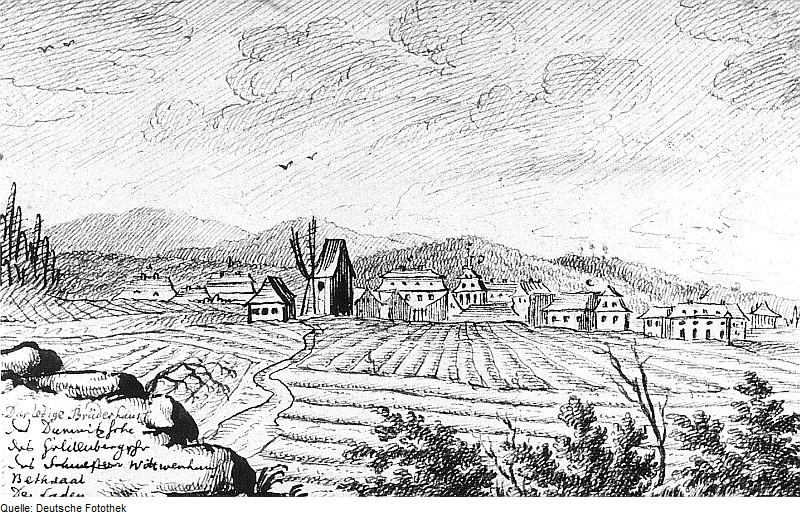
Herrnhut, 1765

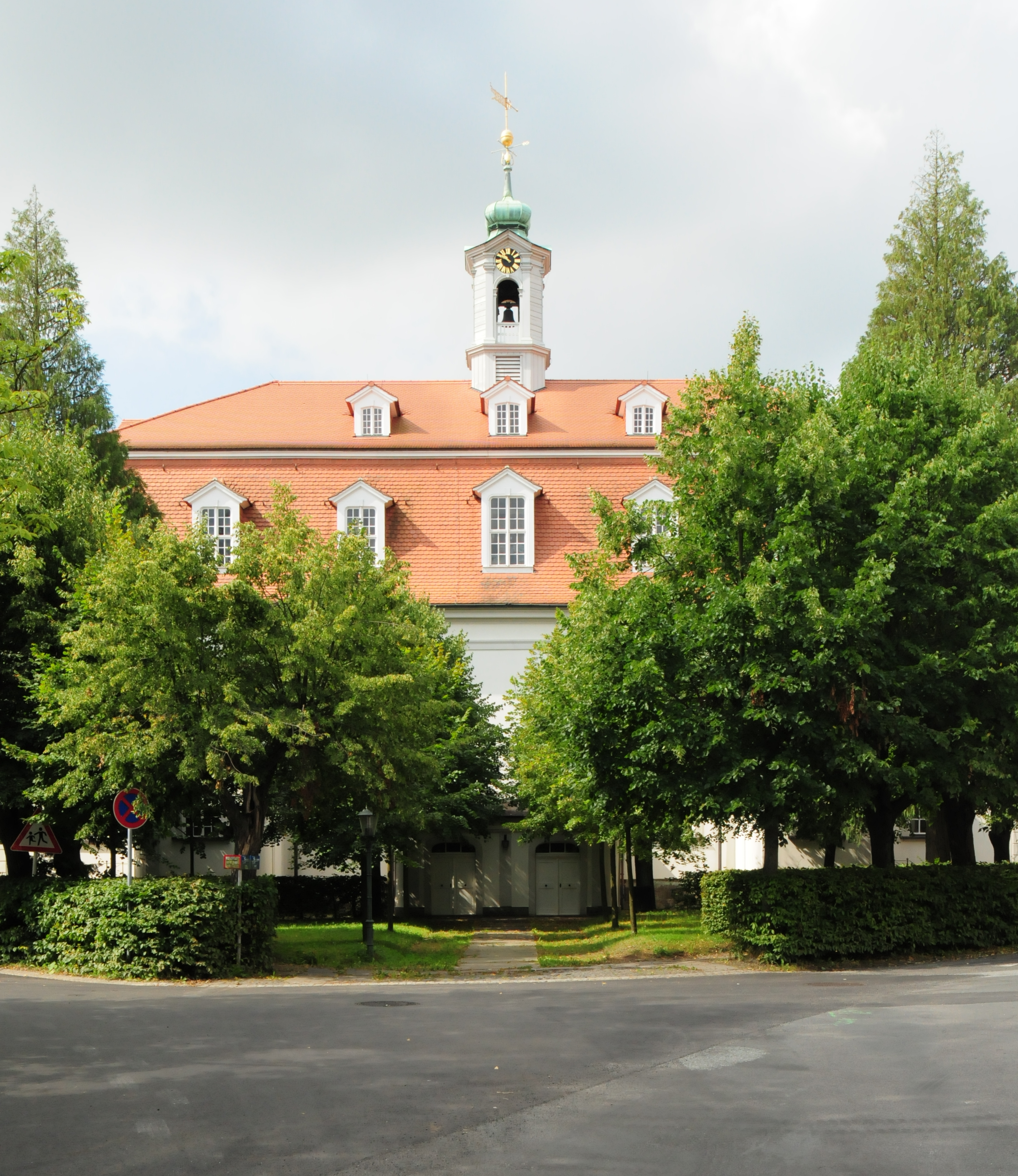
Church hall in Herrnhut

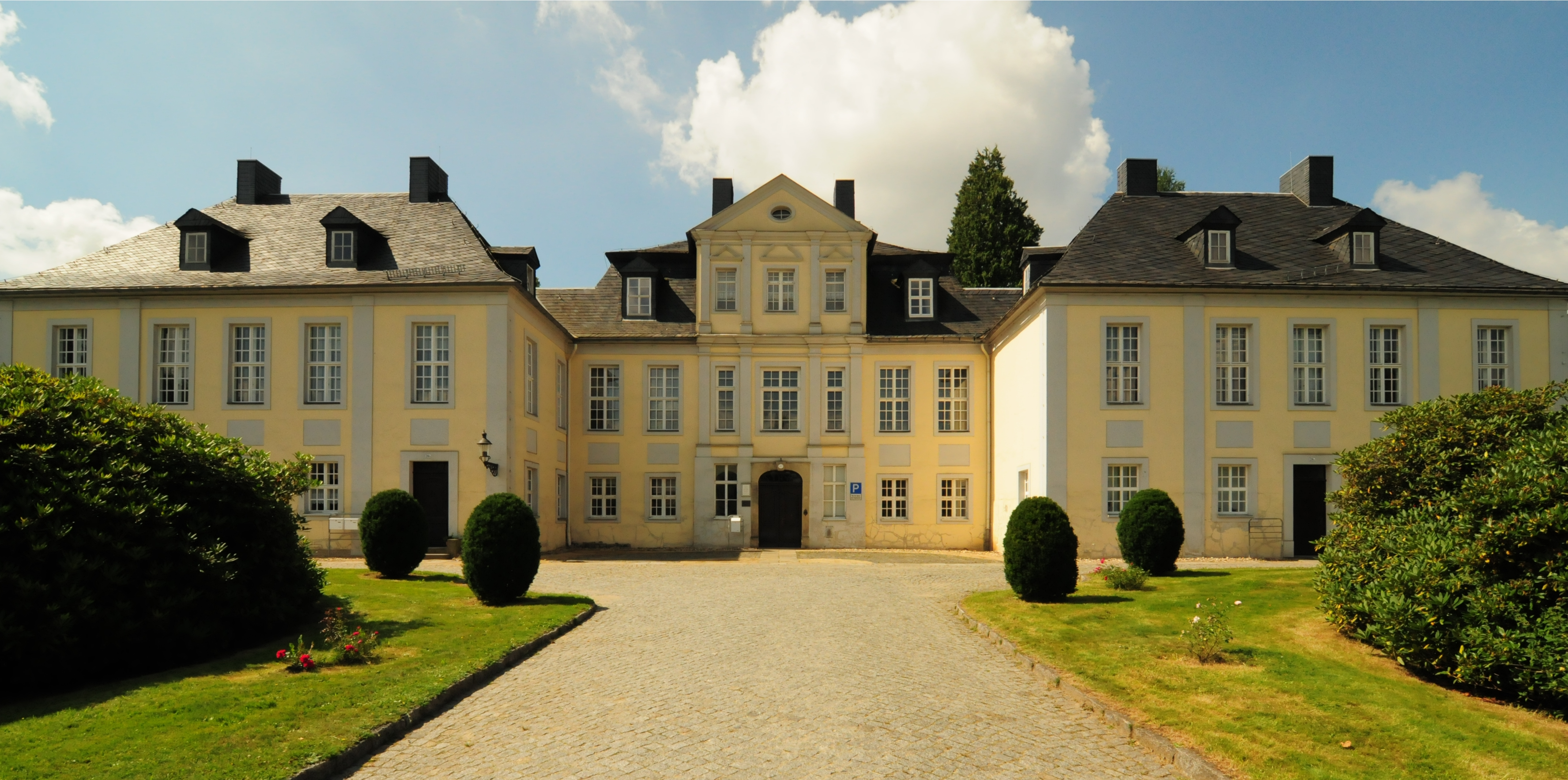
Vogtshof Herrnhut, seat of the Moravian Church

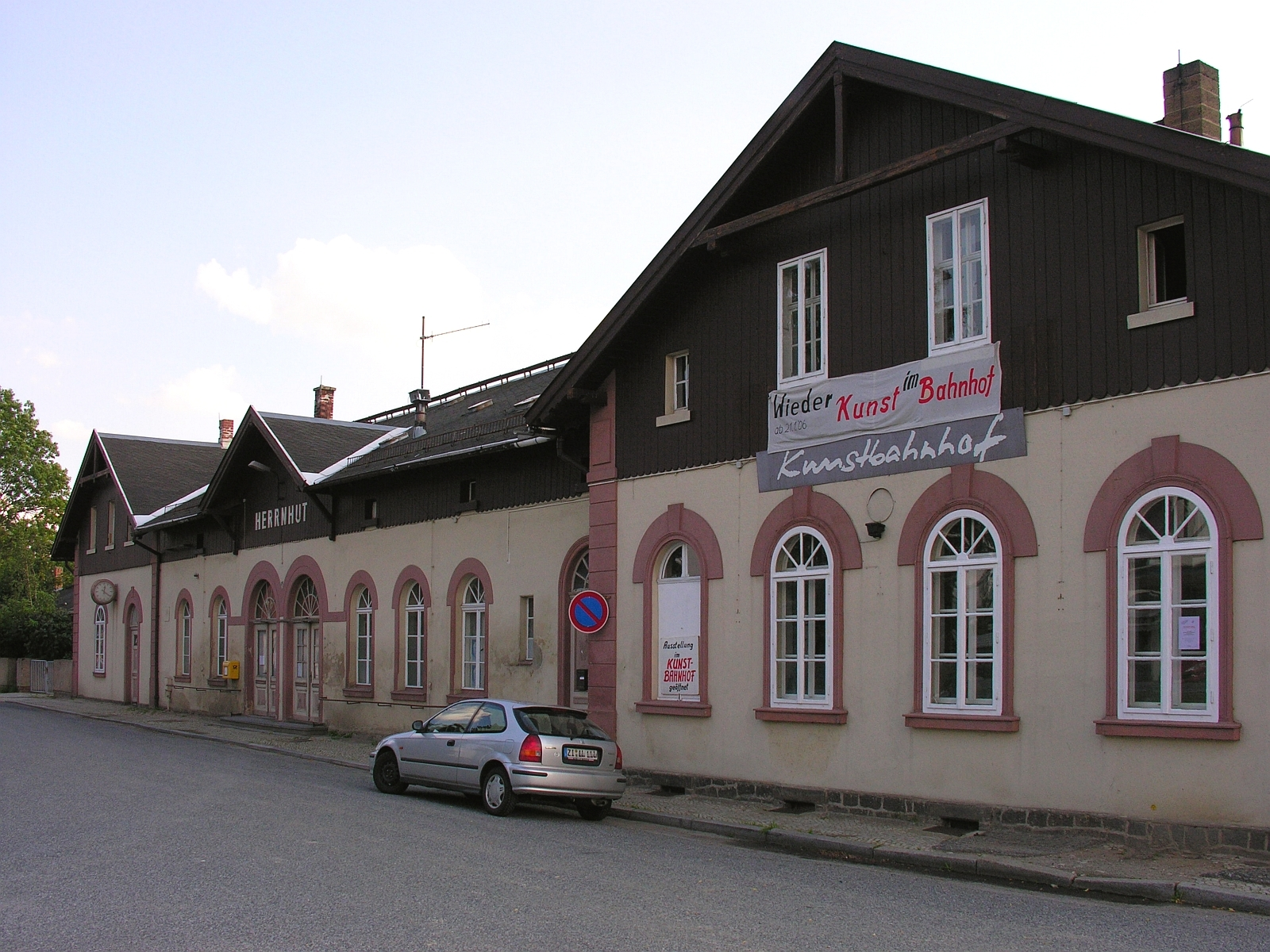
Herrnhut railway station also functions as an art gallery

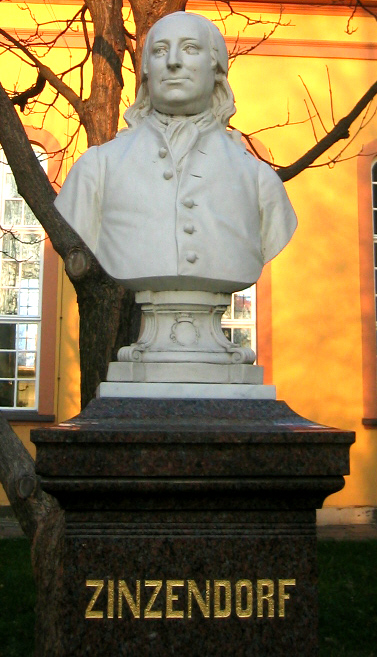
Nicolaus Zinzendorf monument in Herrnhut

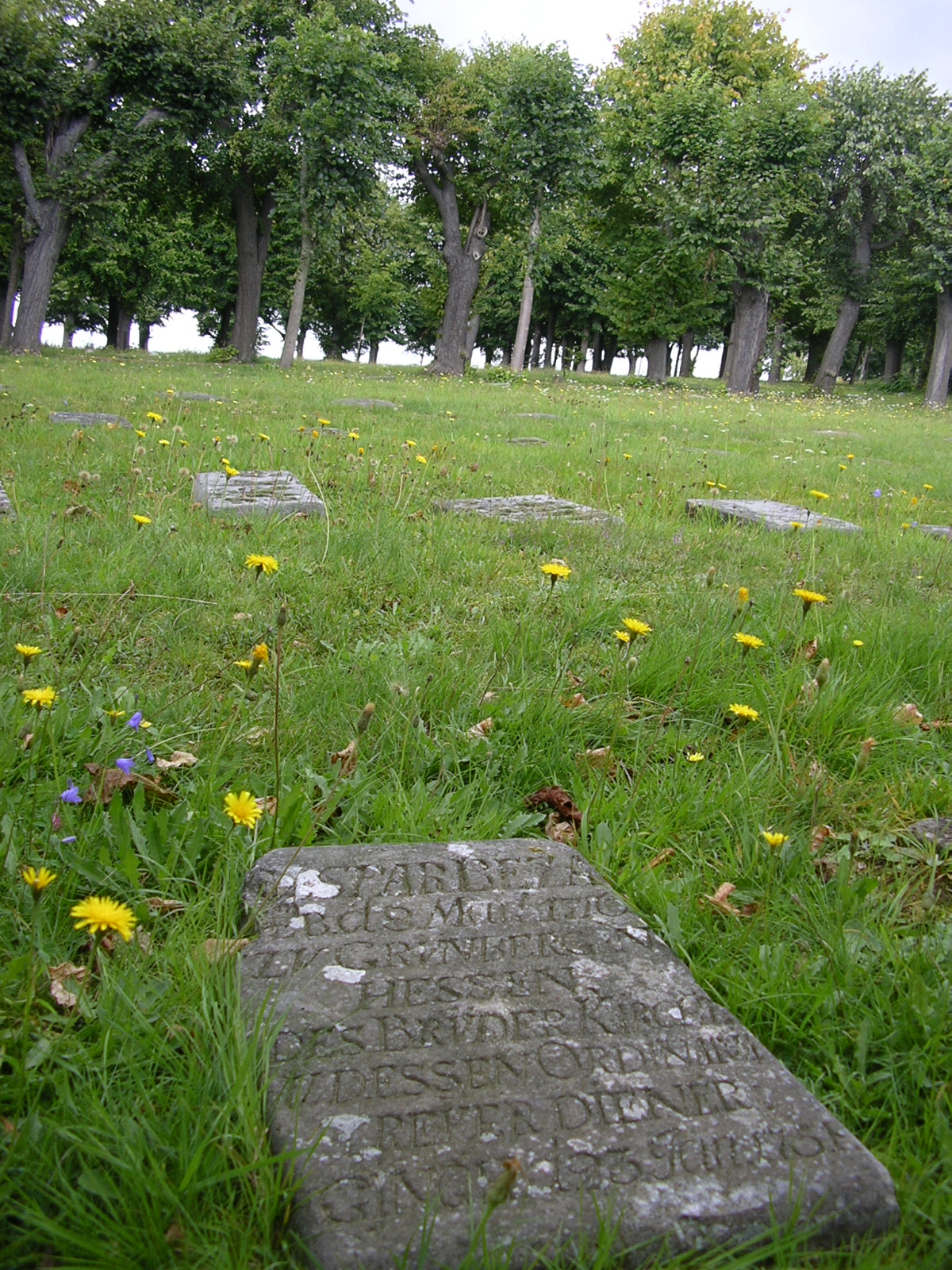
Herrnhut "God's Acre", the graveyard of the Moravian Church since the 18th century

== Notable people ==
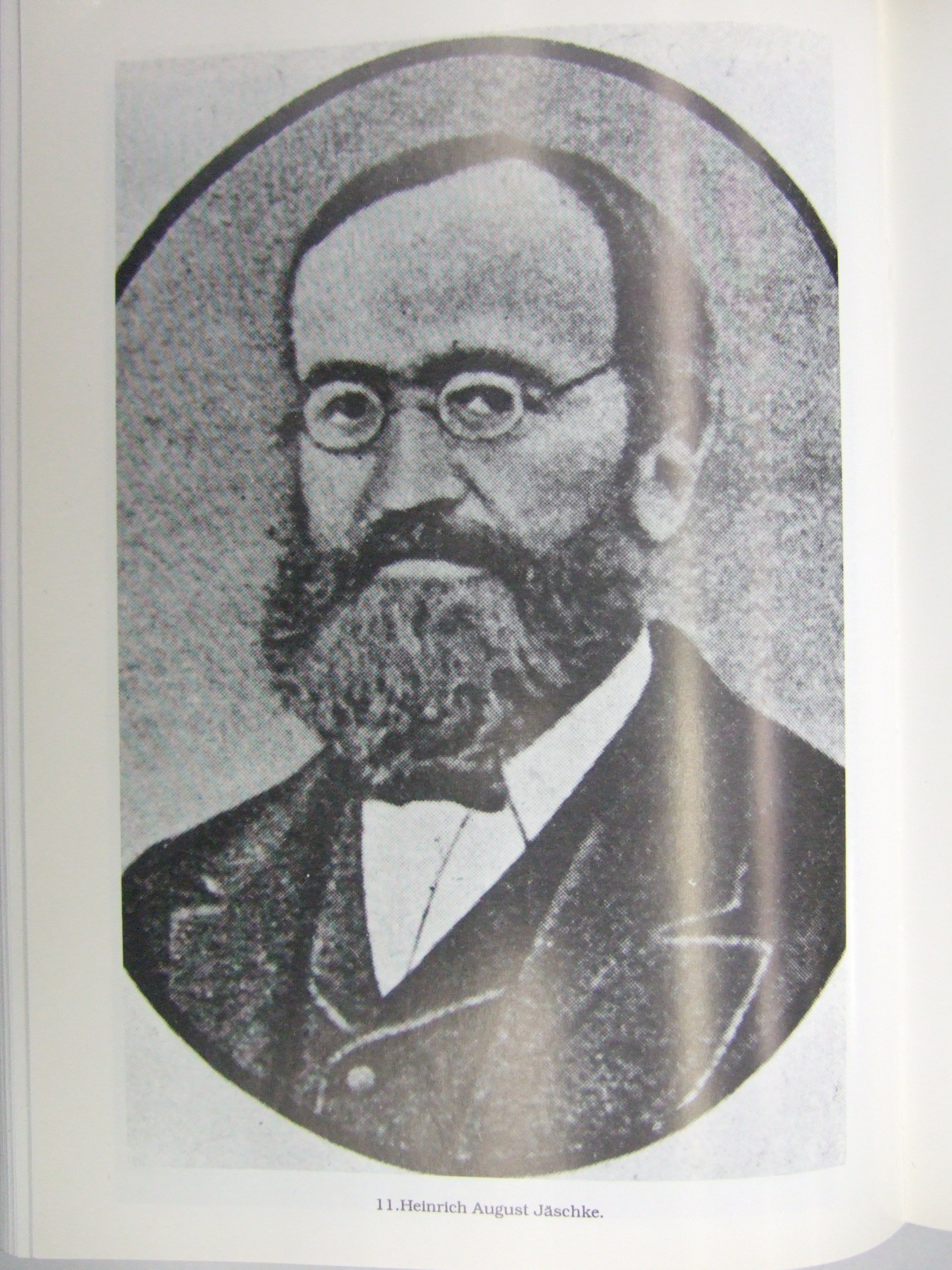
Heinrich August Jäschke

- Christian Renatus von Zinzendorf (1727–1752), church writer
- Heinrich August Jäschke (1817–1883), missionary, linguist and orientalist
- Adolf Heinrich Lier (1826–1882), landscape painter
- Hugo Theodor Christoph (1831–1894), entomologist
- Herbert Fischer (1914–2006), Ambassador of the GDR to India
- Martin Clemens (born 1939), Saxon politician (CDU) and former deputy of the Saxon Landtag
- David Gill (born 1966), Chief of the Federal Presidential Office under Joachim Gauck
