= Strahwalde =

- Stadtteil of Herrnhut
- Interactive map of Strahwalde
- Location within Germany Location within Saxony
- Coordinates: 51°2′0″N 14°43′12″E
- Country: Germany
- State: Saxony
- District: Görlitz
- Town: Herrnhut
- Subdivisions: 2

Area
  - Total: 9.89 km^{2} (3.82 sq mi)
- Elevation: 340 m (1,120 ft)

Population (2006-12-31)
  - Total: 798
  - Density: 80.7/km^{2} (209/sq mi)
- Time zone: UTC+01:00 (CET)
  - Summer (DST): UTC+02:00 (CEST)
- Postal codes: 02747
- Dialling codes: 035873
- Vehicle registration: GR

Strahwalde is a village and a former municipality in the district Görlitz, in Saxony, Germany. Since 1 January 2010, it is part of the town Herrnhut.
