= European City of the Reformation =

European City of the Reformation (German: Reformationsstadt Europas French: Cité européenne de la Réforme) is a honorific title bestowed upon European cities and towns which played an important role during the history of the Reformation.

This project was started by the Community of Protestant Churches in Europe to commemorate 500 years since the Reformation. The project commenced in 2012 when titles were given to 31 cities. In 2017, a roadshow and story-mobile travelled through the cities to promote the anniversary and the scheme.

In 2023, there are 102 such cities across 17 countries.
