= Arthur Apelt =

German conductor and music director (born 1907)

Arthur Apelt (25 August 1907 in Eibau – 1993) was a German conductor and Generalmusikdirektor.
