= Obercunnersdorf =

- Ortsteil of Kottmar
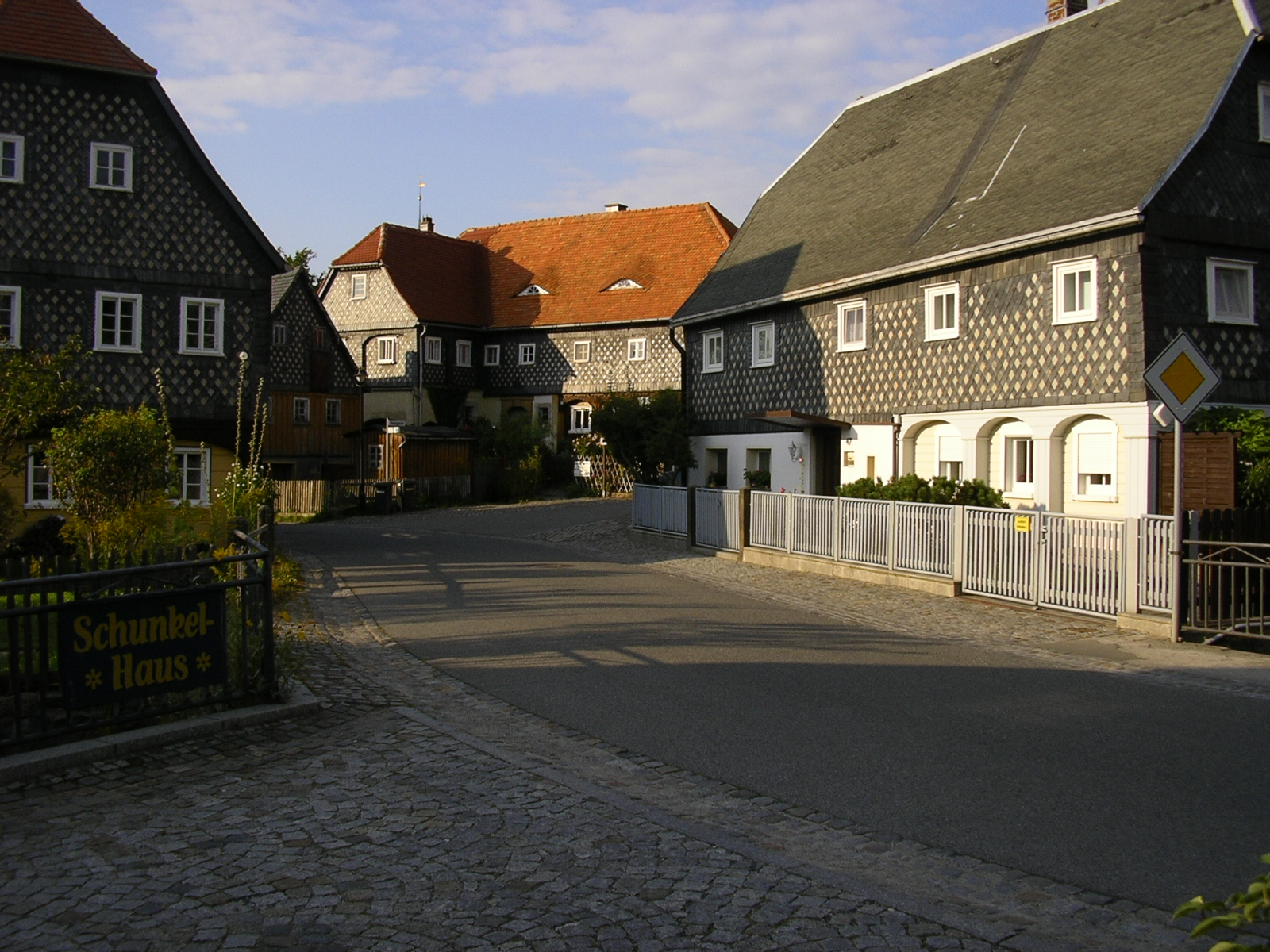

- Coat of arms
- Interactive map of Obercunnersdorf
- Location within Germany Location within Saxony
- Coordinates: 51°1′52″N 14°40′20″E
- Country: Germany
- State: Saxony
- District: Görlitz
- Municipality: Kottmar

Area
  - Total: 15.62 km^{2} (6.03 sq mi)
- Elevation: 358 m (1,175 ft)

Population (2011-12-31)
  - Total: 2,029
  - Density: 129.9/km^{2} (336.4/sq mi)
- Time zone: UTC+01:00 (CET)
  - Summer (DST): UTC+02:00 (CEST)
- Postal codes: 02708
- Dialling codes: 035875
- Vehicle registration: GR
- Website: www.obercunnersdorf.de

Obercunnersdorf (German pronunciation: [ˌoːbɐˈkʊnɐsdɔʁf], lit. 'Upper Cunnersdorf', in contrast to "Lower Cunnersdorf") is a former municipality in the district Görlitz, in Saxony, Germany. With effect from 1 January 2013, it has merged with Eibau and Niedercunnersdorf, forming the new municipality of Kottmar.
