= Niedercunnersdorf =

- Ortsteil of Kottmar
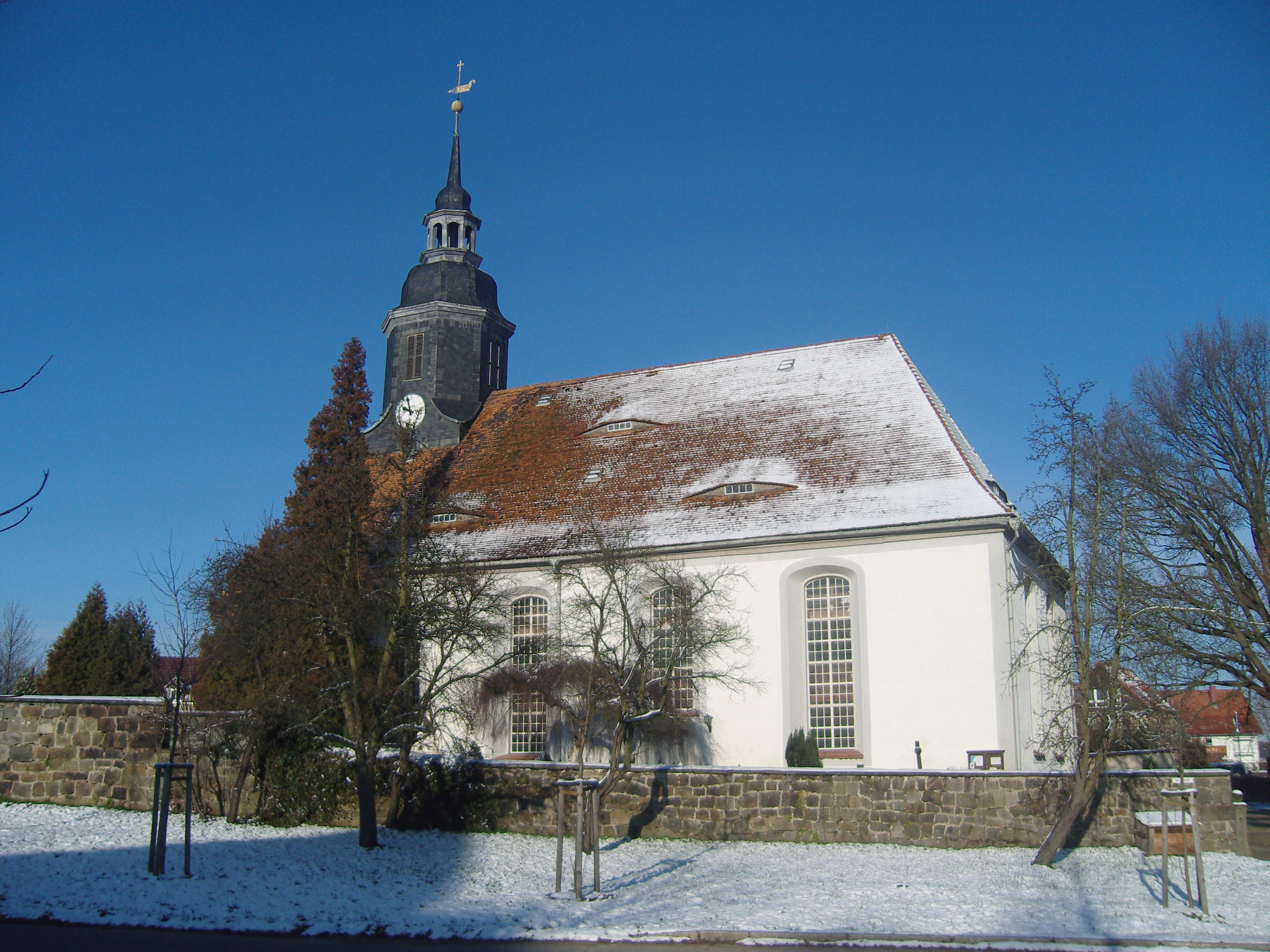
- Church
- Interactive map of Niedercunnersdorf
- Location within Germany Location within Saxony
- Coordinates: 51°03′0″N 14°39′40″E
- Country: Germany
- State: Saxony
- District: Görlitz
- Municipality: Kottmar

Area
  - Total: 14.17 km^{2} (5.47 sq mi)
- Elevation: 348 m (1,142 ft)

Population (2011-12-31)
  - Total: 1,576
  - Density: 111.2/km^{2} (288.1/sq mi)
- Time zone: UTC+01:00 (CET)
  - Summer (DST): UTC+02:00 (CEST)
- Postal codes: 02708
- Dialling codes: 035875
- Vehicle registration: GR
- Website: www.niedercunnersdorf.eu

Niedercunnersdorf (German pronunciation: [ˌniːdɐˈkʊnɐsdɔʁf], lit. 'Lower Cunnersdorf', in contrast to "Upper Cunnersdorf") is a former municipality in the district Görlitz, in Saxony, Germany. With effect from 1 January 2013, it has merged with Eibau and Obercunnersdorf, forming the new municipality of Kottmar.
