= Kottmar =

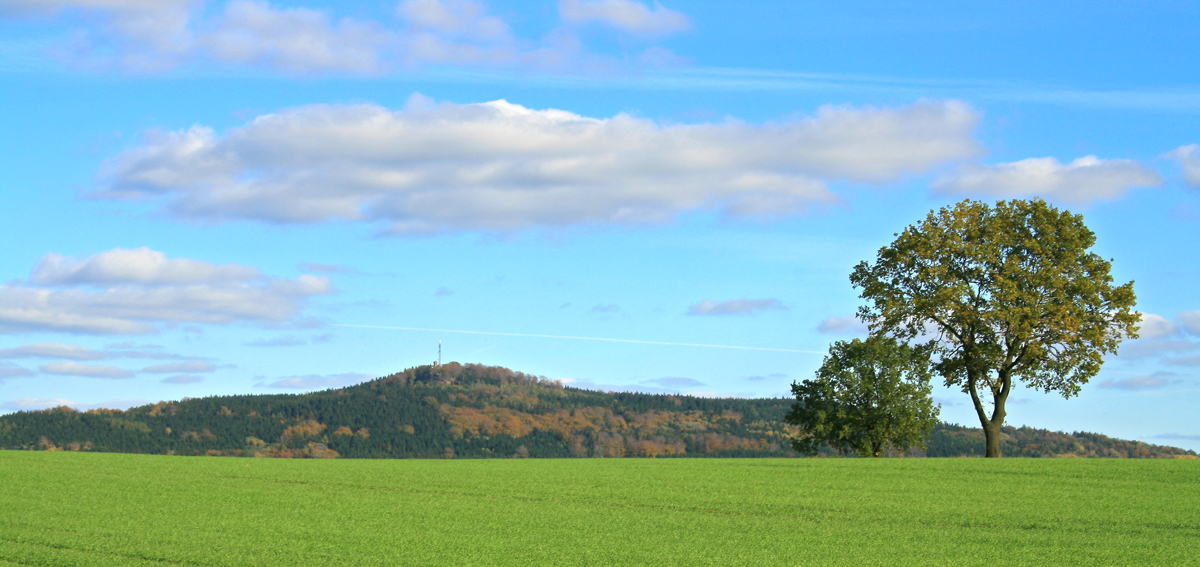
- Kottmar seen from Ebersbach

Highest point
- Elevation: 583 m (1,913 ft)
- Coordinates: 51°0′37″N 14°39′21″E

Geography
- Location within Saxony
- Location: Saxony, Germany
- Parent range: Lusatian Highlands

The Kottmar (German pronunciation: [ˈkɔtmaʁ]) is a mountain in Saxony, southeastern Germany. It is part of the Upper Lusatian Highlands (Oberlausitzer Bergland). Its elevation is 583m.

The Kottmar is an extinct Volcano from the Tertiary and made up of Phonolite.

At the foot of the Kottmar, one of the three sources of the river Spree as well as the Cunnersdorfer Wasser and the brook "Petersbach" have their springs. The Cunnersdorfer Wasser joins with the Spree and they empty into the North Sea, while the Petersbach empties into the Baltic Sea via the Neisse and Oder, which makes the Kottmar part of the Upper Lusatian Water divide.
