= Kretschmer =

Kretschmer is a German surname. It is an occupational surname literally meaning "innkeeper" associated with the word Kretscham, meaning village inn. It comes from the Middle High German word kretschmar, which was borrowed from a Slavic language, e.g. Czech krčmář. Other forms include Krechmer, Kretchmer, Kretschmar, Kretzschmar, and Kreczmar (Polonized form).

Notable people with the surname include:

- Daniel Kretschmer (born 1971), German hip hop and reggae musician
- Ernst Kretschmer (1888–1964), German psychiatrist
- Gero Kretschmer (born 1985), German tennis player
- Marlene Kretschmer, German statistician and climatologist
- Otto Kretschmer (1912–1998), German U-Boat commander in World War II
- Paul Kretschmer (1866–1956), German linguist
- Michael Kretschmer (born 1975), German politician
- Tim Kretschmer (1991–2009), German spree killer

== Krechmer ==
- Michael Krechmer, original name of Michael Malice, Ukrainian-American author, and podcaster
