= Kretzschmar =

Kretzschmar is a German surname. It comes from Middle High German kretschmar, which was borrowed from a Slavic language, e.g. Czech krčmář. Other forms include Kretschmar, Kretschmer, and Kreczmar (Polonized form).

Notable people with the surname include:

- Hermann Kretzschmar (1848–1924), German musicologist and writer
- Jörg Kretzschmar (born 1964), German footballer
- Max Kretzschmar (born 1993), English footballer
- Stefan Kretzschmar (born 1973), German handball player
- Waltraud Kretzschmar (1948–2018), East German handball player
