= Norfolk Scope =

Multi-function arena in Norfolk, Virginia, United States

Coordinates: 36°51′11.79″N 76°17′12.20″W

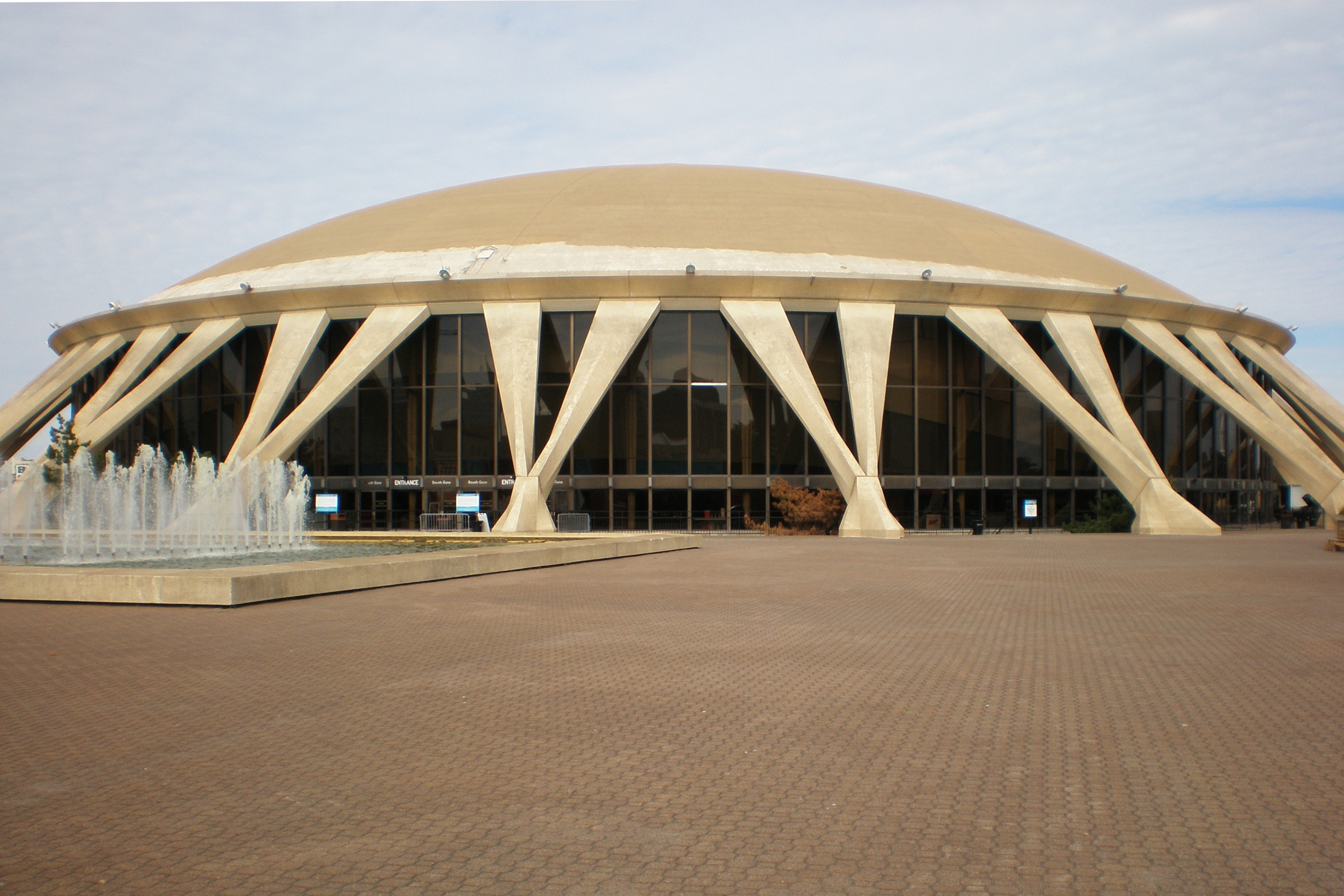
- The arena in 2006
- Interactive map of Norfolk Scope
- Address: 201 East Brambleton Avenue; Norfolk, Virginia; United States
- Owner: City of Norfolk
- Operator: City of Norfolk
- Capacity: Arena: Ice hockey: 8,701; Basketball: 10,253; Concerts: 13,800; Prism Theatre: ~4,000

Construction
- Groundbreaking: June 6, 1968
- Opened: November 12, 1971
- Cost: $35 million ($278 million in 2025 dollars) $14.5 million (upgrades since 2003)
- Architects: Pier Luigi Nervi; Williams and Tazewell
- Structural engineer: Fraioli-Blum-Yesselman
- General contractor: Daniel Construction Co.

Norfolk Scope is a multi-function complex in Norfolk, Virginia, comprising the 11,000-seat Scope Arena, a 2,500-seat theater known as Chrysler Hall, a 65,000-square-foot (6,000 m^{2}) modular exhibition hall, and a 600-car parking garage.

The arena was designed by Italian architect/engineer Pier Luigi Nervi in conjunction with the (now defunct) local firm Williams and Tazewell, which designed the entire complex. Nervi's design for the arena's reinforced concrete dome derived from the PalaLottomatica and the much smaller Palazzetto dello Sport, which were built in the 1950s for the 1960 Summer Olympics in Rome.

Construction on Scope began in June 1968 at the northern perimeter of Norfolk's downtown and was completed in 1971 at a cost of $35 million. Federal funds covered $23 million of the cost, and when it opened formally on November 12, 1971, the structure was the second-largest public complex in Virginia, behind only the Pentagon.

Featuring the world's largest reinforced thinshell concrete dome (though eclipsed by the Seattle Kingdome from 1976 to 2000), Scope won the Virginia Society of the American Institute of Architects Test of Time award in 2003. Wes Lewis, director of Old Dominion University's civil engineering technology program, called it "a beautiful marrying of art and engineering." Noted architectural critic James Howard Kunstler described the design as looking like "yesterday's tomorrow."

The name "Scope", a contraction of kaleidoscope, emphasizes the venue's re-configurability. The facility logo (right), which features a multi-colored, abstracted kaleidoscope image, was designed by Raymond Loewy's firm Loewy/Snaith of New York.

== History and design ==
After watching the 1960 Rome Summer Olympics on television, and seeing the Palazzo dello Sport and Palazzetto dello Sport, Brad Tazewell and Jim Williams, two Norfolk architects, solicited Senator A. Willis Robertson, father of Pat Robertson, to build a sports complex in Norfolk. Subsequently, President Lyndon B. Johnson asked Robertson to support federal funding for a multimillion-dollar cultural center in Colorado, and Robertson said he would if Johnson would support one in Norfolk. Williams and Tazewell was subsequently commissioned; they in turn commissioned Nervi.

The complex was an important part of the first phase of Norfolk's post-World War II revitalization. A large section of the city's downtown was razed, and the Scope complex was to "anchor" its northern corner, with the Vincent Kling designed courthouse and civic complex anchoring the eastern edge of downtown.

The arena is located on its 14-acre (5.7 ha) site above a raised plinth, below which is located a parking garage for 640 cars. The facility includes a 65,000 sq ft (6,000 m^{2}) exhibit hall as well as the adjacent Chrysler Hall, a music and theater venue, home to the Virginia Symphony Orchestra. The arena's seating can be reconfigured to accommodate from 10,253 for sporting events up to 13,800 for concerts.

With a concrete monolithic dome measuring 440 feet (130 m) in diameter and a height of 110 feet (34 m), the dome was, at the time of its construction, the largest of its kind in the world — and was displaced as the record holder after the construction of the Seattle Kingdome. After the demolition of the larger Kingdome in 2000, Scope reclaimed the title as having the world's largest reinforced thin-shell concrete dome. Supported by 24 flying buttresses, the arena roof encloses 85,000 sq ft (7,900 m^{2}). With over 1,000 pilings, the facility was constructed 10 feet (3.0 m) below the city's water table. The roof is a ribbed concrete dome, independent of seating bowl formed of sloped concrete beams supporting precast treads and risers which form the seating bowl. The perimeter of the dome roof is supported by a combination of vertical columns and inclined buttresses, which tie into a tension ring below ground. A concentric ring, approximately 7' 9" wide, is suspended from the dome, for service and lighting needs.

During preparations for the first hosting of the Ringling Bros. and Barnum & Bailey Circus, a bear escaped its cage and ran across the wet paint on the floor of the unfinished Exhibition Hall below. During the first presentation in the Exhibition Hall of the Hampton Roads Automobile Show, visitors could spot bear tracks in the painted floor, between the exhibitions. (Source: The Virginian-Pilot)

The arena has undergone $11 million of renovations since 2003, including the replacement of a center-hung scoreboard with a matrix screen on each side with a center-hung scoreboard with LED video and matrix boards and two LED end-zone videoboards in 2008. A new glass wall has been installed, and is expected to be extended in order to expand the arena's main concourse at a cost of $3.5 million in 2014. This would result in additional restrooms and concession stands at the arena.

There has been discussion about expanding the Norfolk Scope, by adding 5,000 seats and 24 luxury suites, in the near future, in order to remain competitive with neighboring venues in the southeastern and mid-Atlantic states. In 2018, the city decided to move on from the renovation concept, which would total $200 million. In his 2019 State of the City address, Norfolk mayor Kenny Alexander announced plans to study the possibility of building a new arena, in a not yet named location. In March 2024, the city once again considered renovating Scope and potentially adding more seats.

National Wrestling Alliance, Jim Crockett Promotions, World Championship Wrestling and World Wrestling Entertainment had wrestling shows in Scope many times from the 1970s on, many times as a pay-per-view event. The biggest was Starrcade '88 in December 1988. The venue also hosted WCW's Starrcade 1991 PPV & World War 3 PPV in November 1995 and 1996, featuring the 3 ringed battle royal. On April 27, 1998, during the Monday Night War, professional wrestling stable D-Generation X drove a jeep up to the doors of the venue during an episode of WCW Monday Nitro.

The arena has hosted the Mid-Eastern Athletic Conference (MEAC) men's and women's basketball conference championship tournaments since 2013.

Events and tenants
Preceded by TNA Impact! Zone	Host of Destination X 2008	Succeeded by TNA Impact! Zone
