= Kretchmer =

Kretchmer is a German surname a form of Kretschmer, which is occupational surname literally meaning "innkeeper", originally borrowed from Slavic languages. Notable people with the surname include:

- Ido Krechmer, musician from Israeli band Men of North Country
- John T. Kretchmer, American film and television director and television producer
- Jerome Kretchmer (born 1934), American politician
- Jordan Kretchmer, a founder of Livefyre
- Steven Kretchmer, American inventor who improved the tension ring.
