= Minusheet perfusion culture system =

System used for advanced cell culture experiments

Minusheet perfusion culture system is used for advanced cell culture experiments in combination with adherent cells and to generate specialized tissues in combination with selected biomaterials, special tissue carriers and compatible perfusion culture containers.

The technical development of the Minusheet perfusion culture system was driven by the idea to create under in vitro conditions an environment resembling as near as possible the situation of specialized tissues found within the organism. The basis of this invention is therefore individually selected biomaterials for optimal cell adhesion mounted in Minusheet tissue carriers. Moreover, to always offer fresh nutrition including respiratory gas and to simulate a tissue-specific fluid environment, the tissue carriers can be inserted into compatible perfusion culture containers. As a result, a variety of publications illustrates that tissues generated by this innovative approach exhibit an excellent and stable quality. Thus, on the one hand, the system provides a highly adaptable basis for the culture of adherent cells and the generation of specialized tissues. On the other hand the Minusheet perfusion culture system is bridging a methodical gap between the conventional static 24-well culture plate and modern perfusion culture technology.

== Crucial generation of specialized tissues ==
Specialized tissues in culture are urgently needed in regenerative medicine, tissue engineering, nanotechnology, biomaterial research and advanced toxicity testing of newly developed pharmaceuticals. However, it is often observed that raised tissues do not exhibit expected functional features. Instead, dedifferentiation is observed [1-4]. These cell biological alterations arise after the isolation of cells and proceed during static culture in a dish due to a suboptimal fluid environment and minor adhesion on biomaterials. Further uncontrolled supply with nutrition and respiratory gas, an overshoot of metabolites and paracrine factors or missing rheological stress can increase the degree of dedifferentiation. In consequence, regarding an optimal generation of specialized tissues, a powerful strategy has to exclude as many as possible harmful parameters, while factors supporting the process of tissue development must be intensified.

== Selected biomaterials promote development within a tissue carrier ==
Under natural conditions, a prerequisite for optimal tissue development is a cell-specific interaction with the extracellular matrix, while under in vitro conditions, a substitute for the extracellular matrix has to be selected. However, the crucial problem is that a biomaterial can influence the development of functional features within a maturing tissue in a good and a bad sense. In consequence, the suitability of a decellularized extracellular matrix, newly developed synthetic polymers, biodegradable scaffolds, ceramics or metal alloys cannot be predicted but must be tested. To meet parameters positively influencing cell adhesion and communication, the technical concept is based on a Minusheet tissue carrier (Fig. 1). With the help of this tool cell adhesion and development of tissue can be tested with individually selected biomaterials. These experiments can be performed first under static (Fig. 2) and then under dynamic (Fig. 3) culture conditions. In both cases, a Minusheet tissue carrier prevents damage but supports the development of contained cells or tissues during experimentation.

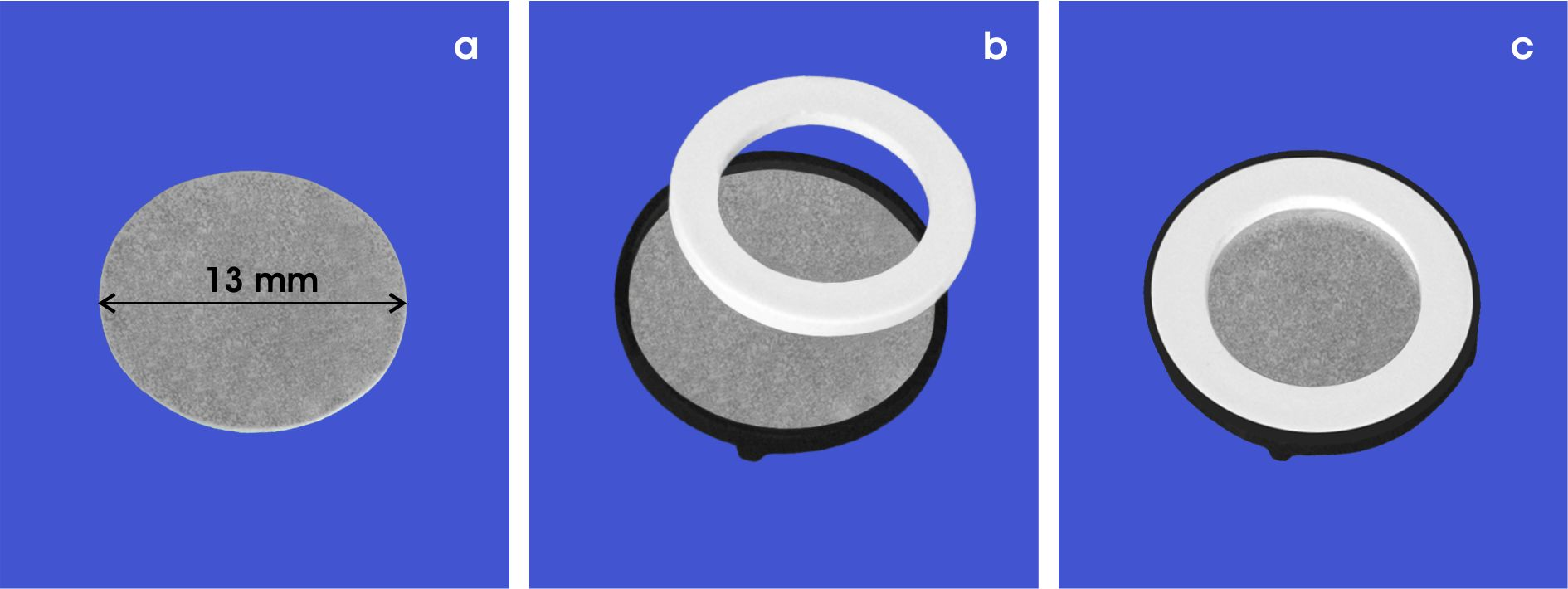
Figure 1: Mounting of a Minusheet tissue carrier. (a) First an individual biomaterial measuring 13 mm in diameter is selected. (b) For mounting the biomaterial is placed in the base part of a tissue carrier. (c) After pressing down a tension ring the mounted tissue carrier can be used for cell seeding. For improved provision with medium a tissue carrier rests with protrusions at the bottom of a dish.

To stay compatible with a conventional 24-well culture plate a selected biomaterial must be punched in a diameter of 13 mm. In this format, many materials are also commercially available. Further materials can be applied in the form of filters, foils, nets, fleeces and scaffolds (Fig. 1a). For easy handling and to prevent damage during development the selected specimens are placed in the base part of a Minusheet tissue carrier (Fig. 1b). Pressing down a tension ring the biomaterial is held in position (Fig. 1c). After mounting a tissue carrier is enveloped in a bag and sterilized.

== Cell seeding on a tissue carrier ==
For cell seeding the mounted tissue carrier is transferred by forceps in a 24-well culture plate (Fig. 2). To concentrate cells on top of a tissue carrier culture medium is added to a level so that the selected biomaterial is just wetted. Then an aliquot of cells is transferred by a pipette to the surface of the mounted biomaterial.

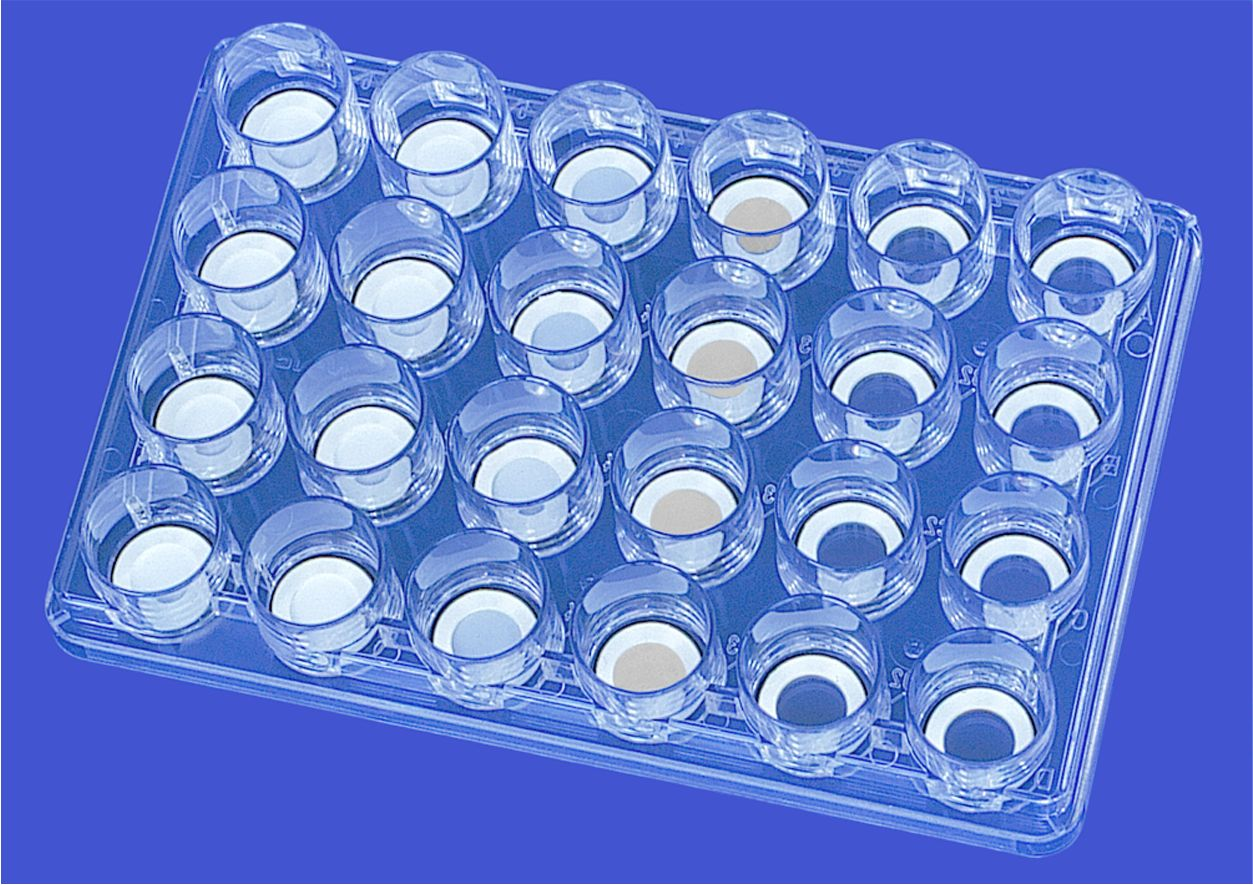
Figure 2: Minusheet tissue carriers including different biomaterials within a 24-well culture plate. Cell seeding is performed in the static environment of this dish.

A standard culture protocol with a tissue carrier can be initiated by seeding cells onto the upper side. When a tissue carrier is turned, cells can also be seeded on the other side so that co-culture experiments with two different cell types become possible. Not only single cells but also a thin slice of tissue can be mounted between two pieces of a woven net within a Minusheet tissue carrier. Further flexible materials such as collagen sheets can be used in a tissue carrier like the skin of a drum. Last but not least excellent results were obtained by mounting a polyester fleece as an artificial interstitium for spatial parenchyma development [5,6,8]. It is obvious that for each specialized tissue, very individual spatial environments within a tissue carrier can be created.

== Compatible perfusion culture containers ==
It has been shown that the static environment within a 24-well culture plate leads to a decrease in nutrition and hormones, an uncontrollable increase of metabolites and an overshoot of paracrine factors over time. Due to these reasons, a Minusheet tissue carrier with adherent cells is used only for the short period of cell seeding in a 24-well culture plate. In consequence, after the adhesion of cells, the tissue carrier is transferred to a perfusion culture container to offer a dynamic fluid environment. To meet the individual requirements of specialized tissues a variety of perfusion culture containers was constructed (Fig. 3).

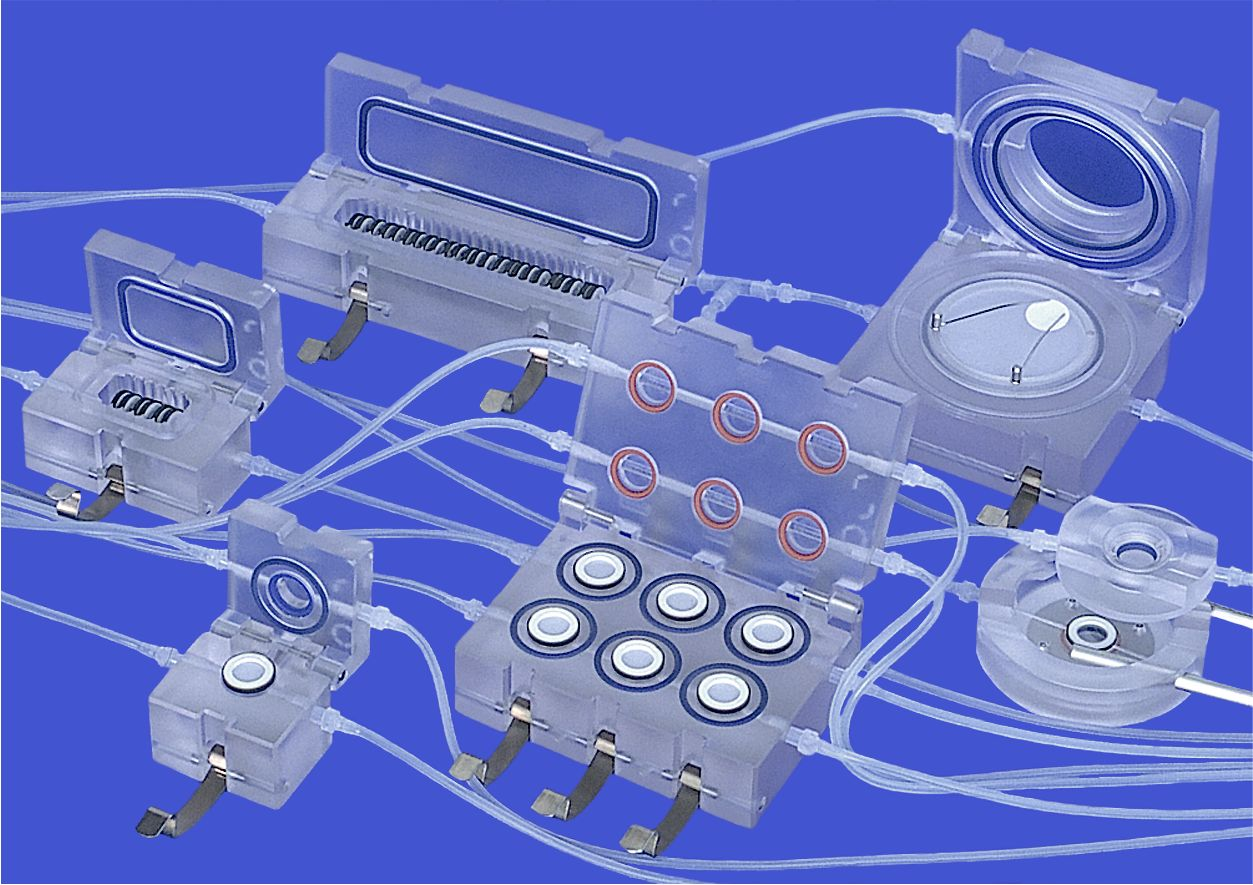
Figure 3: Variety of perfusion culture containers for insertion of Minusheet tissue carriers.

Each of the perfusion culture containers has at least one inlet and one outlet for the transport of the culture medium. A basic version of a container allows the simple bathing of cells respectively growing tissues under continuous medium transport (Fig. 4a). In a gradient container the tissue carrier is placed between the base and the lid so that both sides can be provided with individual media mimicking a typical environment for epithelia (Fig. 4b). A further culture container is made of a transparent lid and base allowing the microscopic observation during tissue development (Fig. 4c).

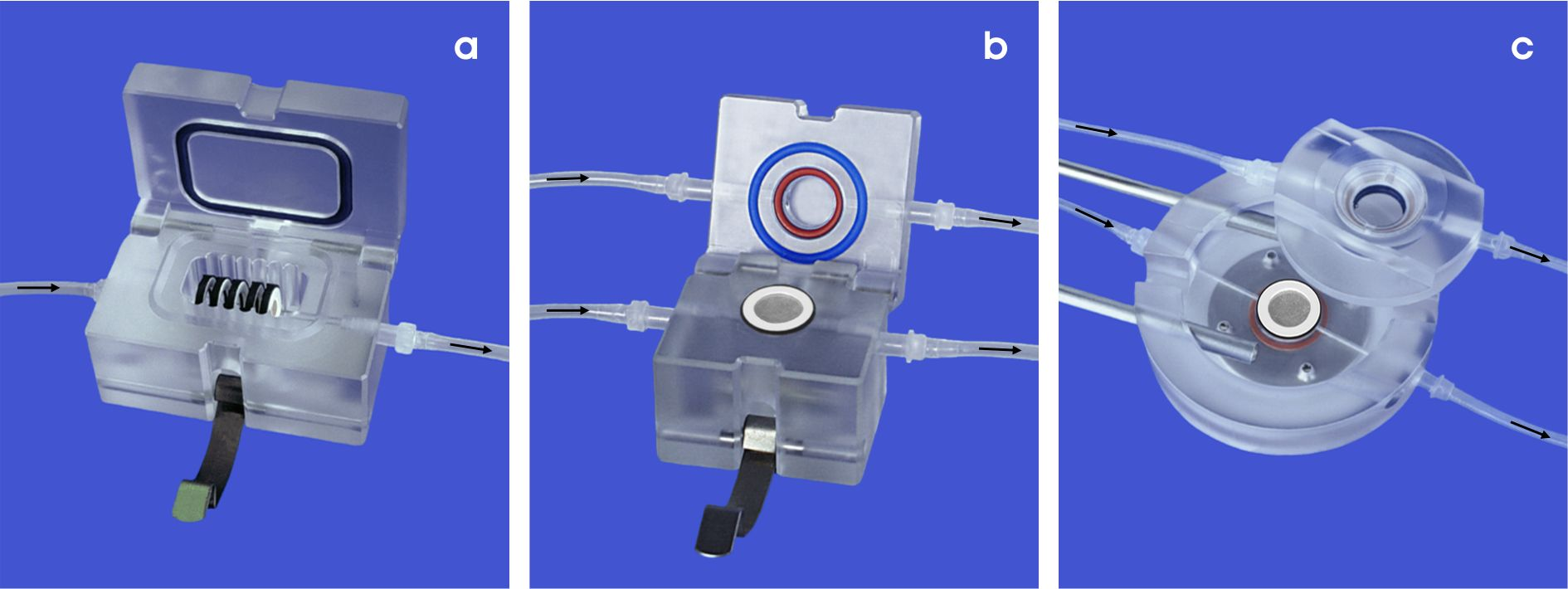
Figure 4: Use of a Minusheet tissue carrier in perfusion culture containers. (a) A standard perfusion culture container holds six tissue carriers to provide them with always fresh medium. (b) In a gradient perfusion culture container an epithelium is exposed to different fluids at the luminal and basal side. (c) In a microscope container a transparent lid and base allow observation of developing tissue during perfusion culture.

In addition, a perfusion culture container can exhibit a flexible silicone lid. Applying force to this lid by an eccentric rotor simulates a mechanical load as required in cartilage and bone tissue engineering. Shaped tissues such as an auricle or different forms of cartilage can be generated with individual scaffolds in a special tissue engineering container. Finally, the spatial extension of tubules derived from renal stem/progenitor cells is obtained within a perfusion container filled with an artificial interstitium made of polyester fleece. Finally, all of these containers are machined out of a special polycarbonate (Makrolon®) so that all of them can be autoclaved for multiple uses.

== Performance of perfusion culture experiments ==
To maintain the necessary temperature of 37 °C within a perfusion culture container, a heating plate (MEDAX-Nagel, Kiel, Germany) and a cover lid (not shown) are used during the performance of culture experiments over weeks (Fig. 5, 7). The transport of culture medium is best accomplished using a slowly rotating peristaltic pump (ISMATEC, IPC N8, Wertheim, Germany). It can to deliver adjustable and exact pump rates between 0.1 and 5 mL per hour.

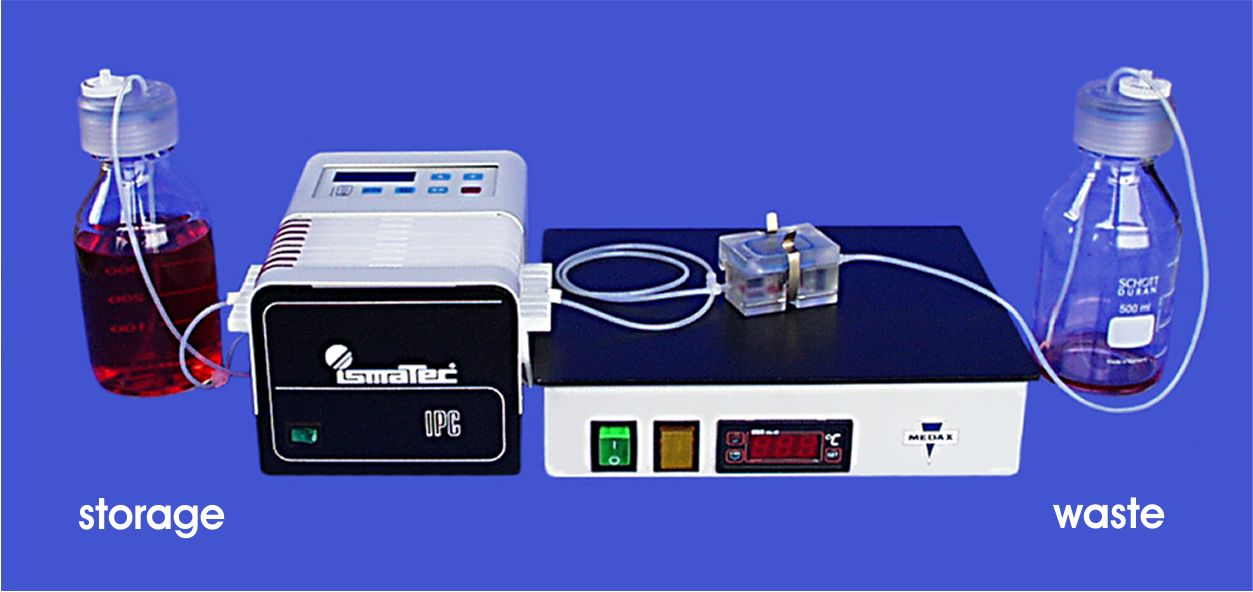
Figure 5: The perfusion culture set-up is working on a laboratory table. A thermal plate maintains the desired temperature of 37°C. During culture, a peristaltic pump transports the medium, for example, with 1.25 mL/h from a storage bottle (left side) to the waste bottle (right side).

On the passage from the storage bottle through the perfusion culture container medium is transported along a mounted tissue carrier to provide contained cells. The exact geometrical placement of the tissue carrier within a perfusion culture container guarantees during transport of medium provision with always fresh nutrition and respiratory gas from all sides. At the same time, it prevents an unphysiological accumulation of metabolic products and an overshoot of paracrine factors. To maintain for the whole culture period in this controlled environment, the metabolized medium is collected in a separate waste bottle. In consequence, the medium is not recirculated.

== Stabilization of pH during perfusion culture ==
Normally cell culture experiments are performed in a CO_{2} incubator. Also, perfusion culture experiments can be performed in such an atmosphere. However, a much better solution is the performance of perfusion culture experiments under atmospheric air on a laboratory table, since it facilitates the complete handling. However, in this case, the culture medium has to be adjusted to atmospheric air. Keeping media in a 5% CO_{2} atmosphere within an incubator always a relatively high amount of NaHCO_{3} is contained to maintain a constant pH between 7.2 and 7.4. If such a formulated medium is used for perfusion culture outside a CO_{2} incubator, the pH will shift from the physiological range to much more alkaline values due to the low content of CO_{2} (0.3%) in atmospheric air. For that reason, any medium used for perfusion culture outside a CO_{2} incubator has to be stabilized by reducing the NaHCO_{3} concentration and/or by adding biological buffers such as HEPES (GIBCO/Invitrogen, Karlsruhe, Germany) or BUFFER ALL (Sigma-Aldrich-Chemie, München, Germany). The necessary amount can be easily determined by admixing increasing amounts of biological buffer solution to an aliquot of medium. Then the medium must equilibrate overnight on a thermo plate at 37°C under atmospheric air. For example, the application of 50 mmol/L HEPES or an equivalent of BUFFER ALL (ca. 1%) to IMDM (Iscove’s Modified Dulbecco’s Medium, GIBCO/Invitrogen) will maintain a constant pH of 7.4 throughout long-term perfusion culture under atmospheric air on a laboratory table.

== Availability of oxygen in medium ==
To obtain in a perfusion culture experiment a high saturation of O_{2} a selected medium such as IMDM has to be transported through a gas permeable silicone tube. The use of a silicone tube provides a large surface for gas exchange by diffusion due to a thin wall (1 mm), a small inner diameter (1 mm) and its extended length (1 m). For example, analysis of IMDM (3024 mg/L NaHCO_{3}, 50 mmol/L HEPES) equilibrated against atmospheric air during a standard perfusion culture experiment shows constant partial pressures of at least 160 mmHg O_{2}.

== Modulation of oxygen content ==
It has been shown that growing cells and tissues have very individual oxygen requirements. Due to this reason, it is important that the content of oxygen can be adapted in individual perfusion culture experiments. The technical solution is a gas exchanger module containing a gas inlet and outlet (Fig. 6a). Further a spiral with a long thin-walled silicon tube for medium transport is mounted inside the module. Since the tube is highly gas-permeable, it guarantees optimal diffusion of gases between the culture medium and the internal atmosphere of the gas exchange module. In consequence, the desired gas atmosphere can be adjusted by a constant flow of a specific gas mixture through the module. This way the content of oxygen or any other gases can be modulated in the medium by diffusion. Applying this simple protocol it became possible to decrease the oxygen partial pressure within the transported medium during long-term culture experiments under absolutely sterile conditions.

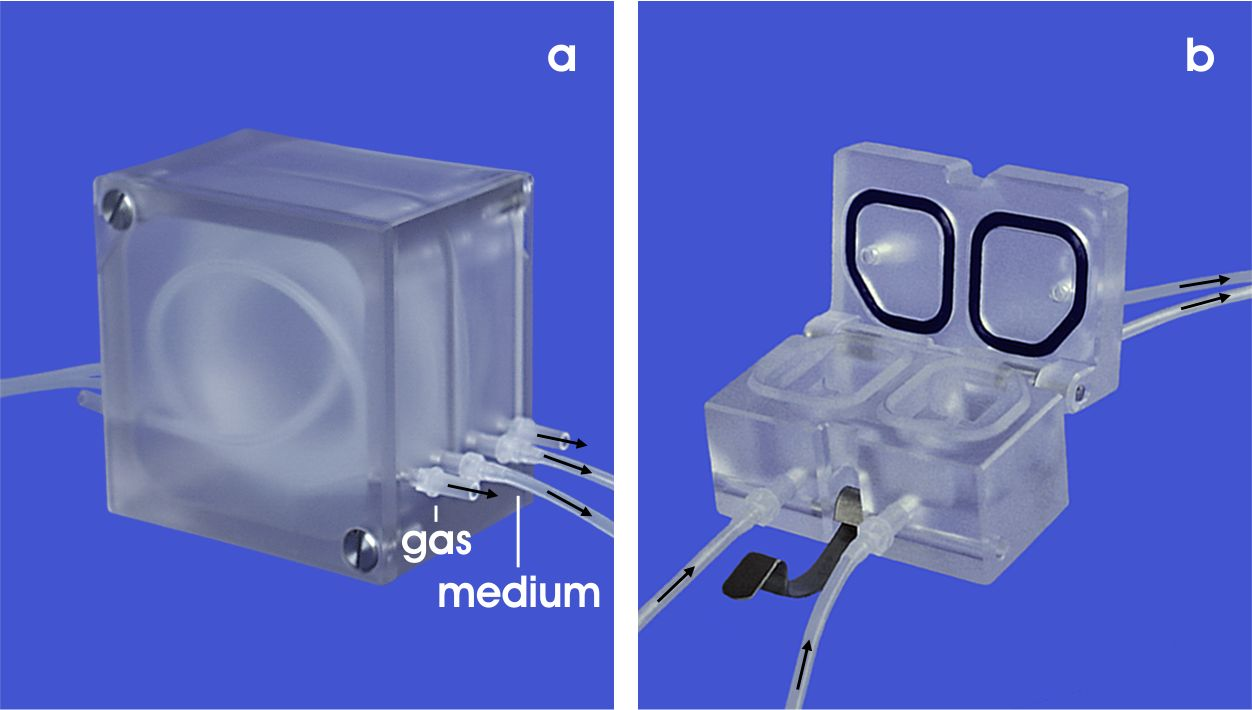
Figure 6: Gas exchange and gas expander module for perfusion culture. (a) A gas exchange module is used when the adaptation of respiratory gas in perfusion culture has to be performed. The desired gas composition is transported to a spiral of silicone tube containing the culture medium by a gas inlet and outlet. Between the walls of the silicone tube, gas is exchanged. (b) A gas expander module is used for the elimination of gas bubbles during the transport of the culture medium. Medium with gas bubbles is entering the inlet and has to pass a barrier. Here, the medium expands, and bubbles are separated. Finally, medium leaves the container bubble-free but gas-saturated.

== Elimination of harmful gas bubbles ==
Performing perfusion culture experiments it always has to be considered that gas bubbles are forming during slow transport of culture medium. They arise during suction of medium in the storage bottle, during transport within the tube, during distribution within the culture container and during elimination on the way to the waste bottle. Due to unknown reasons gas bubbles accumulate especially at material transitions between tubes, connectors and perfusion containers. First these gas bubbles are so small that they cannot be observed with the human eye, but during ongoing transport of culture medium they increase in size and are able to form an embolus that massively impedes medium flow. Within a culture container gas bubbles are leading to a regional shortage of medium supply and are causing breaks in the fluid continuum so that massive fluid pressure changes result. In a gradient perfusion culture container, where two media are transported at exactly the same speed, embolic effects can lead to pressure differences destroying in turn the contained epithelial barrier [5,9].

To avoid the concentration of gas bubbles within a perfusion culture experiment, a gas expander module was developed (Fig. 6b). This module removes gas bubbles from the medium during transport. When medium is entering the gas expander module, it rises within a small reservoir and expands before it drops down a barrier. During this process gas bubbles are separated from the medium at the top of the gas expander module. In consequence, medium leaving the container is oxygen-saturated but free of gas bubbles [8,9].

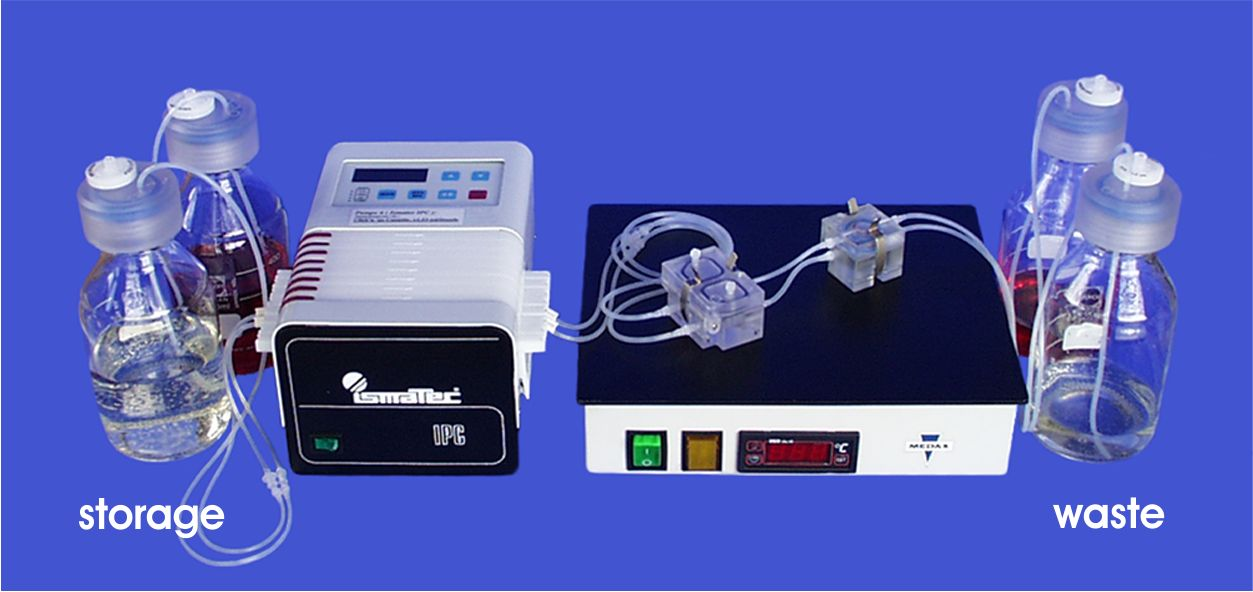
Figure 7: Perfusion culture set-up with an epithelium inside a gradient perfusion culture container. A thermo plate maintains the desired temperature of 37°C. To provide the luminal and basal side of the contained epithelium with nutrition and respiratory gas, two channels of a peristaltic pump transport a red and a clear medium at exactly the same rate of 1.25 mL/h from a storage bottle (left side) to the waste bottle (right side). For elimination of gas bubbles during transport of medium a gas expander module is placed before the gradient container.

== Broad spectrum of applications ==
In the last years, numerous papers were published dealing with the Minusheet perfusion culture system. The wide spectrum illustrates that the modular system was applied to generate specialized tissues in excellent cell biological quality used in tissue engineering, biomaterial research and advanced pharmaceutical drug toxicity testing. A complete list of these applications is found in the data bank ‘Proceedings in perfusion culture’ (see 'External links').

As demonstrated by numerous patents (DE 39 23 279, DE 42 00 446, DE 42 08 805, DE 44 43 902, DE 19530 556, DE 196 48 876 C2, DE 199 52 847 B4, US 5 190 878, US 5 316 945, US 5 665 599, J 2847669, DE 10 2005 002 938, PA 10 2004 054 125.6, PA 10 2005 001 747.9, patents pending) Will W. Minuth has invented the presented Minusheet perfusion culture system.

Numerous pilot experiments with the Minusheet perfusion culture system were performed in the last years by Lucia Denk and Will W. Minuth. The experimental work is presently focusing on the creation of an artificial polyester interstitium to repair injured renal parenchyma.

In 1992 the Minusheet perfusion culture system received the Philip Morris research award ‘Challenge of the Future’ in Munich, Germany. The award was handed over by Henry Kissinger, Hans Joachim Friedrichs and Paul Müller.

To introduce the Minusheet perfusion culture system on the market, Katharina Lorenz-Minuth founded non-profit-orientated Minucells and Minutissue Vertriebs GmbH (D-93077 Bad Abbach/Germany).
