= Kretscham =

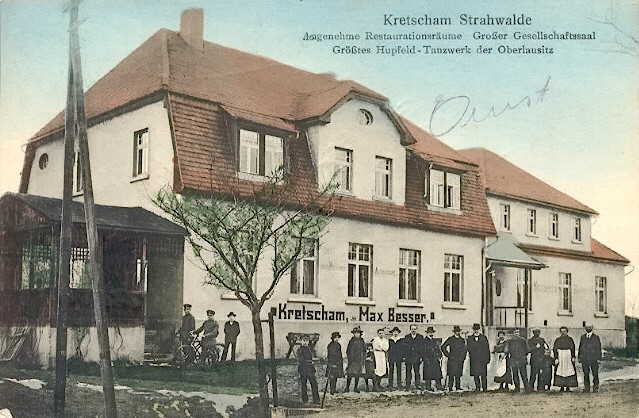
Historical postcard of the former village pub Kretscham Max Besser in Strahwalde in Upper Lusatia (c. 1901)

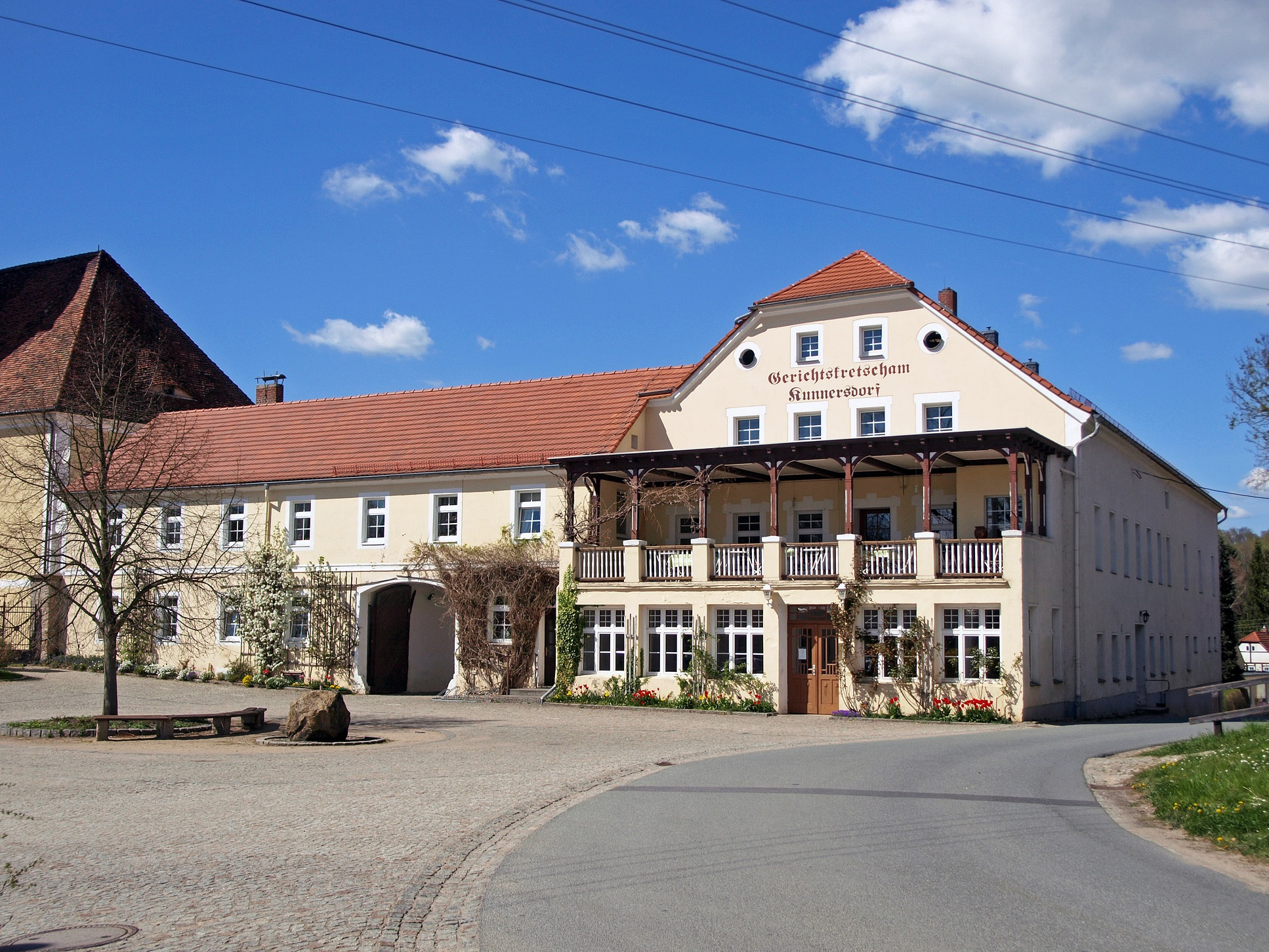
Gerichtskretscham in Kunnersdorf

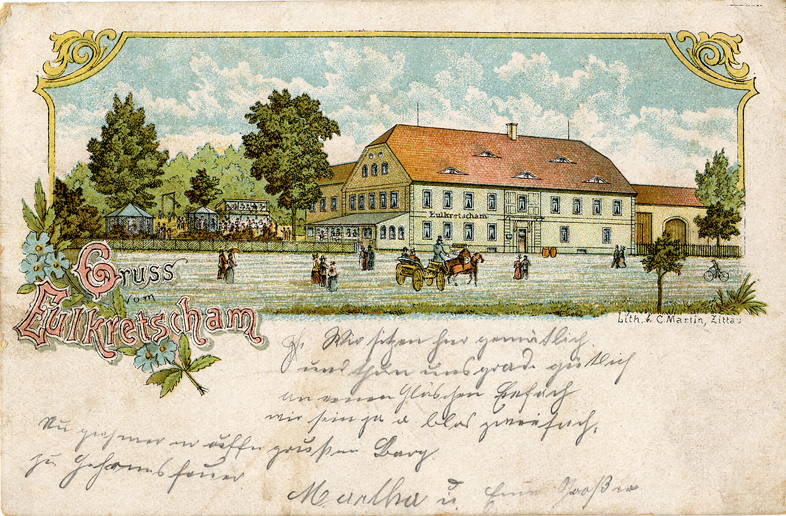
Eulkretscham in Euldorf (c. 1900)

A Kretscham is a village pub (also Gasthaus or Schänke), which was often the seat of the mayor and the place of jurisdiction of the village court (Gerichtskretscham). Most of the time the lokators were given this right.

== Etymology and names ==
The word Kretscham is German and borrowed from the (reconstructed) Old Sorbian word krč’ma "tavern", "pub" (cf. Sorbian korčma, Polish: karczma, Czech: krčma, Slovak: krčma, Hungarian: kocsma, Romanian cârciumă, Rusyn: корчма, Ukrainian: корчма, Russian: корчма, Late-Middle High German: kretscheme, Upper Lusatian language Kraatschn, Silesian: Kratschem).

== Background ==
The term Kretscham for a village pub is still common in Upper Lusatia today and was also very common in the Prussian Province of Silesia. The associated publican is known as the Kretzschmar, plural Kretzschmarn. The surnames Kretschmar, Kretschmer and Kretschmann are derived from this occupation. Places with Kretscham as a component of the name include:

- Dreikretscham
- Kretscham-Rothensehma
- Kieferkretscham
- Peiskretscham
- Wasserkretscham
- Kretscham (Krčma), an abandoned village near Domašín
- Hochkretscham (Wódka), a village in Gmina Branice
- Kretschen (Krčma), a village near Strážek
- Herrnskretschen (Hřensko), a village in Děčín District

== Literature ==
- Kretscham. In: Jacob Grimm, Wilhelm Grimm (eds.): Deutsches Wörterbuch. Vol. 11: K – (V). S. Hirzel, Leipzig 1873 (woerterbuchnetz.de).
