= Kretschmann =

Kretschmann is a German occupational surname literally meaning "innkeeper" associated with the term Kretscham for village inn. Notable people with the surname include:

- Charlotte Kretschmann (1909–2024), German supercententarian
- Erich Kretschmann, German physicist
- Johannes Kretschmann (born 1978), German politician
- Steffen Kretschmann, German boxer
- Thomas Kretschmann, German actor
- Winfried Kretschmann (born 1948), German politician, Minister-President of Baden-Württemberg (2011–2026)

== See also ==
- Kretschmann cabinet (disambiguation), three governments of the German state of Baden-Württemberg (2011–2026)
- Kretschmann scalar, a quadratic scalar invariant in the theory of Lorentzian manifolds
