= Kreczmar =

Kreczmar (masculine), Krechmarowa (archaic feminine) is a Polish-language occupational surname. It is a Polonized form of Kretschmar. Notable people with the surname include:

- Adam Kreczmar (1944–1982) – poet, comedian, Polish cabaret actor
- Jan Kreczmar (1908–1972) Polish actor and educator
- Jerzy Kreczmar (1902–1985), Polish actor and stage director
- Justyna Kreczmarowa (1918–2008), Polish actress and educator
