= Daniel Kretschmar =

German journalist

Daniel Kretschmar (born 1976 in Rostock) is a German journalist.

Kretschmar is a former editor for digital society at the newspaper taz. His previous roles at taz included editor-for-social-movements in the Berlin section, editor-in-chief and head of the online editorial department. He works on various socio-political topics and internet policy. In 2017, he and two colleagues received the Otto Brenner Prize for critical journalism for a multimedia project on European refugee policy.
