= Marlene Kretschmer =

German statistician and climatologist

Marlene Kretschmer is a German statistician and climatologist whose research concerns causal inference and its application to climate change, making connections between climate statistics and climate dynamics. She is a junior professor in the Institute for Meteorology of the Leipzig University Faculty of Physics and Earth System Sciences.

== Education and career ==
Kretschmer earned a diploma from the Humboldt University of Berlin in 2014, with a diploma thesis in pure mathematics related to the Quillen–Suslin theorem. She continued her studies at the University of Potsdam in the Potsdam Institute for Climate Impact Research, completing her doctorate (Dr. rer. nat.) in 2018. Her dissertation was Disentangling the causal drivers of the stratospheric polar vortex: A machine learning approach.

After another year as a postdoctoral researcher at the Potsdam Institute for Climate Impact Research, she continued her research from 2019 to 2022 at the University of Reading in England. She took her current position, as Junior Professor for Climate Causality at Leipzig University, in 2023. She retains an affiliation with the University of Reading as senior visiting fellow.

== Recognition ==
Kretschmer received the 2018 Wladimir Peter Köppen Prize, an annual prize for the best German dissertation in integrated climate system analysis and prediction, awarded by the University of Hamburg.

She received the 2022 Division Outstanding Early Career Scientist Award of the European Geosciences Union Climate: Past, Present, and Future Division, "for outstanding development and the application of statistical methods to the study of causality in climate dynamics".
