= Kretschmar =

Kretschmar is a German occupational surname literally meaning "innkeeper" associated with the term Kretscham for village inn. It comes from Middle High German kretschmar, which was borrowed from Slavic languages, e.g. Czech krčmář. Notable people with the surname include:

- Daniel Kretschmar (born 1976), German journalist
- Gerhard Kretschmar (1939–1939), German eugenics victim
- Helmut Kretschmar (born 1928), German classical tenor
- William Kretschmar (1933–2017), American politician

== Fictional characters ==
- Theo Kretschmar-Schuldorff a fictional character in the 1942 film The Life and Death of Colonel Blimp
