= Tension ring =

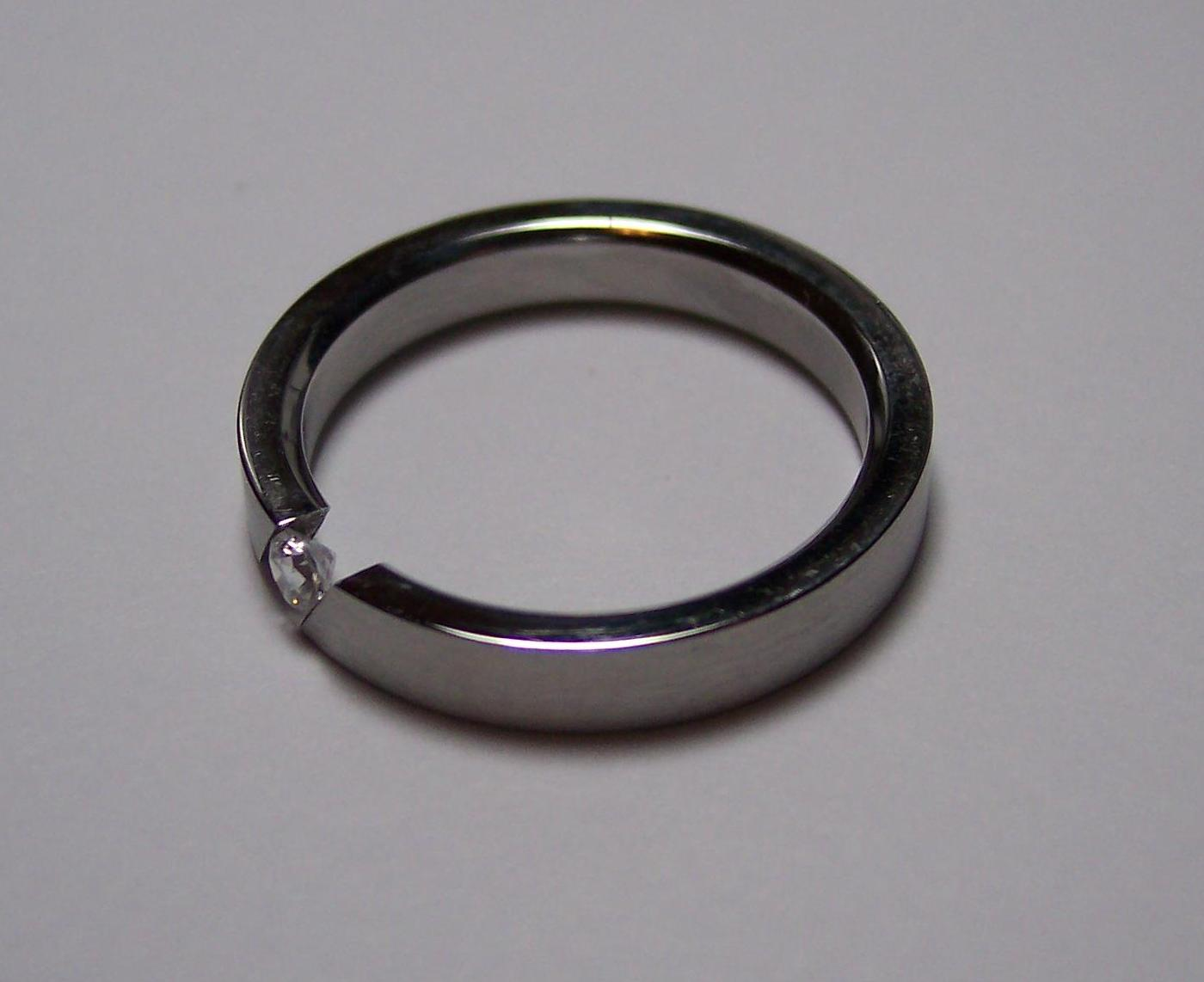
Tension ring

A tension ring is a type of finger ring that holds a gemstone in place by pressure rather than prongs, a bezel, or other mounting. The metal setting is actually spring-loaded to exert pressure onto the gemstone, and tiny etchings or grooves in the metal create a shelf that supports the gemstone's edges. The gemstone appears to be suspended in the air with nothing holding it in place.

== Characteristics ==
A major difference between tension settings and other settings is that tension settings are manufactured only after they are sold while other settings are often manufactured first and then sold to consumers. There are several reasons for this difference. First, tension settings can not be resized easily, as resizing removes the spring-loading effect. In some designs, they can be resized up or down up to two sizes. Sometimes, instead of resizing a tension setting, the manufacturer actually melts down the old setting and creates a new spring-loaded tension setting that is appropriately sized. Second, tension settings are calibrated to the exact specifications of the stone that they hold, therefore they cannot be manufactured until the customer has selected a gem. Unlike other settings, which can be manufactured ahead of time regardless of the stone they ultimately hold, each tension setting is designed for a specific stone. The tension setting is calibrated by a computer, using light to identify the exact places the mount must apply pressure on the gemstone to avoid fracturing it through uneven pressure distribution.

Because tension settings place such pressure on the stone, only four types of gemstone can be placed in a tension setting safely: diamonds, rubies, moissanite, and sapphires. Additionally, tension setting manufacturers must be careful which stones they place in tension settings. A stone that either has significant inclusions or is too soft may fracture under the intense pressure of the setting. The Mohs scale is a reliable way to rank a gem's hardness. Generally gems with a Mohs hardness of less than 9.0 are not suitable for tension mounting.

The term "tension setting" is, from the physical science perspective, a misnomer. The stone is not held in tension (a pulling force) but in fact in compression (a pressing force).

== Technical information ==
A tension ring is a robust assembly, generally exerting around 12,000 pounds per square inch of pressure. To make a tension setting, the manufacturer must harden the metal, use special alloys, and pressure treat the metal to create the strength required for the spring-loaded structure. The jeweler cold-works and hardens the metal before setting the gem.

Some tension rings exert up to 50,000 psi (350 MPa) on the diamond. It is not possible to exert so great a pressure on a stone with a Mohs scale of mineral hardness rating of less than 9.0. Furthermore, to exert this pressure on a gem, particularly one of high importance, the maker must ensure even pressure distribution. This requires careful calculation, and inspection of the gem to ensure that every facet mates perfectly with the ring.

Tension rings are also manufactured using other metals, particularly those that are naturally strong, such as titanium or stainless steel. These materials do not require special alloying or manufacturing processes for the creation of a tension ring. In these cases, a stone can be set as-cast with relative ease. These materials are usually used for "fashion" jewelry, and are set with small diamonds or semi-precious gems such as topaz or tourmaline. However, there is a growing group of artists using titanium to produce high value handmade tension rings

== Tension setting security debate ==
There are conflicting perspectives regarding the security of tension settings. Many jewelers contend that tension settings are as safe and potentially safer than four and six prong settings, but there are others who contend that prongs are stronger. The reality is that both ring designs have weaknesses that are unique to their engineering process. Prongs can snag on clothes and other loose objects, and they weaken with time and usage. As a result, prongs must be repaired or replaced periodically. On the other hand, tension settings do not lose their spring-loading over time, so the stone does not fall out as a result of the setting weakening. Critics do contend that a stone can potentially be dislodged from a tension setting if it is hit hard enough or if the setting is damaged to the point where its spring loading is compromised. Tension manufacturers partially agree with this statement, warning their customers that stones can be lost if the setting suffers a blunt force impact that damages the spring-loading, but they also point out that no stone has ever been lost as a result of a manufacturing defect. There is a risk that the setting can be compromised by a high impact. This, however, is also true of prong settings, and cases of prongs failing and stones falling out are common. Tension settings on the other hand do not need to be replaced, and unless the spring-loading is damaged, are unlikely to lose a gem stone.

== History ==
The first tension ring, called the Niessing Spannring, was created in 1979 by the German company Niessing. However, the general concept of tension settings has been around for over 40 years as it was developed in the late 1960s by a Niessing employee named Friedrich Becker.

The original Niessing tension ring was constructed out of 18 karat gold (75% pure gold and 25% other alloying metals) and weighed 35 grams. The alloys in the 18 karat blend were non traditional jewelry metals, used to give the ring much greater strength than normal. In 1987, Steven Kretchmer patented a proprietary platinum alloy called "Plat/SK". This has since been licensed to other companies, for example Hoover & Strong, who require a super hard platinum alloy for jewelry such as tension set rings. Steven Kretchmer's advancements in the alloying of metals allowed the modern day tension ring to lose much of its weight without sacrificing strength.

Currently, Steven Kretchmer holds two patents (5,084,108 and 5,188,679) for the tension-set ring. Patent 5,084,108, issued January 28, 1992, is for a method for forming metal compression-spring gemstone mounting. Patent 5,188,679 is for the actual metal compression-spring gemstone mounting, i.e., the outcome of the method patented by Kretchmer. The first online retail jeweler, for Steven Kretchmer's tension set rings, was Pearlman's Jewelers.

== See also ==
- Tiffany mount
