= Adasse (money lender) =

German creditor

- Occupation: Creditor
- Years active: c.1348
- Era: 14th century

Adasse (fl. 1348) was a Jewish money lender from Görlitz, modern-day Germany, who was granted citizenship of the town c. 1348.

It was rare for either a woman or someone who was Jewish to be granted citizens rights in the fourteenth century; the fact that Adasse was both means she is a significant figure. She gained notoriety in the town as a creditor, lending money to members of the Christian community in particular. At the time of her citizenship, she was the owner of a promissory note for 71 marks. Although a citizen, Adasse would still have been excluded from council elections.
