= Görlitz =

Town in Saxony, Germany

Görlitz Gerlz, Gerltz, Gerltsch (East Lusatian)
- Town
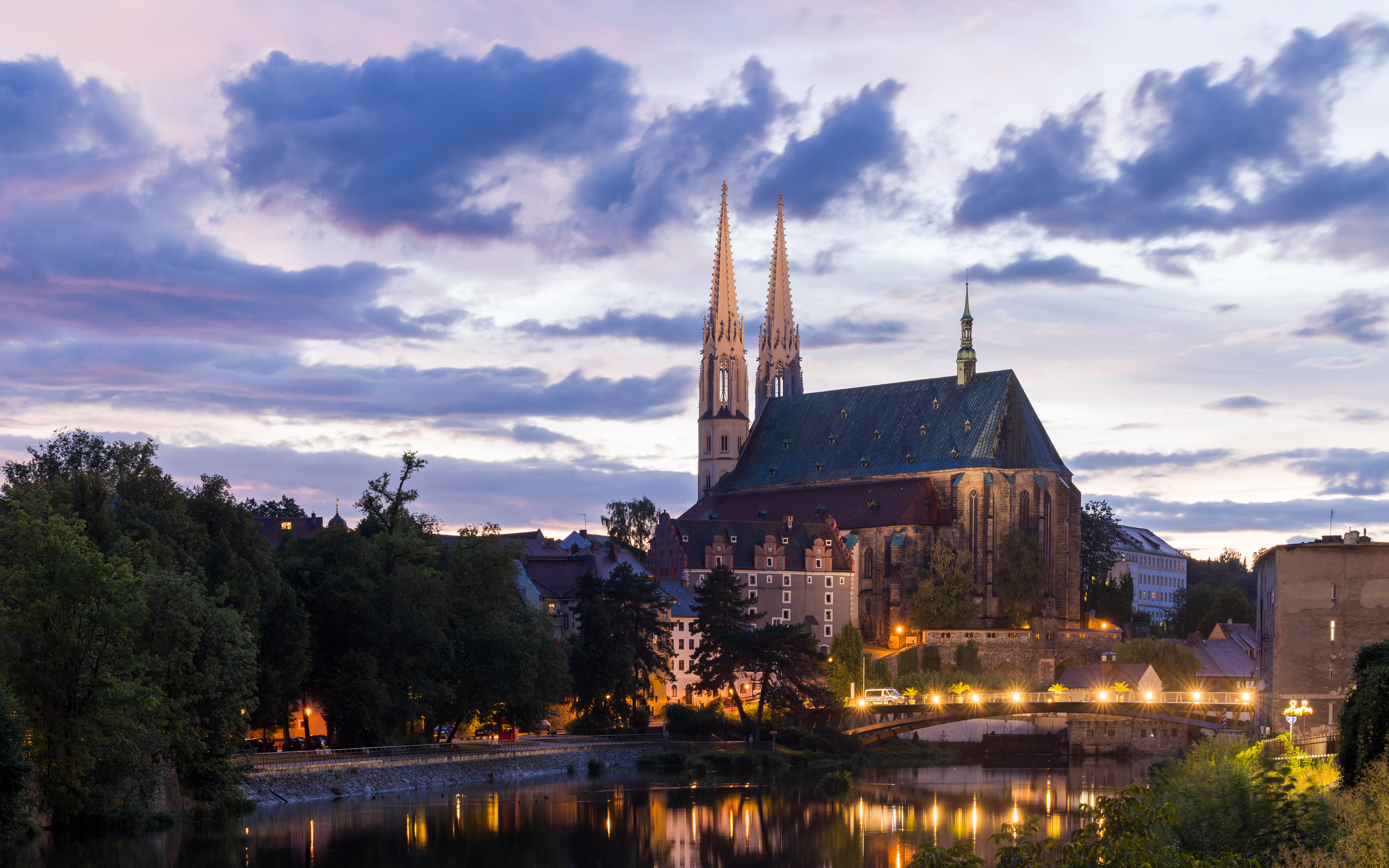
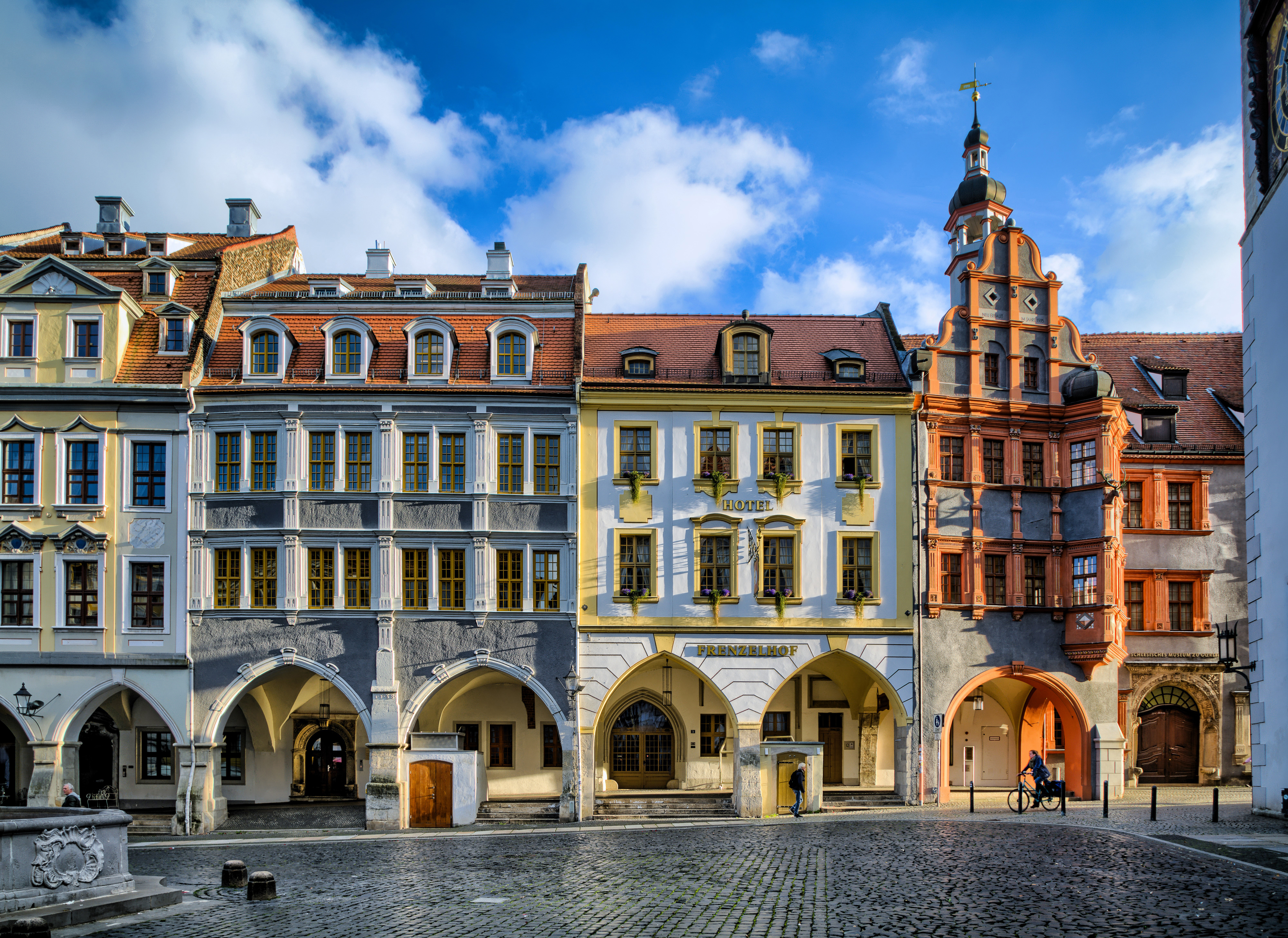
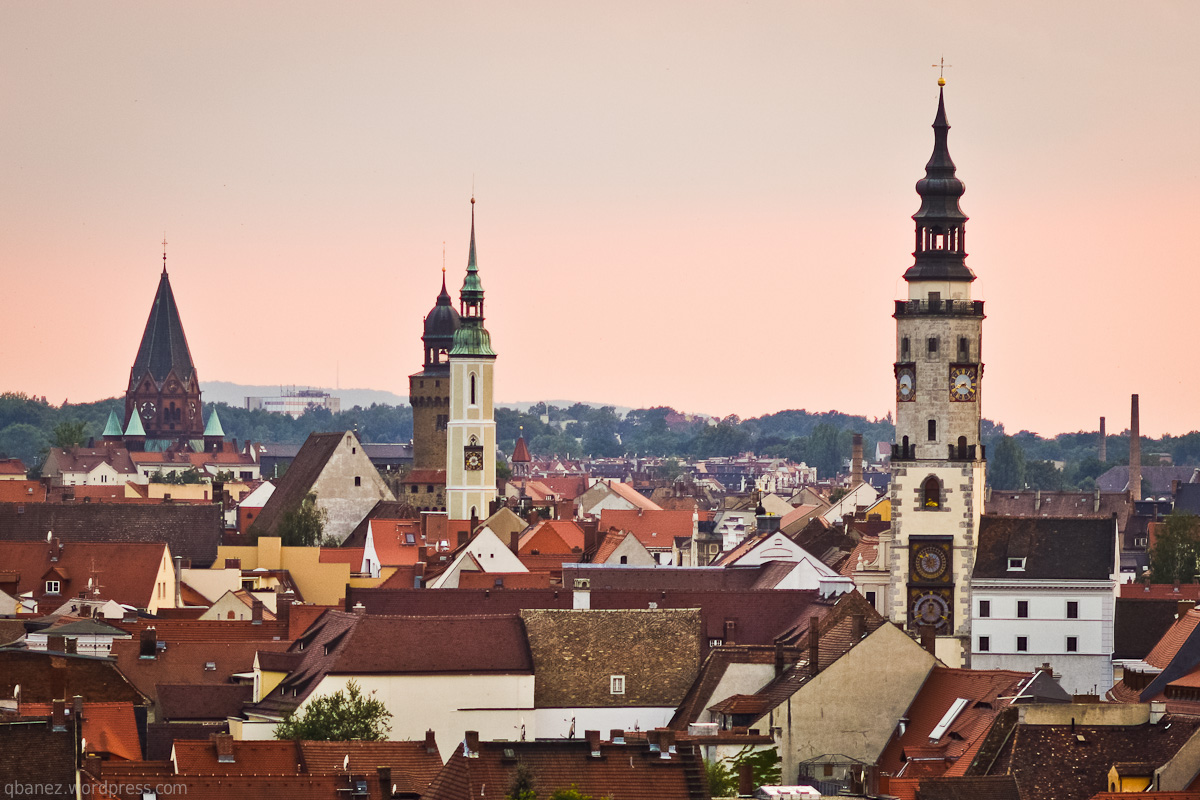
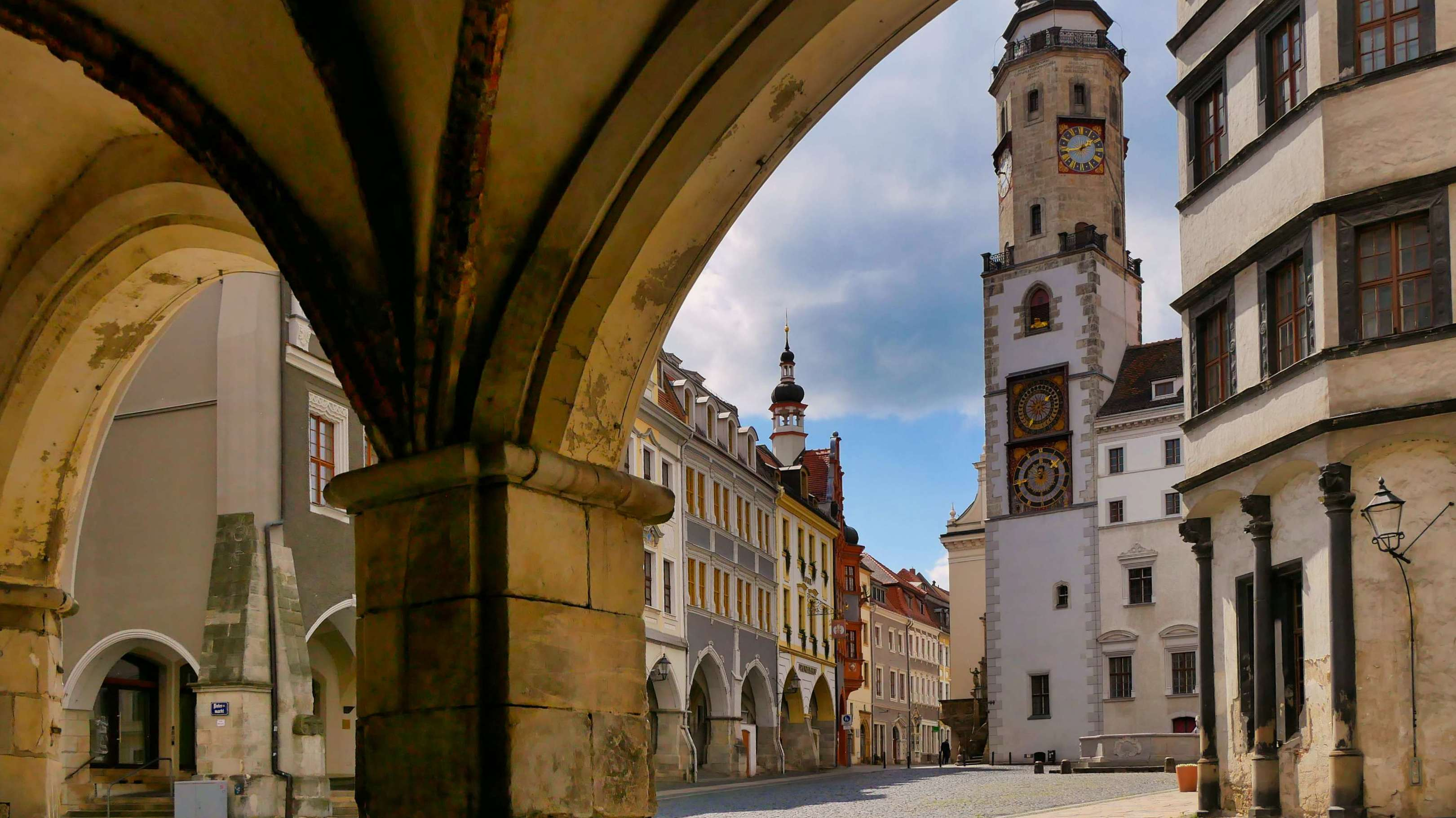
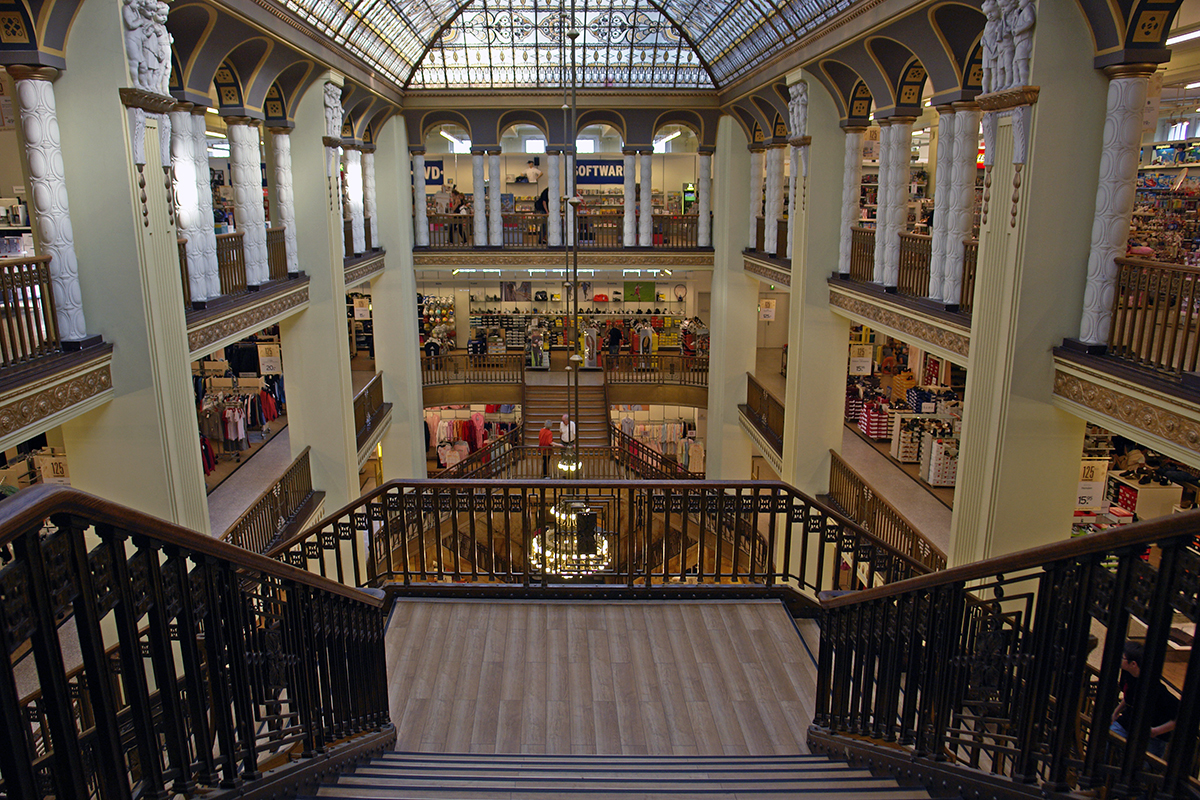
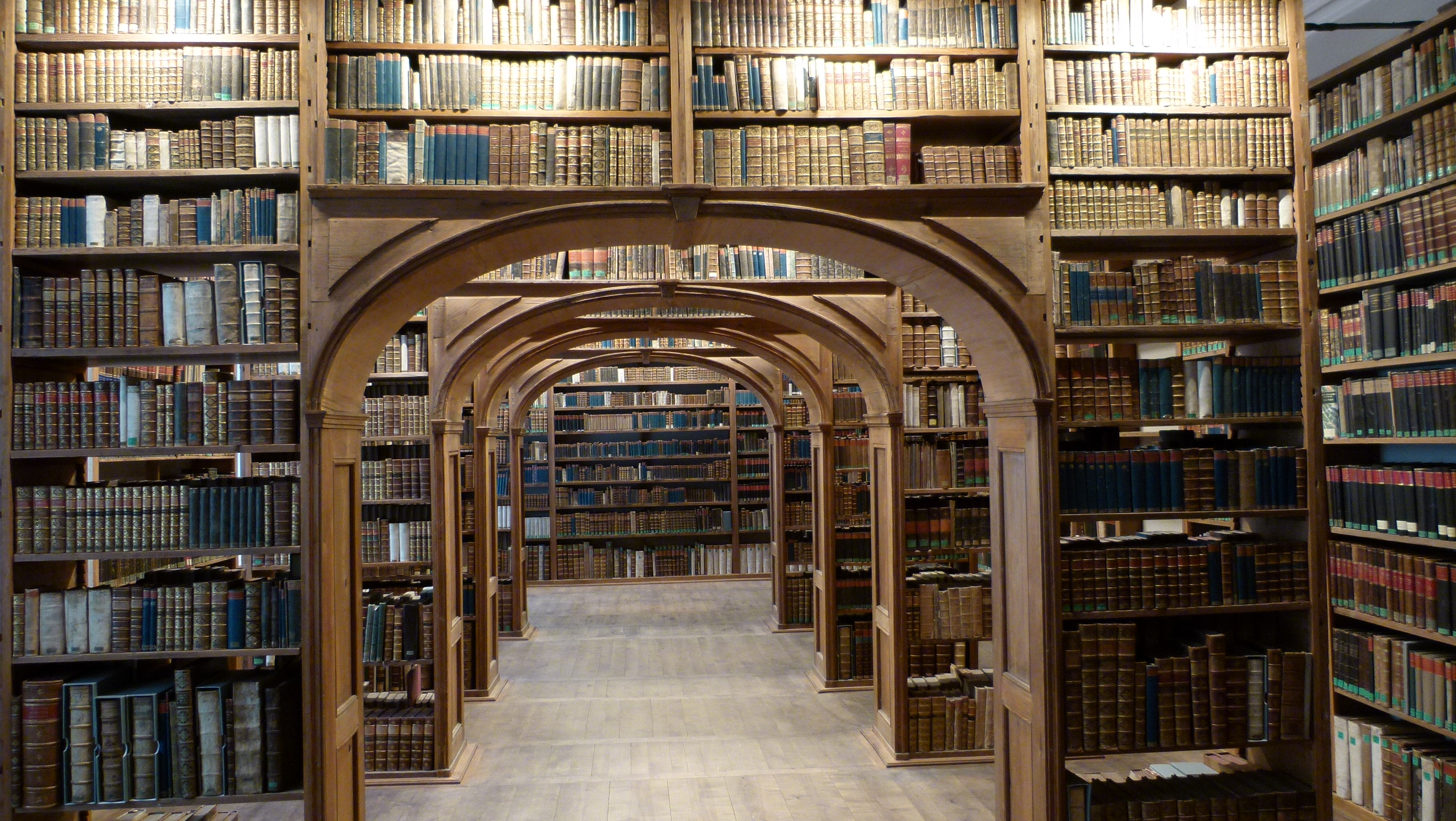
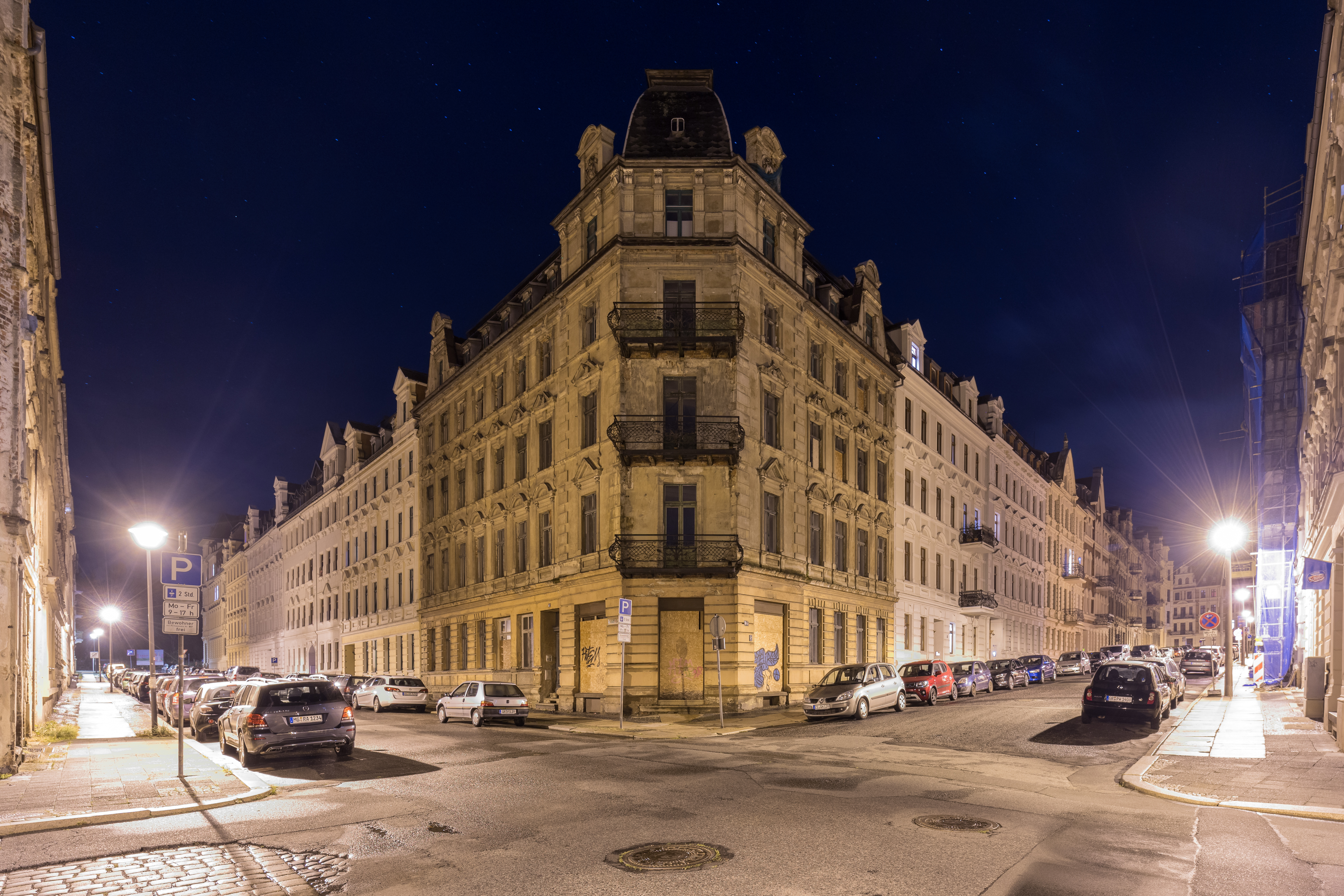
- Sts. Peter and Paul Church and Lusatian Neisse Lower Market Square Towers of Görlitz Town hall Department Store Upper Lusatian Library of Sciences Gründerzeit streets of Görlitz

- Flag Coat of arms

- Location of Görlitz within Görlitz district
- Interactive map of Görlitz
- Location within Germany Location within Saxony
- Coordinates: 51°09′10″N 14°59′14″E
- Country: Germany
- State: Saxony
- District: Görlitz
- Subdivisions: 9 town- and 8 village-quarters

Government
  - Mayor (2019–26): Octavian Ursu (CDU)

Area
  - Total: 67.52 km^{2} (26.07 sq mi)
- Elevation: 199 m (653 ft)

Population (2025-12-31)
  - Total: 55,065
  - Density: 815.5/km^{2} (2,112/sq mi)
- Time zone: UTC+01:00 (CET)
  - Summer (DST): UTC+02:00 (CEST)
- Postal codes: 02826–02828
- Dialling codes: 03581
- Vehicle registration: GR
- Website: www.goerlitz.de

Görlitz ([ˈɡœʁlɪts]; East Lusatian: Gerlz, Gerltz, Gerltsch; Upper Sorbian: Zhorjelc [ˈzhɔʁʲɛlts]) is a town in Saxony, Germany. It is on the river Lusatian Neisse and is the largest town in Upper Lusatia, the second-largest town in the region of Lusatia after Cottbus, and the largest town in the German part of the region of Silesia. Görlitz is the easternmost town (Note: The easternmost village being Zentendorf.) in Germany and lies opposite the Polish town of Zgorzelec, which was the eastern part of Görlitz until 1945. The town has approximately 56,000 inhabitants, which make Görlitz the sixth-largest town in Saxony. It is the seat of the district of Görlitz. Together with Zgorzelec it forms the Euro City of Görlitz/Zgorzelec, which has a combined population of around 86,000.

Görlitz, first mentioned in 1071, developed as a key trading town on the Via Regia route linking Western and Eastern Europe. In the Late Middle Ages, it prospered through the cloth trade and became a member of the Lusatian League, enjoying considerable autonomy. The town came under Bohemian, Austrian and Saxon rule before becoming part of Prussia in 1815 after the Congress of Vienna. During World War II, Görlitz was spared major destruction, but the new Oder–Neisse line in 1945 divided it from its eastern districts, which became Zgorzelec in Poland. In the GDR era, Görlitz was a border town with limited cross-border contact, but after German reunification and Poland’s EU accession, cooperation with Zgorzelec increased. Today, Görlitz is renowned for its well-preserved historic architecture and frequent use as a film location.

Görlitz is culturally diverse. Immediately to the west of Görlitz lie Sorbian-speaking parts of Lusatia, and Görlitz was founded and first settled by the Sorbs, a Slavic people. This is evidenced by the name of the town and the etymology of some of its surrounding villages and geographical features being of Slavic origin. Görlitz itself speaks the East Lusatian dialect of German (Ostlausitzer Mundart), which is related to Silesian German dialects and differs from the Upper Saxon dialects spoken in most parts of Saxony. It is home to the Schlesisches Himmelreich and Liegnitzer Bombe, a Silesian Museum (Schlesisches Museum zu Görlitz), and the Silesian Christmas Market (Schlesischer Christkindelmarkt).

== History ==
=== Early Middle Ages ===
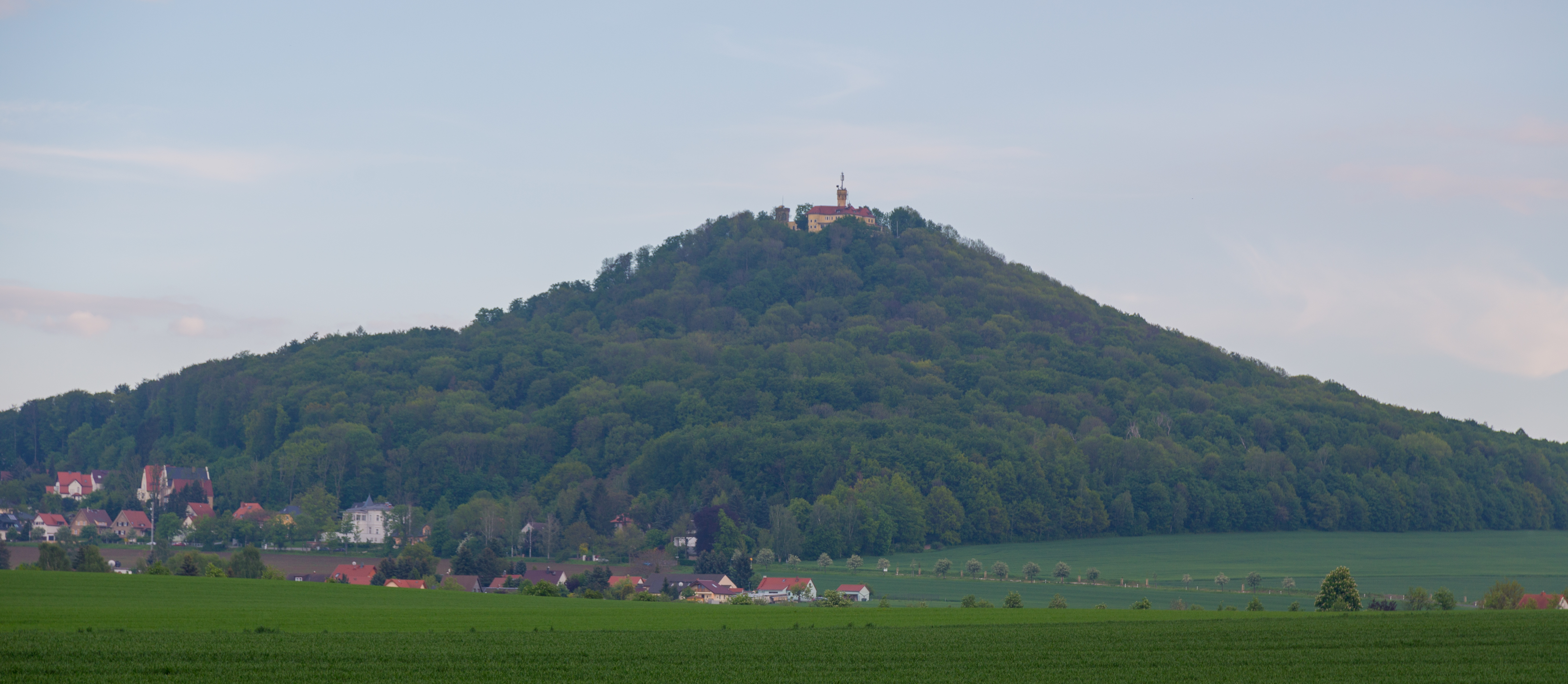
Landeskrone (Sedło), a hill that was the site of the main stronghold of the Slavic Bieżuńczanie tribe in the Early Middle Ages

Slavs migrated into the area during the Early Middle Ages. The nearby Landeskrone (Upper Sorbian: Sedło) mountain, as Businc, is considered the main stronghold of the Bieżuńczanie tribe and Gorelic is said to mean a small village. Other references state the origin of the name Görlitz is the Slavic word for 'burned land', referring to the technique used to clear land for settlement. Polish Zgorzelec and Czech Zhořelec have the same derivation.

In the Early Middle Ages, the area was inhabited by the Bieżuńczanie tribe, one of the old Polish tribes. In the late 9th or 10th century, the Bieżuńczanie were subjugated by the Sorbian Milceni tribe, who bordered from the west, who in turn were subjugated in 990 by the Margraviate of Meissen, a frontier march of the Holy Roman Empire. The area was then conquered by Polish ruler Bolesław I the Brave in 1002 and formed part of Poland until 1031, after which the region fell back to the Margraviate of Meissen.

=== Earliest record and urban formation ===
Görlitz, as Goreliz, was first mentioned in a document from the King of Germany, and later Holy Roman Emperor, Henry IV in 1071. This document granted Görlitz to the religious Diocese of Meissen, then under Bishop Benno of Meissen. This document can now be found in the Saxony State Archives in Dresden. In 1075 the village was assigned to the Duchy of Bohemia. In 1126–1131 Bohemian Duke Soběslav I erected a castle, one of several new castles on the Bohemian-Polish border. It may have been on the site of the present St Peter and Paul church. The date the town was founded is unknown but in the 13th century the village gradually became a town. Owing to its location on the Via Regia, an ancient and medieval trade route, the settlement prospered. In 1319 it became part of the Piast-ruled Duchy of Jawor, and Duke Henry I of Jawor confirmed the town's privileges. In 1329, the town fell back to Bohemia.

From 1346, Görlitz was a wealthy member of the Lusatian League, which consisted of Bautzen, Görlitz, Kamenz, Lubań, Löbau and Zittau. Around 1348 a Jewish woman, Adasse, was made a citizen of the town. In 1352 during the reign of Polish King Casimir III the Great, Lusatian German colonists from Görlitz founded the town of Gorlice in southern Poland near Kraków. From 1377 to 1396 it was the capital of an eponymous duchy. In the conflict over the Bohemian throne between George of Poděbrady and Matthias Corvinus, Görlitz, along with the Lusatian League, recognized Corvinus as ruler between 1469 and 1490.

=== Modern period ===
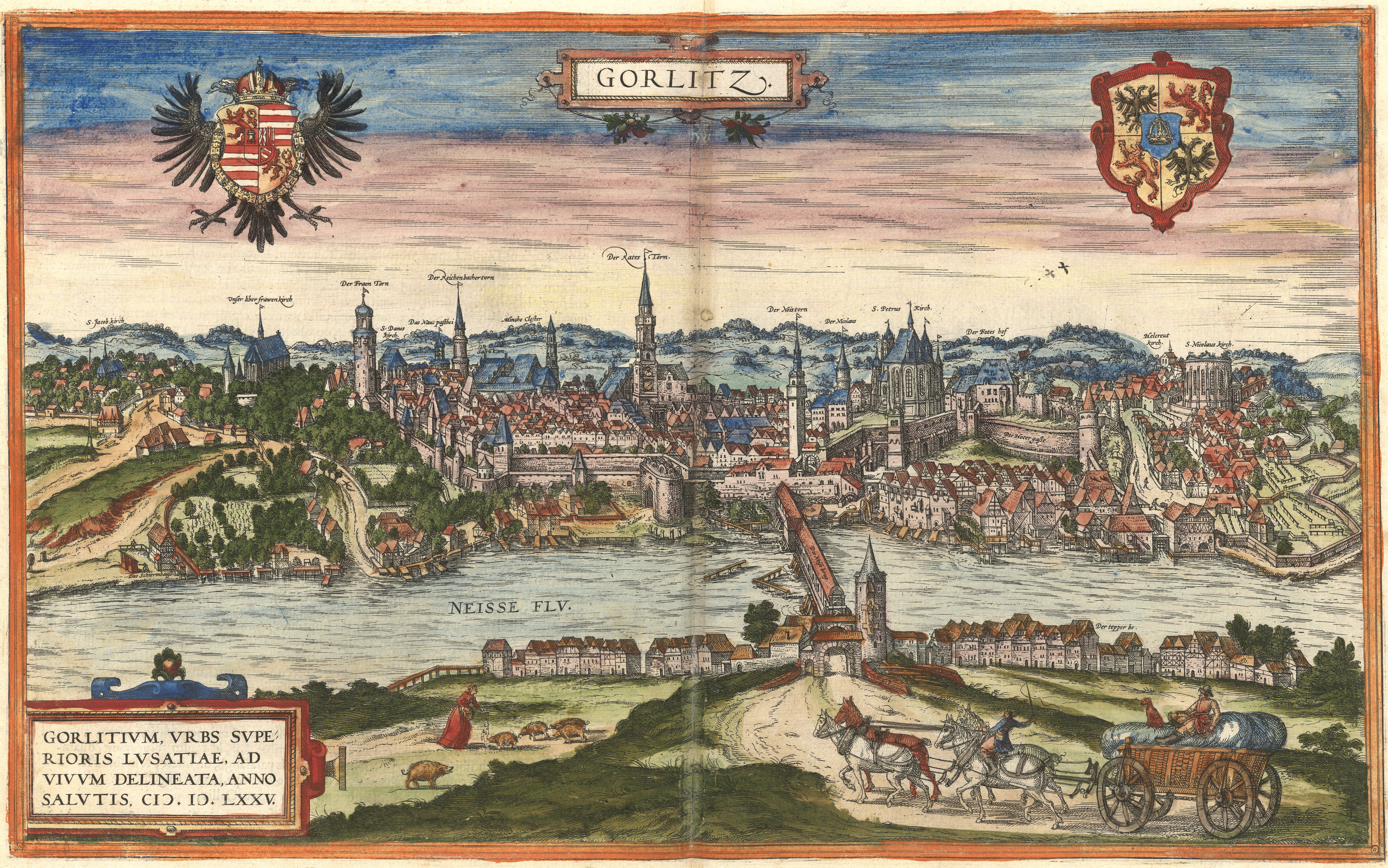
Görlitz in the 16th century

The Protestant Reformation came to Görlitz in the early 1520s and, by the last half of the 16th century, the town and its surrounding area became almost completely Lutheran. In 1547, the town was subjected to the Upper Lusatian Pönfall, a punitive measure imposed by Ferdinand I in his capacity as King of Bohemia after political disobedience during the Schmalkaldic War. As a result, the city lost important privileges, including customs and toll rights, which weakened its economic position.

In 1623, during the Thirty Years' War, the town was captured and occupied alternately by Sweden and the Holy Roman Empire. In 1635, the region of Upper Lusatia (including Görlitz) was ceded to the Electorate of Saxony. From 1639, the town was occupied by Sweden again; it was besieged by Imperial and Saxon forces in 1641. After the war, it was part of the Electorate of Saxony, from 1697 within the Polish–Saxon personal union. One of two main routes connecting Warsaw and Dresden ran through the town in the 18th century and Kings Augustus II the Strong and Augustus III of Poland often travelled that route. Napoleon visited the town several times in 1807, 1812 and 1813.

After the Napoleonic Wars, the 1815 Congress of Vienna transferred the town from the Kingdom of Saxony to the Kingdom of Prussia. Görlitz was subsequently administered within the Province of Silesia and, after World War I, the Province of Lower Silesia, until 1945. During World War I an internment camp for Greek soldiers was located in present-day Zgorzelec, whilst 500 Greek officers lived in private quarters throughout the town. A burial ground for Greek soldiers was located in the local cemetery.

=== Interbellum and World War II ===
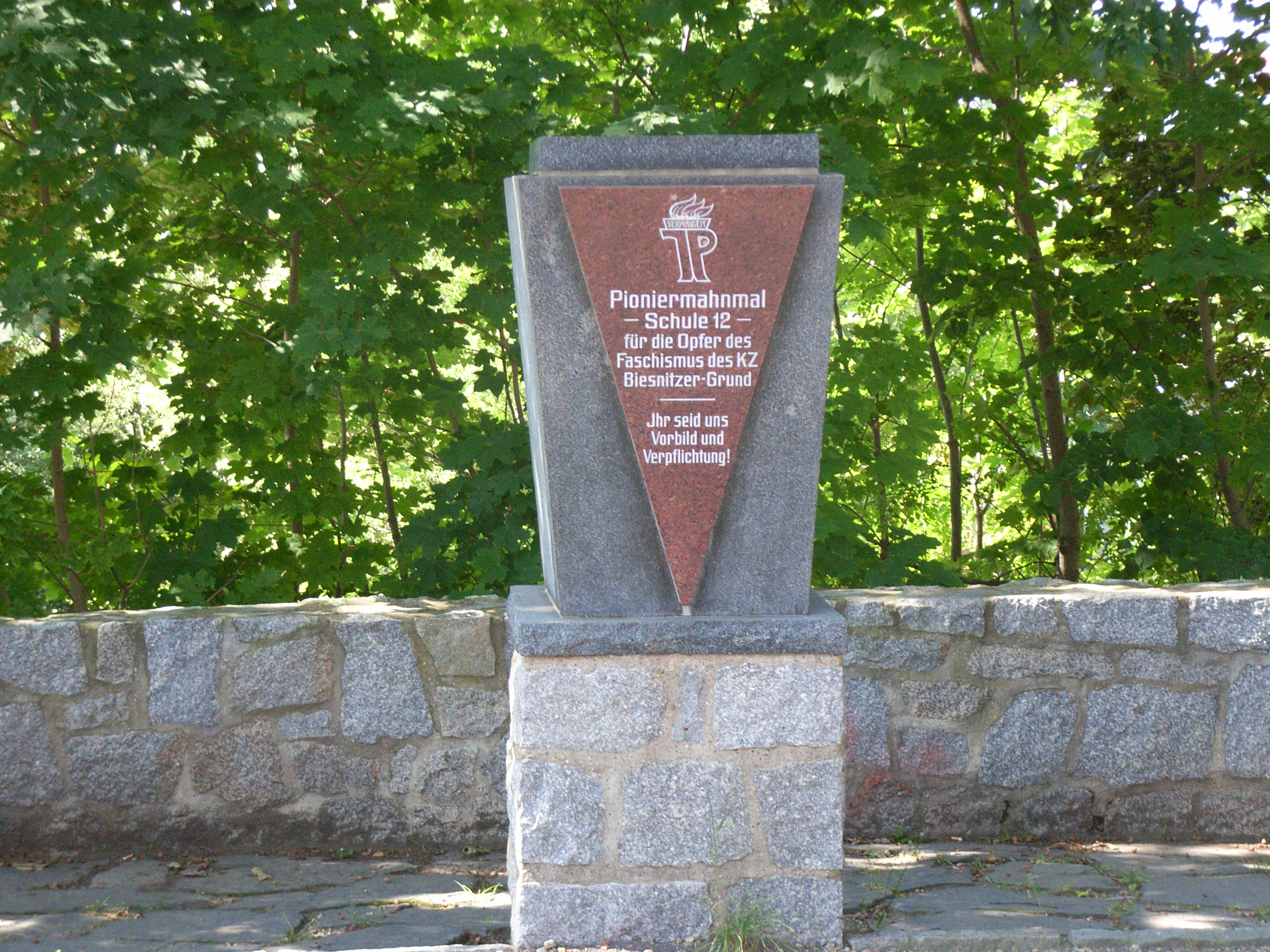
Memorial to the victims of the AL Görlitz subcamp of Gross-Rosen in Biesnitz

Shortly after the Nazi Party's rise to power, in March 1933, the SA established the Leschwitz concentration camp in the present-day district of Weinhübel. Political prisoners were held and tortured in the camp before it was dissolved in August 1933 and the prisoners were deported to other Nazi concentration camps. In 1936, during a nationwide Nazi campaign of changing of placenames, two present-day districts of Görlitz were renamed to erase traces of Slavic origin—Leschwitz to Weinhübel and Nikrisch to Hagenwerder. On Kristallnacht, in November 1938, an arson attack was carried out on the Görlitz Synagogue. The building survived the attack without major damage because firefighters resisted the order not to extinguish the fire. It is the only synagogue in present-day Saxony that survived Nazi rule. In the interwar period most of the Jews had left the city and their number dropped from 567 in 1925 to 134 in 1939. Many remaining Jews were then killed in the Holocaust.

During World War II, a Nazi prison was operated in the town, with four forced labour subcamps within the town limits and three in nearby villages. The Nazis also established and operated two subcamps of the Gross-Rosen concentration camp, located in present-day districts of Biesnitz and Kunnerwitz, in which over 1,500 Jewish men and women were used as forced labour, and 470 of whom died. Numerous subcamps of the Stalag VIII-A prisoner-of-war camp were located in the town, in which over 10,000 POWs worked as forced labour in 1942, and one of the largest subcamps was located in nearby Weinhübel (district of Görlitz since 1949). After the Soviet offensive of 1944 and the partial evacuation of the German court staff from the General Government in German-occupied Poland, a special court of the General Government was established at the local courthouse. Several Polish citizens were detained in Görlitz and sentenced to prison or death at this court for rescuing Jews from the Holocaust. Near the end of World War II German troops destroyed all bridges crossing the Lusatian Neisse.

=== German Democratic Republic and reunited Germany ===
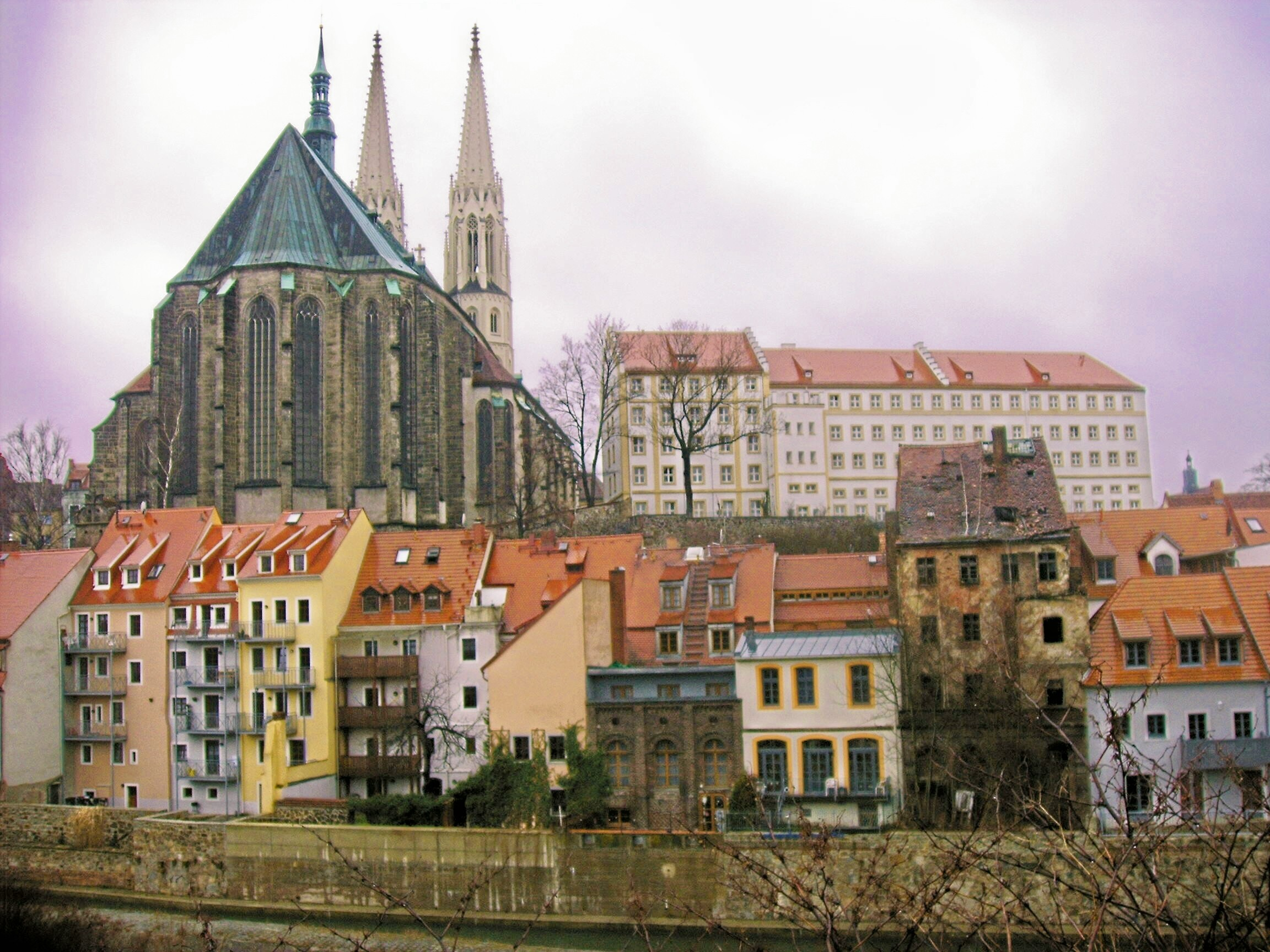
St. Peter and Paul in December 2004

The redrawing of boundaries in 1945—in particular the location of the German-Polish border to the present Oder-Neisse line—divided the town. The right bank was placed under the administration of the Polish People's Republic and was initially renamed Zgorzelice, and then Zgorzelec in 1948, with both names being historically used in the Polish language, while the main portion on the left bank became part of the state of Saxony in the Soviet occupation zone in Germany, from which the German Democratic Republic (GDR) emerged in 1949.

The residents of the part of the town located east of the Neisse River (modern-day Zgorzelec) were almost entirely expelled to the western part of the town. In the 1950s, about 40 percent of the population in and around Görlitz consisted of expellees from the former eastern territories of Germany.

When the East German states were dissolved in 1952 Görlitz became part of the Dresden District, but the states were restored on German reunification in 1990. In 1972 the East German-Polish border was opened for visa-free travel, resulting in intense movement between Görlitz and Zgorzelec, which lasted until 1980, when East Germany unilaterally closed the border because of anti-communist protests and the emergence of the Solidarity movement in Poland. On 27 June 1994 the town became the seat of the Roman Catholic Diocese of Görlitz, but it remains a Lutheran Protestant stronghold. In 2002 Lake Berzdorf, occupying a former open-cast lignite mine south of Görlitz, began to be filled.

The Altstadtbrücke (literally old town bridge) between Görlitz and sister city Zgorzelec was rebuilt between 2003 and 2004. It was officially opened on 20 October 2004. As soon as Poland signed the Schengen Agreement (20 December 2007), movement between the two banks of the river again became unrestricted, since border controls were eliminated. Indeed, users of the new pedestrian bridge are not informed by any signs that they are leaving one country and entering another. Today Görlitz and Zgorzelec are well connected. A bus line connects the German and Polish parts of the town and there is a common urban management, with annual joint sessions of both town councils.

Since reunification and as of 2013, more than 700 buildings in Görlitz have been renovated. It is a popular place for retirement among the elderly of Germany, being quiet and relatively affordable by German standards. Its tourist potential is rapidly expanding since it is very much an eastern counterpart to towns such as Heidelberg. In the case of Görlitz much of the funding for the renovations of the town's buildings has come from an anonymous donor, who, since 1995, has sent an annual donation of more than €500,000, totalling more than €10,000,000.

In 2021, the surviving old synagogue was reopened.

== Arts and culture ==
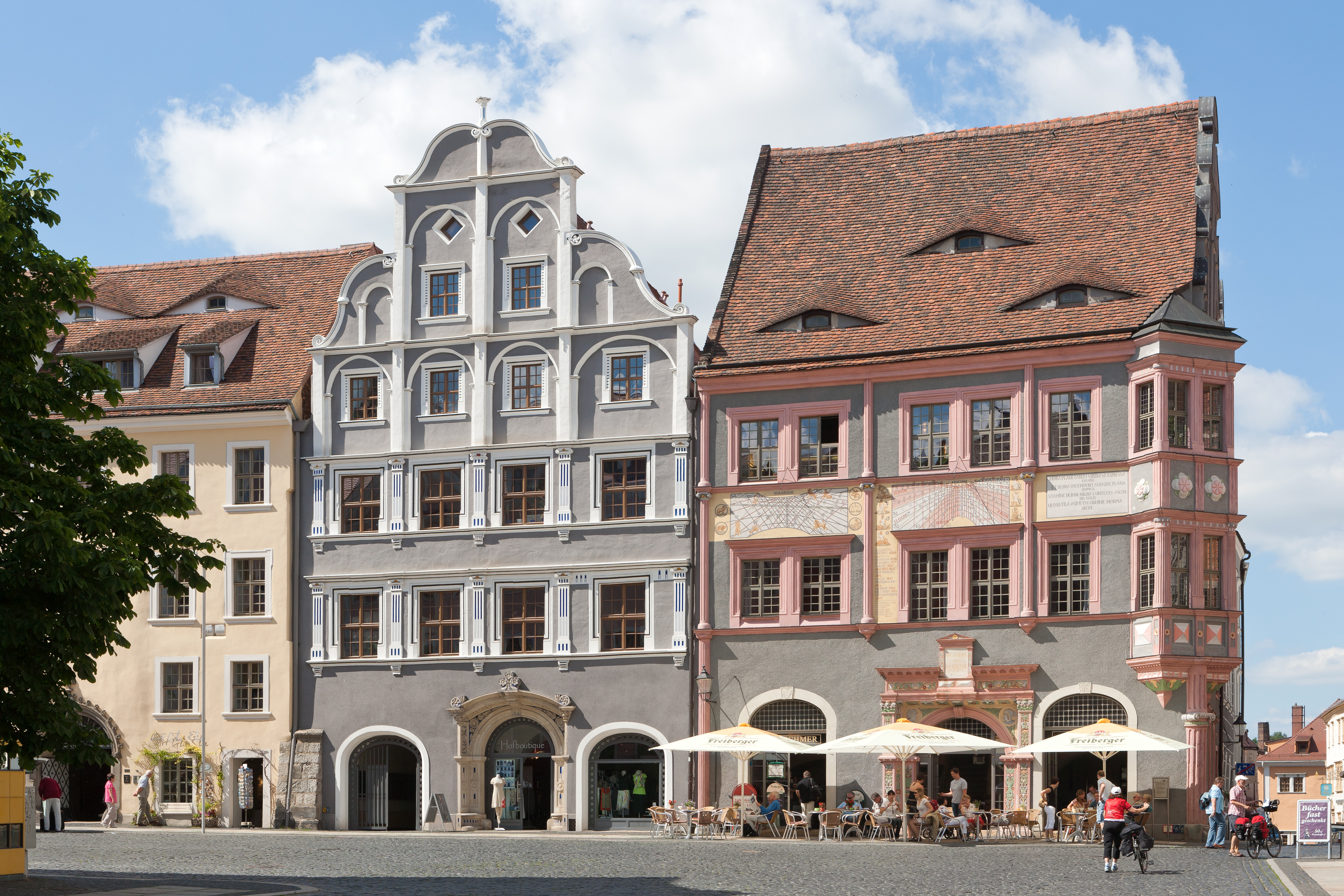
Lower Market Square

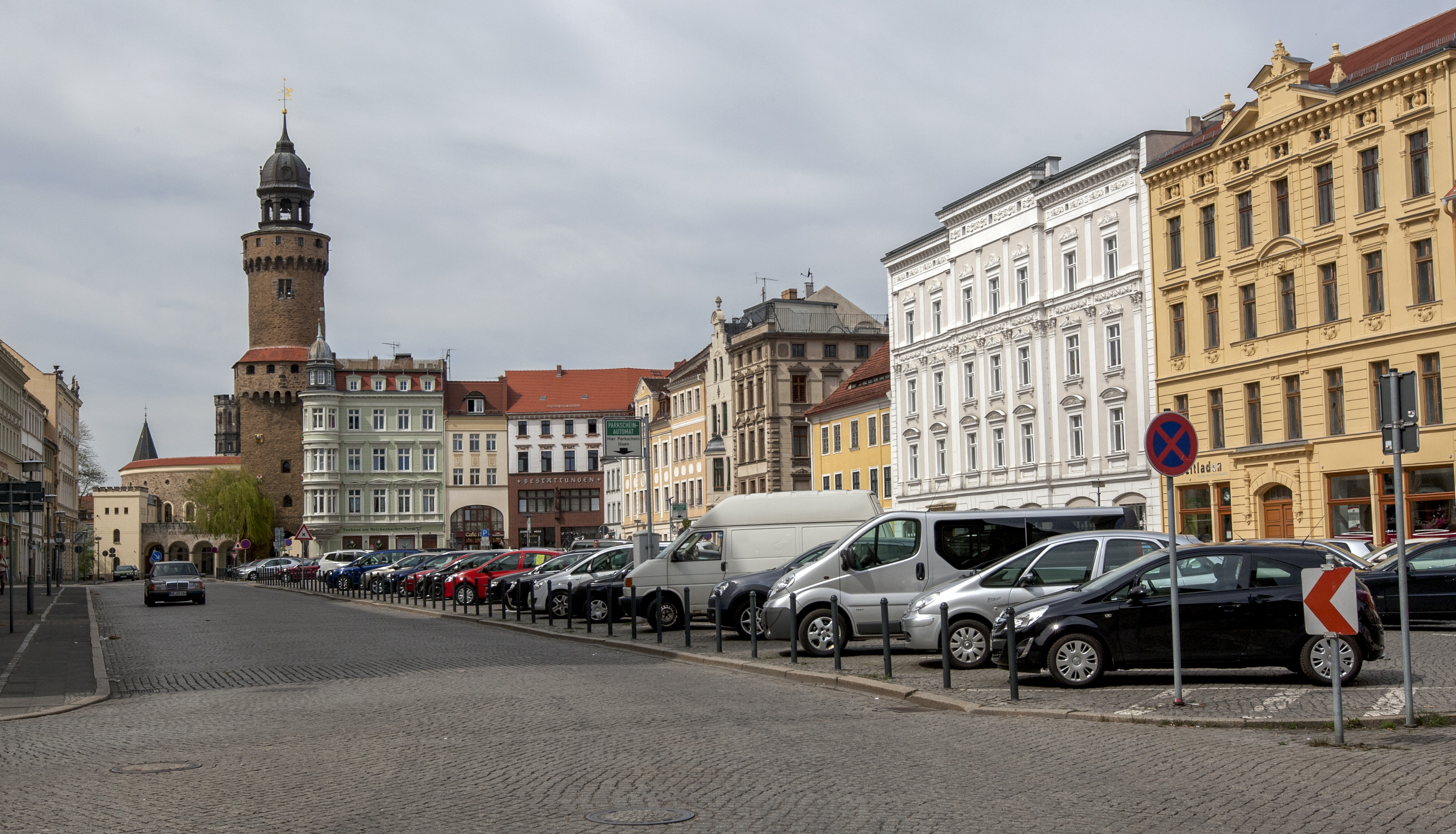
Upper Market Square

Görlitz has a rich architectural heritage (Gothic, Renaissance, Baroque, Neoclassical and Art Nouveau). One example of this heritage is the Schönhof, one of the oldest civic Renaissance buildings in Germany. Another medieval heritage is a model of the Holy Sepulchre (de) the construction of which began in 1465 under Bürgermeister Georg Emmerich.

In 2006, the twin cities of Görlitz and Zgorzelec applied to be the European City of Culture for 2010. It was hoped that the concept of Polish-German cooperation would be sufficient to convince the jury, but Essen won and Görlitz was placed second. As a result of the campaign Görlitz was renamed the City of Culture in order to further German-Polish relations and to attract tourists from all over the world.

As Görlitz was part of Silesia from 1815 onward, it has a Silesian Museum dedicated to the region (Schlesisches Museum zu Görlitz). The exhibition features the 1000-year-old cultural history of Silesia.

Görlitz is also the birthplace of the German version of nonpareils, popularly known in Germany as Liebesperlen (German for love pearls). Invented by confectioner Rudolf Hoinkis (1876–1944), the name derives from a conversation Hoinkis had with his wife, proclaiming his love for her was like these 'pearls', the nonpareil. Unsure of what to call the treat he invented, his wife suggested calling them love pearls and the name stuck. The factory where he first manufactured the treat, founded in 1896, is now run by his great-grandson, Mathias.

=== Film location ===
Due to the historical parts of the city, many movie-makers have used the various sites as locations. Eli Roth shot the movie-in-a-movie Nation's Pride (Stolz der Nation) for Quentin Tarantino's Inglourious Basterds (which incidentally purports to be France) in the Lower Market Square and Upper Market Square in the oldest parts of the city. Other films shot in Görlitz include the 2013 war drama The Book Thief and the teen years in The Reader. Görlitz was used as the primary shooting location for the Wes Anderson film The Grand Budapest Hotel, with Görlitz standing in for a resort in the fictional Eastern European country of Zubrowka. A vacant department store in the city was redecorated to serve as the hotel itself.

=== Sport ===
The town is represented by the football club Gelb-Weiss Görlitz.

== Geography ==
Görlitz is situated on the border with Poland, adjacent to the Polish town of Zgorzelec on the opposite bank of the Lusatian Neisse. The municipality measures 19.4 km (12.1 mi) from north to south, and 7.3 km (4.5 mi) from east to west. Its area is 67.52 km^{2} (26.07 sq mi).

=== Divisions ===
Görlitz is divided into 9 Stadtteile (town divisions) and 8 Ortsteile (formerly independent municipalities). These are:

- Stadtteile: Historische Altstadt, Innenstadt, Nikolaivorstadt, Südstadt, Rauschwalde, Biesnitz, Weinhübel, Königshufen and Klingewalde
- Ortsteile: Ober-Neundorf, Ludwigsdorf, Schlauroth, Kunnerwitz, Klein Neundorf, Deutsch-Ossig, Hagenwerder and Tauchritz

=== Transport ===
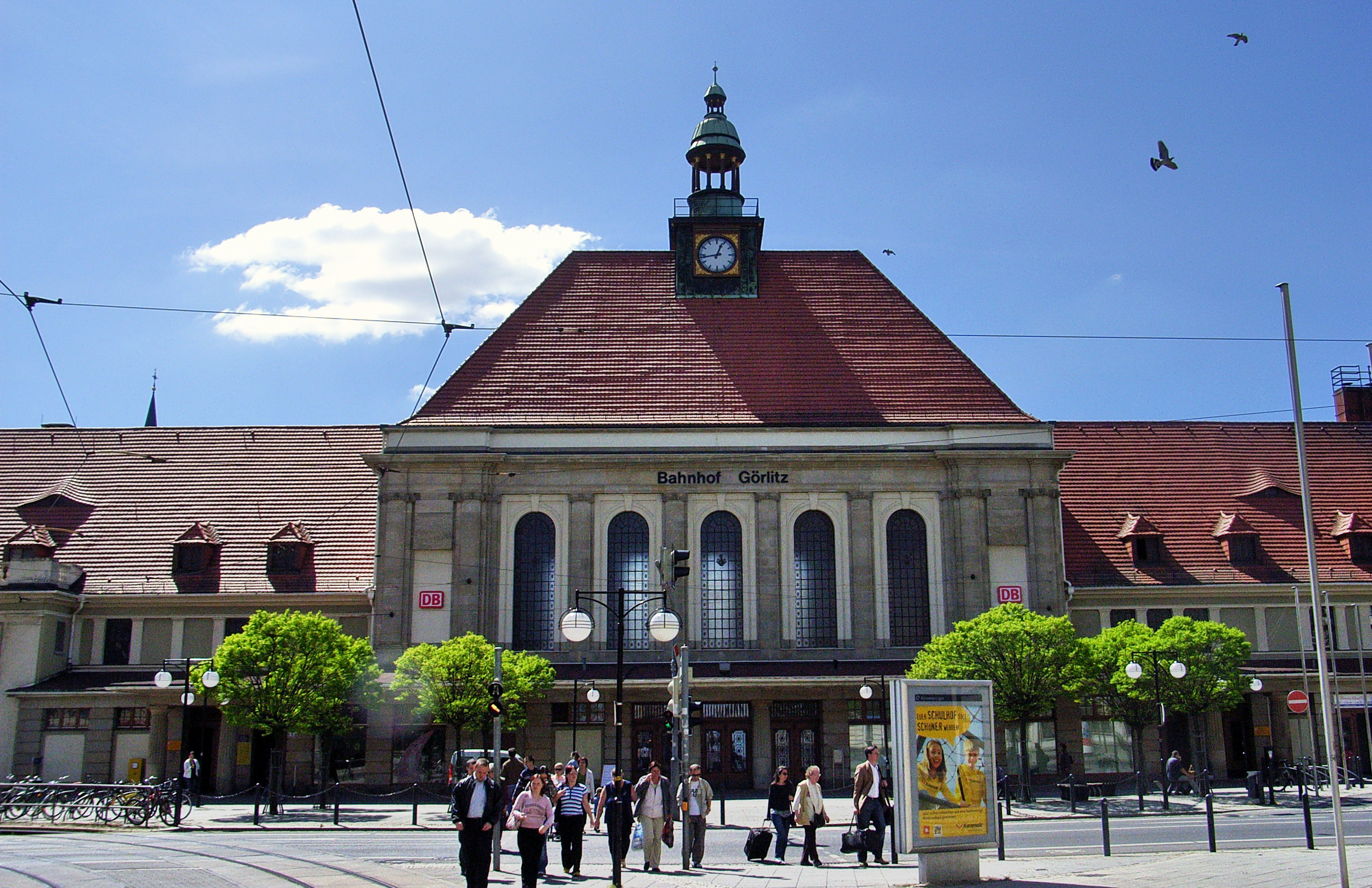
Görlitz Main Railway Station

Görlitz station is on the Berlin – Görlitz and the Dresden–Görlitz lines of Deutsche Bahn. The station also provides an international connection to Wrocław, Poland.

The nearest airports are Dresden Airport which is 102 km (63 mi) away and Wrocław Airport which is 174 km (108 mi) away.

Local public transport is provided by:

- The Verkehrsgesellschaft Görlitz (VGG) provides public transport service in the city, including the Görlitz tramway and bus services.
- The Przedsiębiorstwo Komunikacji Samochodowej (PKS) provides bus service over the river between Görlitz and its sister city, Zgorzelec.

=== Climate ===
The climate is oceanic (Köppen: Cfb) or on the western edge of humid continental (Dfb) at the 0 °C isotherm. The location on the easternmost border of Germany, far from the sea, gives a climate less affected by prevailing westerly winds although these do reach further into the western half of Poland. Summers can be warm, though not as much as in Southern Europe, and the winters are cold; snow is sporadic, not persisting all winter.

The Görlitz weather station has recorded the following extreme values:

- Its highest temperature was 37.9 °C (100.2 °F) on 7 August 2015.
- Its lowest temperature was −30.8 °C (−23.4 °F) on 9 February 1956.
- Its greatest annual precipitation was 1,013.7 mm (39.91 in) in 1939.
- Its least annual precipitation was 362.4 mm (14.27 in) in 1943.
- The longest annual sunshine was 2,162.5 hours in 2011.
- The shortest annual sunshine was 1,368.3 hours in 1977.

Climate data for Görlitz (1991–2020 normals, extremes 1860–present)
Month	Jan	Feb	Mar	Apr	May	Jun	Jul	Aug	Sep	Oct	Nov	Dec	Year
Record high °C (°F)	16.0 (60.8)	17.0 (62.6)	23.3 (73.9)	30.2 (86.4)	33.2 (91.8)	35.7 (96.3)	35.9 (96.6)	37.9 (100.2)	33.4 (92.1)	26.0 (78.8)	19.2 (66.6)	16.3 (61.3)	37.9 (100.2)
Mean maximum °C (°F)	9.8 (49.6)	11.3 (52.3)	17.0 (62.6)	23.3 (73.9)	26.9 (80.4)	30.4 (86.7)	32.0 (89.6)	31.7 (89.1)	26.3 (79.3)	21.1 (70.0)	14.4 (57.9)	10.3 (50.5)	33.4 (92.1)
Mean daily maximum °C (°F)	2.2 (36.0)	3.7 (38.7)	8.0 (46.4)	14.2 (57.6)	18.7 (65.7)	22.0 (71.6)	24.2 (75.6)	24.1 (75.4)	18.8 (65.8)	13.1 (55.6)	7.2 (45.0)	3.2 (37.8)	13.3 (55.9)
Daily mean °C (°F)	−0.2 (31.6)	0.9 (33.6)	4.1 (39.4)	9.3 (48.7)	13.6 (56.5)	16.9 (62.4)	18.9 (66.0)	18.6 (65.5)	14.1 (57.4)	9.4 (48.9)	4.6 (40.3)	1.0 (33.8)	9.3 (48.7)
Mean daily minimum °C (°F)	−2.8 (27.0)	−2.1 (28.2)	0.4 (32.7)	4.0 (39.2)	8.0 (46.4)	11.4 (52.5)	13.4 (56.1)	13.2 (55.8)	9.6 (49.3)	5.7 (42.3)	1.9 (35.4)	−1.3 (29.7)	5.1 (41.2)
Mean minimum °C (°F)	−13.5 (7.7)	−10.8 (12.6)	−6.2 (20.8)	−2.4 (27.7)	2.1 (35.8)	6.2 (43.2)	8.4 (47.1)	7.8 (46.0)	3.5 (38.3)	−1.2 (29.8)	−5.0 (23.0)	−10.0 (14.0)	−15.6 (3.9)
Record low °C (°F)	−27.5 (−17.5)	−30.8 (−23.4)	−21.9 (−7.4)	−9.3 (15.3)	−3.3 (26.1)	0.2 (32.4)	3.9 (39.0)	4.0 (39.2)	−1.4 (29.5)	−6.2 (20.8)	−15.0 (5.0)	−24.4 (−11.9)	−30.8 (−23.4)
Average precipitation mm (inches)	44.0 (1.73)	35.4 (1.39)	48.5 (1.91)	36.2 (1.43)	59.1 (2.33)	69.4 (2.73)	89.1 (3.51)	78.5 (3.09)	54.6 (2.15)	46.0 (1.81)	42.8 (1.69)	42.7 (1.68)	646.2 (25.44)
Average extreme snow depth cm (inches)	12.1 (4.8)	11.0 (4.3)	6.4 (2.5)	1.0 (0.4)	0 (0)	0 (0)	0 (0)	0 (0)	0 (0)	0.3 (0.1)	3.5 (1.4)	8.8 (3.5)	18.9 (7.4)
Average precipitation days (≥ 1.0 mm)	16.7	14.9	15.7	12.1	13.9	13.9	14.0	12.9	12.5	13.6	14.5	16.1	170.7
Average snowy days (≥ 1.0 cm)	14.3	11.5	5.4	0.9	0	0	0	0	0	0.1	2.5	8.6	43.3
Average relative humidity (%)	84.0	80.6	76.4	68.9	70.3	70.4	69.2	69.8	76.4	80.6	84.9	84.9	76.4
Mean monthly sunshine hours	61.3	82.8	132.0	192.7	227.1	227.1	236.2	228.3	165.8	122.7	67.7	56.3	1,791.5
Source 1: World Meteorological Organization
Source 2: Deutscher Wetterdienst / SKlima.de

== Governance ==
=== Mayor and city council ===
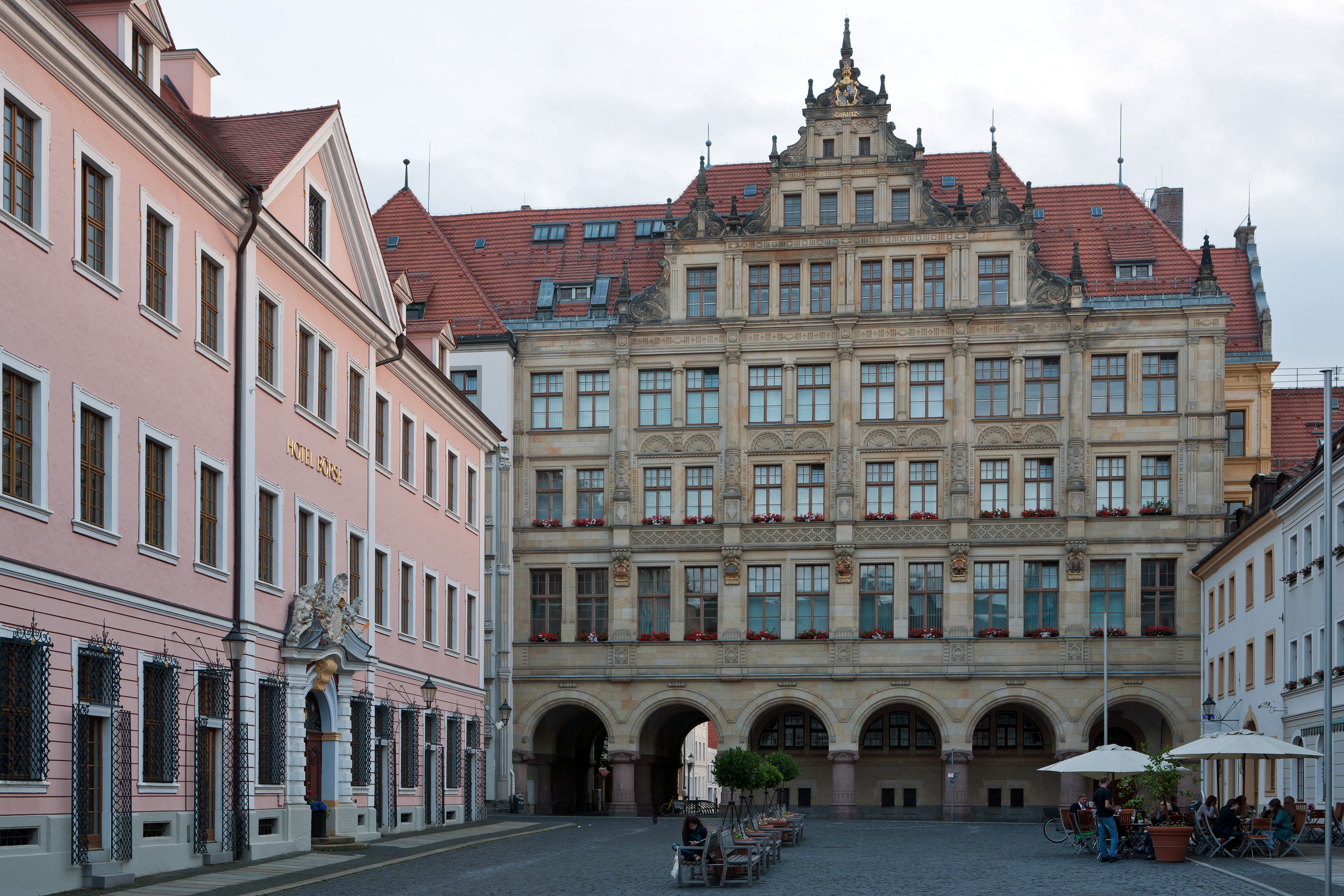
The New Town Hall

The first freely elected mayor after German reunification was Matthias Lechner of the Christian Democratic Union (CDU), who served from 1990 to 1998. The mayor was originally chosen by the city council, but since 1994 has been directly elected. Rolf Karbaum served from 1998 until 2005, Joachim Paulick from 2005 to 2012, and Siegfried Deinege from 2012 to 2019; all were independents. In 2019, CDU politician Octavian Ursu was elected mayor. The most recent mayoral election was held on 26 May 2019, with a runoff held on 16 June, and the results were as follows:

Candidate	Party	First round		Second round	
Candidate	Party	Votes	%	Votes	%
Sebastian Wippel	Alternative for Germany	9,710	36.4	11,390	44.8
Octavian Ursu	Christian Democratic Union	8,077	30.3	14,043	55.2
Franziska Schubert	Green/BfG/MG/SPD/PARTEI	7,436	27.9		
Jana Lübeck	The Left	1,470	5.5		
Valid votes		26,693	98.7	25,433	98.6
Invalid votes		339	1.3	370	1.4
Total		27,032	100.0	25,803	100.0
Electorate/voter turnout		46,120	58.6	46,135	55.9
Source: Wahlen in Sachsen

The most recent city council election was held on 6 June 2024, and the results were as follows:

Party	Votes	%	+/-	Seats	+/-
Alternative for Germany (AfD)	28,496	37.2	▲6.4	14	▲1
Christian Democratic Union (CDU)	19,765	25.8	▲3.8	10	▲1
Citizens for Görlitz (BfG)	10,679	13.9	▼3.6	5	▼2
Motor Görlitz (MG)	6,266	8.2	▲2.5	3	▲1
The Left (Die Linke)	4,727	6.2	▼2.3	2	▼1
Alliance 90/The Greens (Grüne)	3,309	4.3	▼3.3	2	▼1
Social Democratic Party (SPD)	1,951	2.5	▲0.2	1	0
Free Saxons	1,377	1.8	New	1	New
Valid votes	76,570	100.0			
Invalid ballots	428	1.6			
Total ballots	26,964	100.0		38	±0
Electorate/voter turnout	45,068	59.8	▲1.1		
Source: City of Görlitz

== Twin towns – sister cities ==
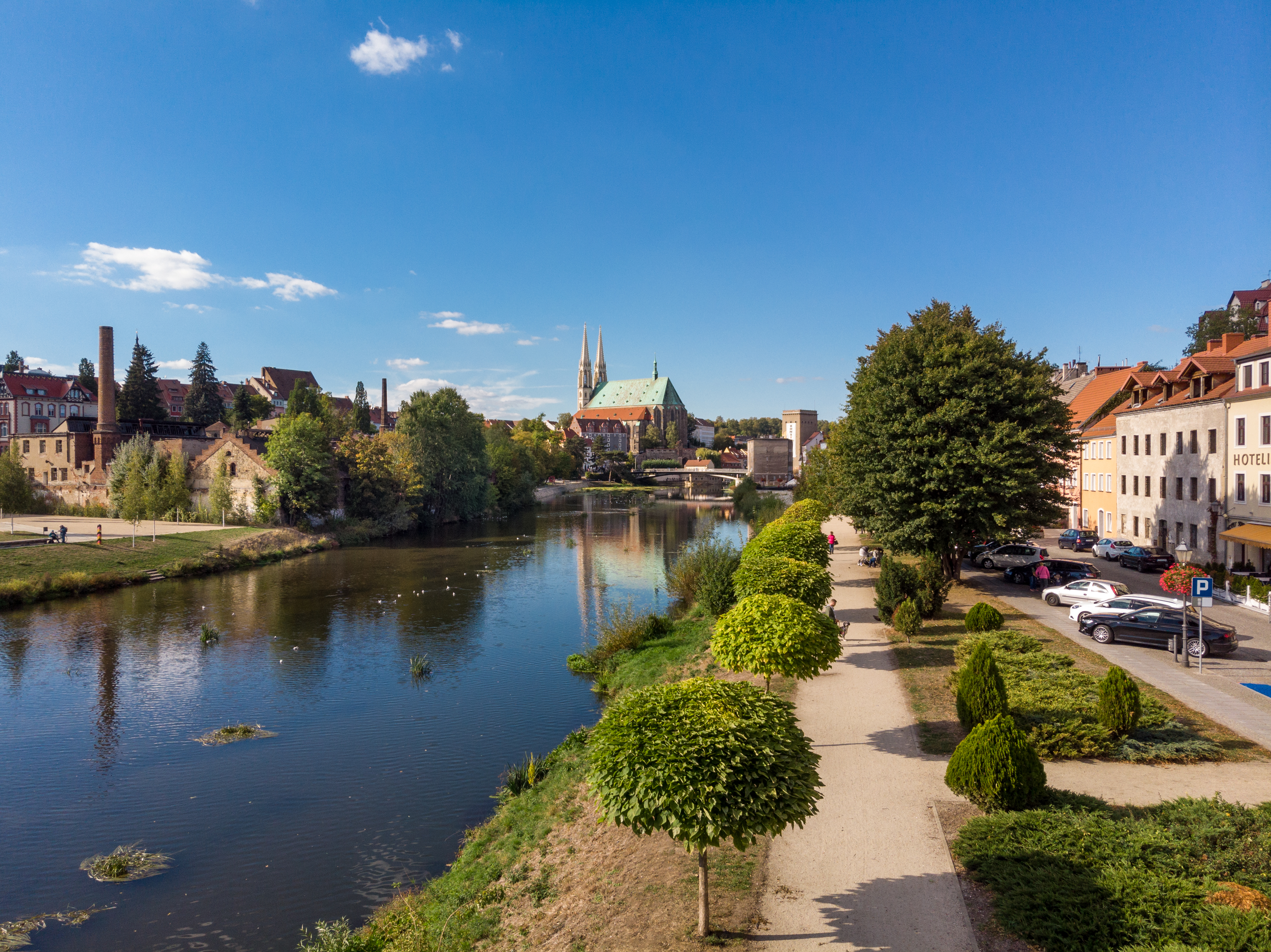
Görlitz seen from its twin town Zgorzelec, Poland

Görlitz is twinned with:

- Amiens, France
- Molfetta, Italy
- Nový Jičín, Czech Republic
- Wiesbaden, Germany
- Zgorzelec, Poland

Being the easternmost town in the country, Görlitz has formed a 'Compass Alliance' (Zipfelbund) with the northernmost, westernmost and southernmost towns, List, Selfkant and Oberstdorf respectively. They participate in the annual German Unity Day celebrations to represent the modern limits of Germany.

== Notable people ==
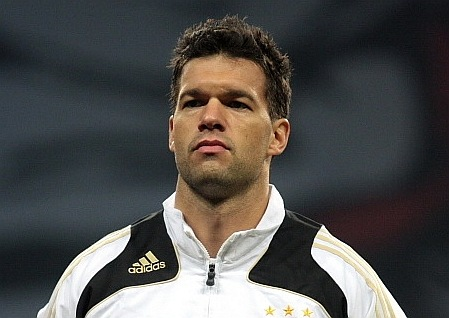
Michael Ballack

- Adasse (fl.1348), money lender
- Michael Ballack (born 1976), football player
- Jakob Böhme (1575–1624), mystic and theologian
- Johann Christoph Brotze (1742–1823), educator
- Hans Georg Dehmelt (1922–2017), co-recipient of the 1989 Nobel Prize in Physics
- Hans-Jürgen Dörner (1951–2022), football player and coach
- Werner Finck (1902–1978), comedian, actor and writer
- Richard Foerster (classical scholar) (1843–1922), classical scholar
- Johann Carl Gehler (1732–1796) physician, anatomist and mineralogist
- Gottlob Harrer (1703–1755), composer
- Clara Hepner (1860–1939), German-Jewish writer
- Torsten Gütschow (born 1962), football player
- Herbert Hirche (1910–2002), architect and designer
- Hanna von Hoerner (1942–2014), astrophysicist
- Emil Jannings (1884–1950), first actor to win the Academy Award for Best Actor
- Jens Jeremies (born 1974), football player
- Reinhart Koselleck (1923–2006), historian
- Michael Kretschmer (born 1975), politician (CDU), Minister President of Saxony
- Lars Kaufmann (born 1982), handball player
- Mira Lobe (born 1913), writer of more than 100 children's books
- Selma Lohse (1883–1937), politician
- Oskar Morgenstern (1902–1977), economist
- Gustavus Adolphus Neumann (1807–1886), publisher
- Arthur Pohl (1900–1970), set designer, director and screenwriter
- Hans Ulrich Rudel (1916–1982) highly decorated WWII pilot for Nazi Germany
- Pavle Jurišić Šturm (1848–1922), Serbian Army general, born in Görlitz
- Alfred Wagenknecht (1881–1956), American Marxist politician
- Sebastian Wippel (born 1982), politician
- Giorgio Zur (1930–2019), Catholic Archbishop and Apostolic Nuncio in Austria

== Gallery ==
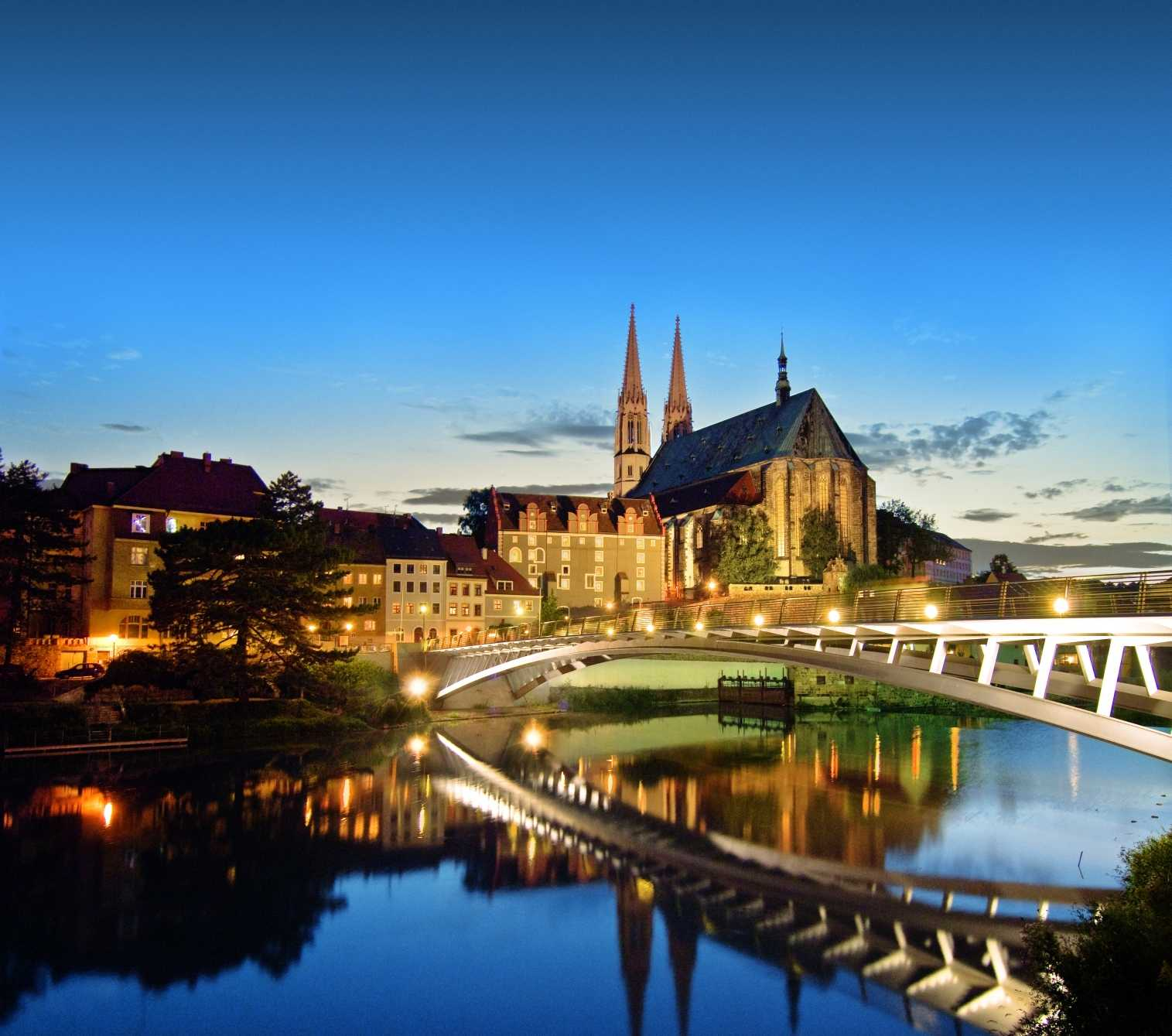
St. Peter and Paul church, the Woad House and the river Lusatian Neisse in Görlitz

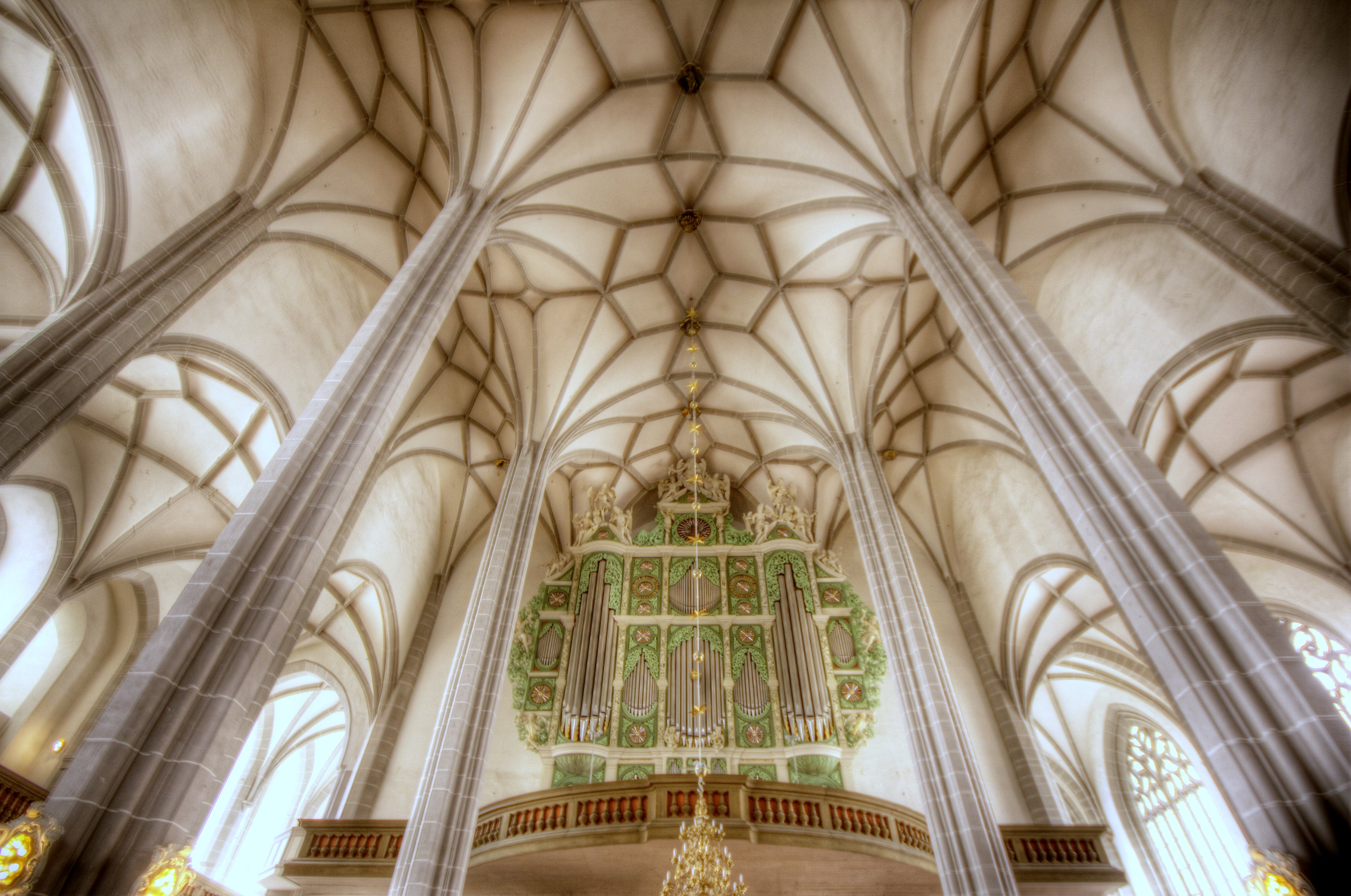
Interior of St. Peter and Paul with its Sonnenorgel (sun organ)

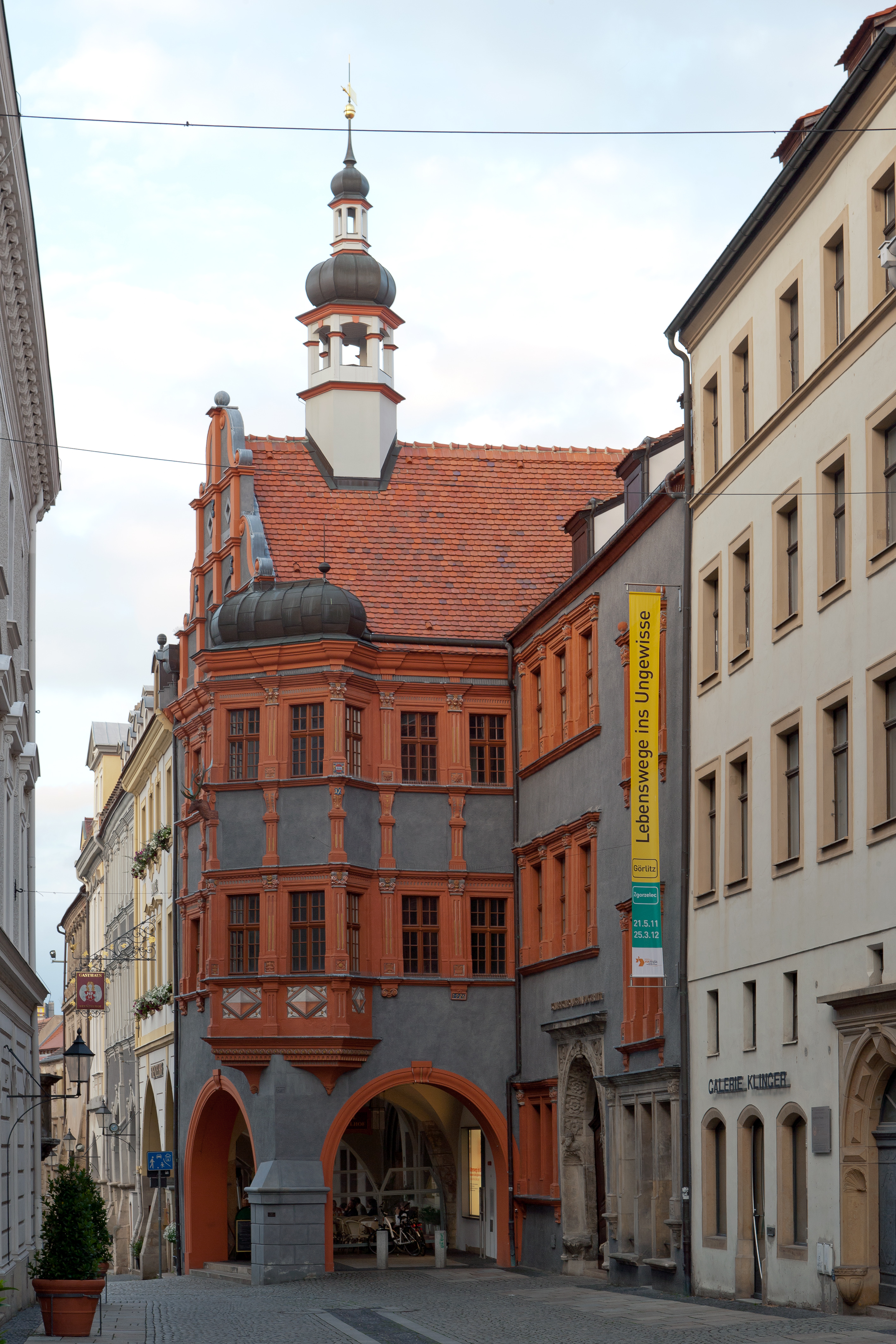
The Schönhof, the oldest Renaissance building in Görlitz

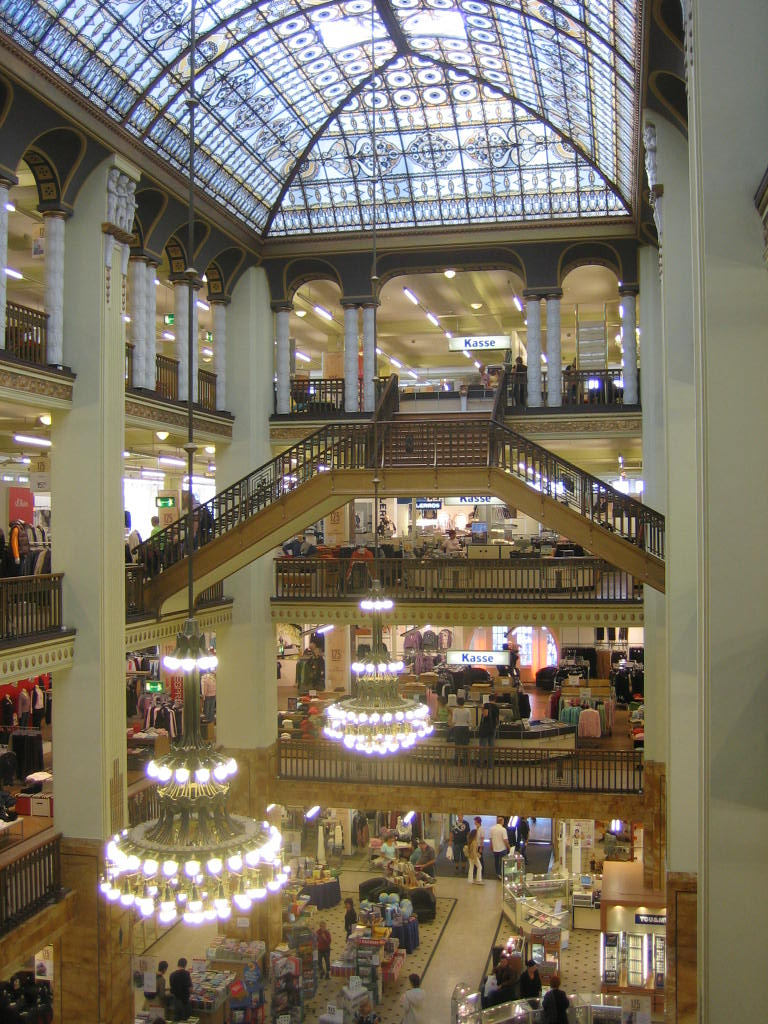
Interior of the Görlitzer Warenhaus department store

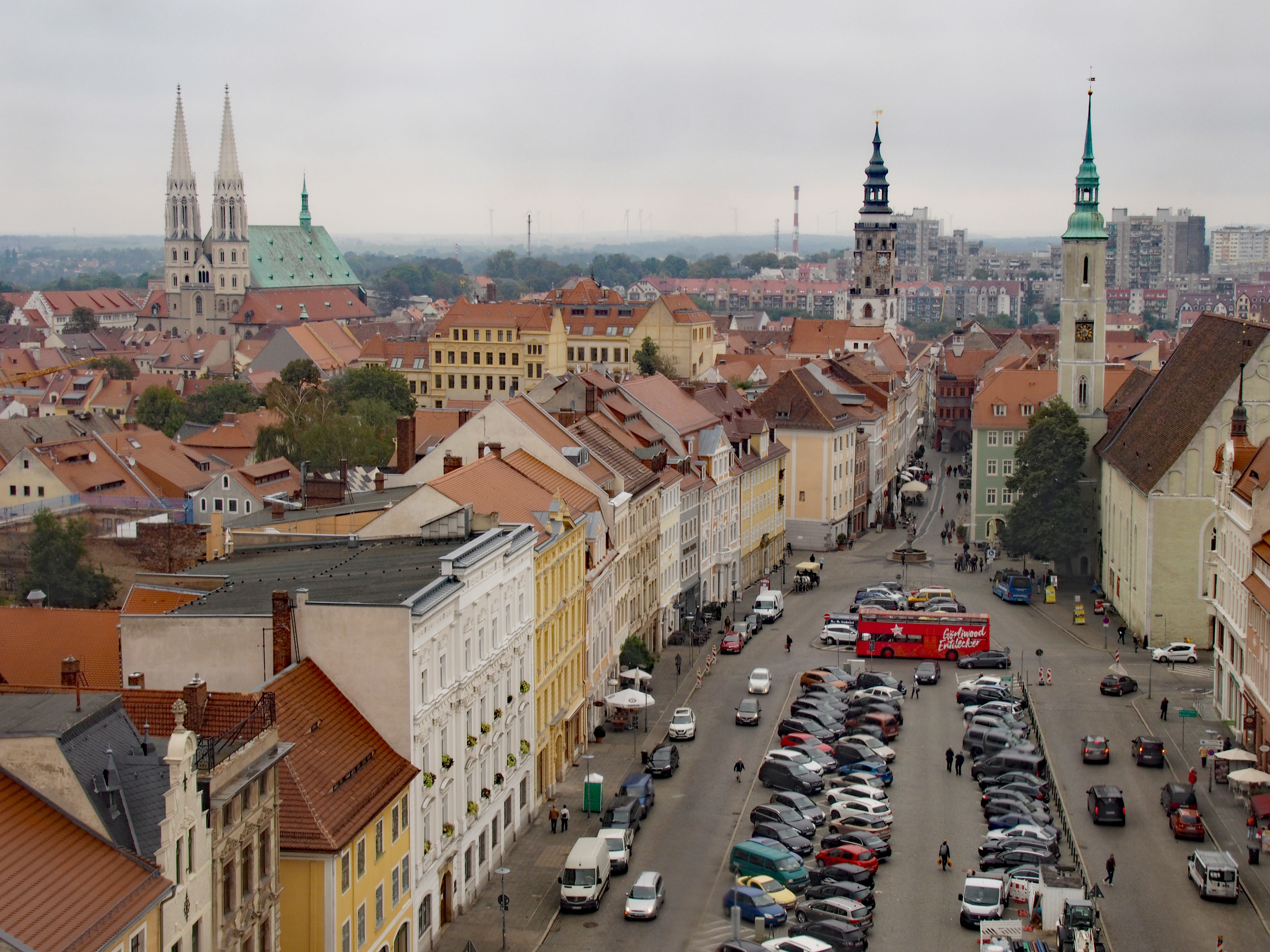
View over Upper Market Square taken from Reichenbach Tower, residential buildings of Zgorzelec in the background

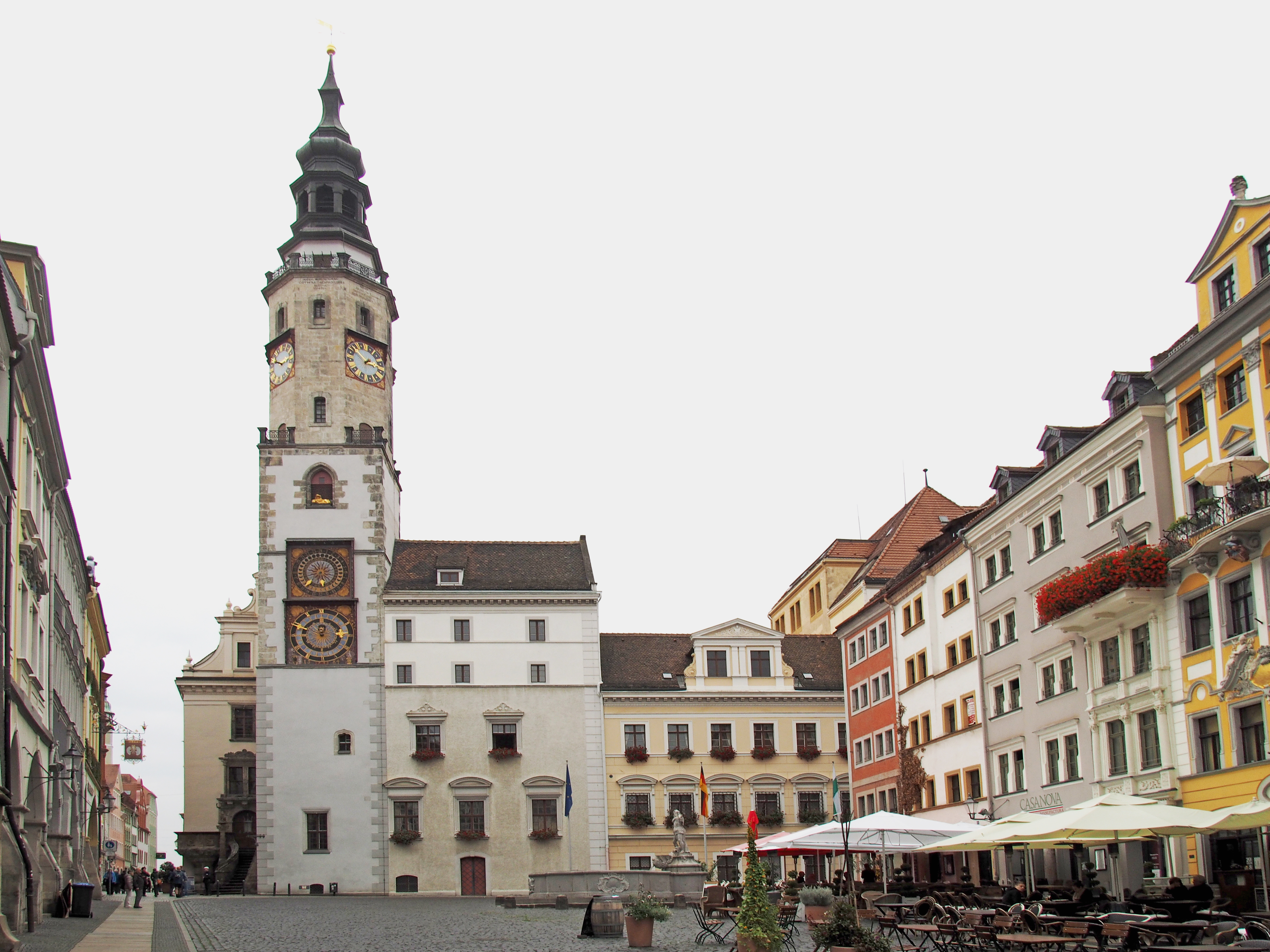
Old town hall on the Lower Market Square

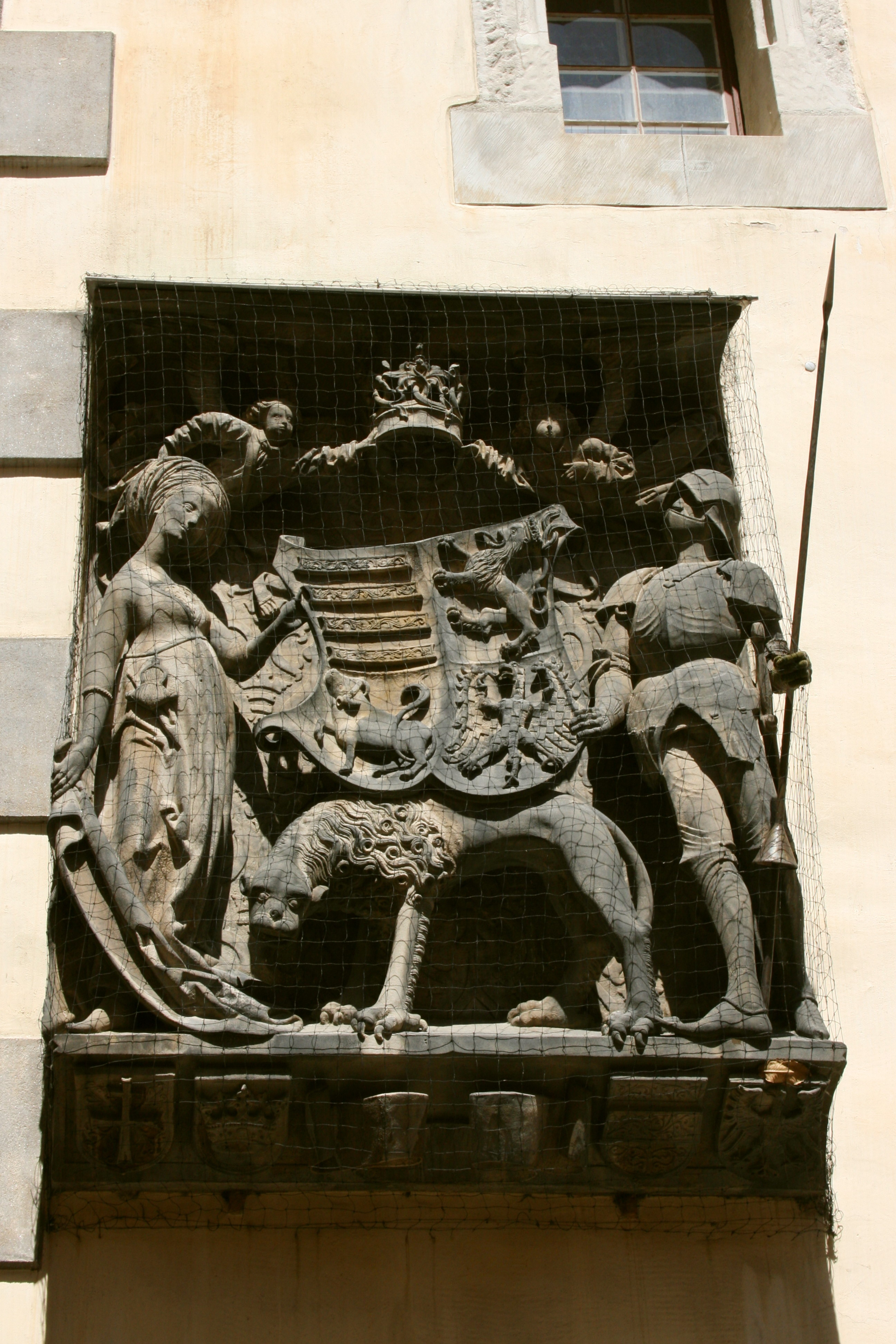
Royal coats of arms of Hungarian King Matthias Corvinus (Old Town Hall)

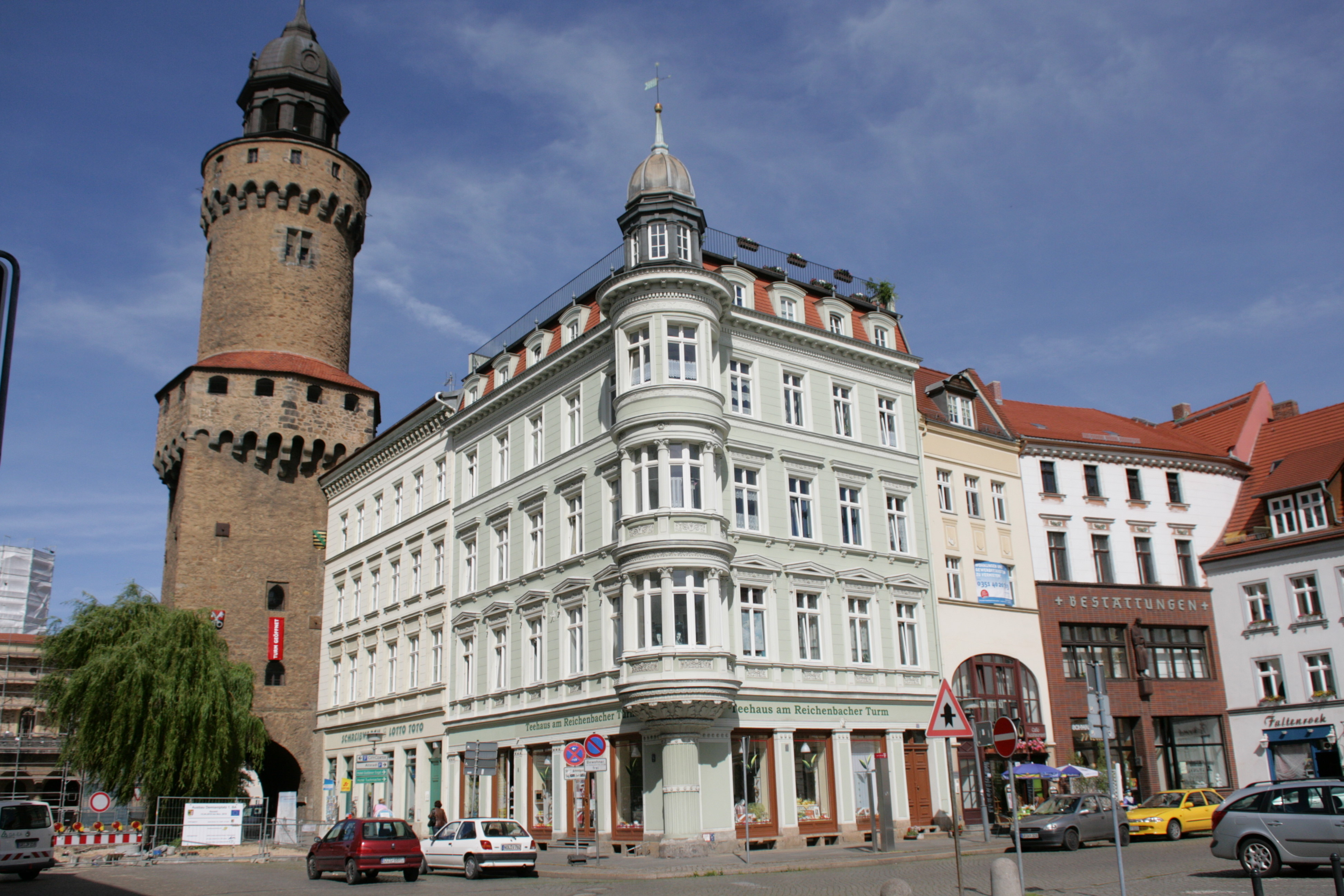
Reichenbach Tower

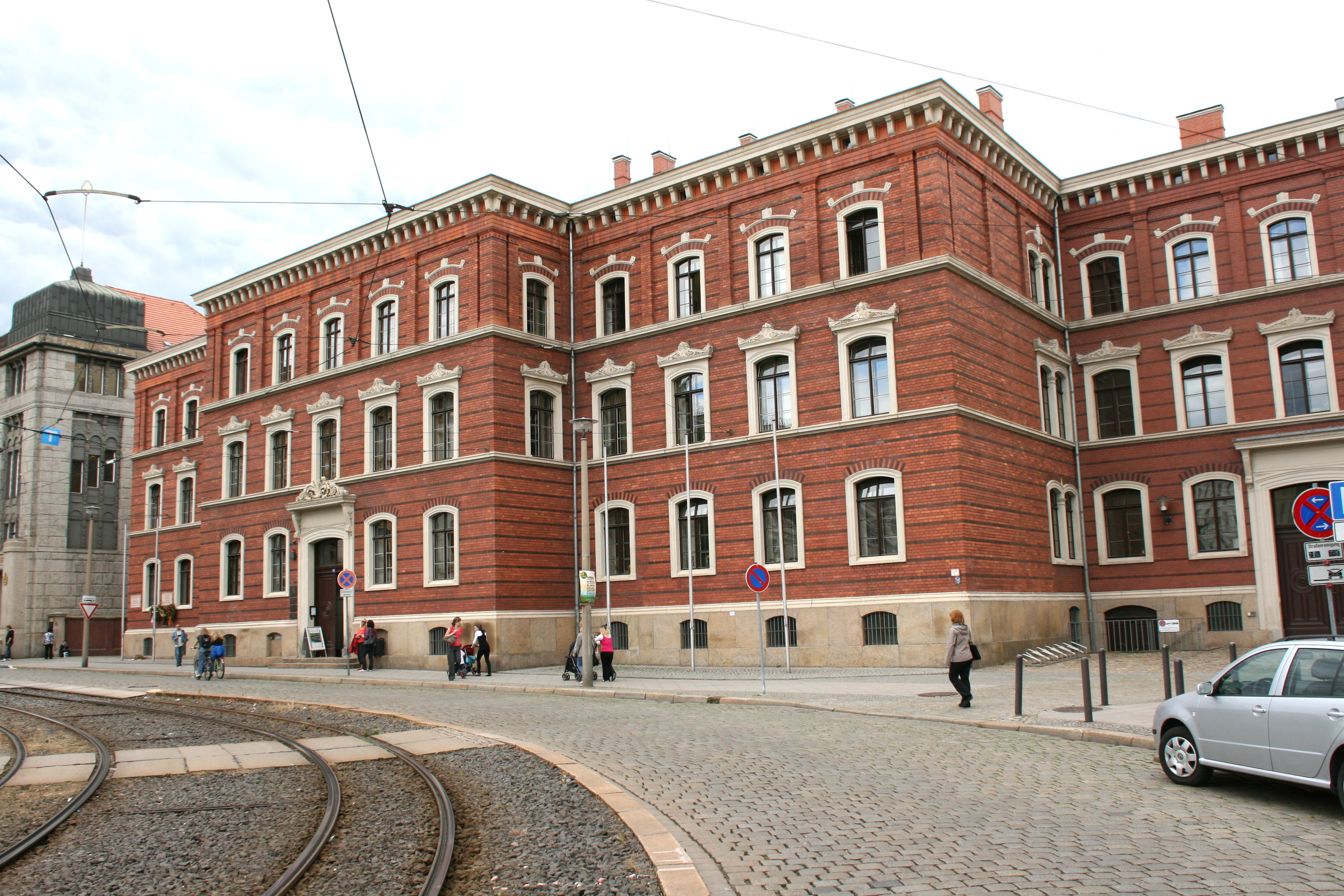
Courthouse

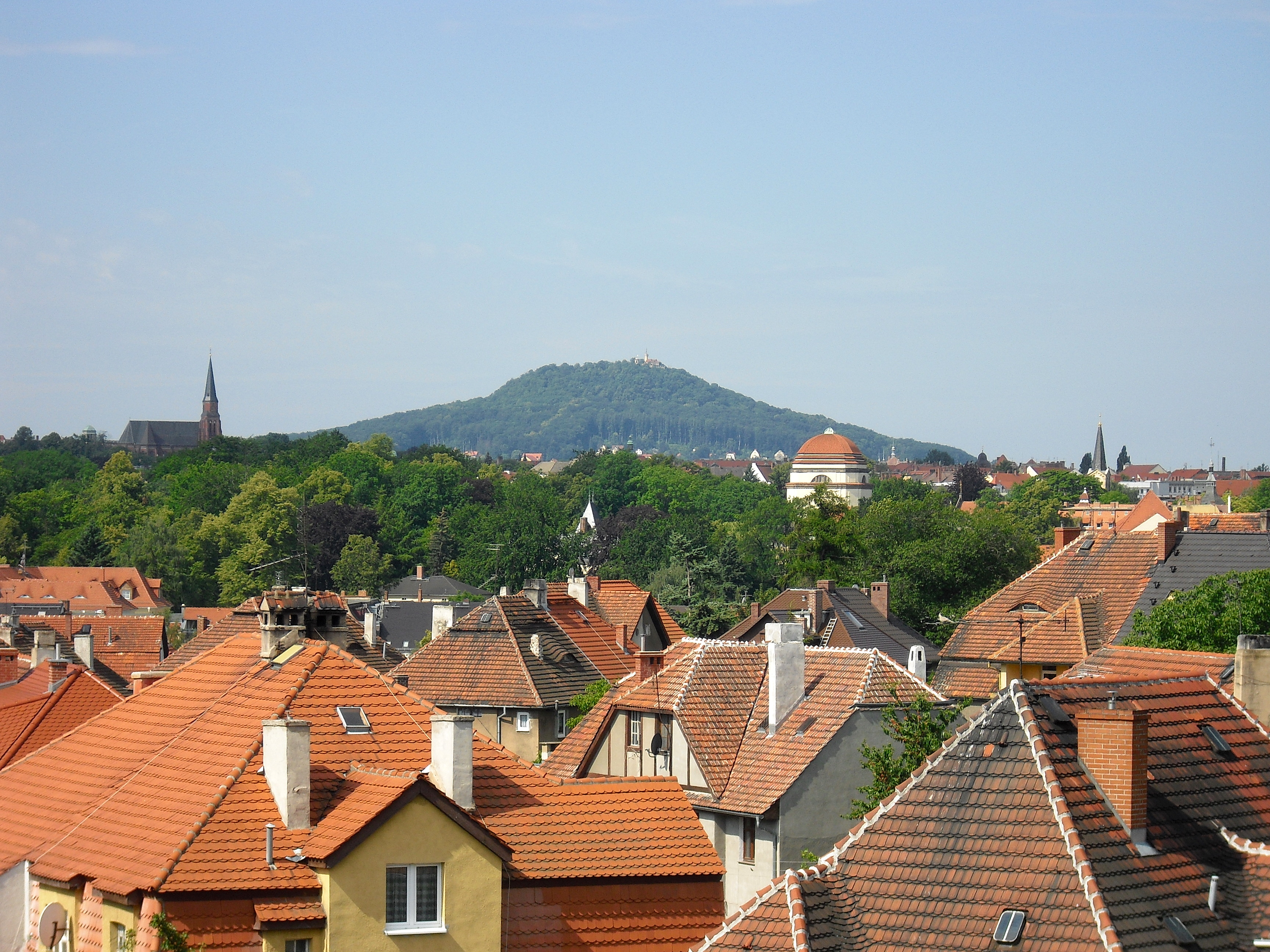
The Landeskrone, literally "land's crown", the local mountain of Görlitz

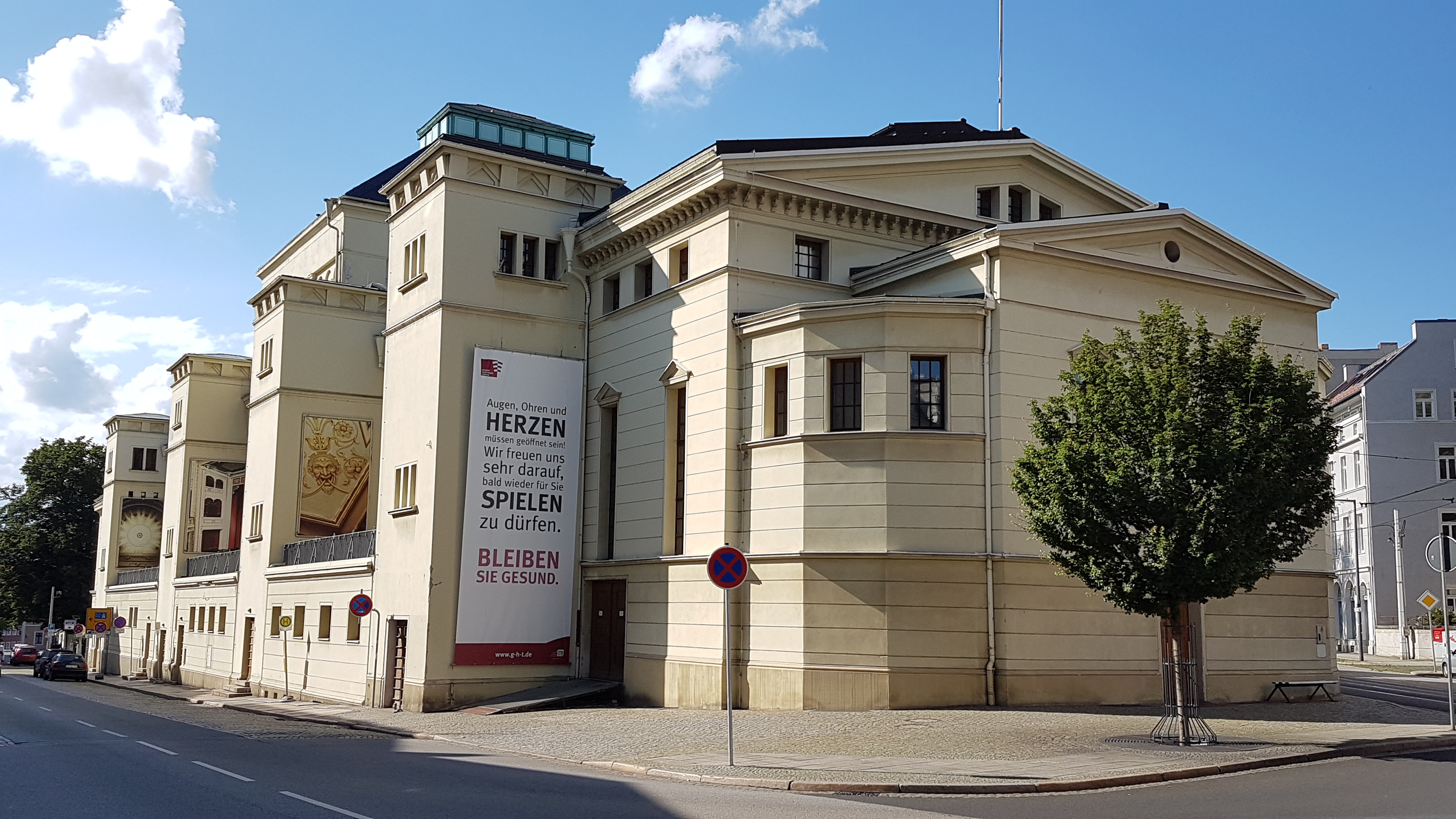
Theatre

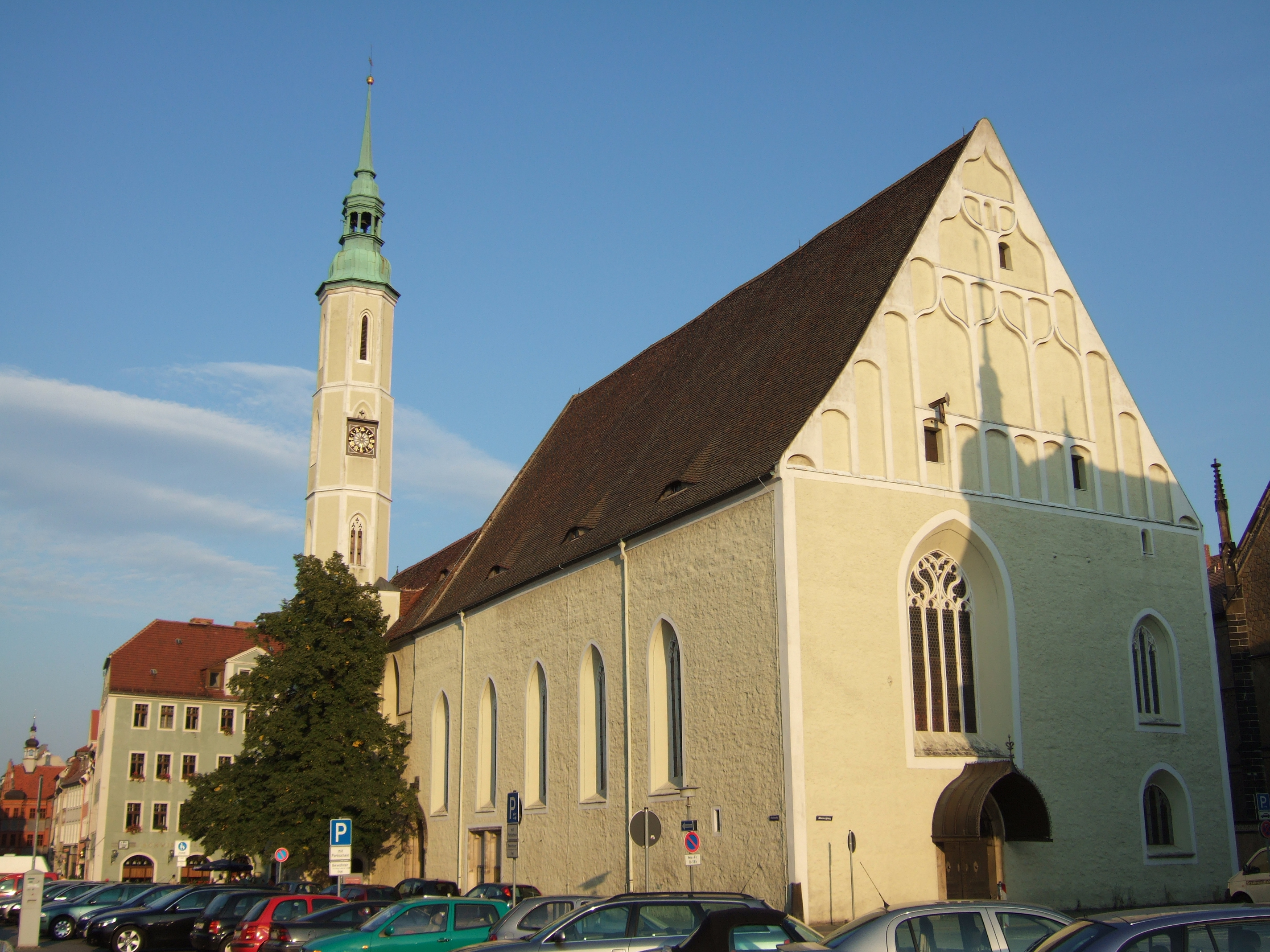
Gothic Holy Trinity church

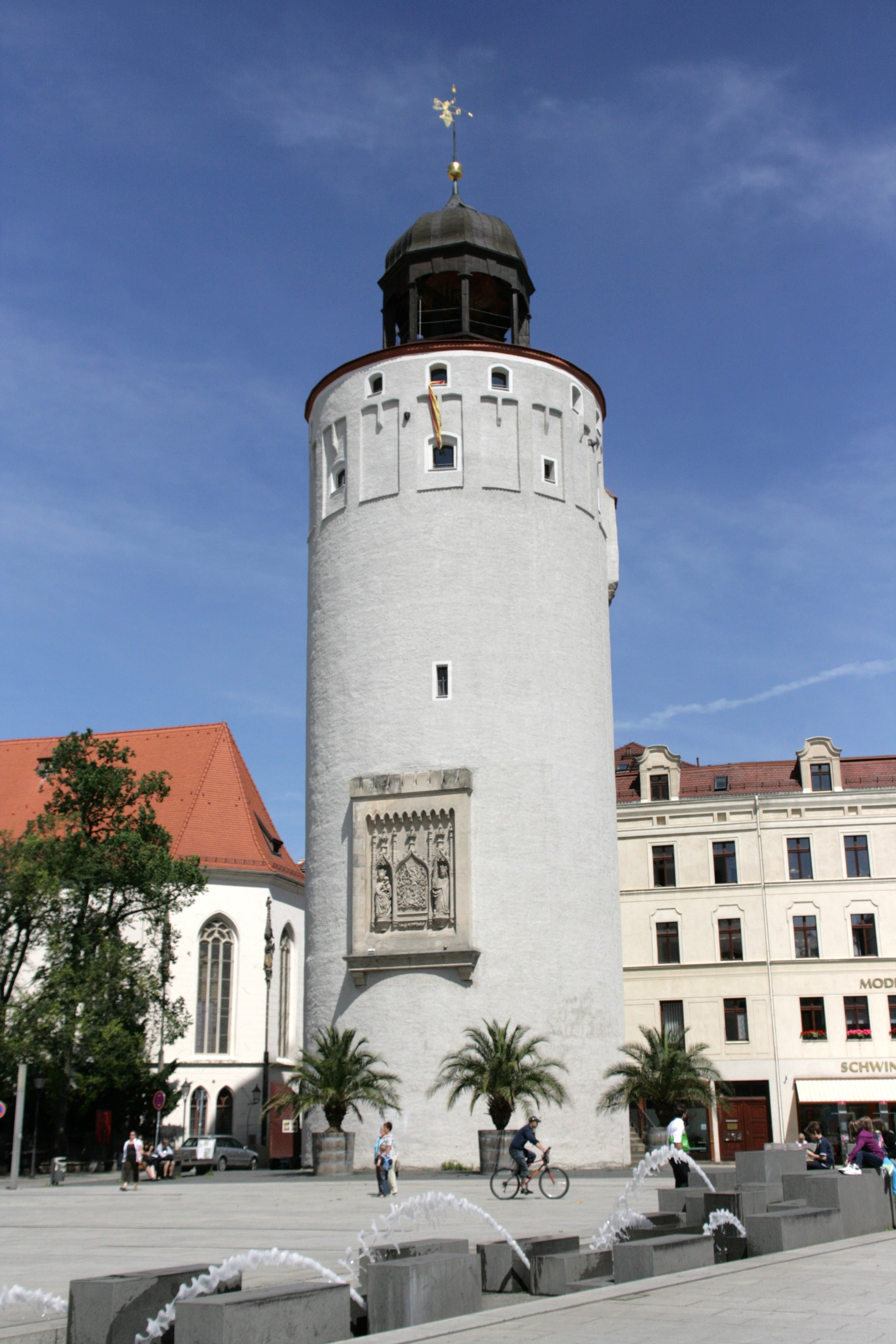
Thick Tower

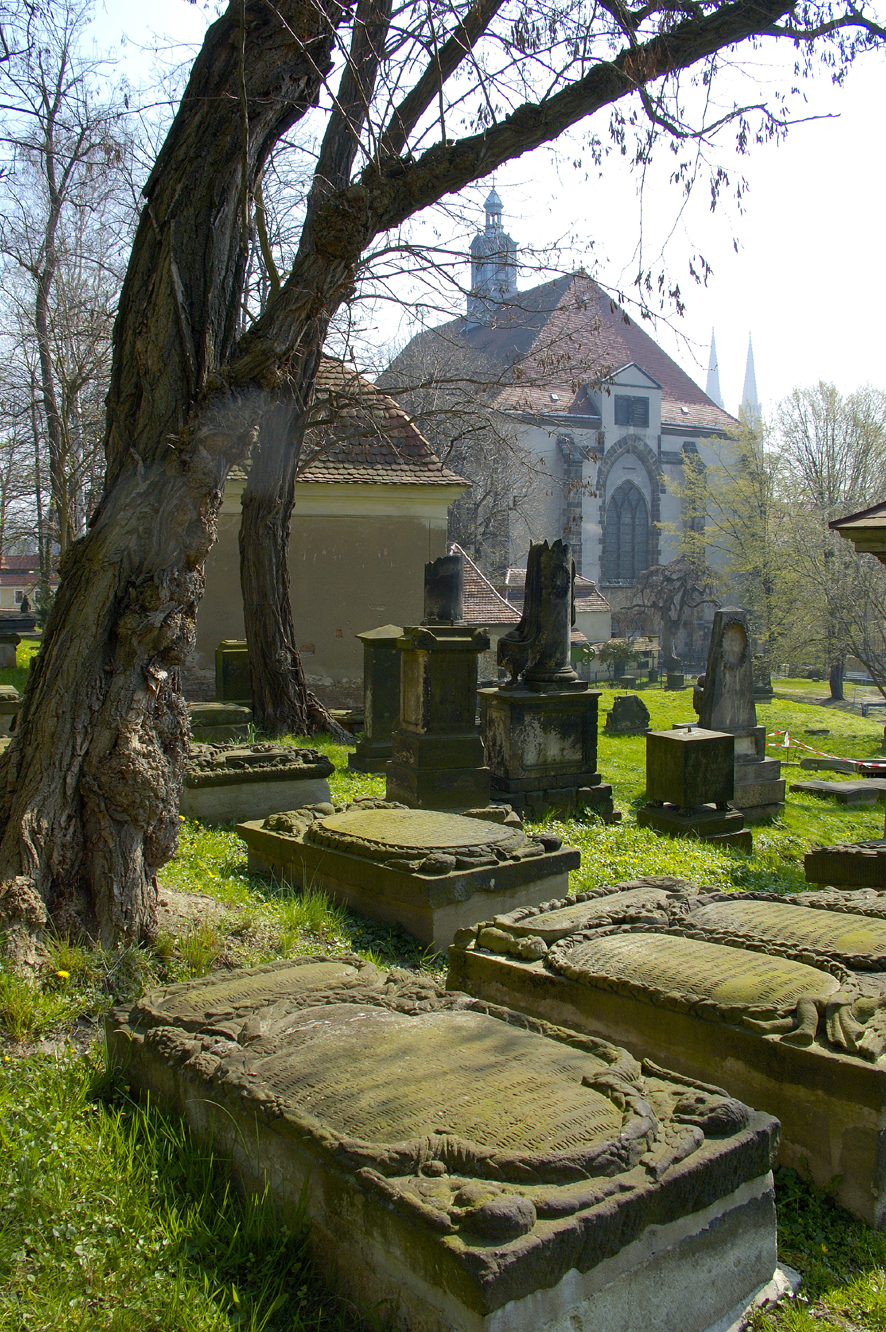
Nikolai Cemetery

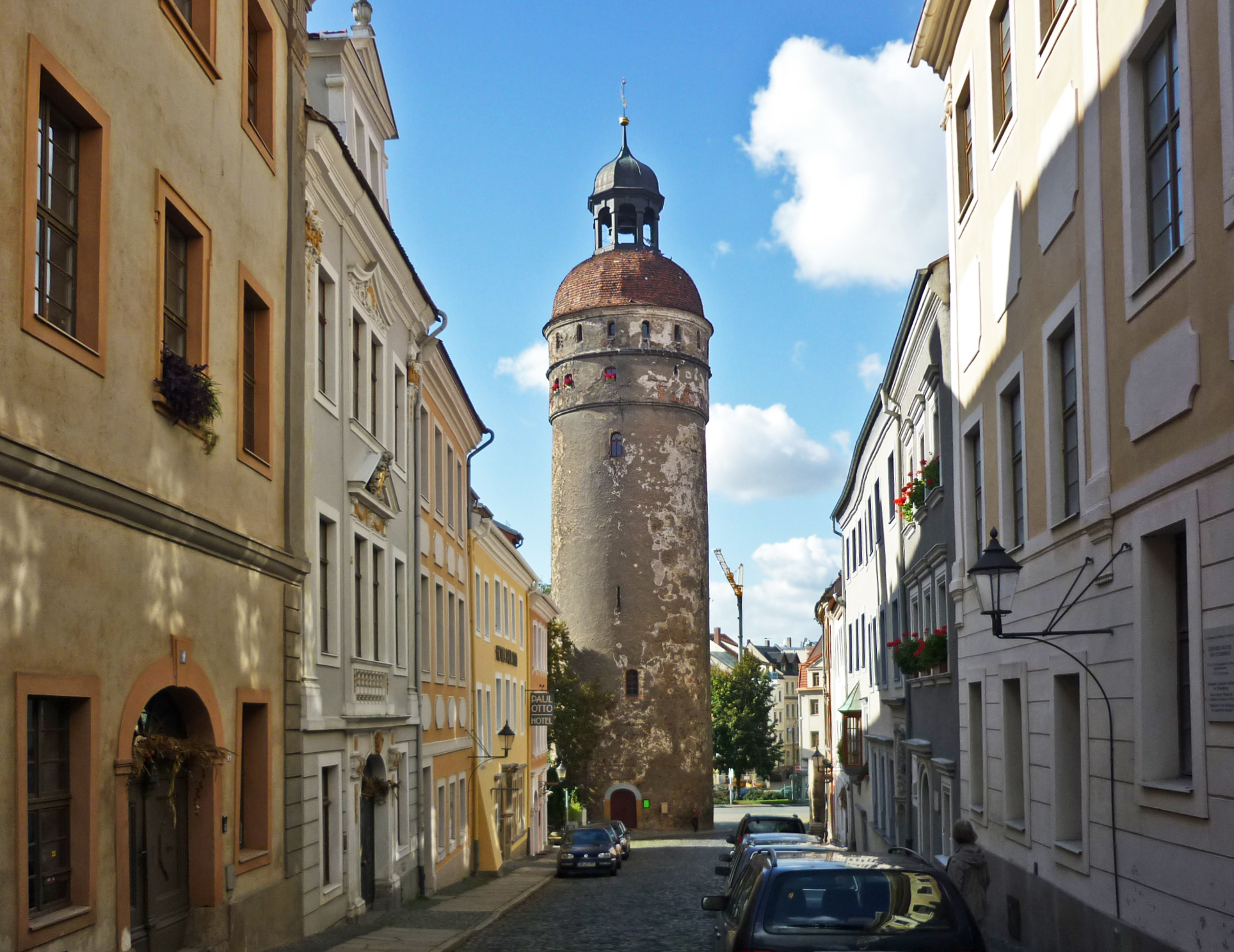
Nikolai Tower

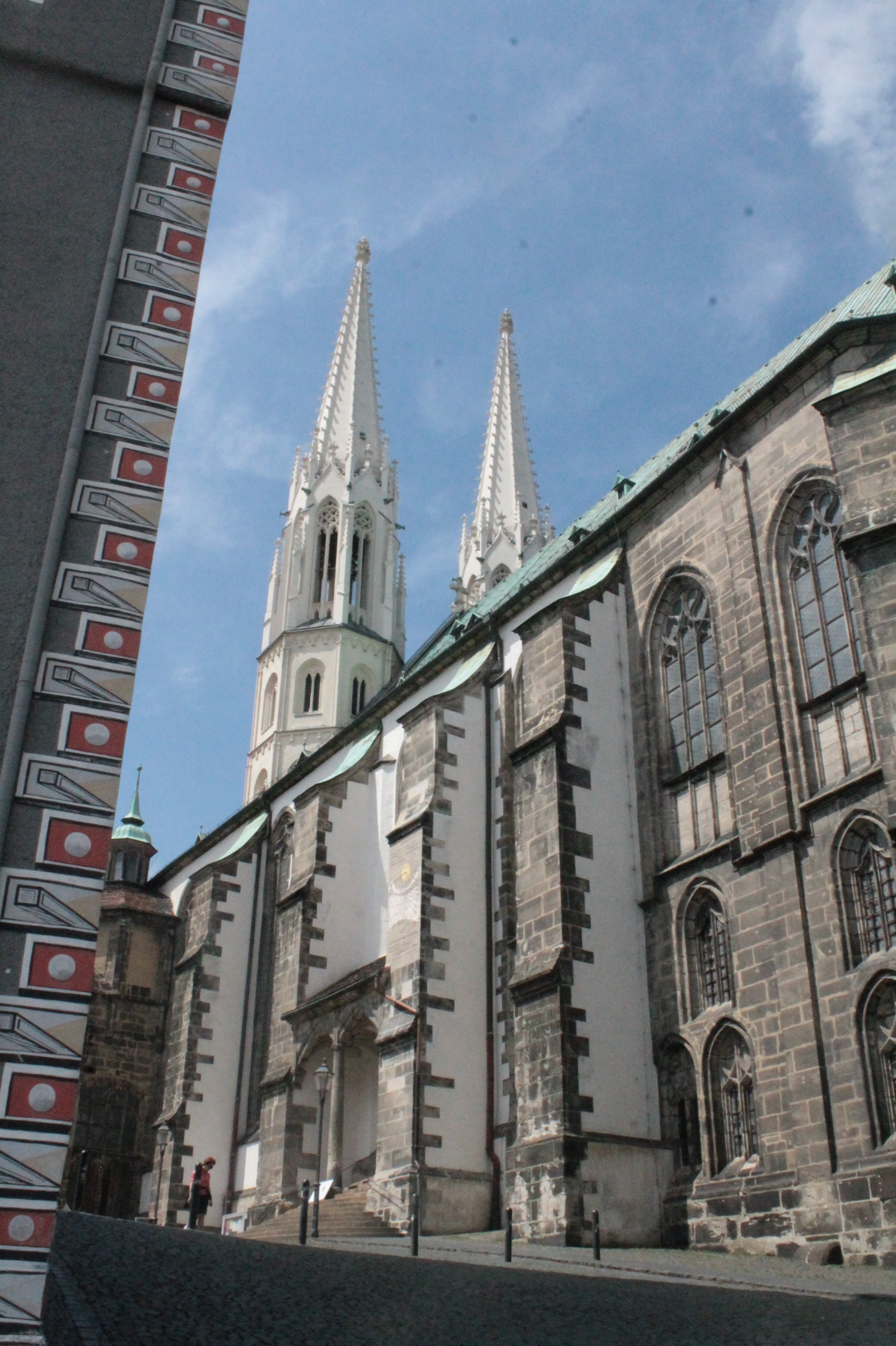
St. Peter and Paul

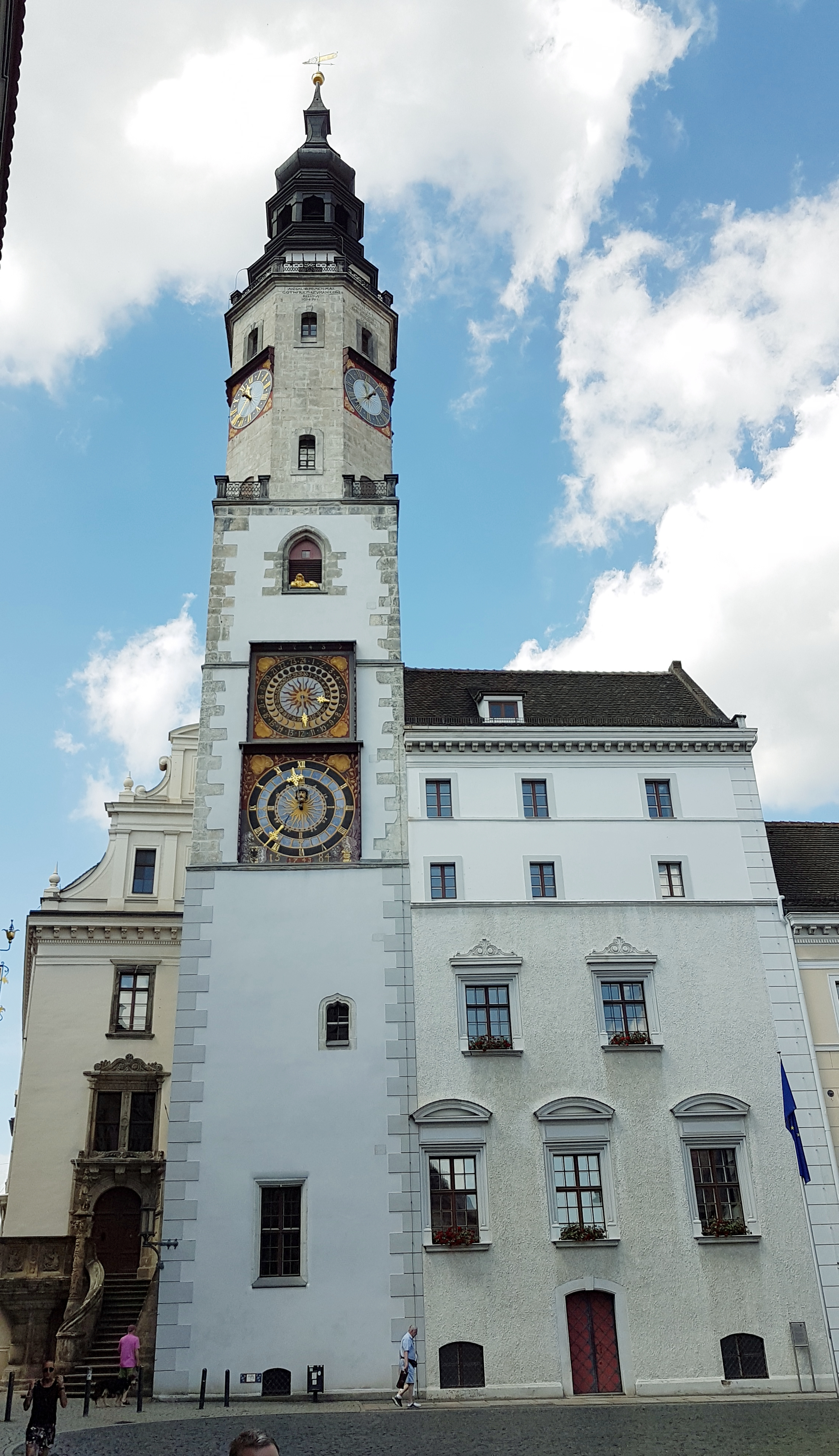
Old town hall

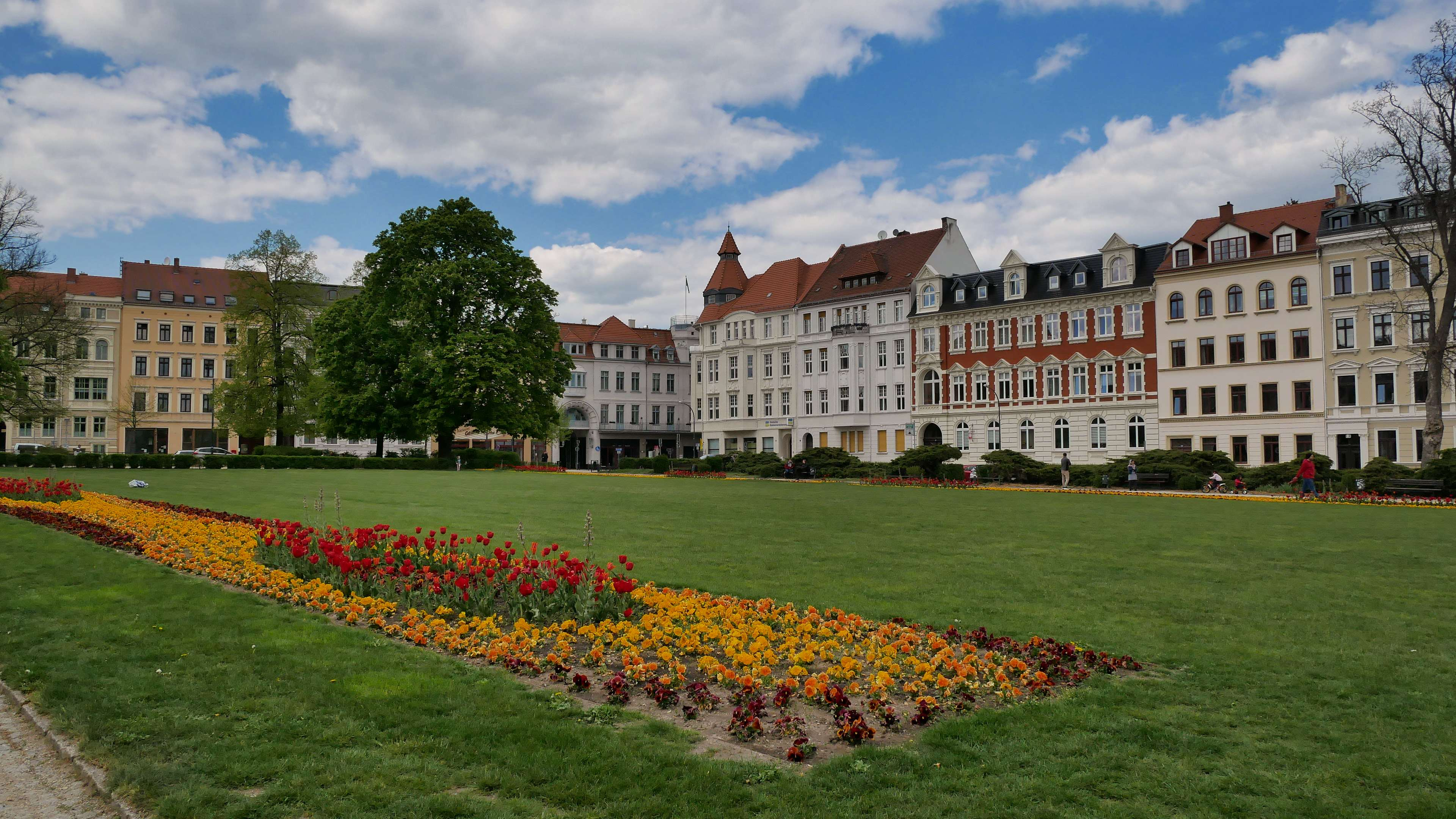
Wilhelmsplatz

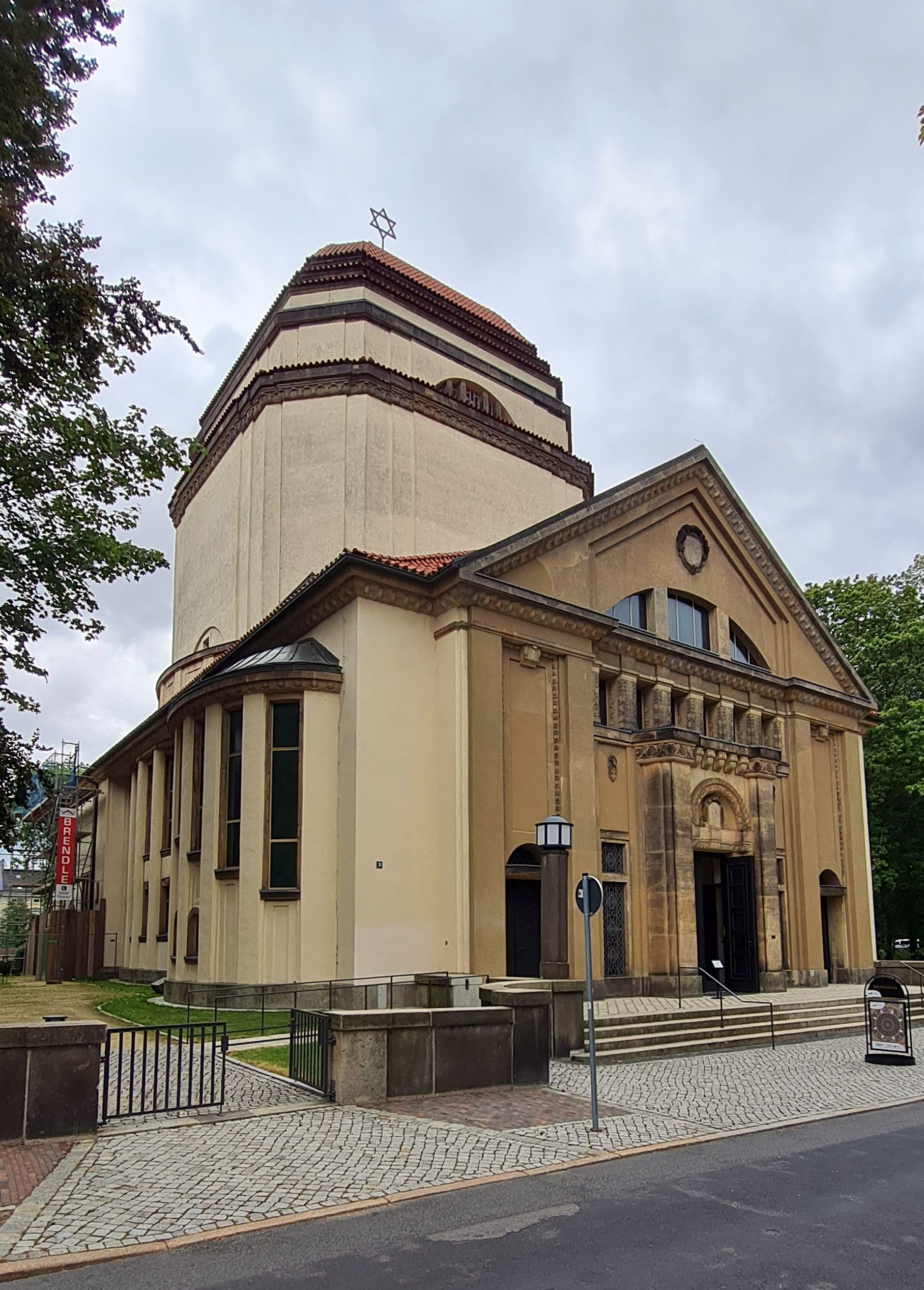
Görlitz Synagogue

== See also ==
- Ludwigsdorf
- Pließnitz
