= Lower Market Square (Görlitz) =

Square in Görlitz, Germany

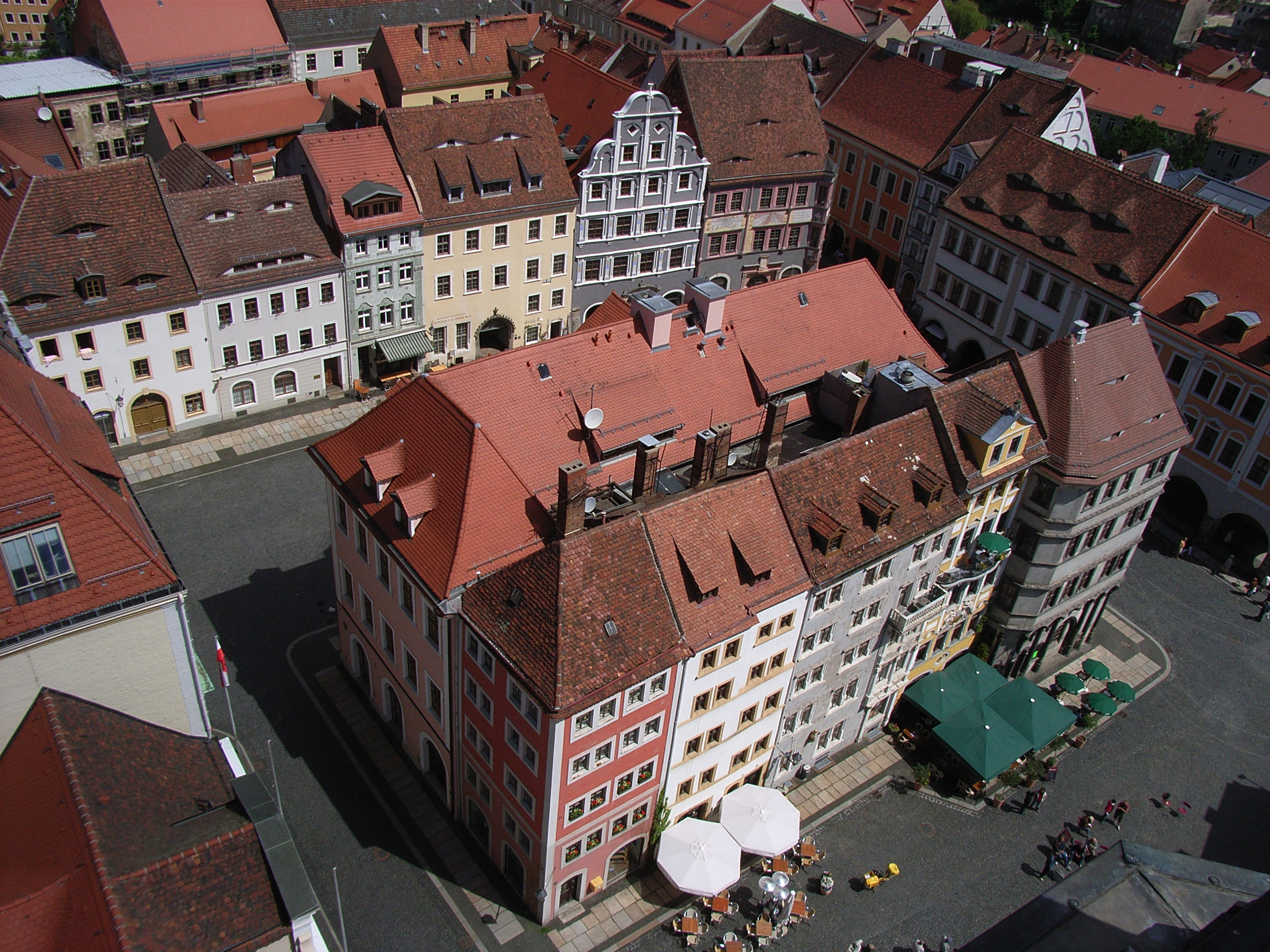
- View of the Lower Market from the town hall tower in northeast direction
- Interactive map of Lower Market Square
- Native name: Untermarkt (German)
- Location: Historic Town, Görlitz, Germany
- Coordinates: 51.15643424266268°N 14.990996209903638°E
- North: Peterstraße, Jüdenstraße
- East: Neißstraße
- South: Weberstraße
- West: Brüderstraße, Langenstraße

Construction
- Construction start: c. 1250

Other
- Known for: many Renaissance-style buildings, Silesian Museum, cities town hall, Upper Lusatian Library of Sciences
- Website: www.goerlitz.de/Denkmalhaeuser_-bauten.html

The Lower Market Square (Upper Sorbian: Delnje torhošćo) is the central square in the historic town of Görlitz. The city's town hall and thus most of the administration have been located on this square since 1350. Many of the city's Renaissance-styled buildings were built here.

== History ==
Görlitz is first mentioned in 1071. At that time, merchants settled around the Nikolai Church and along the Via Regia. Around 1200, the Lower Market Square was created and the Via Regia was passed through it. In 1250 the Upper Market Square was laid out. Since then the selling farmers stood mainly on this market, while the craftsmen stood on the Lower Market Square.

In the center of the Lower Market is the so-called Zeile (Row). Over the centuries, this was repeatedly changed structurally and today consists of a coherent block of houses. At that time, it housed merchants and grocers and offered space under the arcades to offer goods. The once half-timbered part on the northern side of the row was replaced in 1706 by a new administrative building, the so-called Börse. Merchants held their weekly meetings there. The building is now used as a hotel.

== Buildings ==
=== Town Hall ===
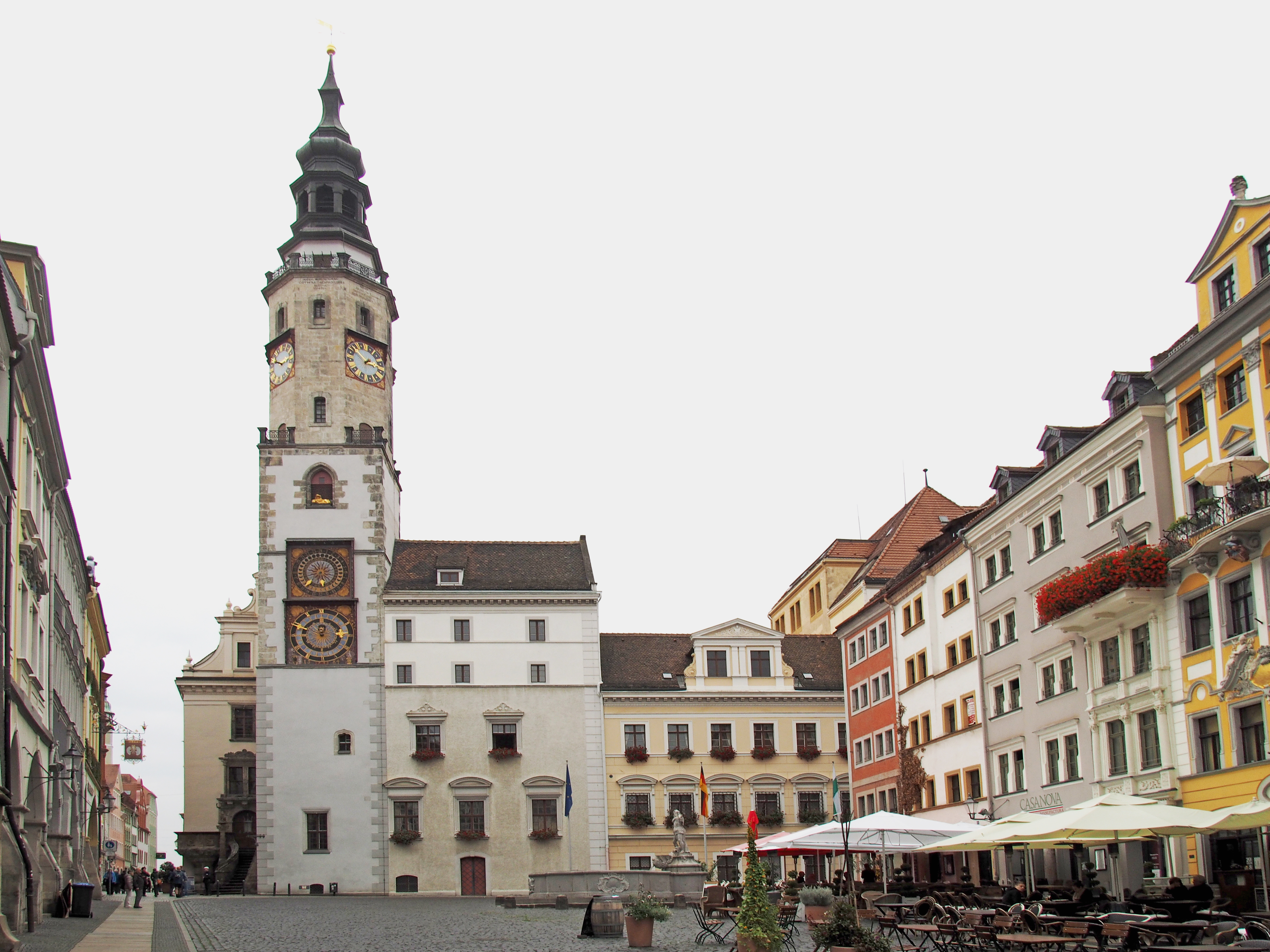
The Old Town Hall with clock tower on the Lower Market Square

The town hall has been the place of the cities administration and jurisdictions since 1350. It utilises several buildings of different epoches on the Lower Market Square 6–8. The tower dates back to 1378 (lower cubic part) and was raised in the 16th century to its present height. A lion (the heraldic animal of Bohemia) is located on top of two clocks in a gothic arch. The clocks were added 1584 by Bartholomäus Scultetus. In the corner between the tower and the Brüderstraße (Brethren Street) a renaissance-styled staircase was erected in 1537 by Wendel Roskopf. On the second floor in the building next to the tower is the seat of the mayor. In 1903 construction began for another building complex. The new town hall is a reminiscence of the 17th century Görlitz residential houses. The structure looks imposing and it displayed the spirit of the emerging city.

=== Brown Deer ===
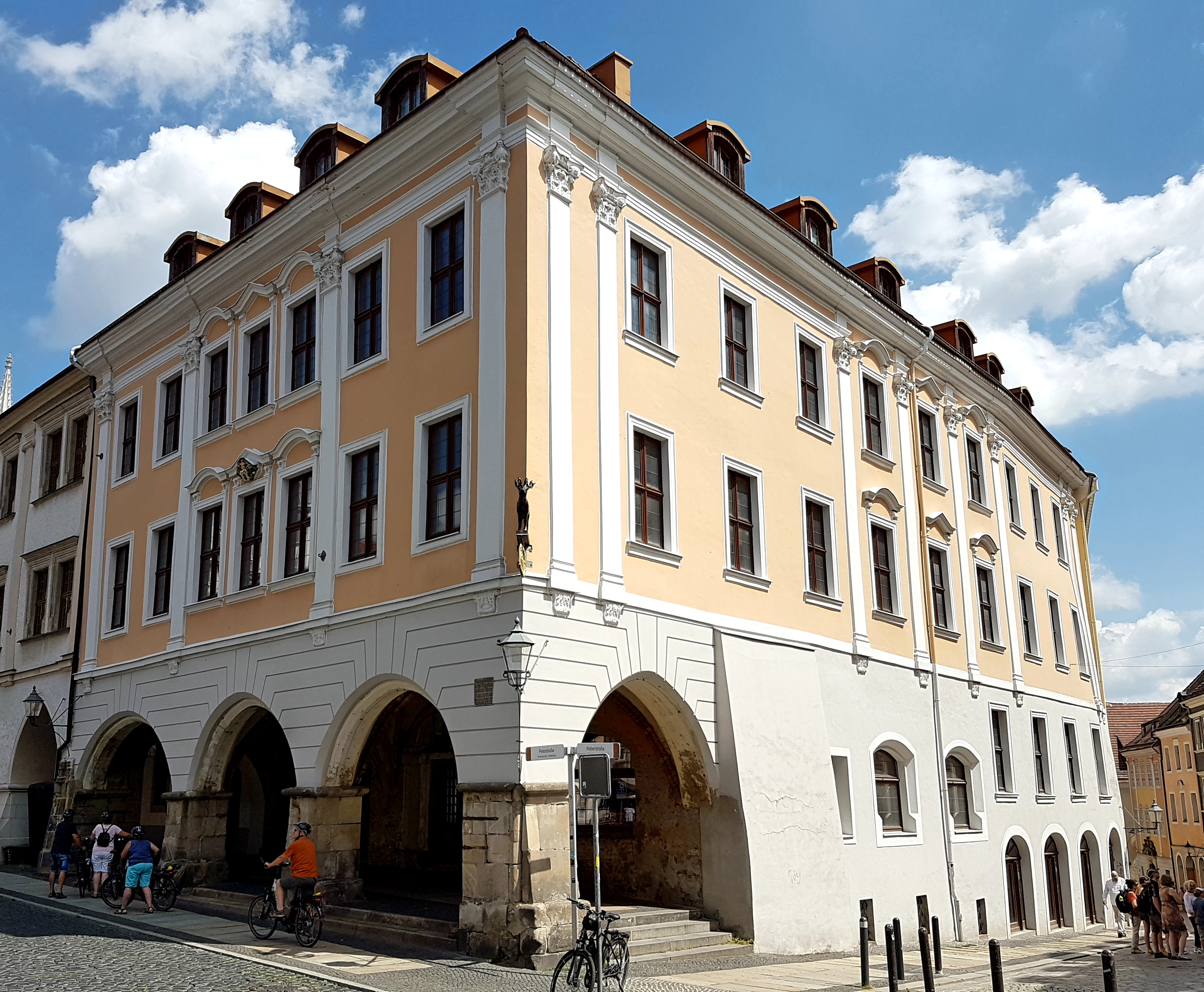
The baroque Brown Deer accomondated several affluent persons in the 19th century.

The Brauner Hirsch (Brown Deer) is first mentioned in 1403. It was for a long time one of the most distinguished inns and breweries of the city. In the 16th century the building underwent several reconstructions which are documented, among others, by one of the keystones of the portico vaults (Michel Schmid - 1539) and remains of a painted wooden beam ceiling on the 1st floor (1593). However much of the building burned down in city fire 1717 and was reconstructed in 1722, thus the baroque exterior. The pharmacist Leopold Pape made many changes inside the building in 1818. The building was still used for accomondating affluent visitors, including Jérôme Bonaparte (1812), Gebhard Leberecht von Blücher (3 and 4 September 1813), Frederick William III of Prussia (1835), Frederick William IV of Prussia (1831, 1833, 1840,1844), Nicholas I of Russia (1838), Alexander II of Russia (1840), Archduke John of Austria (1848), the German Emperor William I (1819), Prince Friedrich Karl of Prussia (1866, got his headquarters here during the war).

=== Frenzelhof ===
The Frenzelhof is one of the typical Görlitz hall houses. First mentioned in the 15th century, it was bought in 1500 by the influential merchant Hans Frenzel. He had a fireproof and painted vault built. The vault has been preserved until today. In the two central halls extending over two floors, goods were presented in daylight and protected from rain. In the following centuries, the owners and uses changed and construction work was carried out. Between 1760 and 1813 the building was in a poor shape and probably unoccupied. After 1813 the gothic gable and the baroque facade has been replaced. Today the building is used as a hotel.

=== Council Pharmacy ===
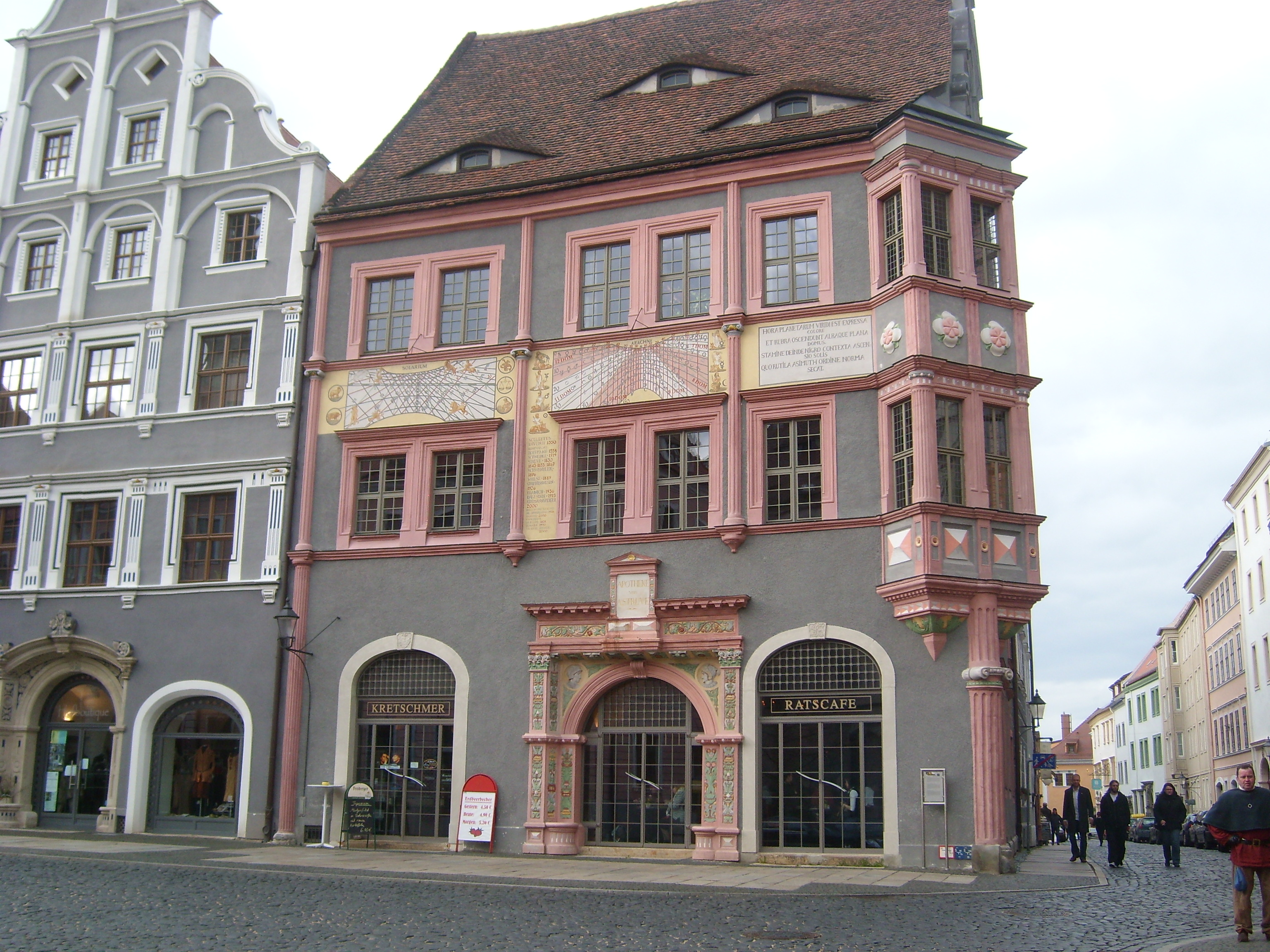
Councils Pharmacy

The Ratsapotheke (Council Pharmacy or Town Hall Pharmacy) is a building from 1453 and was modernized in 1550 to 1553 by the son of Wendel Roskopf to follow the Renaissance style. Zacharias Scultetus, the brother of the mathematician Bartholomäus Scultetus added an astronomical drawing and the sundial above the first floor during this time. Inside the building several painted wooden beam ceilings are preserved. The name Ratsapotheke can be derived from two similar meanings. The pharmacy in Görlitz was first mentioned in 1305 and belonged to a member of a council (Ratsmitglied) and was located inside the cities town hall. Therefore, the name Ratsapotheke (councils pharmacy). The other interpretation is, that the pharmacist Christian August Struve bought this building and relocated his pharmacy from the town hall into this building. Therefore, the name shortened over time from Rathausapotheke (town hall pharmacy) to Ratsapotheke. Until 1832 it was the only pharmacy in the city. During restoration works in 1999 the bricked Renaissance portal was revealed again with some fragments of the original colours. Since 2000 a cafe, the Ratscafe (Councils Cafe), is inside the building.

=== Scales ===
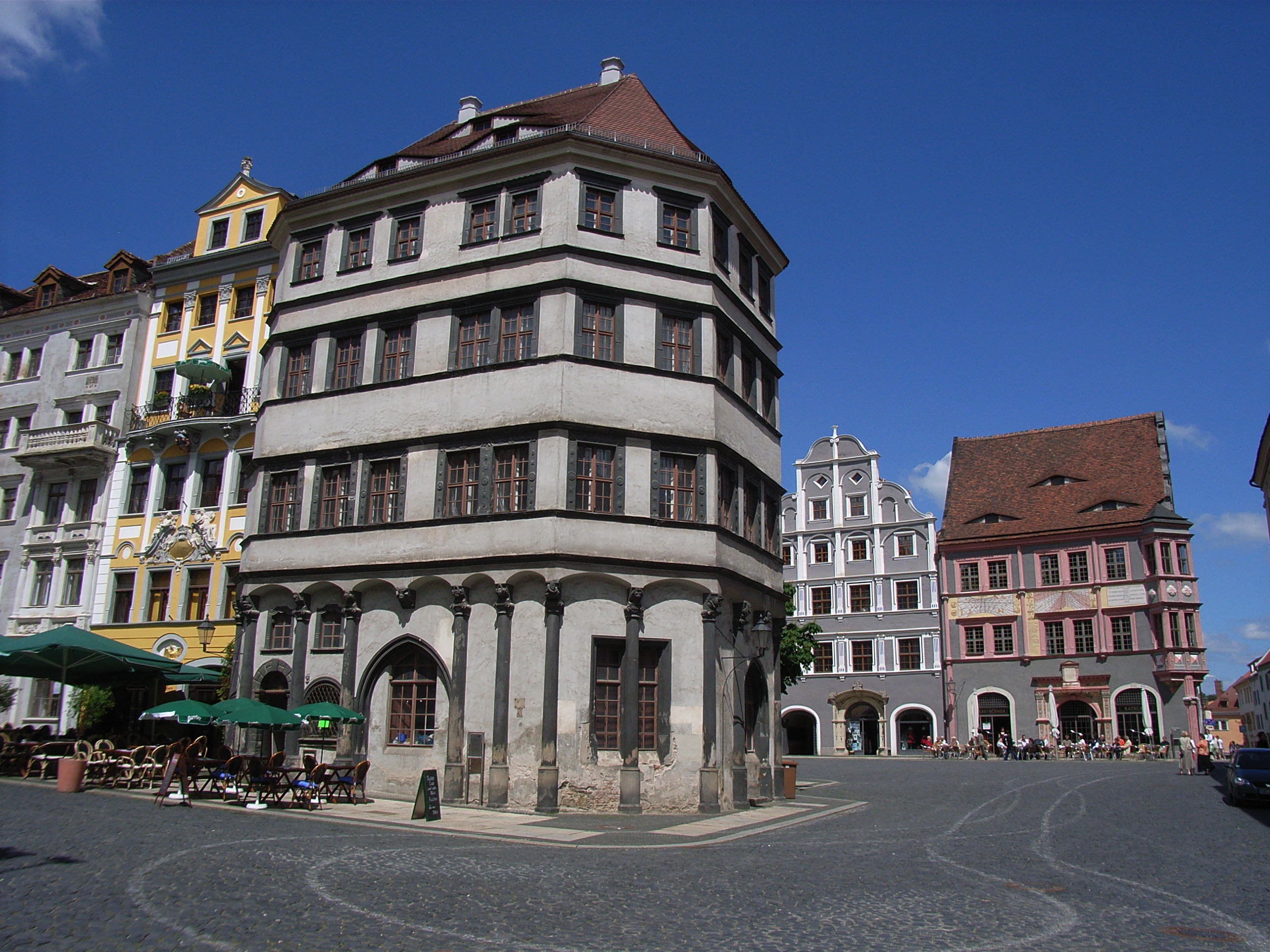
Waage ('Scales'); all incoming goods were weighted here.

The Waage (Scales) was the building in the town where all incoming goods were weighted and cleared. The ground-floor probably dates back to 1453. The rest of the building was constructed by Jonas Roskopf, the son of Wendel Roskopf in Renaissance-style in 1600. The building kept its function to collect Octroi until 1823. After that the trade association, founded in 1830, met in the premises and used them for exhibitions until they moved to the Humboldt House, completed in 1871. The building was refurbished in the 1980s and is currently unused.

=== Schönhof ===
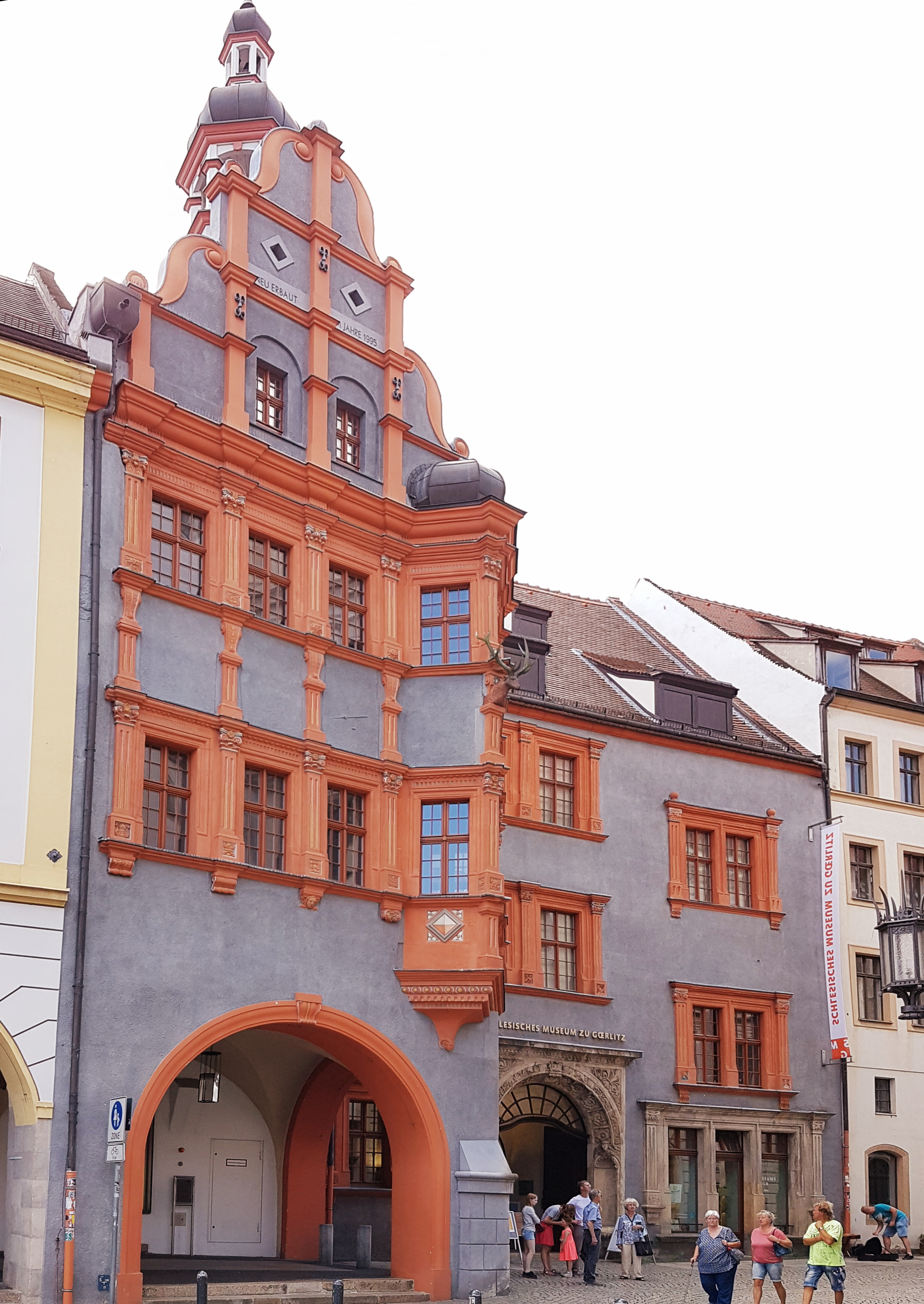
Schönhof

The Schönhof was the first Renaissance-building in the city built the year after a devastating town fire in 1525 by Wendel Roskopf. Being opposite to the town hall, close to merchant houses and on the trade route Via Regia, it was specifically built to serve as a royal guesthouse. It accomondated Elector of Saxony John George II and King of Bohemia Wenceslaus IV. A central hall inside the building extends over all floors, thus the house corresponds to the type of a Görlitz hall house. Since 2006 the Silesian Museum uses the premises of building.

=== Barockhaus ===
The Barockhaus (House of Baroque) located on the corner between Handwerk street and Neisse street was built shortly after the town fire in 1726 in baroque-style. The owner Johann Christian Ameiß was a linen and damask trader from Zittau. Powered by the ideas of enlightenment Adolf Traugott von Gersdorff and Karl Gottlob Anton founded the Upper Lusatian Society of Science and bought the house in 1804 to move their Upper Lusatian Library of Sciences into the building. The society had their headquarters in this building until 1945. Since 1951 the city of Görlitz is the owner of the building and uses it to this day to make the library available for public.

== Gallery ==
Buildings

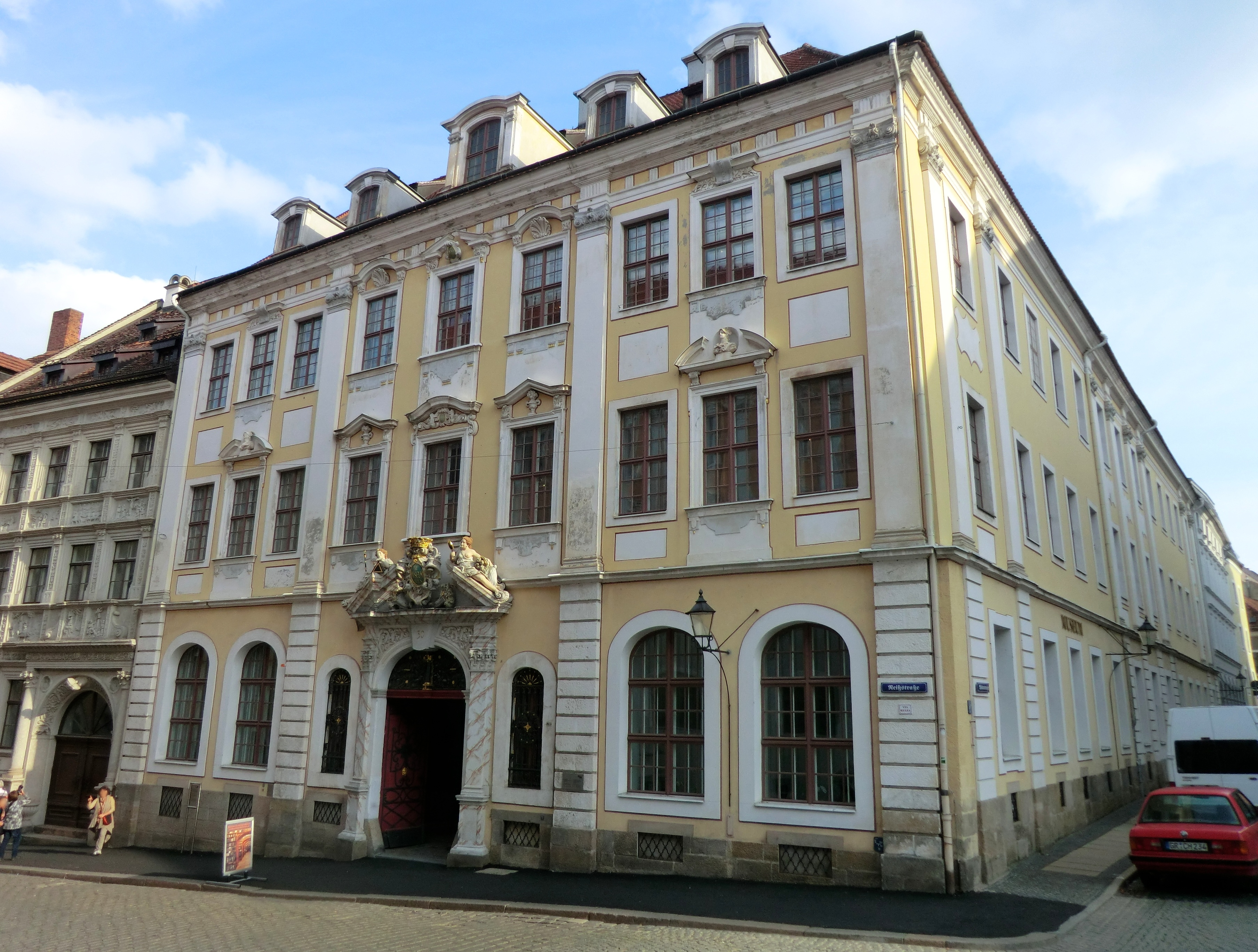
Barockhaus (House of Baroque) containing the Upper Lusatian Library of Sciences since 1804

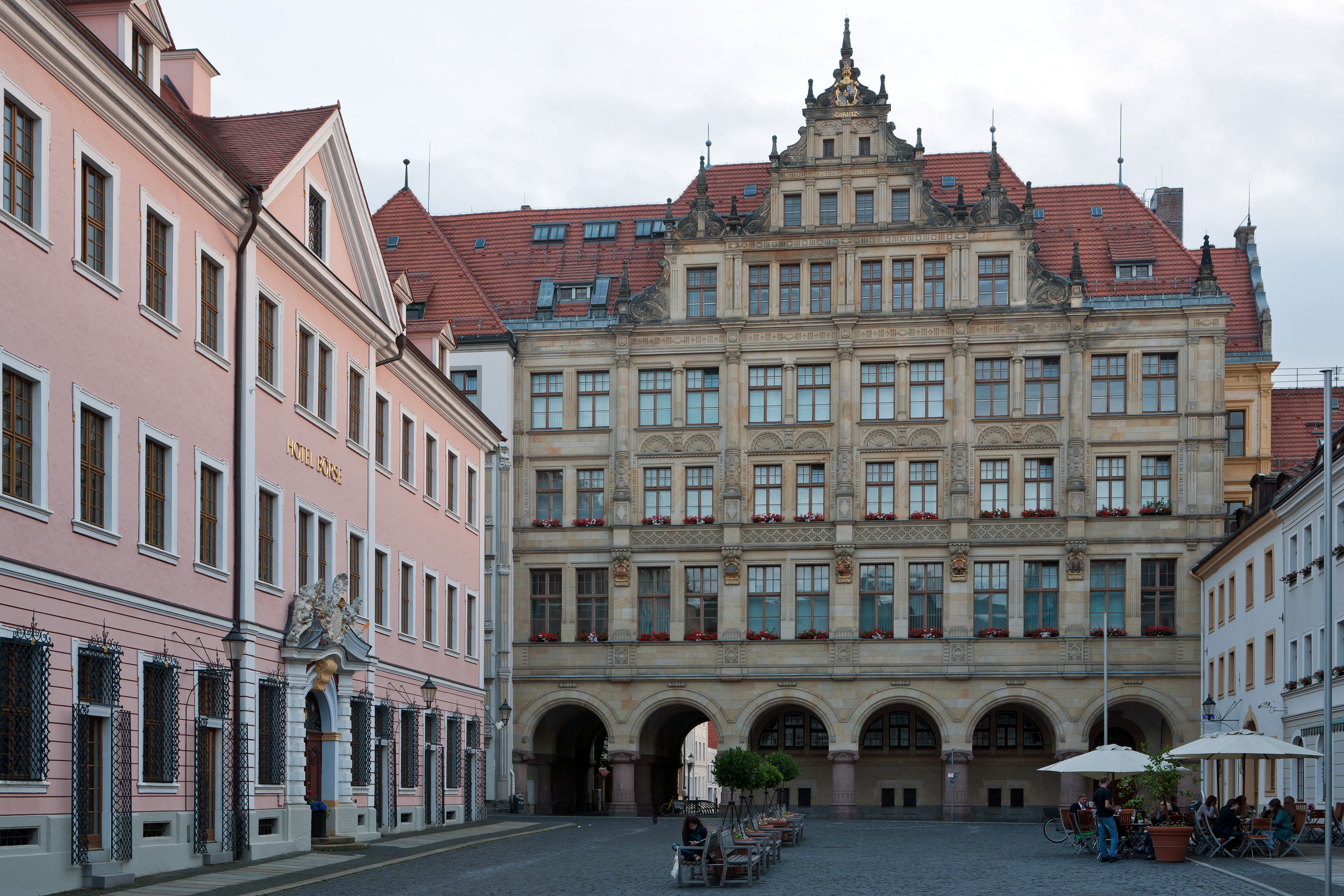
New Town hall

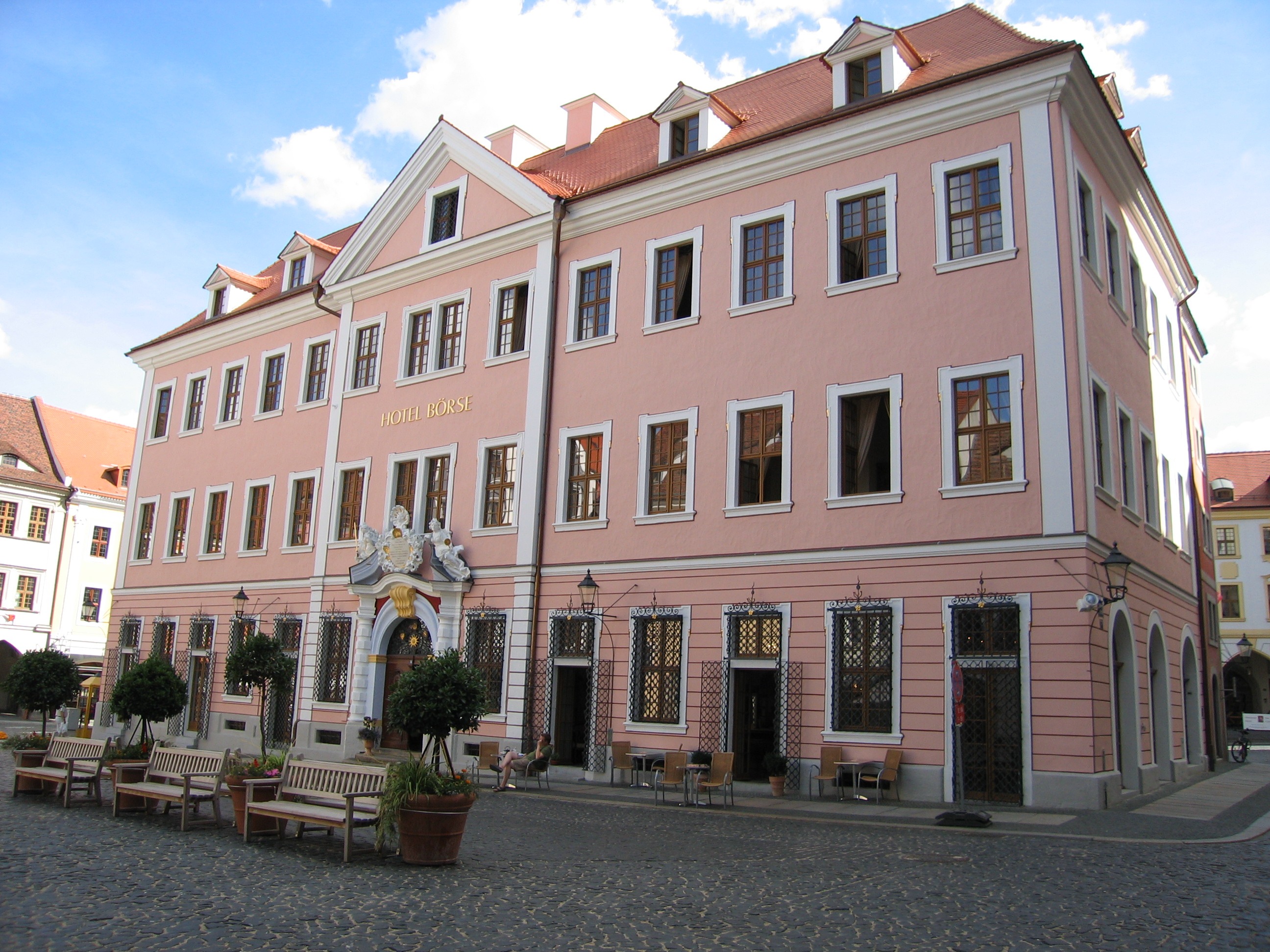
Hotel Börse

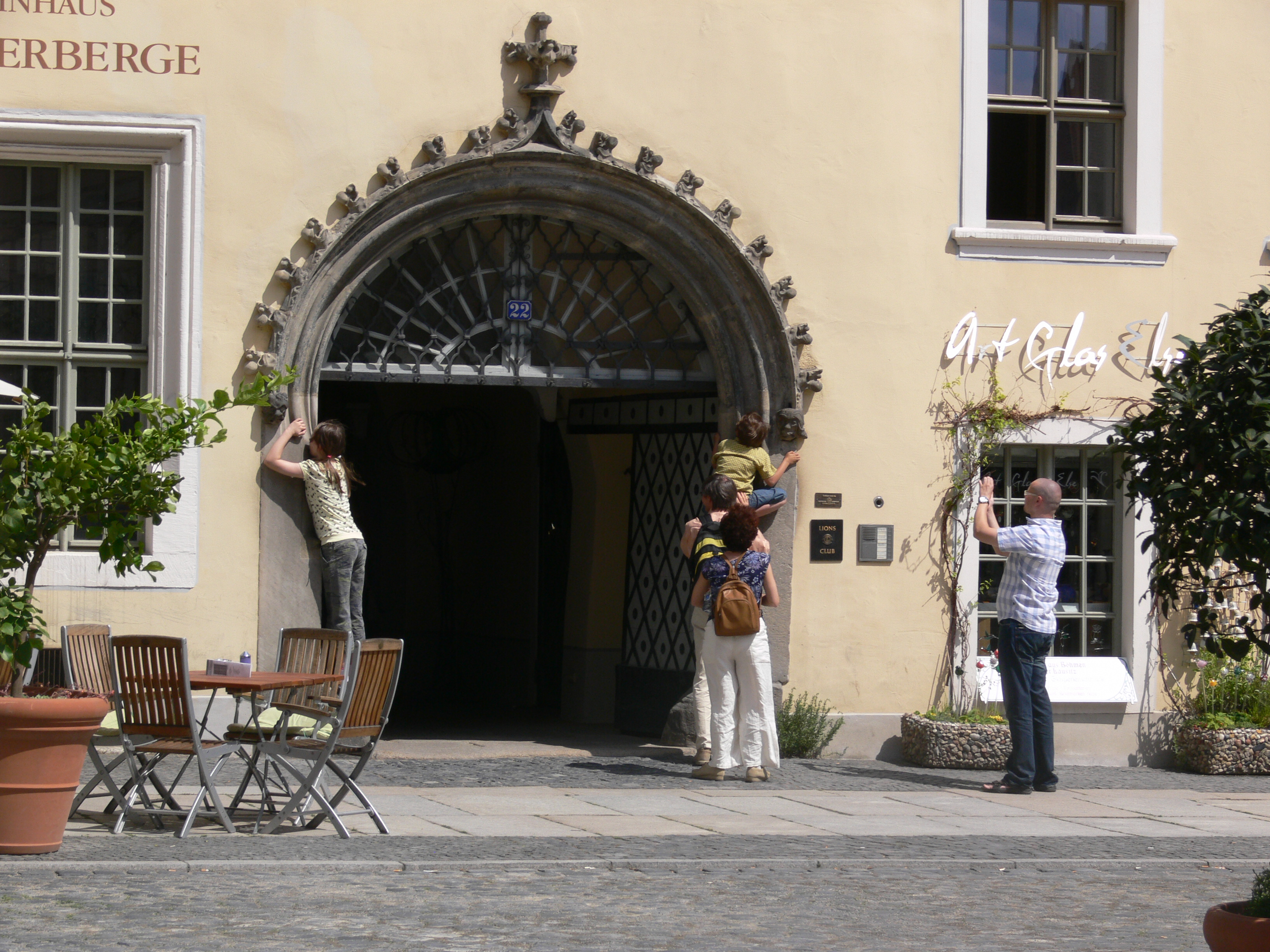
Flüsterbogen ('Whispering Arch')

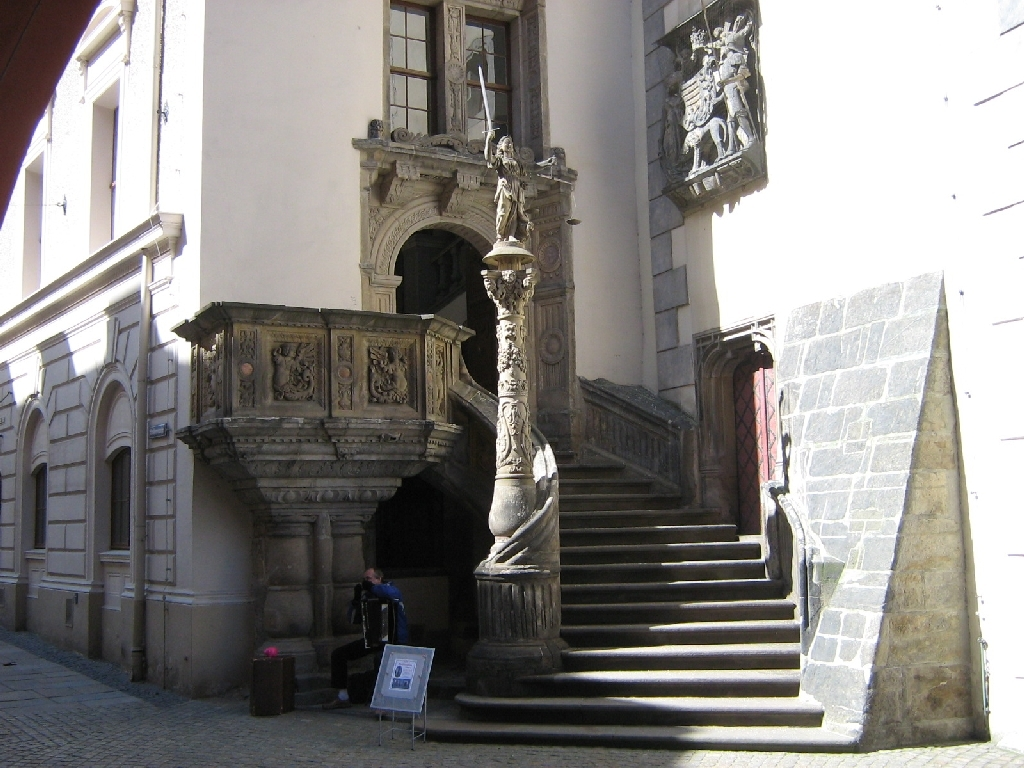
Town Hall Staircase with Lady Justice

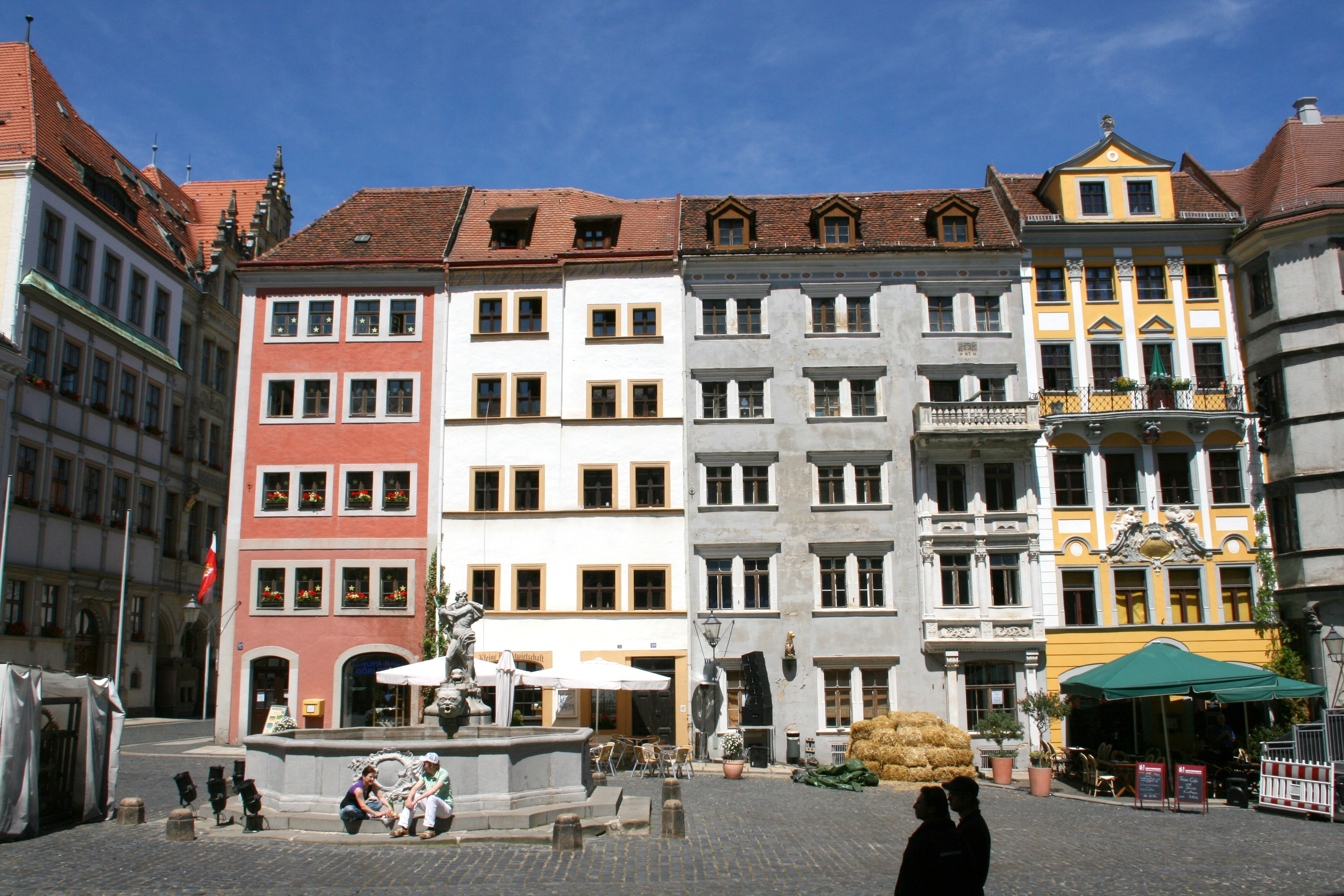
Zeile ('The Row') with Neptune fountain

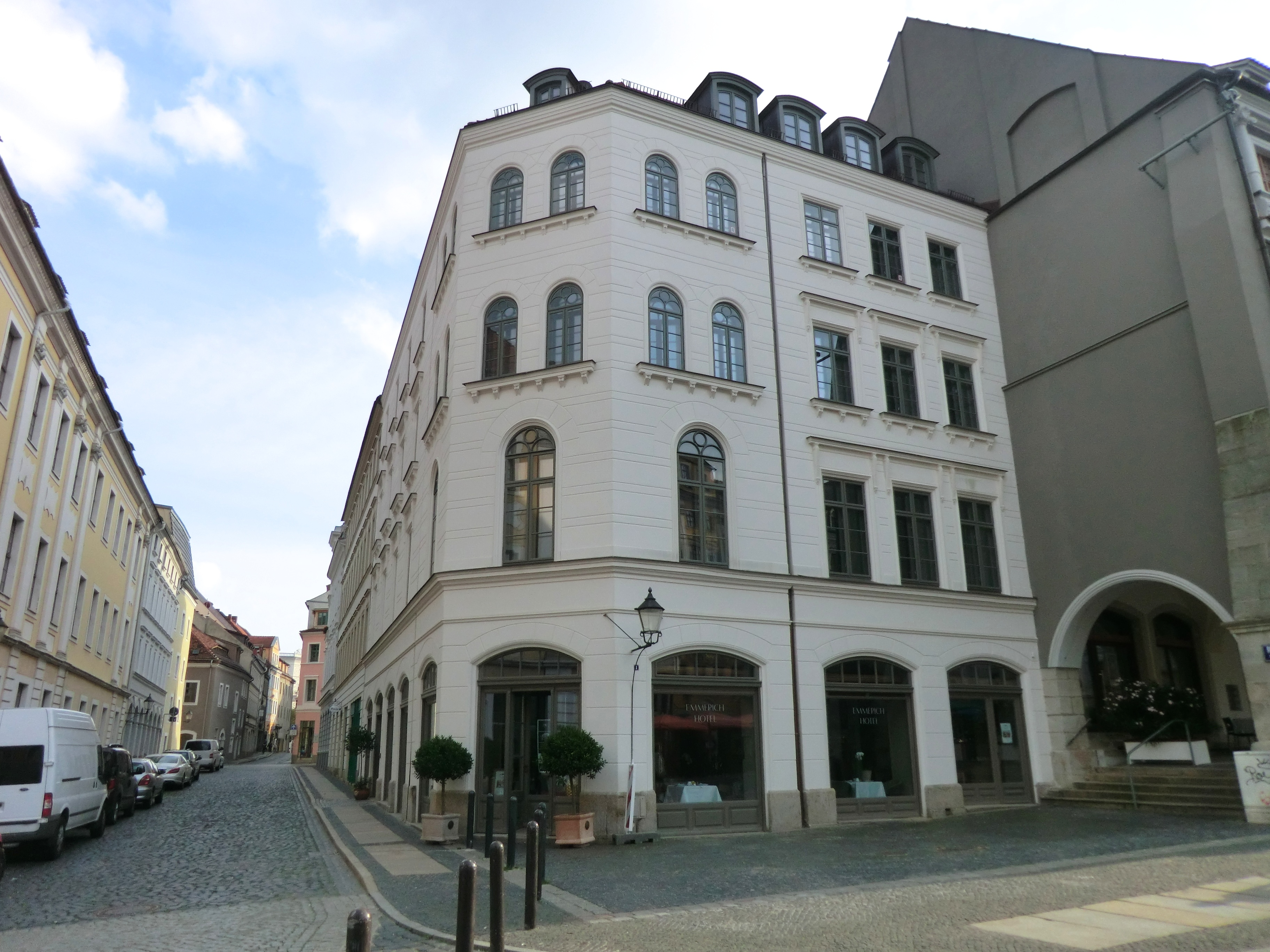
Hotel Emmerich

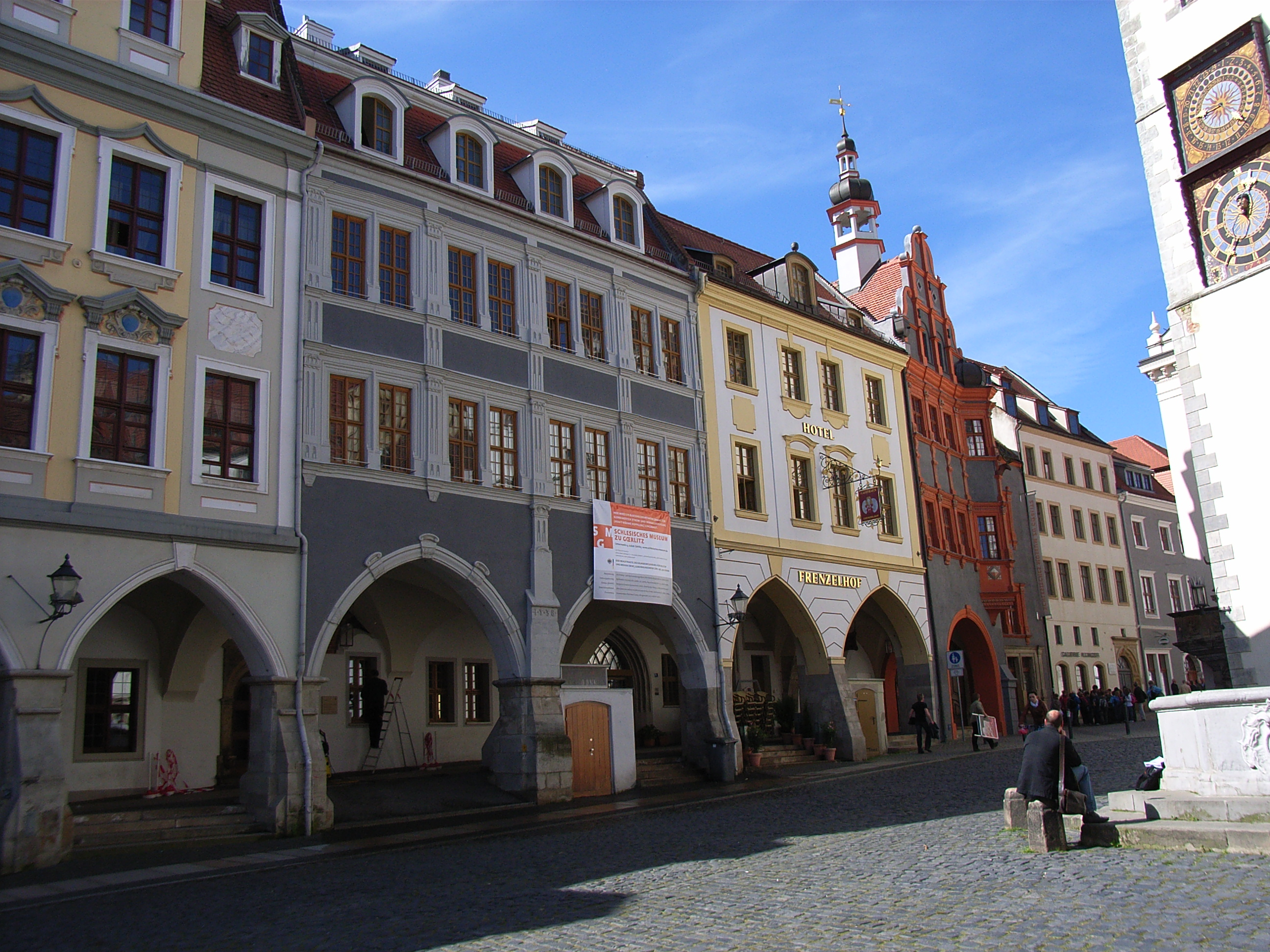
Goldener Baum ('Golden Tree'), Frenzelhof and Silesian Museum
