= Town Hall of Görlitz =

Historic building in Görlitz, Germany

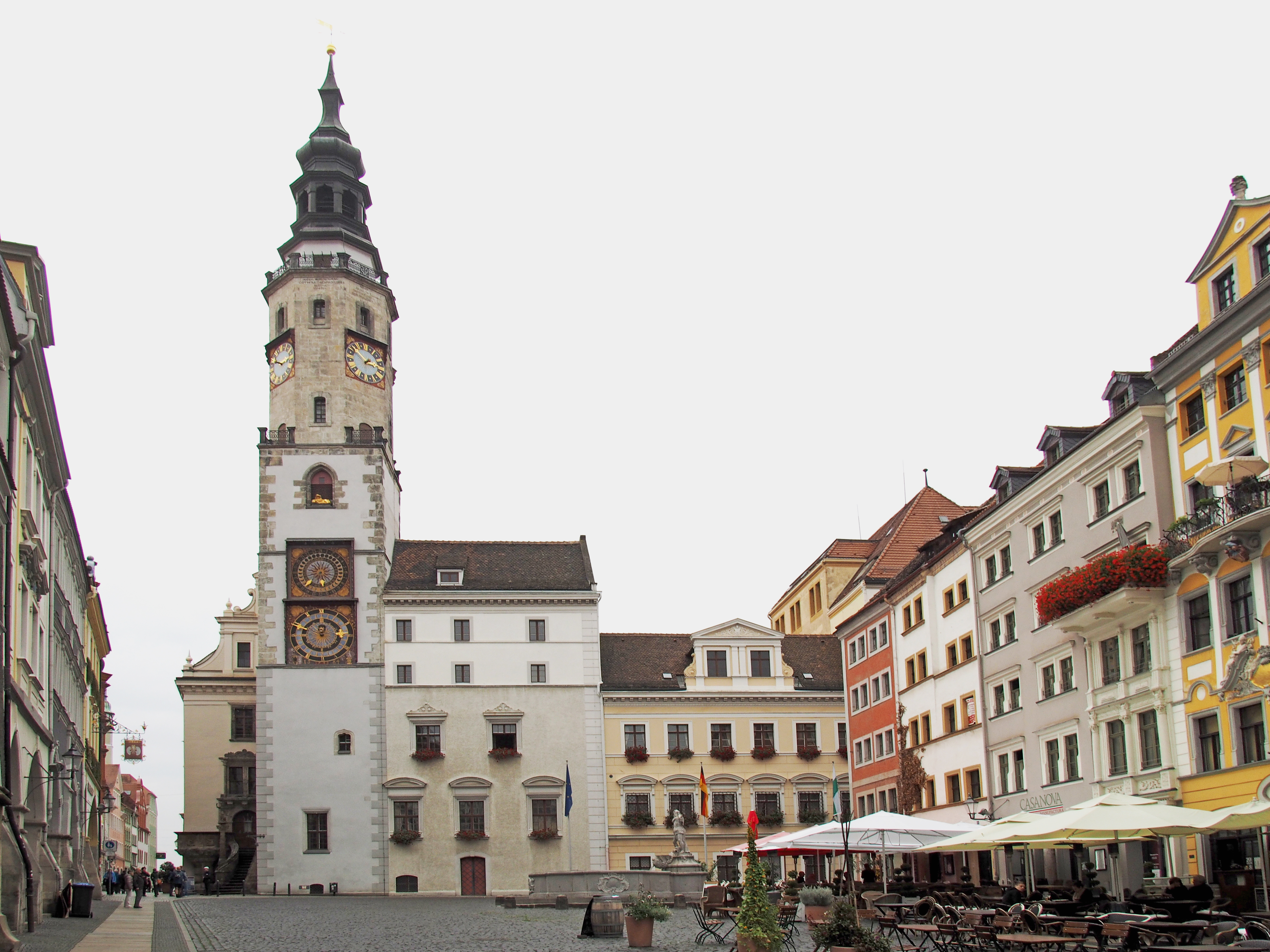
The Old Town Hall with clock tower on the Lower Market Square- both the oldest parts of the town hall

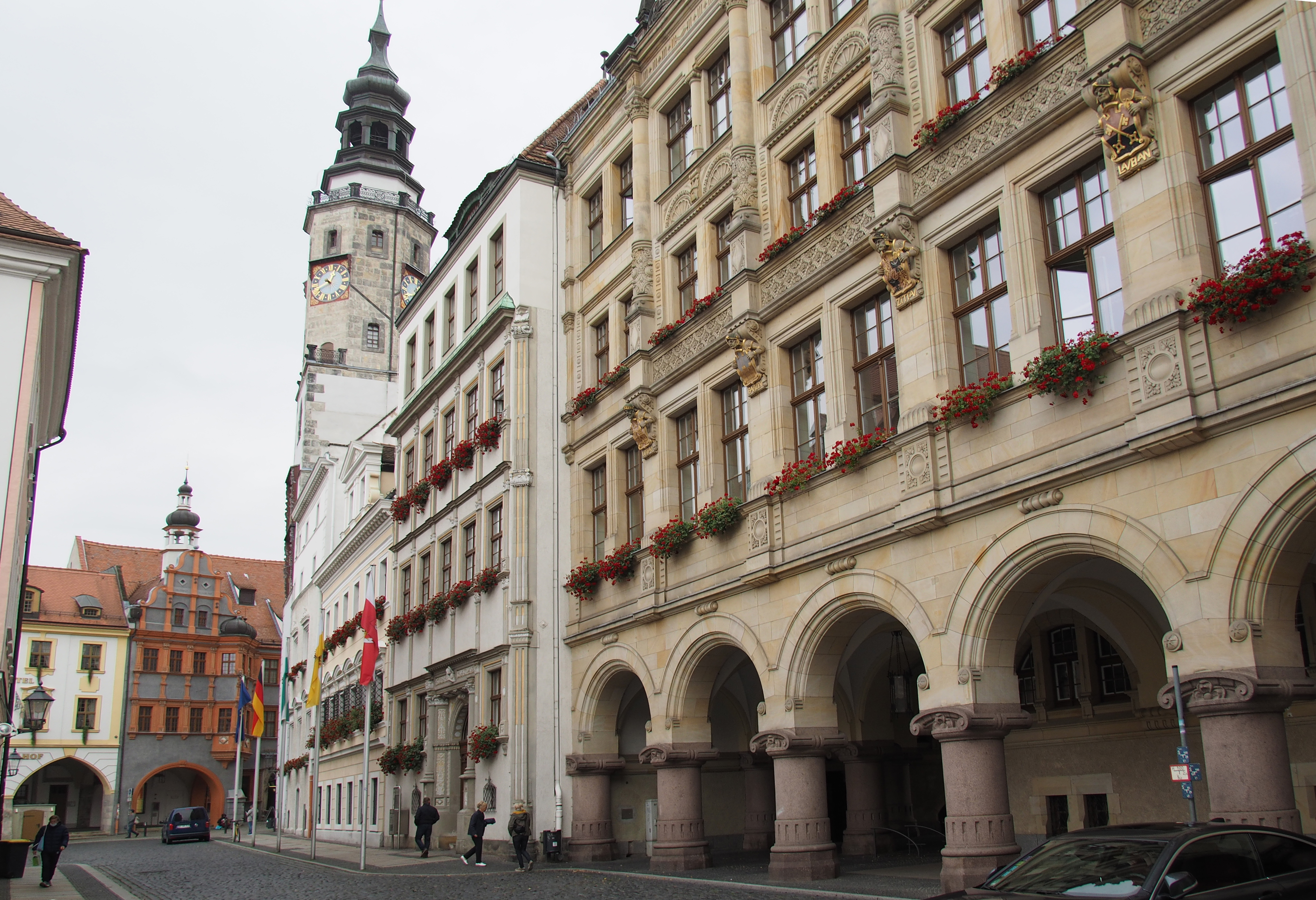
A complete view of the Town Hall of Görlitz with multiple historic buildings of different eras

The Town Hall of Görlitz has been the place of the city's administration and jurisdictions since 1350. It was first mentioned in a document by the Görlitz council in 1369. Its interior dates back partly to the Renaissance period and baroque period. Over the centuries the administration grew, so did the town hall. It utilises several buildings of different epoches on the Lower Market Square 6–8.

The town hall tower was raised in the 16th century, in 1524 a clock with two dials was added. Those were modified in 1584 by Bartholomäus Scultetus who joined the mechanisms of the day time clock with the upper moon phase clock. Wendel Roskopf the Elder built a council besides the staircase. In 1591 a stone Lady Justice was added - a symbol of high Jurisdiction of the cities council.

The heraldic relief from 1488 by King Matthias Corvinus of Hungary and Bohemia indicates the affiliation to Upper Lusatia. In 1903 the new town hall extension building in Renaissance Revival architecture was finished.

== Origin ==
In the 13th century, bohemian magistrates, noble families and craftsman lived closely together. Multiple courtyards spread across the small city. The noble families and rich merchants married to form lineages. A civil administration consisting of council members has been established in 1264, lay judges exist since 1273 and the first mayor came to office in 1282, later leading to a council constitution. With the new rights, the city administration got more and more disentangled from the bohemian administration.

In 1303, Görlitz got the town privilege and began the plannings of an administration building. During this time a wooden construction was the place of administration. Due to a lack of space, they decided against a completely new building and instead decided to purchase an existing boehmian courtyard in the southwest of the Lower Market Square in 1350.

In 1369 the town hall was first mentioned in a report by the Görlitz council to the Emperor Charles IV, when a craftmans revolt was described:

Do besapten si sich noch stercker und kommen vor das Rathaus…

They got more drunk and come to the town hall...

— Görlitz city council, 1369

== History ==
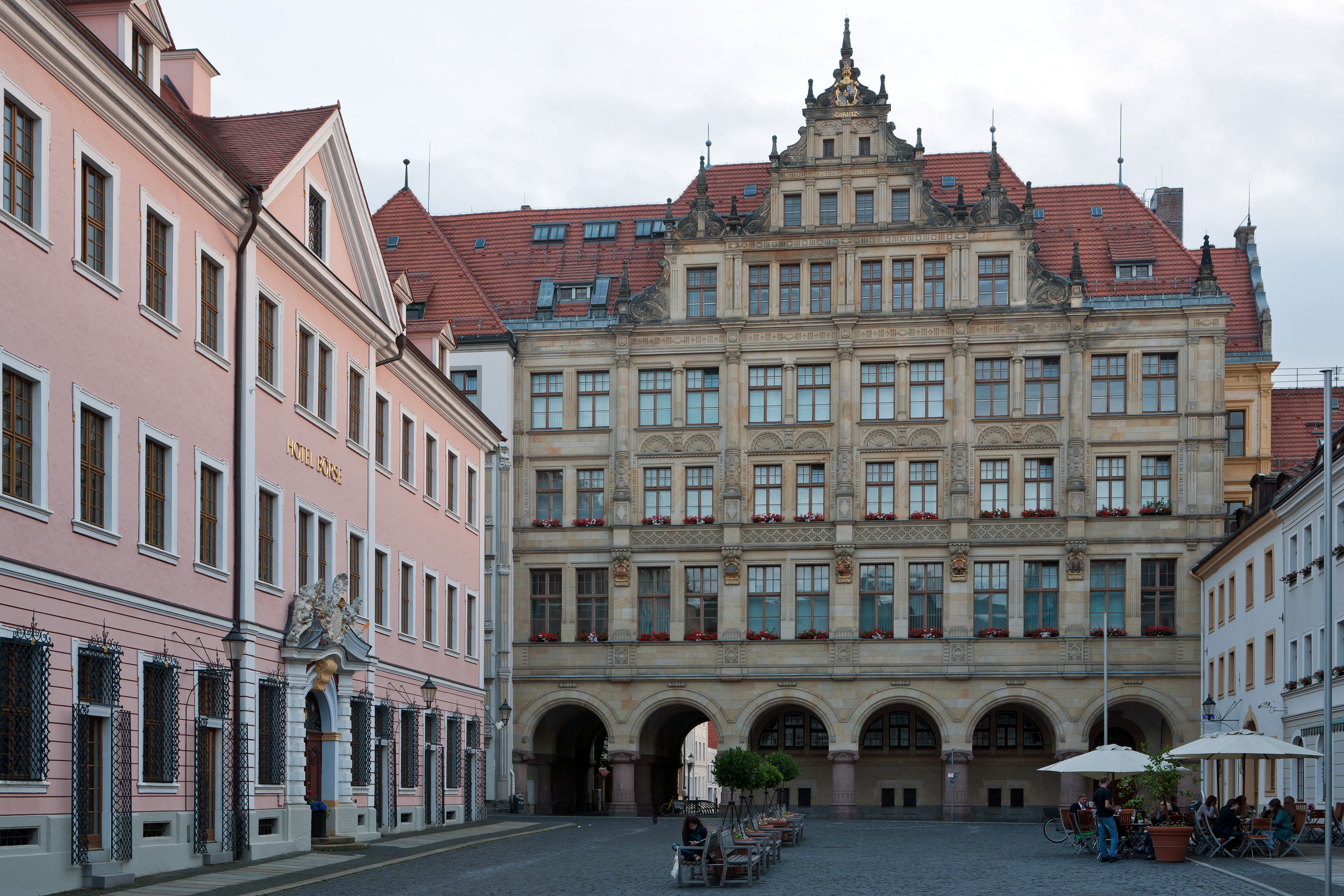
View from the Lower Market Square on the New Town Hall in Renaissance Revival style

The town hall features architectural styles from many eras. Both the interior and exterior have been altered several times over the centuries or have had to make way for more contemporary buildings.

=== Lower Market Square 6 ===
Lower Market Square 6 is the oldest part of the town hall. It consists of the lower part of the tower and the building on the northern side. Originally, the building was the residence of a bohemian servant, dating back to pre-Gothic times, thus it contains one of the oldest building stocks of the town. The facade was mostly unplastered. Thus, one could examine the carefully crafted colorful joints of the brick structure.

There were two large pointed arch openings on the second floor of the building. They date back to gothic times and one can find them on old drawings. The room behind served as the mayor's official residence and was recognizable as such from the outside due to its high location.

In the beginning of the 16th century the building was raised in Gothic style. Further reconstruction measures were carried out in the 19th century axially aligned the window heights of the upper floors.

=== Town Hall Tower ===
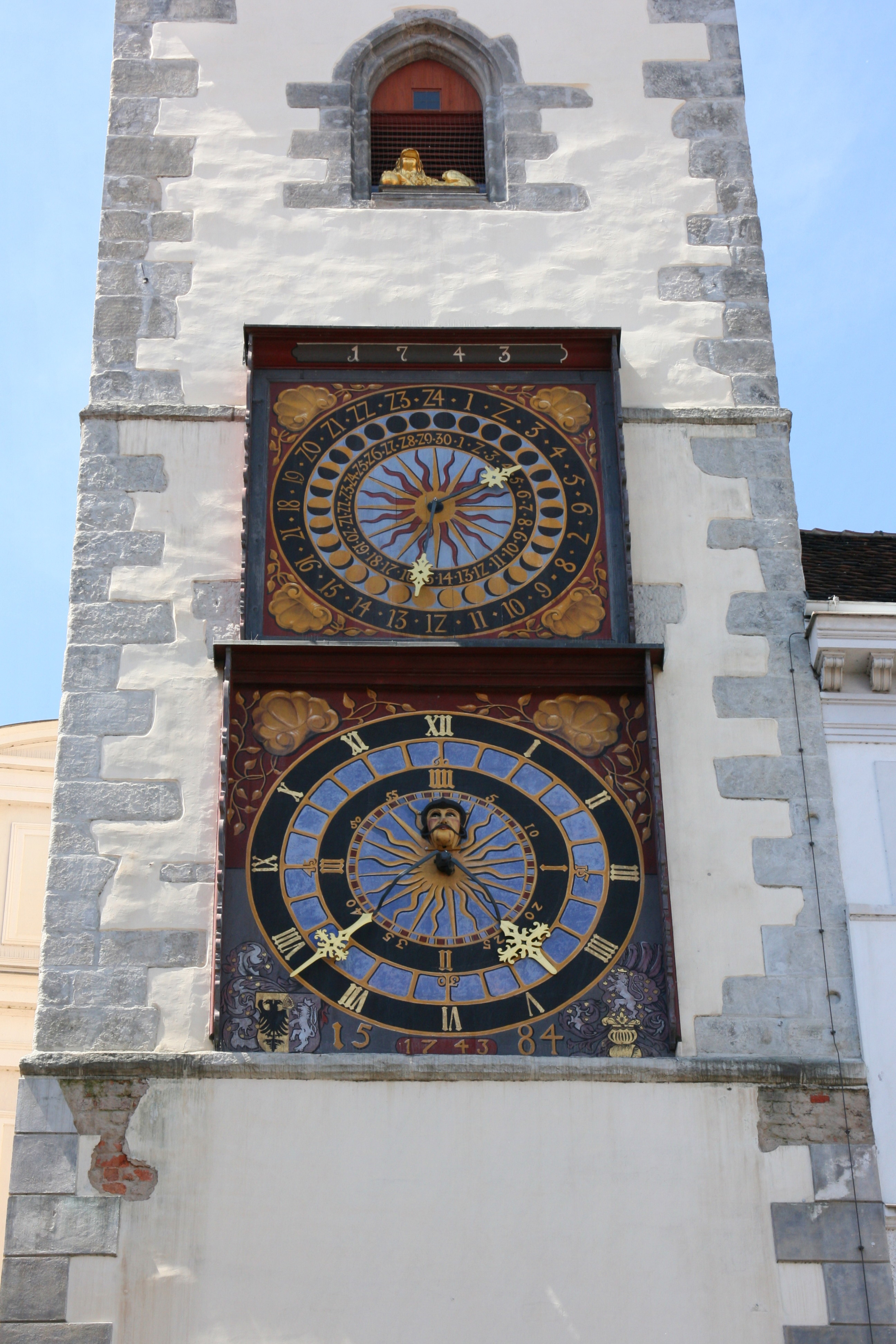
The two clocks and the lion on the tower

The Turret was first mentioned in 1378. In 1511 to 1516 the tower was raised by superintendent of city construction Albrecht Stieglitzer to today's height. He justified the expansion that it would provide a better overview and better protection for the city. In 1524 a clock with two dials was added. Those were modified in 1584 by Bartholomäus Scultetus who joined the mechanisms of the day time clock with the upper moon phase clock. The lower clock has a head of a city guard in the center of the dial. According to legend, he was walled in alive inside the tower, because he overslept a town fire. Every minute the head opens his eyes and they begin to shine orange. This resembles the fire. In fear he opens his mouth.

A lion (the heraldic animal of Bohemia) is located on top of the two clocks in a gothic arch. First mentioned in 1564, it was supposed to scare away thieves with its powerful roar at midnight with the help of an organ. The historian Richard Jecht reports the lions roar was deactivated, because "pregnant woman were freightened" by it.

On 9. July 1742 a lightning strike destroyed the upper parts of the tower, which were reconstructed shortly afterwards. Two new upper clocks and two bells were added as well by Friedrich Körner from Sorau/Żary. In 1917 during World War I the bells were melt down for war production. A plaster cast of the larger one is preserved to this day and is located in the bay window of the town hall.

Today, the town hall tower can be visited and offers a view of Görlitz.

=== Town Hall Staircase ===
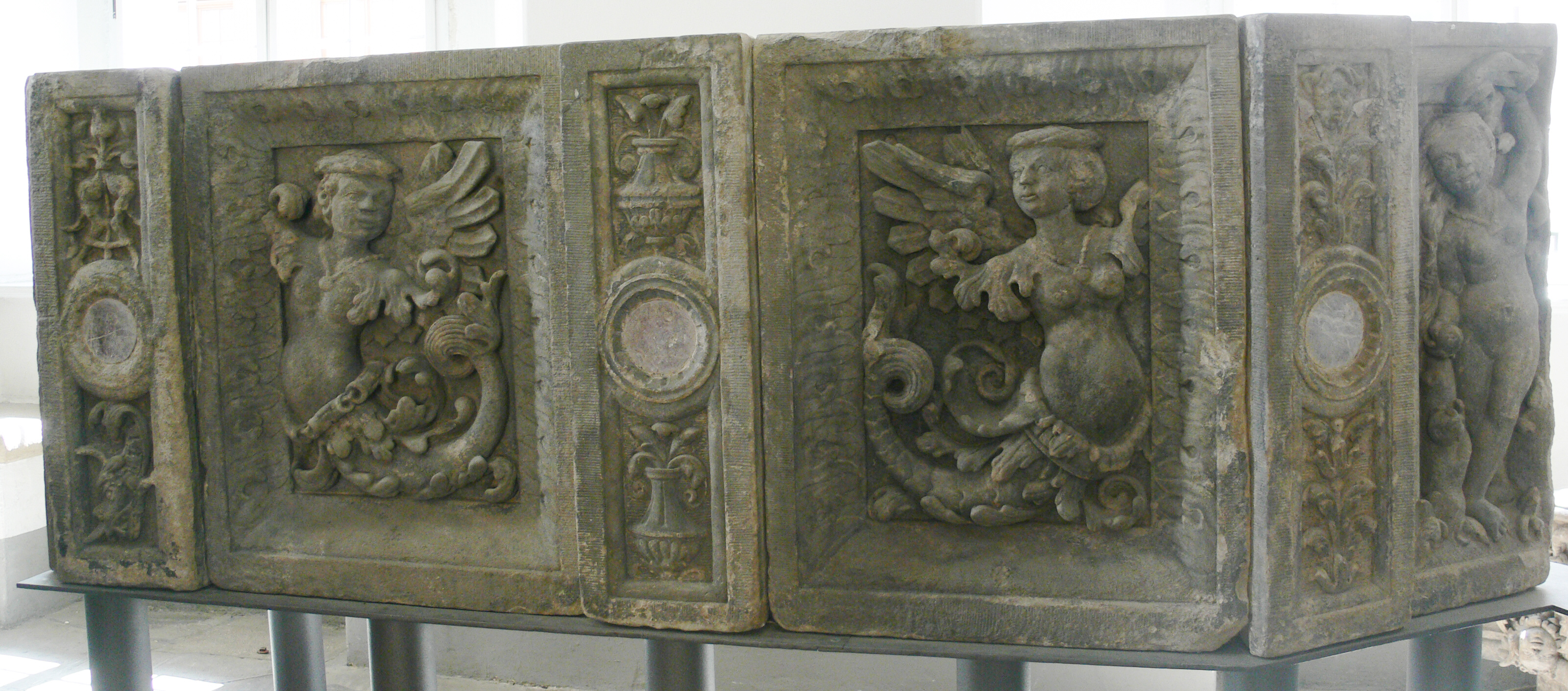
Historic relief of the staircase, now located inside the building

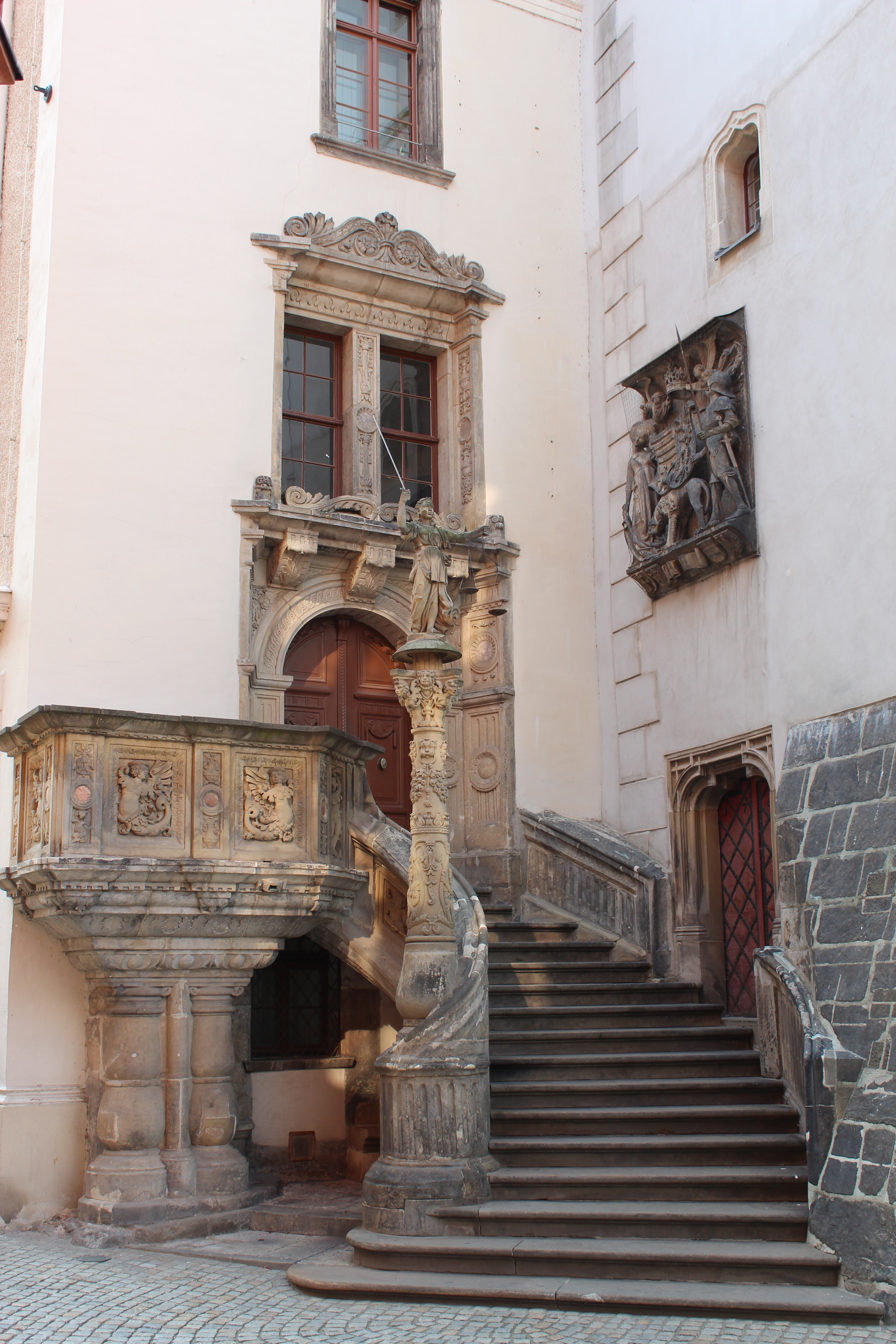
Town Hall Staircase with emblem of Matthias Corvinus mounted in 1488

The Town Hall Staircase erected in 1537 by Wendel Roskopf is a masterpiece of the early Renaissance in Germany. The curved staircase leads up to the portal of the courthouse wing and the pulpit, which was built at the same time. The latter rests on the side of the staircase on a pair of columns with a constricted shaft. The sculptor Andreas Walther I decorated the staircase with patterns unusual for that time. One of them shows Adam and Eve in the fall. Putti using the banister as a slide are found next to Siren that fill the decorative fields of the pulpit. The original reliefs were replaced by copies in 1950. They are now located inside the building, sheltered from erosion.

The sophisticated portal was made by Wendel Roskopf as well.

In 1591 a stone Lady Justice was added. In contrast to the usual representation with the sword, scales and blindfold, this sculpture lacks the latter. This is no critique of the Görlitz jurisdiction, but can be interpreted that her view and judgment is not clouded. The current Lady Justice is a copy from 1952 made by Werner Hempel, because the original sculpture was brought to safety across the Lusatian Neisse but never returned after World War II.

For newly married couples, the staircase is a popular place for wedding photos.

=== Coinage in Lower Market Square 7 ===
Görlitz began to produce coins in 1220 as tenant until 1330, when King John of Bohemia allowed the town to produce them on their own. In 1429 Emperor Sigismund allowed the city to produce silver coins on their own: 12 or 14 Görlitz-Heller are the equivalent to 6 or 7 Görlitz-Pfennig which is the equivalent of one bohemian Groschen. Görlitz began coinage in 1449 and bought the building next to the town hall: Lower Market Square 7. In 1468 a total value of 540,000 bohemian Groschen were produced - measured in Görlitz-Pfennig this would have been at least 3,780,000 pieces.

Görlitz never produced Groschen on their own except for some trials mintings. From 1500 onwards, polish coins flooded the region due to the massive export of cloths by tradesmen while the quality of Görlitz-Pfennig decreased. More and more people accepted the polish coins. This led to an exchange loss of the coins. Because towns in Silesia had a shortage of smaller valued coins and offered a better exchange rate, the city's council tried to get rid of their coins in Silesia. From 1510 to 1515 the town produced '100 times 1000 Schock '. With one Schock being equivalent to 60 Groschen, this means a total of 42.000.000 pfennig were produced in five years. This amount led to massive quality deduction so other cities began producing Görlitz-coins, making the original coins worthless. One could find coins of that time abandoned and hidden still until 1880 inside some historic buildings. Wrocław (150 km from Görlitz) used the economic weakness and obtained the staple right to increase its economic power.

=== New Town Hall ===
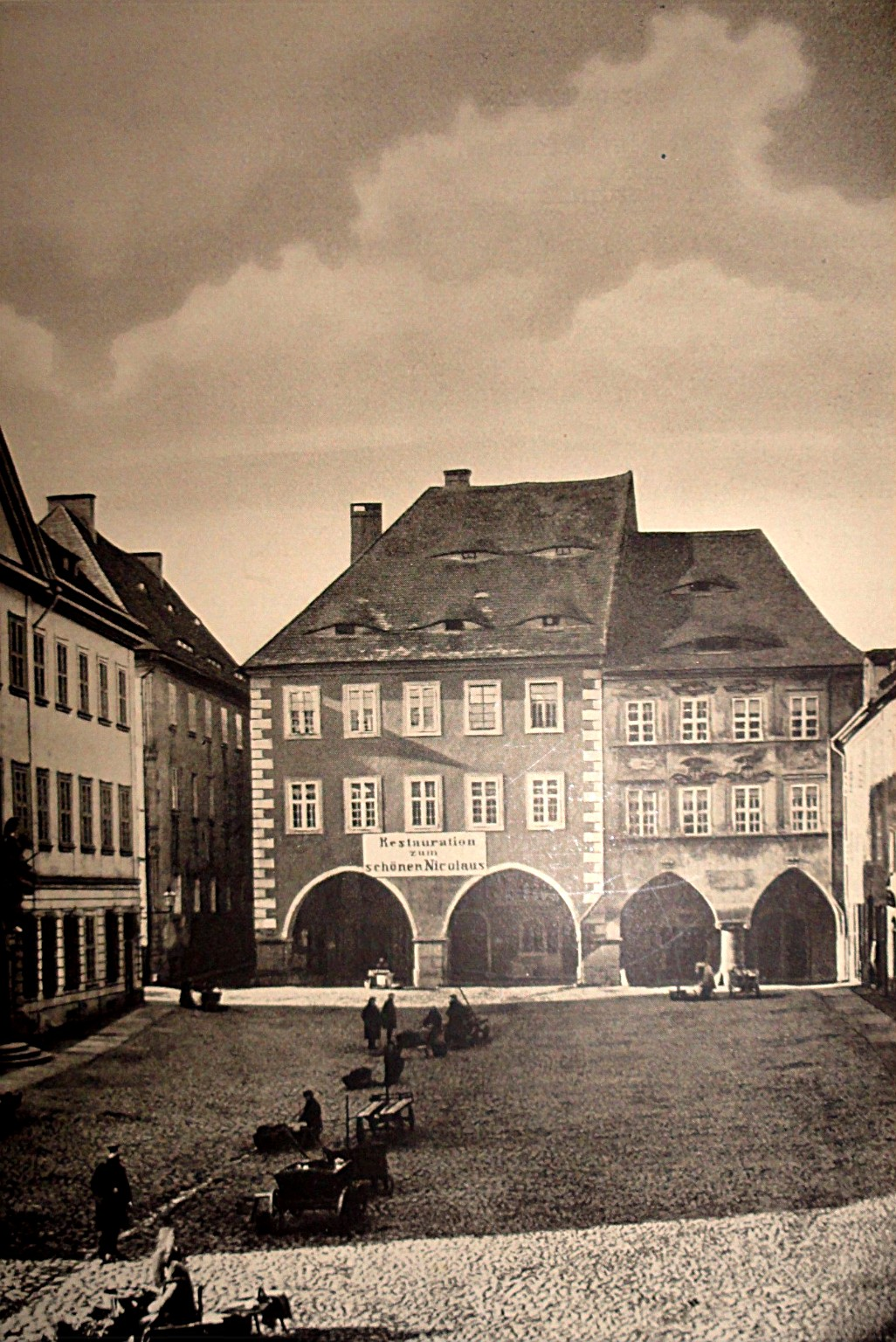
Picture of the old residential buildings

The newest part of the building complex was built in 1903. The architect Jürgen Kröger chose the Neo-Renaissance style.

The building is a reminiscence of the 17th century Görlitz residential houses. The structure looks imposing and it displayed the spirit of the emerging city. Richly designed pilasters dominate the front facade. In contrast to the market front, side and the rear facade were simply covered with white tiles. Facing the Lower Market Square there are the six emblems of the six towns of the Lusatian League. The town hall enthrones on several baroque portals, which come from the two residential houses that had to give way to the construction.

Emblems of the Lusatian League on the New Town Hall

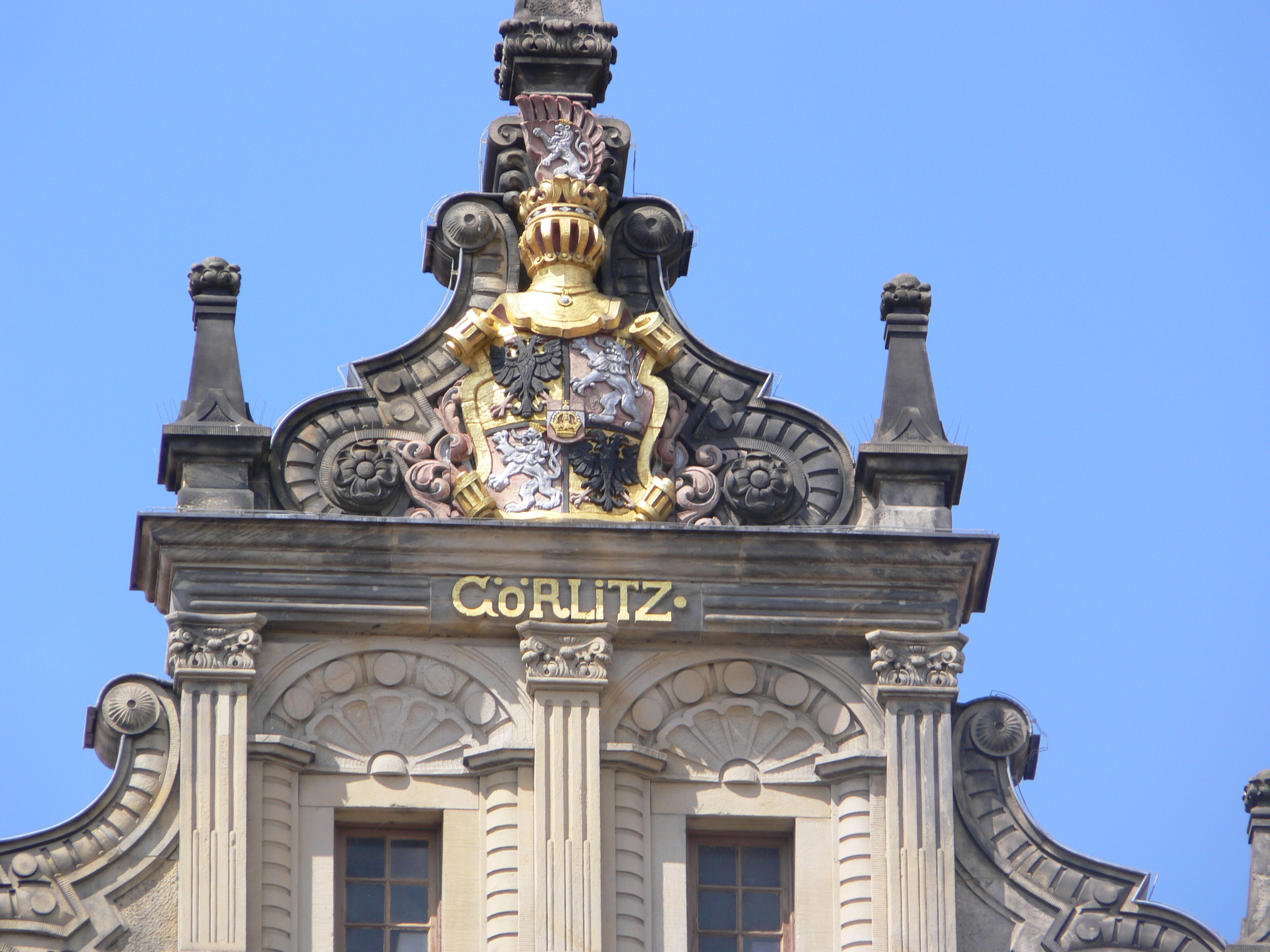
Emblems of Görlitz

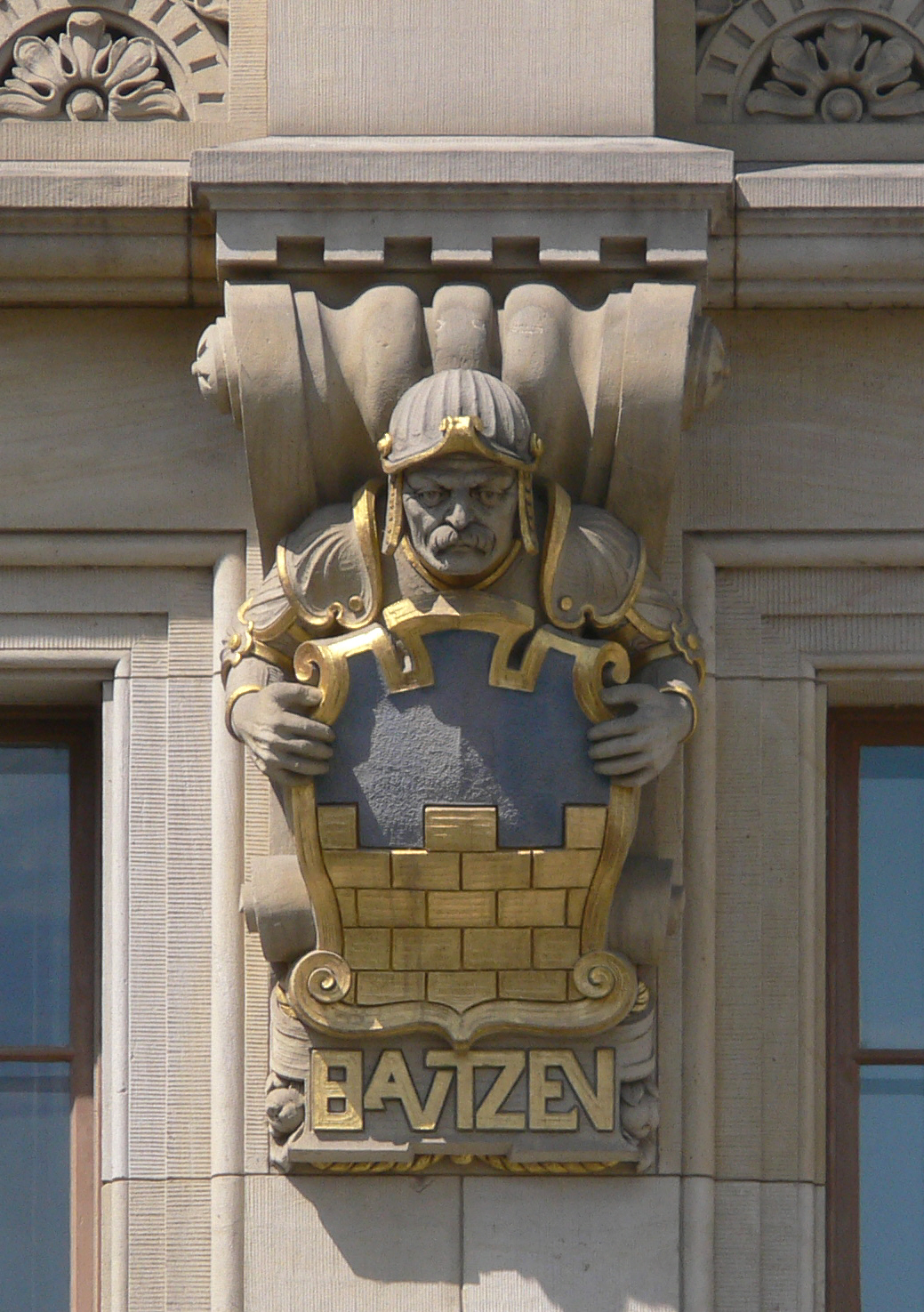
Emblems of Bautzen

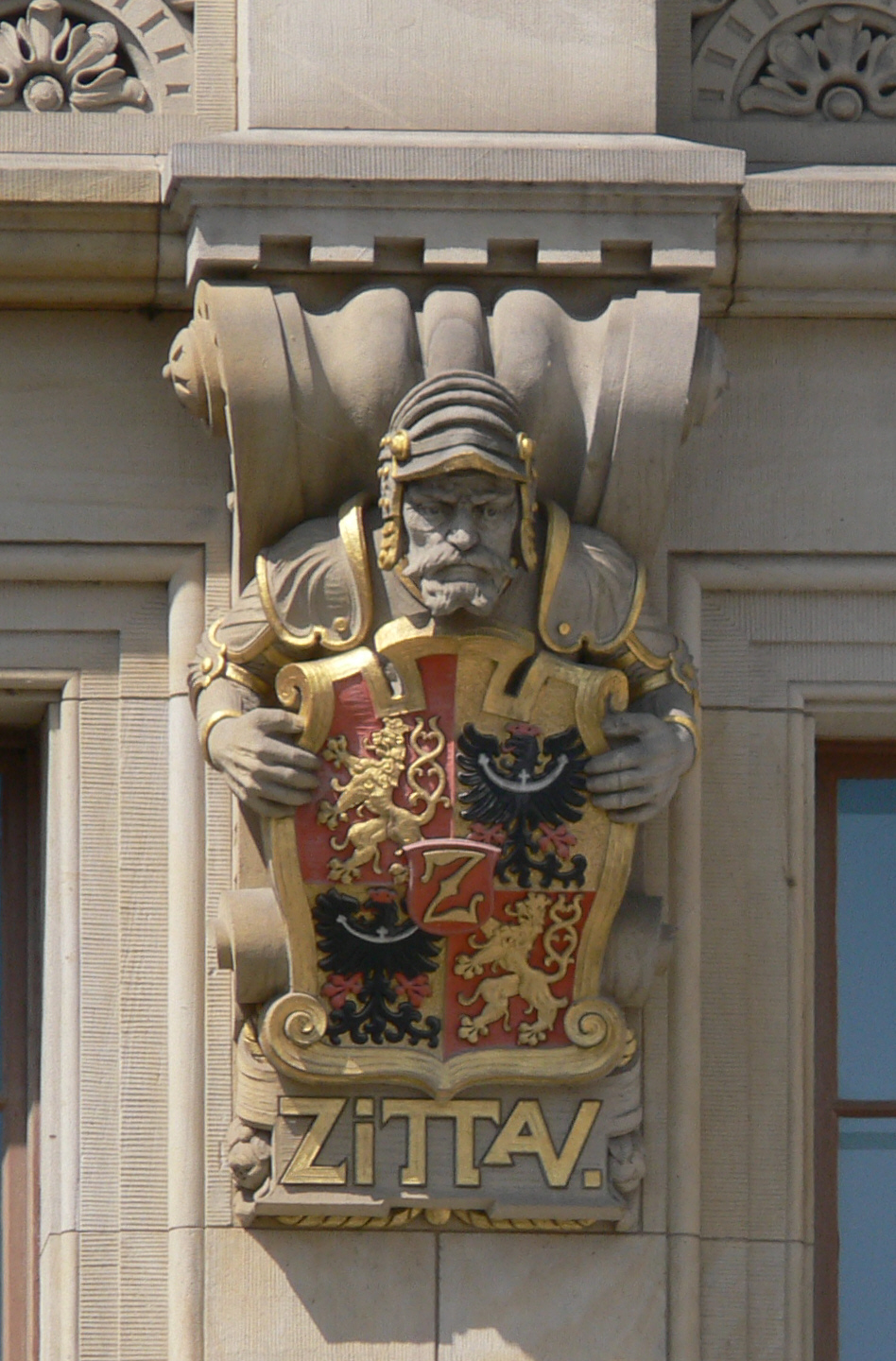
Emblems of Zittau

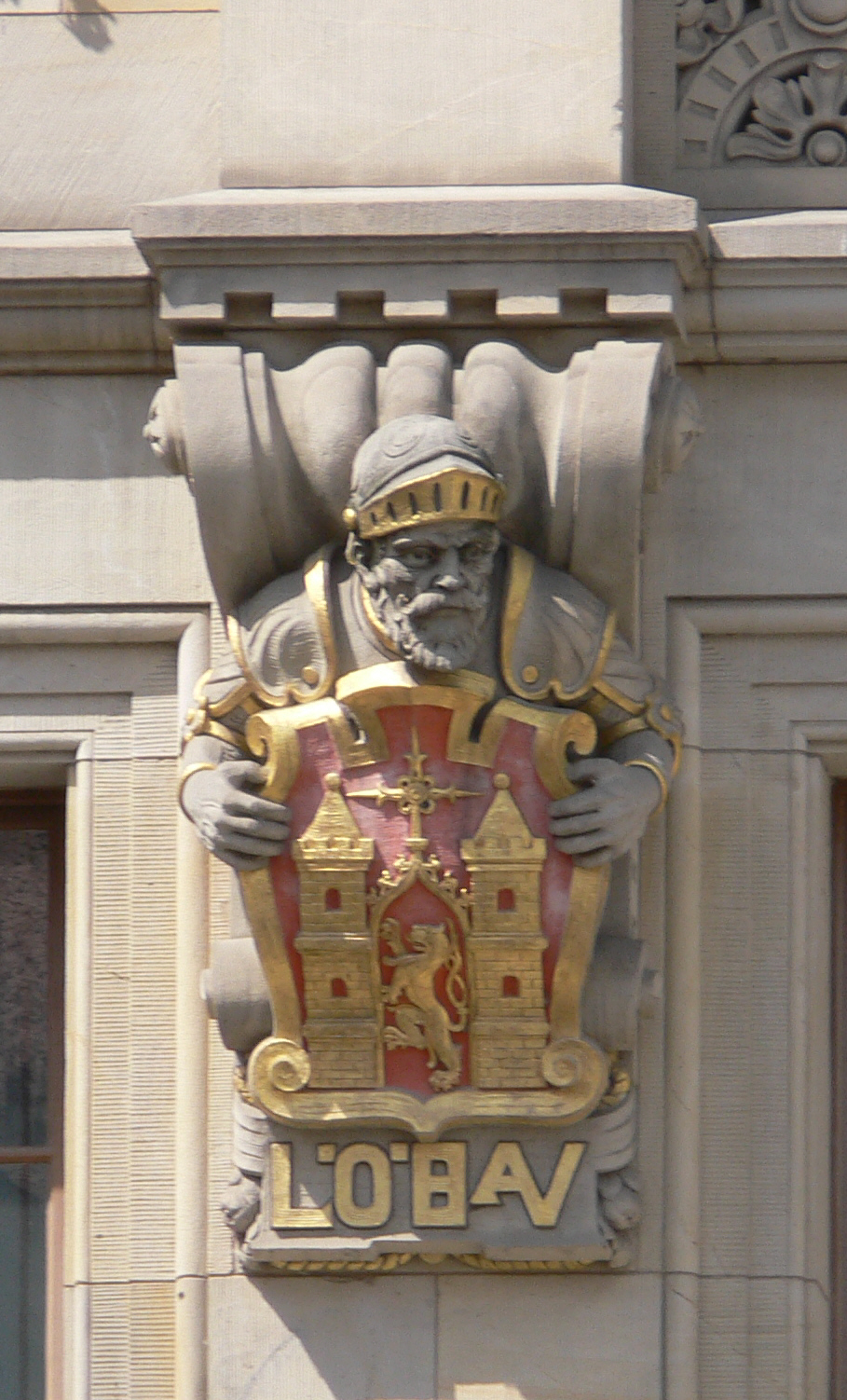
Emblems of Löbau

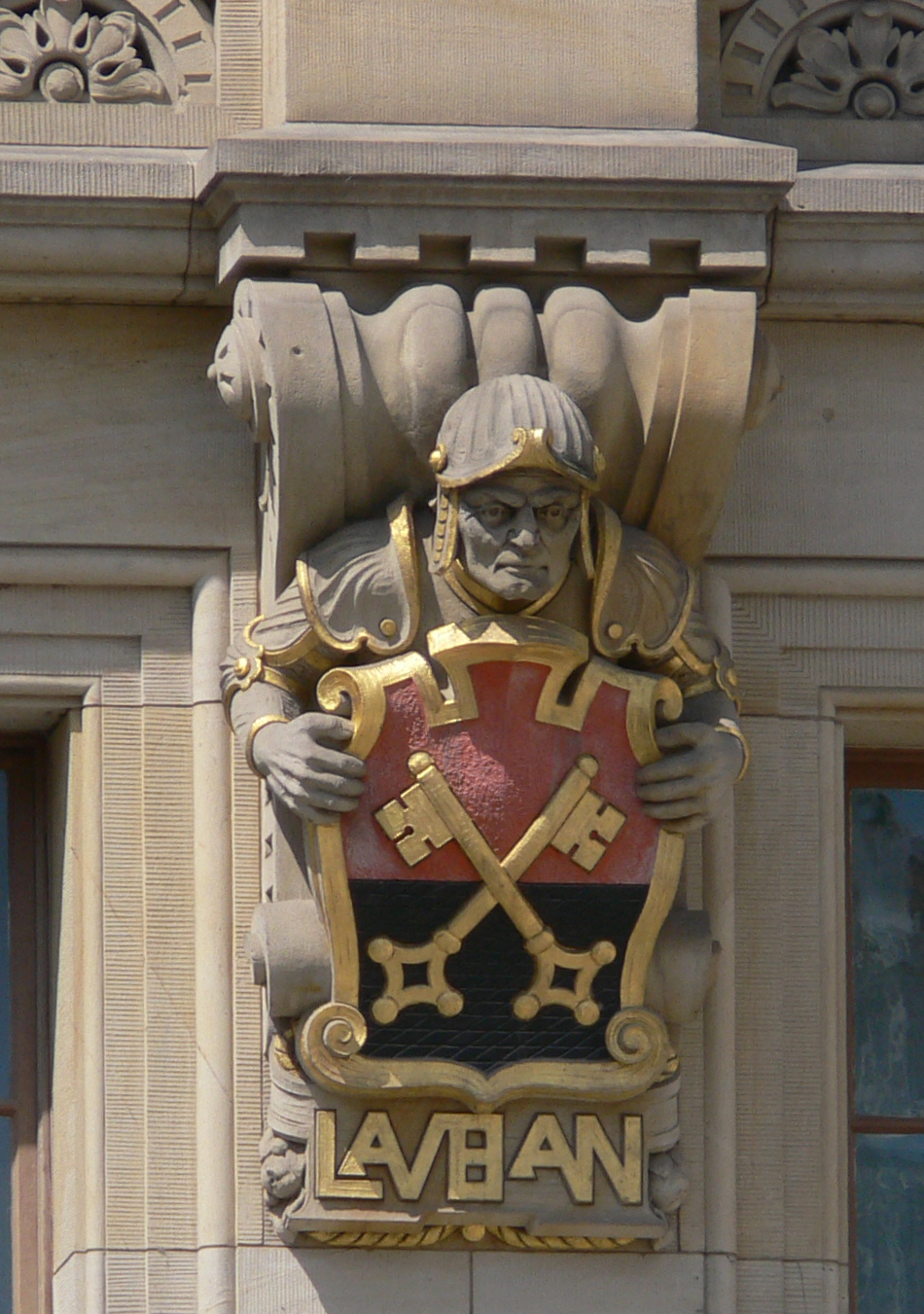
Emblems of Lubań

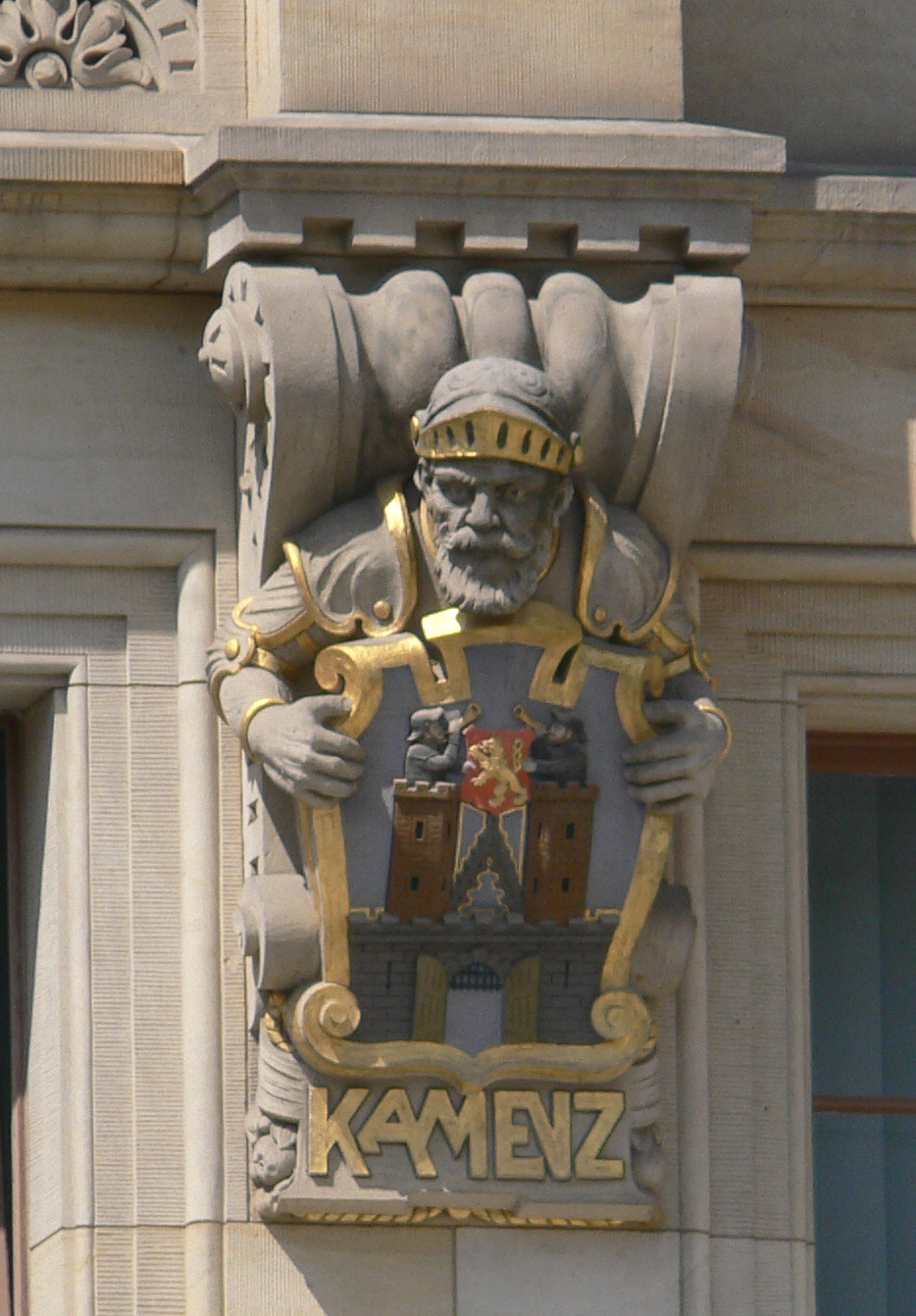
Emblems of Kamenz

== Literature ==
- Dietmar Ridder, Siegfried Hoche: Das Rathaus der Stadt Görlitz. Ein Baugeschichtlicher Rundgang, Görlitz 2004.
