= Upper Lusatian Library of Sciences =

- Oberlausitzische Bibliothek der Wissenschaften
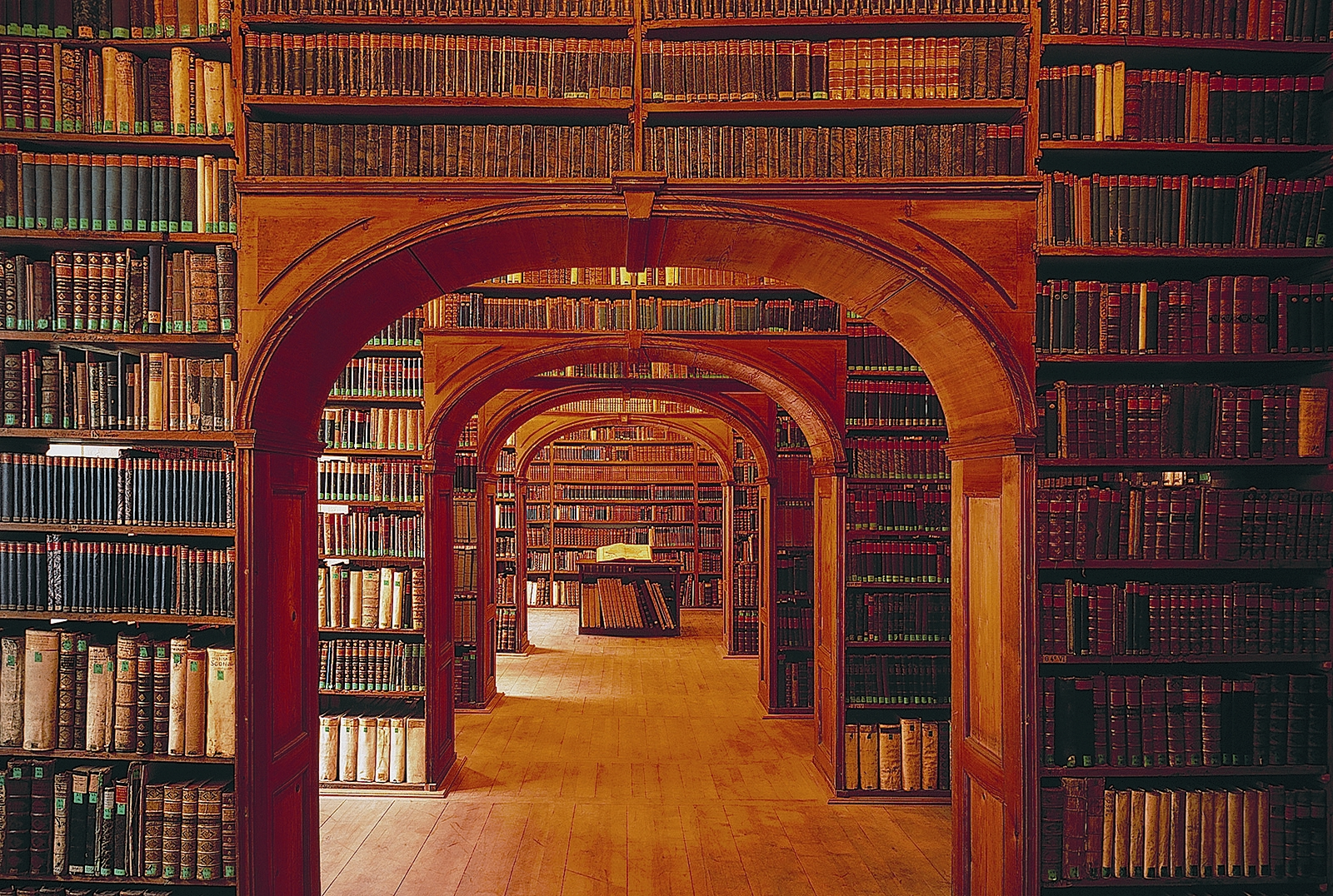
- Historic Library Hall
- 51.15585°N 14.9922°E
- Location: Handwerk 2, 02826 Görlitz, Germany
- Type: Scientific Library
- Established: 1727,1779,1950

Collection
- Size: 150,000 items

Other information
- Director: Steffen Menzel
- Parent organization: City of Görlitz

The Upper Lusatian Library of Sciences (Upper Sorbian: Hornjołužiska bibloteka wědomosćow) contains about 150,000 volumes, making it the largest library in Görlitz and the most important regional library between Dresden and Wrocław. Cornered between Germany, Poland and Czech Republic and therefore looking back on a rich history, its goal is to provide historical research and enhance knowledge transfer in the region.

== History ==
In 1779, Görlitz had roughly 7,500 inhabitants and was the center of the economical and political independent Upper Lusatia at the corner of the Electorate of Saxony. On 21 April 1779, 20 members of educated and sophisticated classes and nobility came together to found a society called Upper Lusatian Society for the Promotion of Historical and Natural History. Later in 1792 the society was renamed to Upper Lusatian Society of Sciences.

The Upper Lusatian Library of Sciences was founded 1950 by merging the collected volumes of the Upper Lusatian Society of Sciences and the Library of Milich, that came to Görlitz in 1727.

=== Library of Sciences ===
Upper Lusatian Society of Sciences was founded 1779 in Görlitz by the initiative of the lawyer, historian and linguist Karl Gottlob Anton (1751–1818) and the landlord and natural scientist Adolf Traugott von Gersdorff (1744–1807). Both and their members were powered by the ideas of enlightenment which centered the faculty of reason and did research on many scientific disciplines. Thus, the collected volumes were broad, including natural science, grammar and linguistic, encyclopedia and historic literature. Later in the 19th century Upper Lusatian Society shifted the subject of research torwards the regional history of the Upper Lusatia.

==== Adolf Traugott von Gersdorff (1744–1807) ====
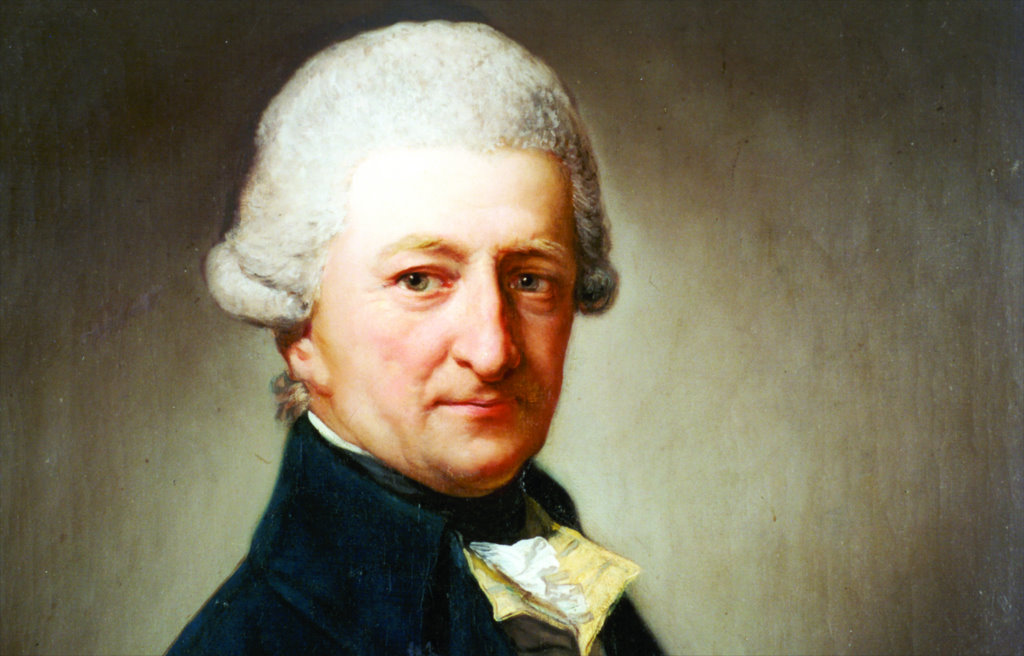
Adolf Traugott von Gersdorff

As one of the two founders, Gersdorrf donated his collected scientific volumes and a library with about 10,000 books to the Upper Lusatian Society of Sciences. The literature covers physical, meteorological, mineralogical topics. He left a large collection of literature about lightning protection of the 18th century. His travel journals, geographic works and maps show a remarkable intellectual life in the Upper Lusatia and a vivid exchange with thinkers in Europe.

==== Karl Gottlob Anton (1751–1818) ====
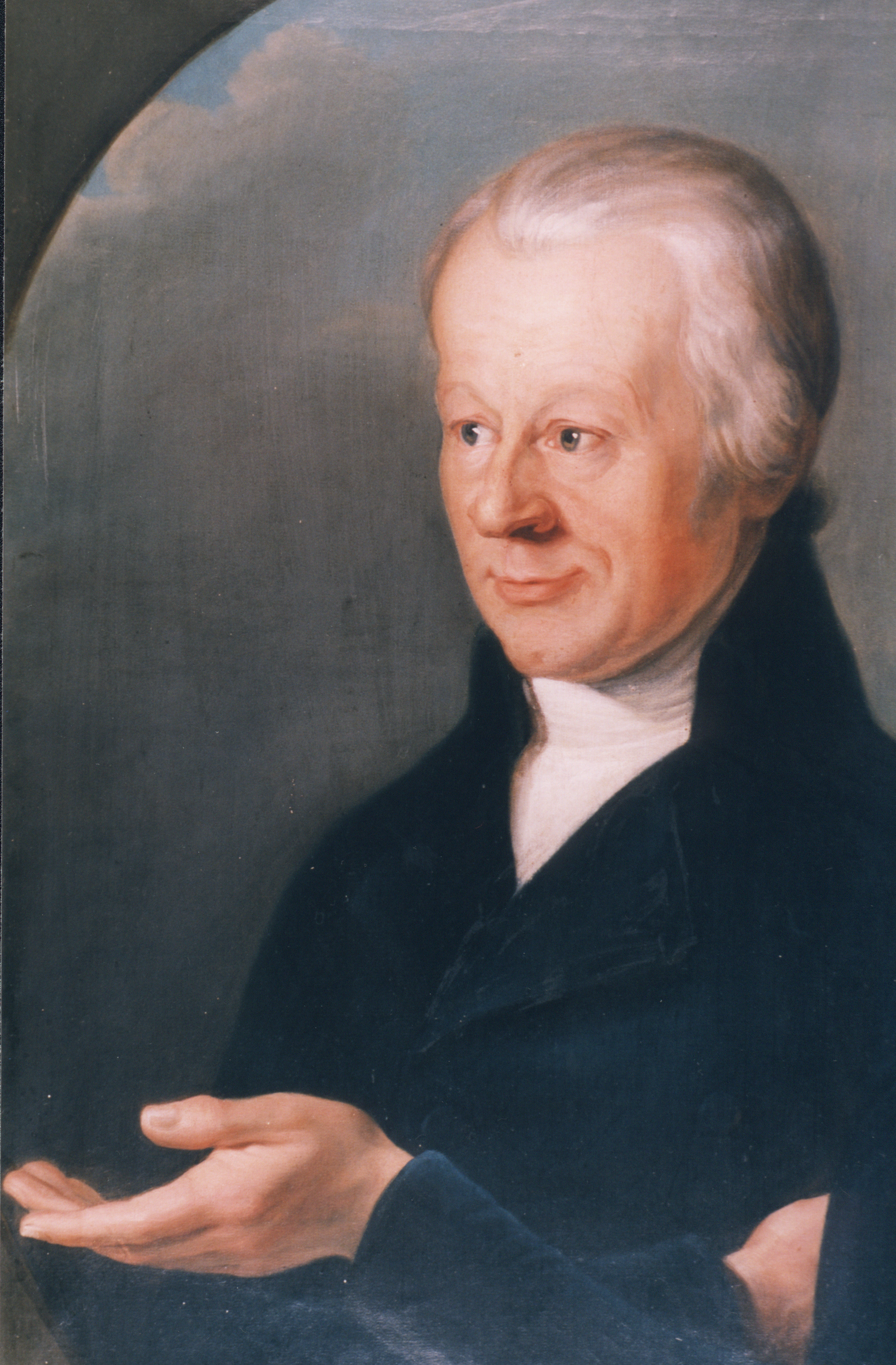
Karl Gottlob Anton

The resident of Görlitz and lawyer Karl Gottlob Anton, ennobled in 1802, wanted to found a 'busy academic society' in 1779. His scientific interest lay in history, law, linguistics and Slavic studies. His research about Sorbian languages, Slavs and the early agricultural history gained lasting recognition. In 1801 he donated his scientific works and roughly 10,000 books to his Upper Lusatian Society. As founder and secretary of the Society he bought the house in Handwerk street on the Lower Market Square to meet the demand of the growing library.

=== Library of Milich ===
The Library of Milich was a private collection by the Świdnician lawyer Johann Gottlieb Milich (1678-1726). It contained legally and religious items, 7,000 books, 200 handwritten scripts, 500 coins and a handful of curiosities. In 1727 the library was handed to the Augustum-Annen-Gymnasium in Görlitz by his will under the condition to keep the library open to the public two days a week for the next 200 years. Over time the library has been merged with donations from inhabitants of Görlitz and the collection of the local monastery library.

== A neo-classicistic scenic library ==
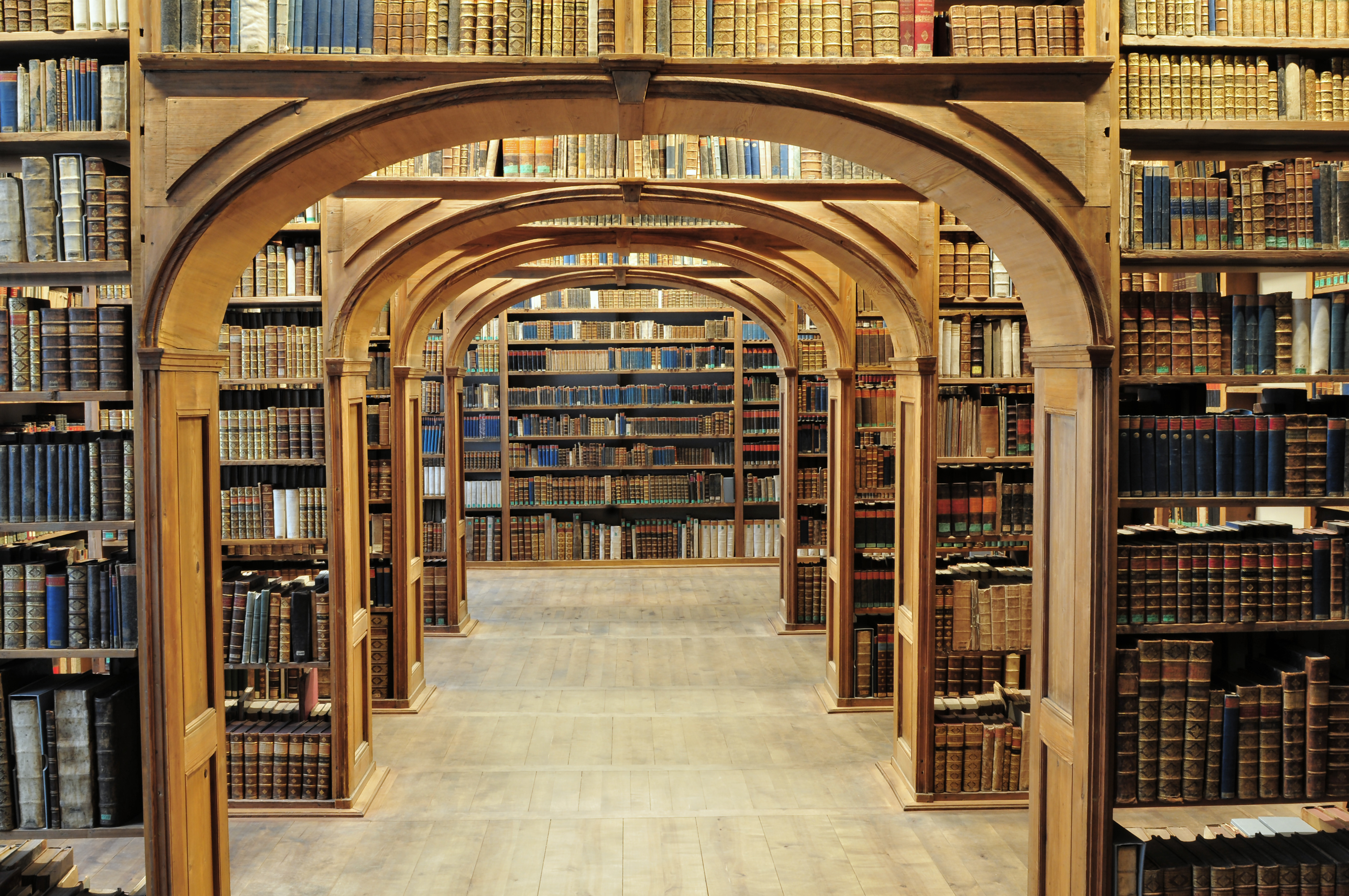
The historic classicistic library hall after refurbishment in 2010

The library hall was occupied in 1806, when Karl Gottlob Anton donated his own library to the Society. Possibly the first four arches belonged to this donation; in 1841 another arch was added. The large library hall was modeled on the library of the Francke Foundations in Halle (Saale) and noble private libraries in central Germany and Silesia. The basic idea follows baroque theatre architecture - with triumphal arches of knowledge that divide the hall in different sceneries.

As a research library, it lacks ornamentation. Only the backs of the book decorate the room. The older stuccoed ceilings were knocked off so that nothing distracted from the power of the word. During the restoration in 1951, the original stucco was painterly suggested again.

Due to its simplicity the historic library hall is a prominent example of the early Neoclassicism.

== Library stock ==
The Upper Lusatian Library of Sciences contains about 150,000 items and roughly 40% of them have been published before 1900. The library includes several rarities and valuables like Francysk Skaryna Bible (1517-1519), Incunables from the 15th century, a collection of flyers from the Reformation period, manuscripts and 3,000 historic maps and atlases including sheets of Gerhard Mercator (1571) and Abraham Ortelius (1621). A handwritten codex from the 11th century with texts by the Roman historian Sallust is the oldest item in the library.

The items with the most important scientific value are grouped in the complex Archive. It contains the collected items of Karl Gottlob Anton, Adolf Traugott von Gersdorff and assets of other scholars and poets of Upper Lusatia. The collection ranges from manuscripts of the great Upper Lusatian enlightener Ehrenfried Walther von Tschirnhaus (1651-1708) to records of the Bad Muskau poet and Pückler-confidant Leopold Schefer (1784-1862) to the estate of the Görlitz writer and publicist Ludwig Kunz (1890-1976).

With the mill archive from the estate of the mill researcher Günter Rapp, the library houses an extensive collection of texts and about 16,000 photographs of mills in Upper Lusatia and the former GDR.

== Jakob Böhme ==
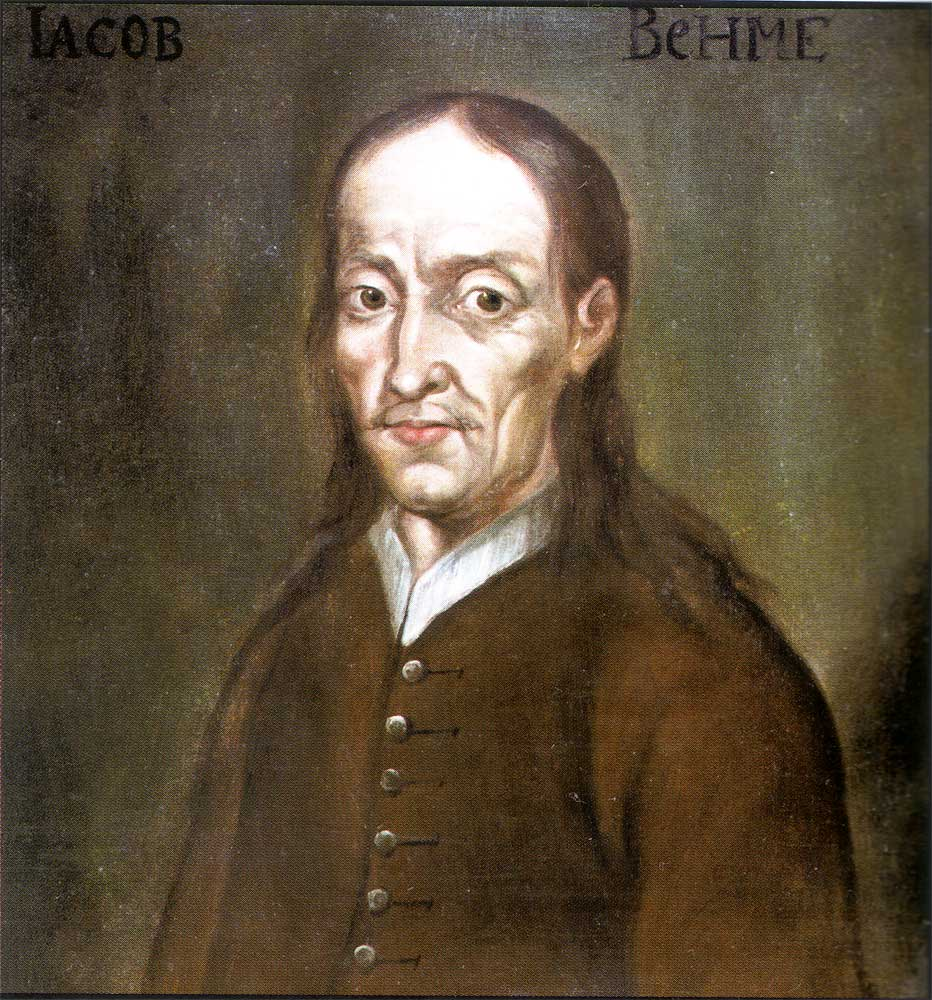
Jakob Böhme

A high priority is given to the collection on the German philosopher, Christian mystic, and theologian Jakob Böhme. He is undoubtedly the most famous person of Görlitz with the most profound influence on later philosophical movements in Europe. Today, an important task of the library is the systematic collection of literature of and about Jakob Böhme. The library provides information on Boehme's life and impact for further research from philosophical, theological and philological aspects. With about 1,500 works and essays, the Upper Lusatian Library owns a large collection of the theosophist from Görlitz.

== Gallery ==
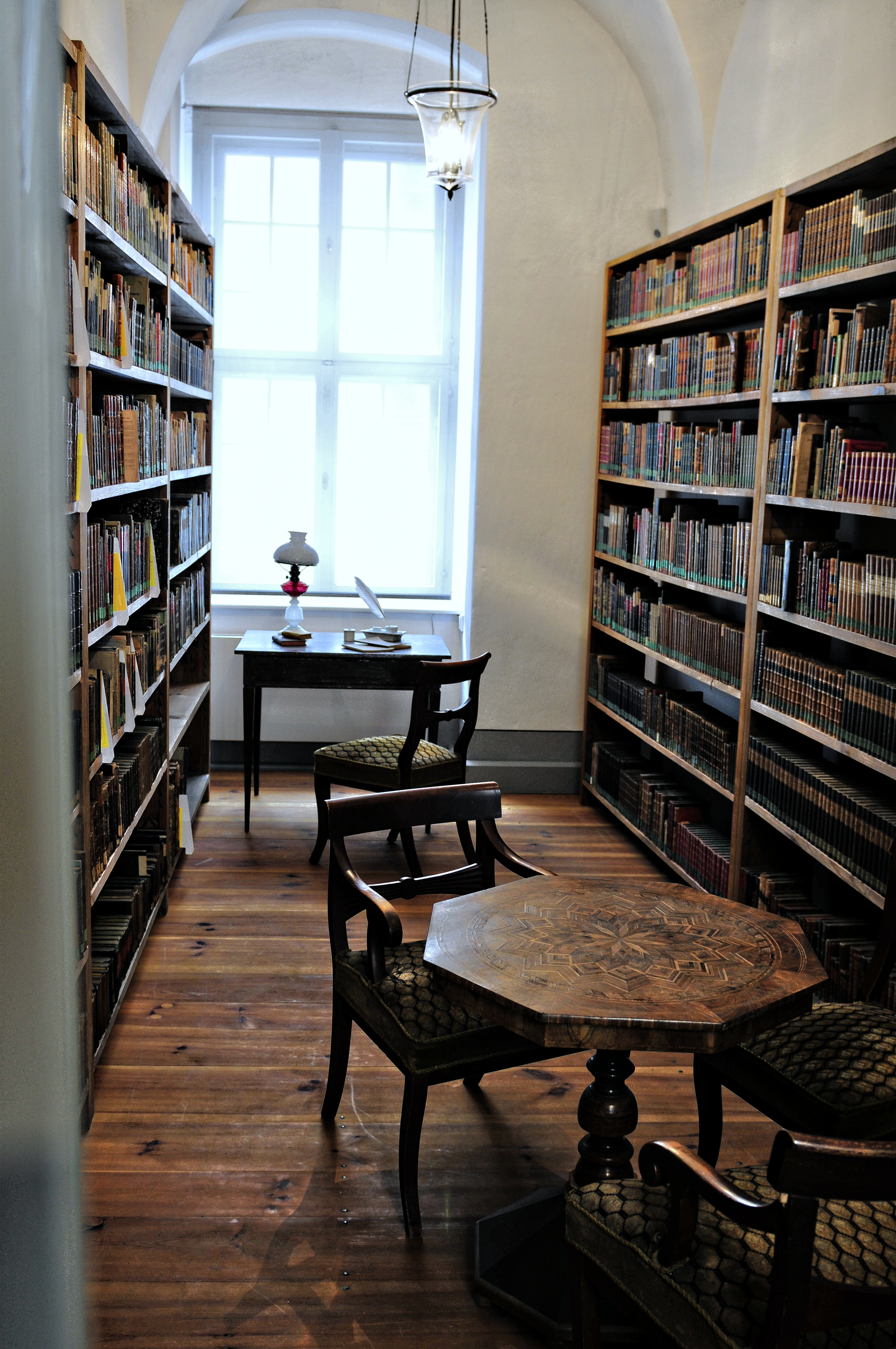
Librarian room

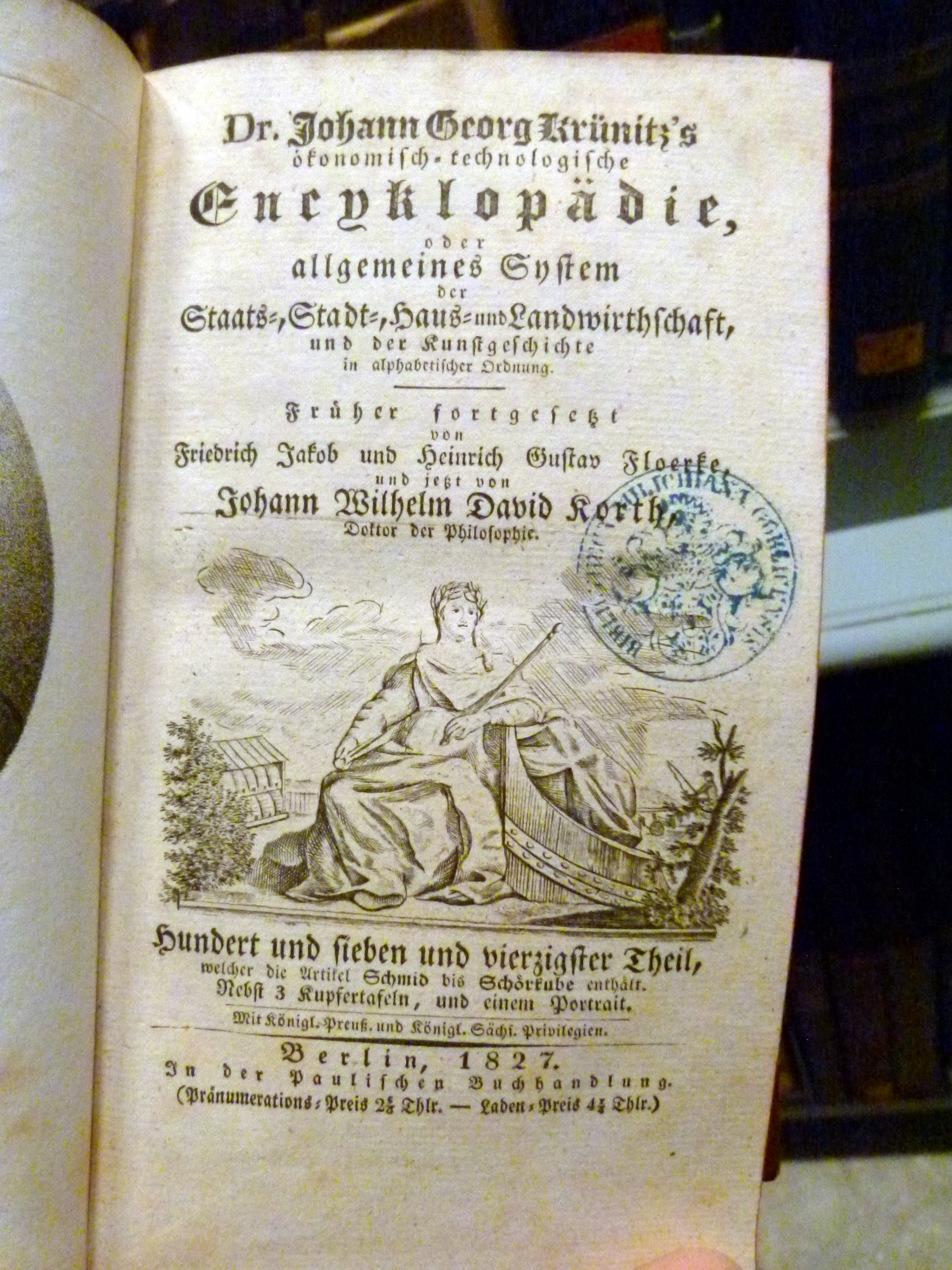
Frontpage of Oeconomischen Encyclopädie by Johann Georg Krünitz

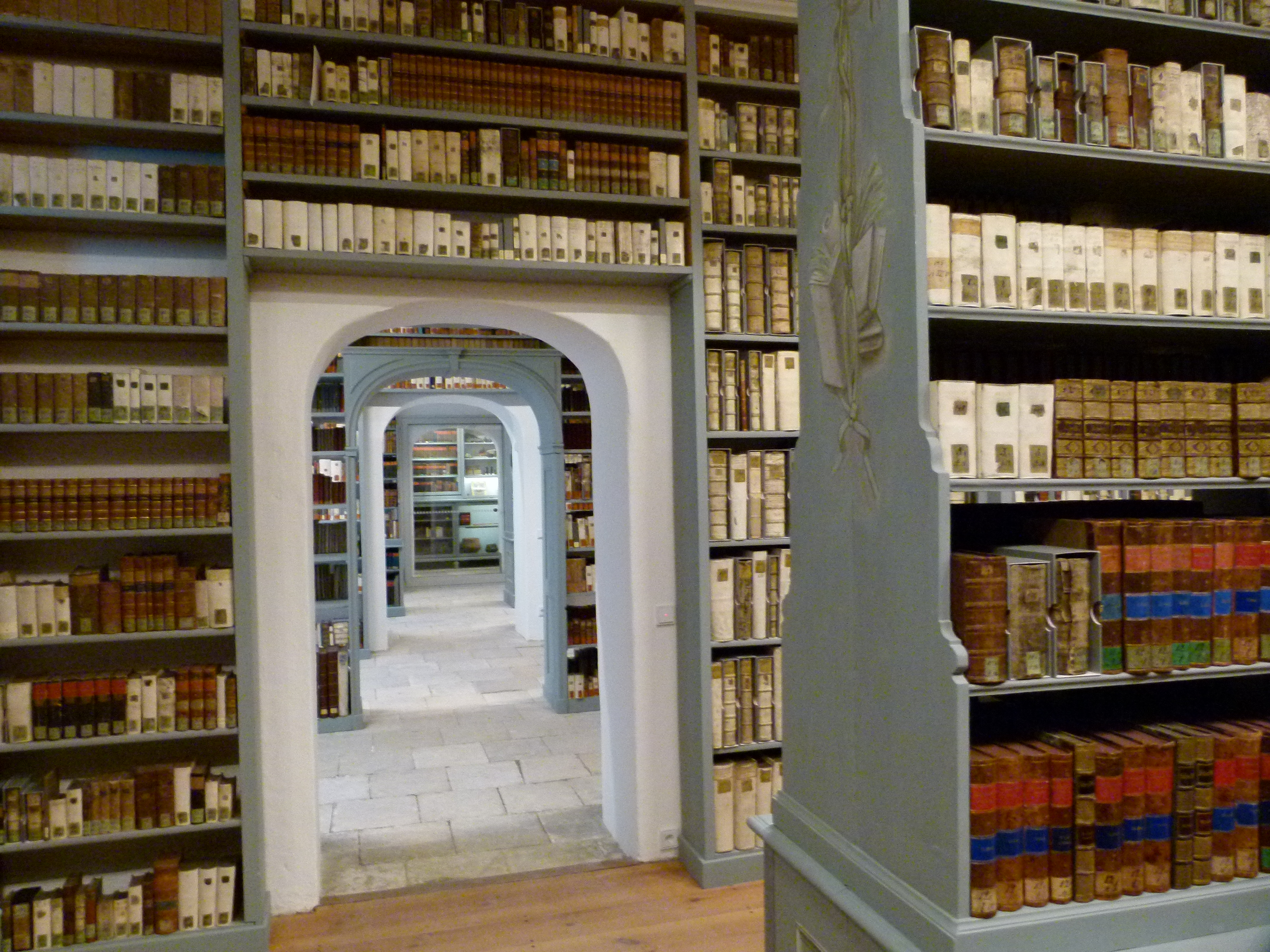
Library of Milich

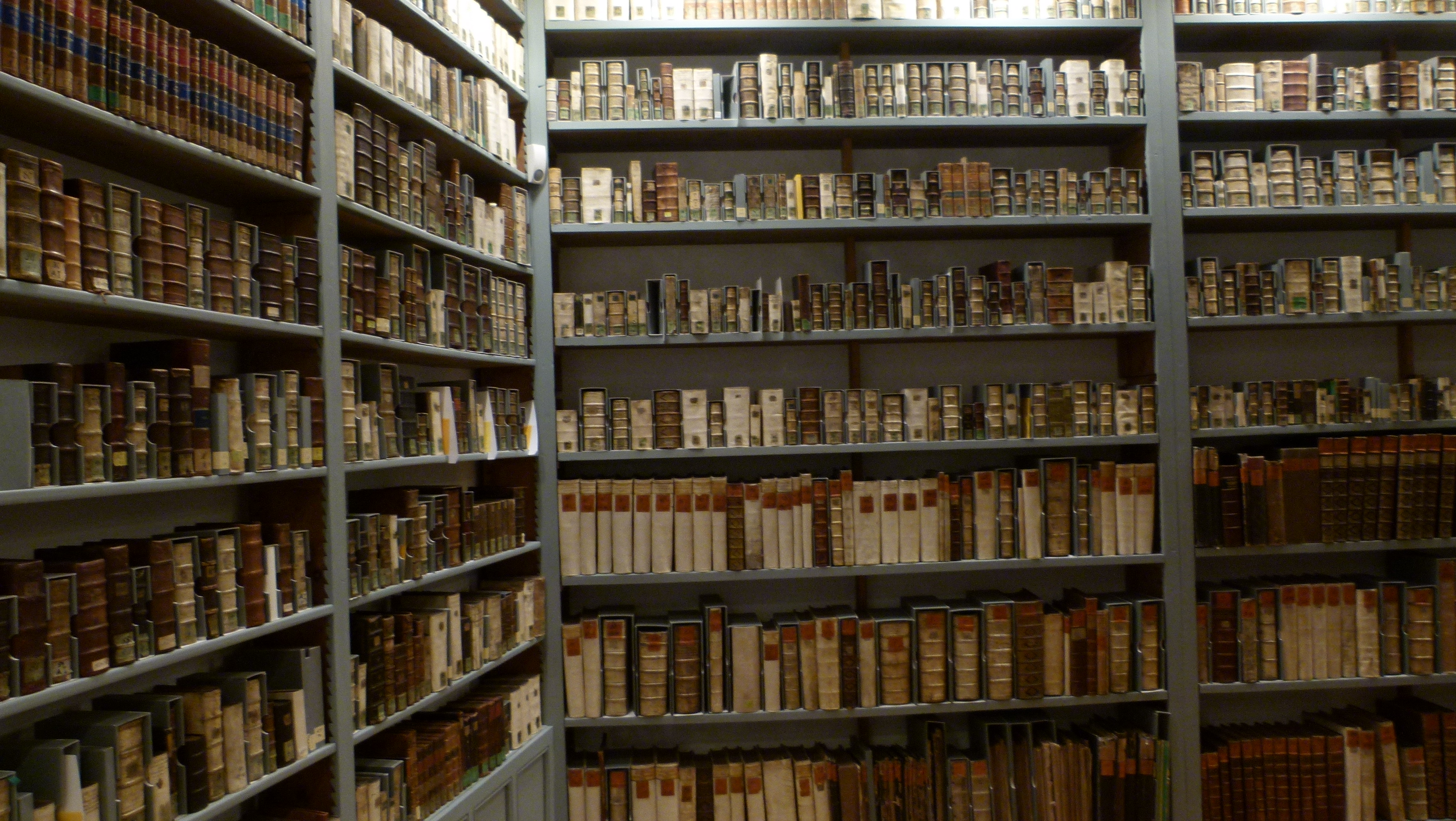
A collection of old books

== Literature ==
- Francysk Skaryna (1517–1519), Библия Руска (in Rusyn), Prague: Francysk Skaryna
- Christian Knauthe (1737), Historische Nachrichten von denen Bibliotheken in Görlitz (in German), Görlitz: Publisher unknown
- Robert Joachim (1876), Geschichte der Milich'schen Bibliothek und ihre Sammlungen (in German), Görlitz: Jungandreas
- Richard Jecht (1929), 150 Jahre Oberlausitzische Gesellschaft der Wissenschaften: 1779–1929 (in German), Görlitz: Im Selbstverlag der Gesellschaft
- Ernst-Heinz Lemper (1974), Adolph Traugott von Gersdorf (1744–1807): Naturforschung und soziale Reformen im Dienste der Humanität (in German), Berlin: VEB Deutscher Verlag der Wissenschaften
- Annerose Klammt (1977), "Oberlausitzische Bibliothek der Wissenschaften bei den Städtischen Kunstsammlungen", Handbuch der historischen Buchbestände in Deutschland (in German), Hildesheim: Olms-Weidmann, pp. 284–289
- Ernst-Heinz Lemper (1994), "Zur Geschichte und Bedeutung der Oberlausitzischen Gesellschaft der Wissenschaften zu Görlitz", Neues Archiv für Sächsische Geschichte (in German), vol. 64, pp. 85–95
- Martin Kügler, Cornelia Eisler (2000), Johann Gottlieb Milich: Gelehrter und Sammler (in German), Görlitz/Zittau: Oettel, ISBN 3-932693-55-8
