= Wendel Roskopf =

Wendel Roskopf the Elder (* 5 February 1485 – 1490; † 25 June 1549 in Görlitz) was a stonemason, master builder and member of the cities council 1523 to 1548. In 1526 onwards he was the towns council chief builder.

== Work ==
After Görlitz burned down in 1525, Roskopf built the Schönhof, the town's first Renaissance building - it was restored in 2006 to house the town's Silesian Museum. From 1537 to 1539 he also headed the construction of the town hall staircase. He also designed the Archivflügel (archives wing) of the town hall. He owned the house whose address is now Bierhof Rosengasse 4. 1515 - 1516 He is the author of the first portrait of Jan Zizka from Trocnov. He worked on the order of the local town council in Tábor. A city in the south of Bohemia.

== Bibliography ==
- Inga Arnold: Wendel Roskopf der Ältere und die Renaissance in Görlitz, Denkmalpflege in Görlitz, Nr. 8, 1999, S. 4 - 9
