= Royal Avenue, Chelsea =

Garden square in Chelsea, London

Coordinates: 51°29′22″N 0°09′42″W

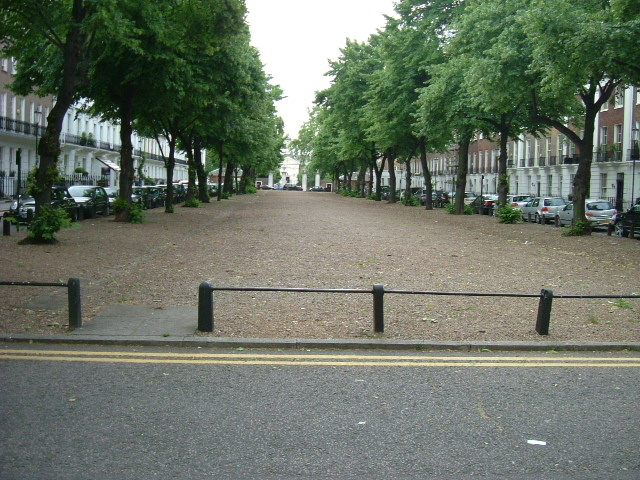
Royal Avenue, 2008

Royal Avenue is a garden square in Chelsea, London, England.

The street runs between the King's Road and St Leonard's Terrace.

== History ==
Royal Avenue was laid out in the 1690s by William III with the intention that it form part of a proposed carriage way between the Hospital with Kensington Palace. As the middle of the square was enclosed by a hedge and a small white fence, by 1748 it was known as White Stile Walk.

== Notable residents ==
Royal Avenue is the fictional home of James Bond in the Ian Fleming novels.

No.2 was the birthplace of David Carritt (1927–1982), art historian, dealer and critic.

No.4 was home to Petula Clark from the 1980s to 1998.

No.18 has been home to the artist Bernard Stern (1920-2002), and the architect Richard Rogers.

No.29 has been home to Joseph Losey, the American film director, and his 1963 film The Servant starring Dirk Bogarde, Sarah Miles, James Fox and Wendy Craig was shot in an empty house opposite.

No.36 was rented by Dante Gabriel Rossetti for his mistress Fanny Cornforth.

No.39 was the home of novelist and scriptwriter Elinor Glyn (1864–1943), who died there.
