= Schönhof (Görlitz) =

Renaissance building in Görlitz

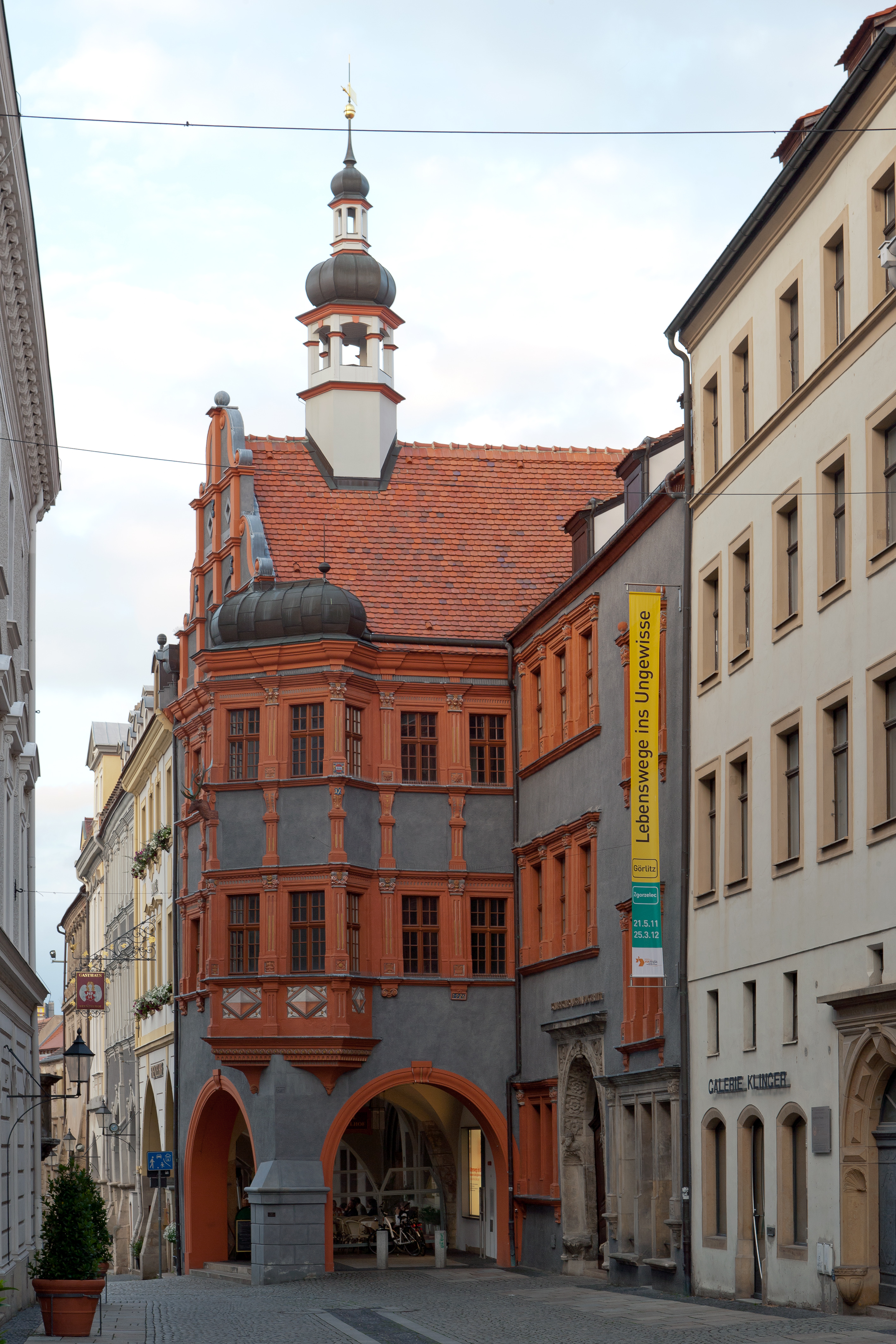
- Schönhof viewed from Bretheren Street
- Interactive map of the Schönhof area

General information
- Architectural style: Renaissance
- Location: Brüderstraße 8 (Bretheren Street), 02826 Görlitz
- Coordinates: 51.156017°N 14.990654°E
- Groundbreaking: 14th century
- Construction started: 1526

Design and construction
- Architect: Wendel Roskopf

Website
- Silesian Museum

The Schönhof (pronounced [ʃøːnhoːf], literally 'beautiful court') is the oldest Renaissance-building in Görlitz, Germany. The building on Bretheren Street 8 (Brüderstraße) was constructed by Wendel Roskopf in 1526 over the surviving stone foundations after the town fire in 1525.

Favored by its topographical location, the comfortably furnished representative building served as a royal guesthouse since the 14th century. Its historical and architectural value was recognized early on and saved the house from far-reaching conversion measures and even demolitions.

A central hall inside the building extends over all floors, thus the house corresponds to the type of a Görlitz hall house. This hall was obstructed in the course of the centuries - however, its walls are accessible to the research

== Location ==
The Schönhof is located between the Lower Market Square and the Bretheren Street. The Bretheren Street connects the Lower Market Square with the Upper Market Square. Through all three passed the medieval trade route Via Regia, which connected Wrocław, Görlitz and Leipzig from Kyiv and led to Santiago de Compostela. All incoming goods were taxed at the city's scales and had to be stored and offered to the public in merchants' houses – the so-called Staple Right. The Schönhof is located next to those merchant houses, directly opposite the court wing of the town hall. Besides the location next to the parish church of St. Peter and Paul and Woad House, this is the most prominent location in the medieval town.

== History ==
The history of this building dates back to the 13th century. Since that time, and due to its special location, the building accommodated sovereigns who acted as the supreme judicial authority at the nearby court. Throughout the centuries the building was changed multiple times to meet the contemporary demands of the nobility; it was connected to two other buildings and was severely damaged by the town fire in 1525. As a result, there are extremely complex architectural findings that make it difficult to reconstruct the conversions accurately.

=== 13th to 16th century ===
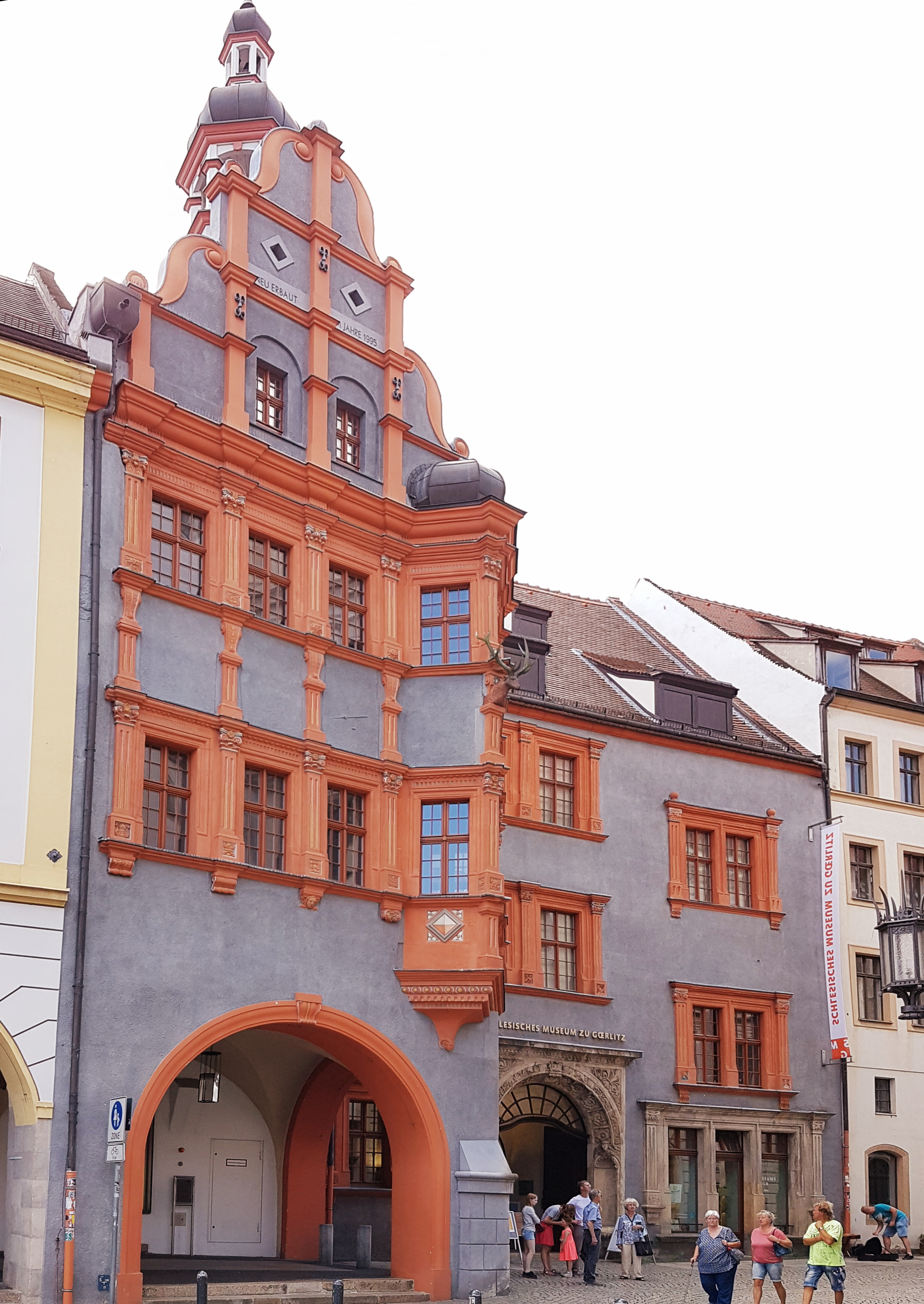
Schönhof viewed from Lower Market Square

In the 13th century, Bohemian servants and wealthy families lived closely together in multiple courtyards. Recorded courtyards of that time are the Woad House, the town hall building on Lower Market Square 6, the corner Neißstraße-Hainwald and the predecessor building of the Holy Trinity Church on Upper Market Square. The courtyards were spread over the whole medieval town and were often located next to craftsman houses.

The predecessor building of the Schönhof was at that time a timber-framed house, whose ground plan was reconstructed by beam impressions in the floor of the cellar. It was probably constructed in the first half of the 13th century. A second building phase could be dated to the middle of the century. At that time the building was used as a courtyard as well. Only a stone cell of that building is preserved. The adjacent smaller stone building provided a passage to the fish market on the other side. Later it was walled up and a storey was placed above it.

The city quickly reached a solid economic base and wealthy families married merchants and formed the Görlitz nobility. Towards the end of the 13th century, the town gained more and more local self-government so that the Bohemian state administration became redundant. In 1303, Görlitz received town privileges and began planning an administration building, but decided to buy the courtyard on Lower Market Square 6 – today's town hall.

The Schönhof was thus located directly opposite the town hall and on the long-distance trade route Via Regia. Two further construction phases followed until 1400, during which it was fundamentally rebuilt again in 1400. Among other things, a hall was built on the eastern side of the courtyard, which was decorated with draperies, wood paneling and wall paintings. Two 3.5m tall pointed arch windows brought light into the room. They were decreased to 1.75m and 2.3m height before the town fire in 1525.

In 1405 Wenceslaus IV stayed in the Schönhof. For this occasion a wooden walkway was built towards the town hall. The King Albert the Magnanimous, his son Ladislaus the Posthumous and George of Poděbrady used the Schönhof as royal guesthouse.

The owners of the building can be traced back continuously to 1400. Therefore, the first known owners are Niclas Merten and Caspar Geiske. In 1412 the building went to Consul Francisco Pleczil, followed by Kaspar Lelau (mayor during the Hussite Wars) and Niclas Jeronimi (accused of high treason as a council member and expelled from the city in 1479). All owners belonged to the Görlitz establishment.

In 1427 the building was a brewery and was allowed to brew beer six times a year. At this time, the three adjacent parts of the house are no longer listed as separate houses in the register of stories. Therefore, they must have been connected by a reconstruction before 1427. Probably between 1476 and 1479, the current basic structures of the house were created: the central hall was built, the masonry of the facade on the second floor was made of quarry stone and the windows were enclosed by masonry bricks with colored joints. The windows were arranged differently than today and the colored joints disappeared under the plaster from 1525.

=== Construction Measures in the Early Modern Period ===
Despite the difficult economic conditions between 1500 and 1530, the Görlitz upper class still earned money with their buildings and wanted their wealth and influence to be reflected in them. Unlike in Gothic times, the money no longer flowed solely into church buildings. The well-traveled and well-connected merchants were free in the design of their houses and no legitimation to a bishop was necessary (unlike, for example, in Augsburg and Wrocław).

The Schönhof is not the first building that shows non-Gothic elements. The first break from the Gothic style was found in 1500 on the gable of Hans Frenzel's house – the building next to the Schönhof. In the house there are also Trompe-l'œil in an Italian style. In 1515, the merchant Frenzel donated 1500 Görlitz coins for a new portal on the Nikolai Church, which shows an upward-opening pointed arch portal.

However, it is undisputed that the Schönhof and a short time later the Peterstraße 8 were the first buildings to introduce elements of the Renaissance in Görlitz.

==== Reconstruction in 1526 ====
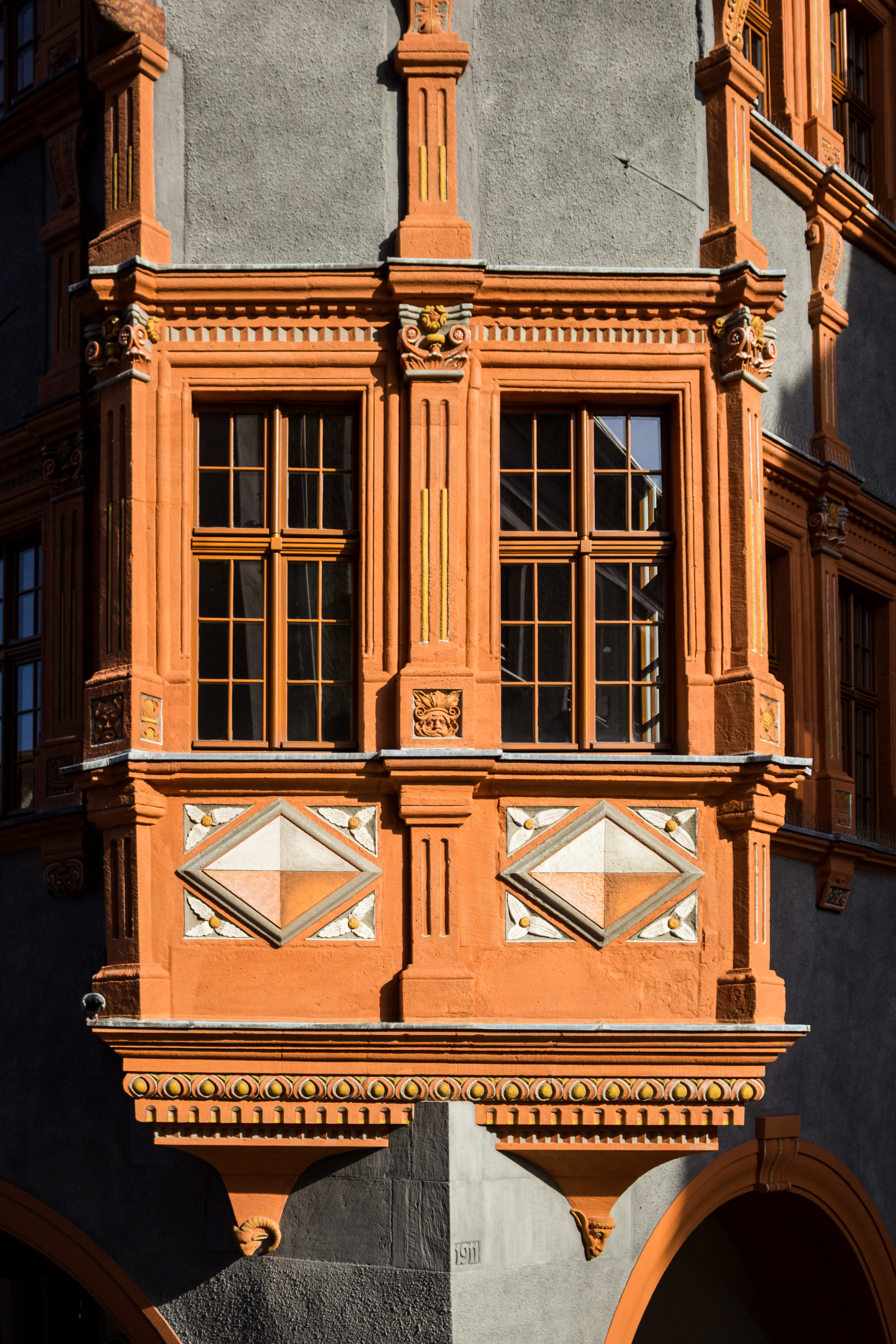
Detail bay window

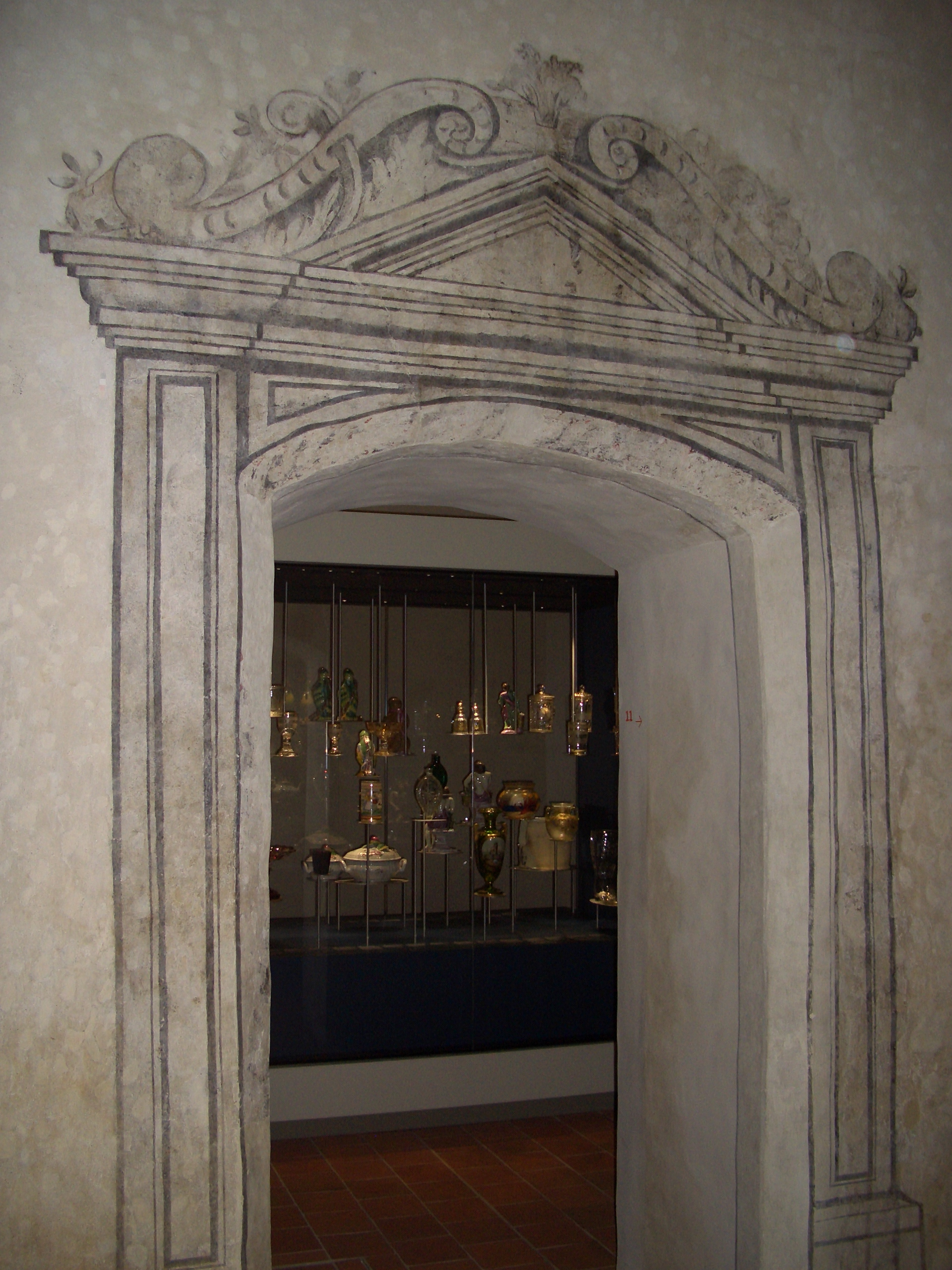
Preserved Trompe-l'œil

In 1526 Görlitz had surpassed its economic peak. Between 1510 and 1525, massive inflation occurred to the point where people could no longer buy bread. The conflict regarding Görlitz currency almost broke the Lusatian League apart. Due to the turmoil Wrocław gained back its staple rights and henceforth acted as an economic competitor. Craftsman demanded the Reformation and an ongoing plague outbreak demanded lives. To cap it all, a devastating town fire on the 12 June 1525 destroyed dozens of buildings.

To this day, the traces of fire on the masonry of the Schönhof bear witness to the town fire of 1525. Probably all flammable material inside the building was burned. The new owner, Onoffrius Schneider, an imperial colonel in the infantry and raised to the imperial peerage in Prague in 1562, seemed to have difficulties reconstructing the building – he got a part of the purchase price waived. The historian Christopf Ulricher assumes that the date 1526 on the building facade is more likely the start of the reconstruction phase rather than its completion.

Onoffrius appointed the master builder Wendel Roskopf to design the building and have it erected. When building the Schönhof in 1526, Roskopf was guided by the Vladislav Hall, the Equestrian staircase and the Courtroom of Prague Castle, where he learned the new Renaissance architecture under the master builder Benedikt Rejt.

The builder had new roofs erected, designed the facade in Renaissance style and pulled in thirteen painted wooden beam ceilings. He redesigned the entrance hall and separated the east hall. He relaid the access to the cellars, built the wide staircase in the entrance hall and built a cross vault on the second floor. He had the heating and plumbing systems relocated, thus increasing comfort. He based his room layout on the palace buildings of the time: a living room, which could be heated from the outside, was adjoined by a bedroom and toilet facilities, which could only be reached via the living room. All chambers had painted wooden beamed ceilings, wall paintings and sitting niches between massive half-columns at the windows. A black kitchen could light the staircase with its hearth fire. The wooden beams on the second floor show ornamental paintings. They are accompanied by wall paintings that have survived in remnants.

The bay window, built with a view of the town hall staircase, the gray plaster contrasting with the red window frames enclosed by elaborate pilasters, left a lasting impression on the people of Görlitz. After all, the Schönhof had to meet courtly standards. So, the Görlitz Renaissance began here.

At the same time as the Schönhof, Peterstrasse 8 was built by Onoffriu's brother Franz Schneider – also under the master builder Wendel Roskopf. All three were well-traveled, had contacts abroad and knowledge of contemporary architecture. The Schönhof and Peterstrasse 8 set standards that other builders then tried to match. Even merchants who were not among the wealthiest were able to use certain design elements for their buildings. Triggered by the Schönhof, the Renaissance style quickly caught on, although at no time was there a municipal program for it.

The ennobled Schmidt von Schmiedeburg and a gentleman Sohneundorf were the subsequent owners until 1617.

==== Build phase in 1617 ====
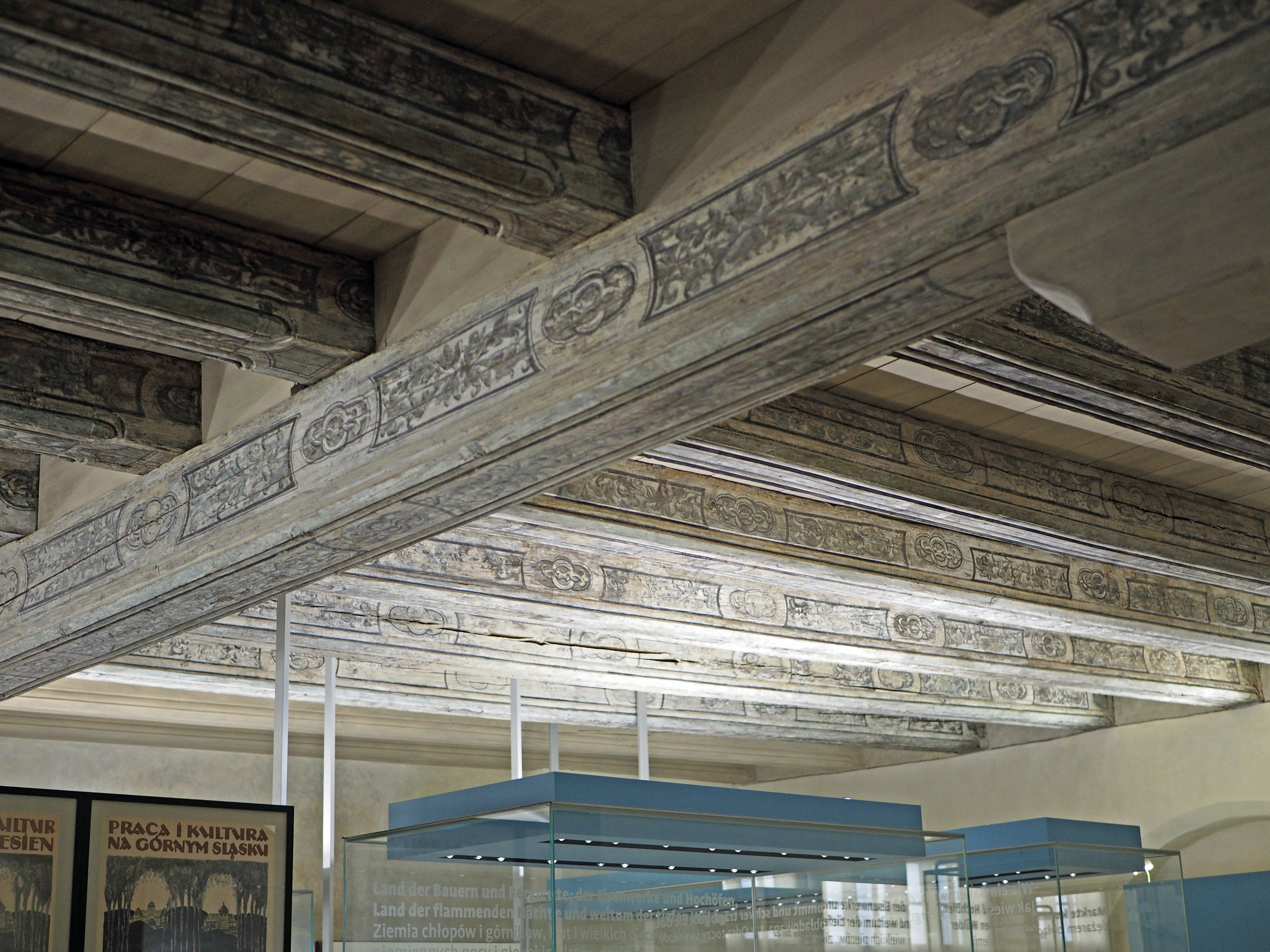
Painted wooden beam ceiling

The owner Hans Johann Glich von Miltitz had the building interiors changed in 1617. Dendrochronological research on the remains of the original substructure showed that a tower was erected that year. He also had the portal rebuilt. He provided the entrance hall and the central hall with a groined vault and a Hercules column. He had several figures erected. It is discussed in the literature whether he elevated the second floor of the left side arcade wing.

The subsequent owner was Georg Endermann, five-time mayor until 1663. His guests included nobleman Johann Georg von Brandenburg, who stayed in 1620/21, and Elector of Saxony John George I.

=== 18th century and later ===
The Schönhof was then used as a brewery for more than two centuries until the early 20th century. It had its high gable and tower removed in 1733. Nothing is known about their appearance.

Early appreciation during the industrialization prevented the demolition of the building. In 1908 the owner wanted to demolish the inn. In 1909, the city could buy it with Prussian state subsidies and thus preserve it.

== East Germany, reunification and Silesian Museum ==
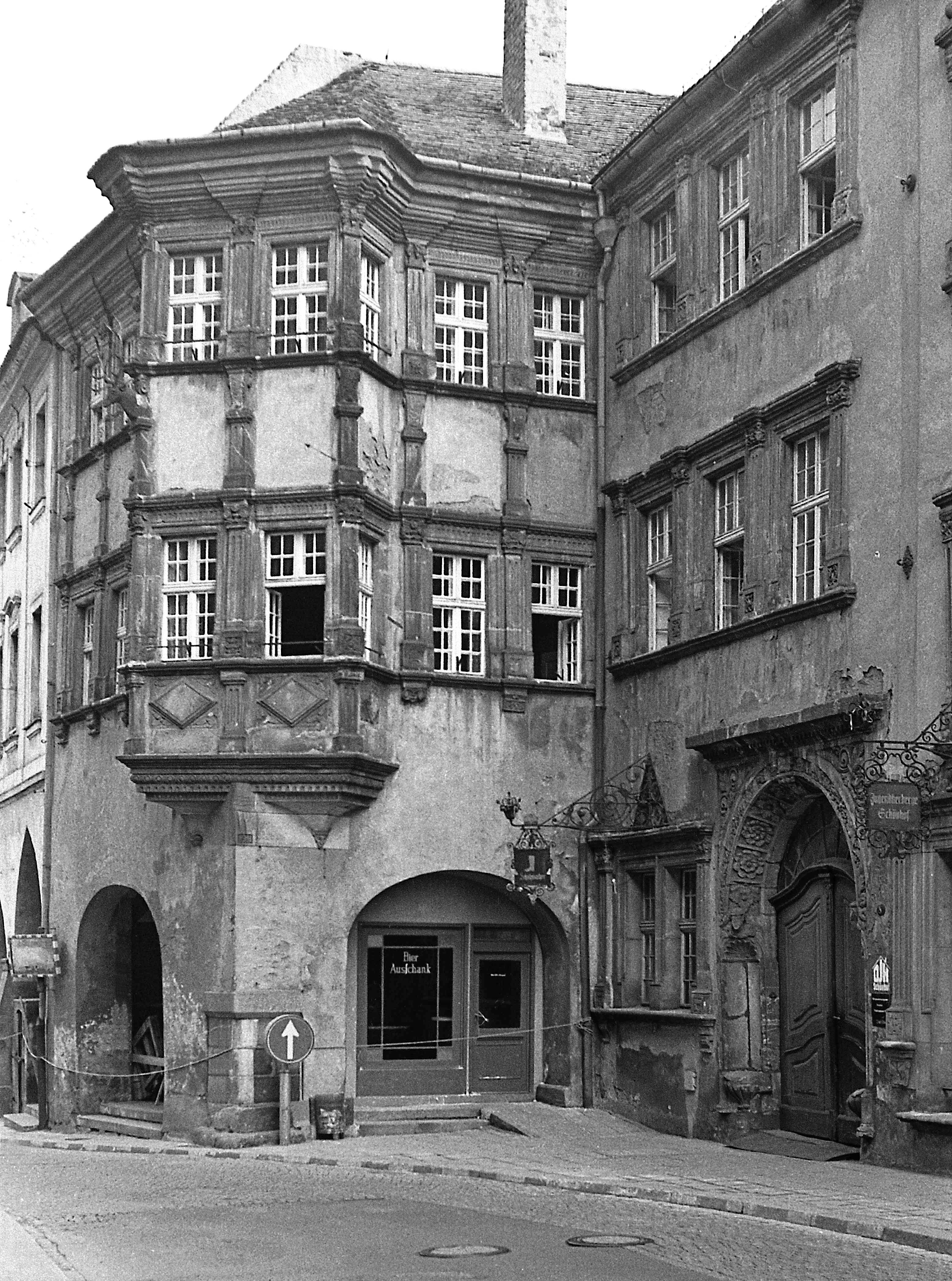
Schönhof, 1970

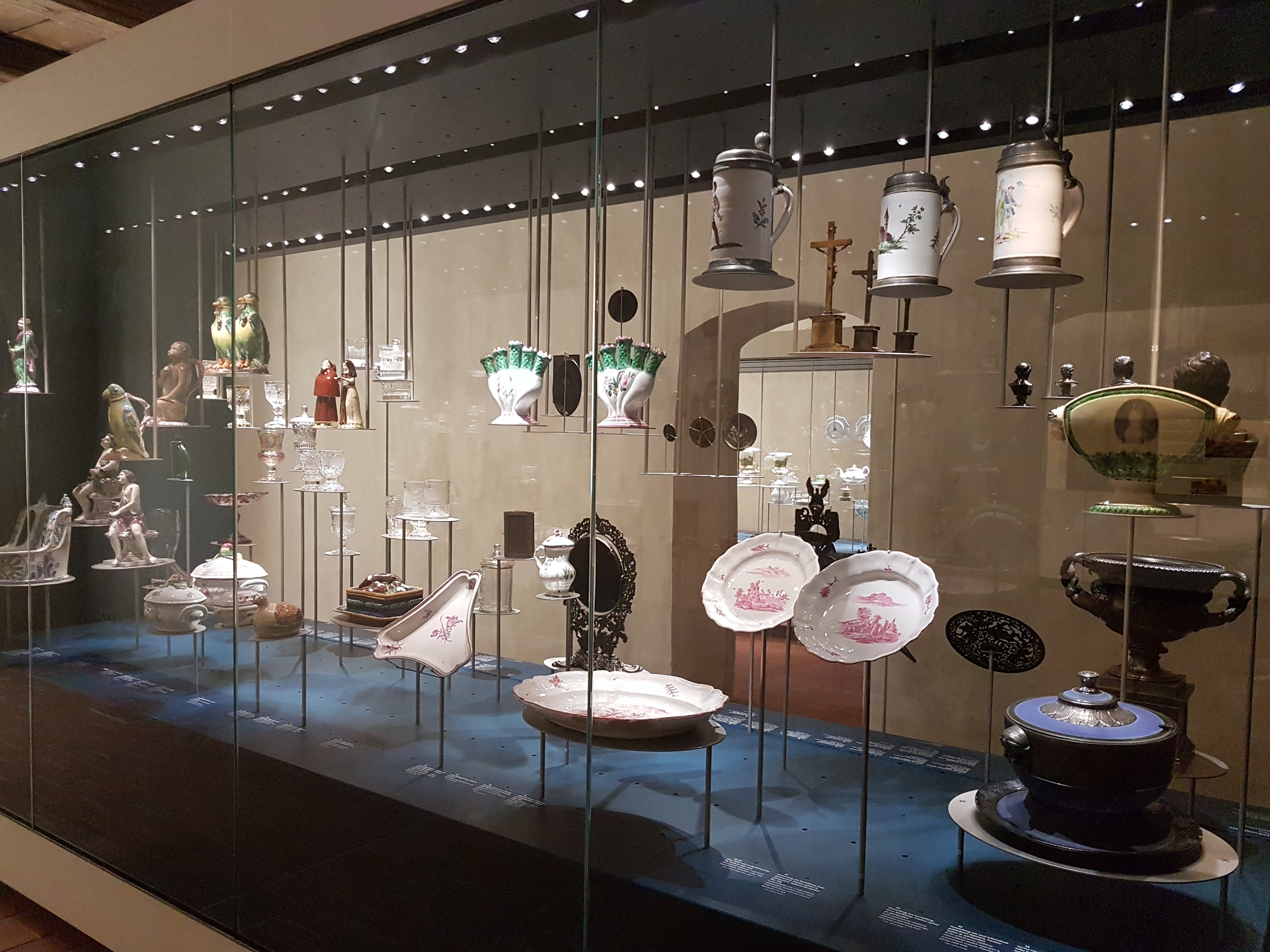
Exhibits of the Silesian Museum

In East Germany times, the building fell into disrepair. Between 1977 and 1989 there were several attempts to renovate the building. But only extensive architectural investigations could be made and paintings on walls and beamed ceilings were uncovered. With the German Reunification there were money and materials to renovate the building fundamentally and professionally. Thus, the turret of 1617 and a new gable were built in 1995. The latter was constructed freely and without historical basis.

In 2006 after extensive restoration, the building became the seat of the Silesian Museum in Görlitz. In 2000m² all important topics of Silesian cultural history are presented. The design system for the exhibition had to do justice to the special character of the building and not obscure the precious paintings. Except for a fire extinguisher, nothing may hang on the walls. The exhibits are displayed in showcases, from the inside of which the lighting must also come.

From private donations of Silesian cultural property and especially with permanent loans from the federal government, more than 12,000 exhibits were collected in Görlitz. The special feature of the "German Central Museum of Silesia" is its structure: this institution is supported by the government of Germany, the state of Saxony, the town of Görlitz and the Territorial Association of Silesia.

The exhibition starts from the late 12th century, when settlers from Thuringia and Franconia came to Silesia. Thus, one part of the exhibition is dedicated to landscapes such as the Giant Mountains and cities such as Wrocław (formerly Breslau), while another part deals with the people, language and culture.
