= Woodhouse, Shropshire =

Country house in West Felton, Shropshire, England

Coordinates: 52.853239°N 2.9456674°W

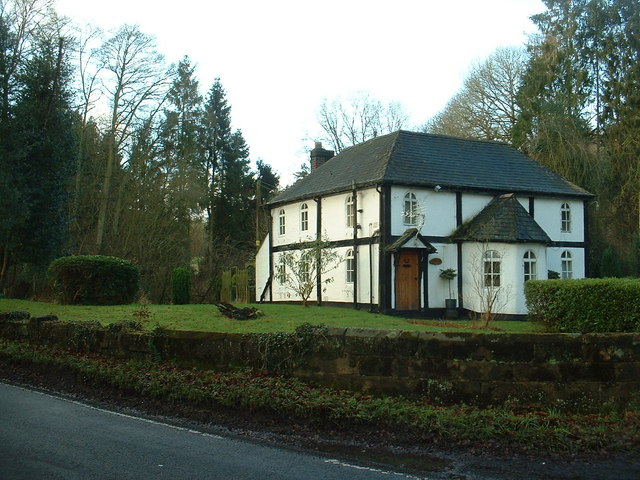
Woodhouse Lodge, only a gatehouse for the main house

Woodhouse is a Grade II* listed country house and 1,500 acre estate in West Felton, Shropshire, England.

It was built in 1773–74 by Robert Mylne for William Mostyn Owen. Born William Mostyn, he was the son of William Mostyn the elder and his wife, Grace Wynne. Upon inheriting the estate of Woodhouse from his cousin, John Lloyd Owen, William the younger changed his name to William Mostyn Owen.

In 1773, his father William Mostyn the elder had engaged Mylne to design the much more modest Bryngwyn Hall in Powys (then Montgomeryshire), Wales for himself and his wife. Bryngwyn Hall is also a Grade II listed house.

Charles Darwin was a frequent visitor from 1828 to 1833.

In 1987 Woodhouse hosted the wedding reception for the future Mayor of London, later Prime Minister, Boris Johnson and his first wife, Allegra Mostyn-Owen.

== See also ==
- Listed buildings in West Felton
