= Listed buildings in West Felton =

West Felton is a civil parish in Shropshire, England. It contains 47 listed buildings that are recorded in the National Heritage List for England. Of these, three are listed at Grade II*, the middle of the three grades, and the others are at Grade II, the lowest grade. The parish contains the village of West Felton and smaller settlements, and is otherwise rural. Most of the listed buildings are houses and associated structures, farmhouses and farm buildings, the earliest of which are timber framed. The Montgomery Canal runs through the parish and the listed buildings associated with it are a roving bridge, a warehouse, and a barge house. The other listed buildings include a church and items in the churchyard, a well, two country houses and associated structures, a road bridge, three milestones, and a disused railway station and goods shed,

== Key ==
Grade	Criteria
II*	Particularly important buildings of more than special interest
II	Buildings of national importance and special interest

== Buildings ==
Name and location	Photograph	Date	Notes	Grade
St Michael's Church; 52.82060°N 2.97909°W		12th century	The oldest part of the church is the nave, the tower dates from 1784, the north aisle was built in 1841, the chancel was rebuilt in 1848 by George Gilbert Scott, and the south aisle, porch and vestry were added in 1878–79. The church is built in sandstone with a tile roof, and consists of a nave, north and south aisles, a south porch, a chancel with a south vestry, and a west tower. The tower has three stages, with angle pilasters, two levels of oculi, round-headed bell openings, a moulded cornice and parapet, and a pyramidal roof with a weathercock.	II*
Threadneedle Well; 52.82121°N 2.97639°W	—	Medieval (probable	The well is in sandstone, and is accessed through a rectangular opening with a lintel set into a wall.	II
Abbot's Moor Farmhouse; 52.83643°N 2.93096°W	—	15th century	The farmhouse was originally timber framed with cruck construction, and was later remodelled and extended. It is in painted brick and stone with a slate roof. There are two storeys and a T-shaped plan, with a hall range and a later gabled range. On the front is a lean-to porch, and the windows are casements. Inside are three true cruck trusses.	II
Home Farmhouse; 52.80578°N 2.97637°W	—	15th century	A farmhouse, later a private house, it was originally timber framed with cruck construction, and was largely rebuilt in the 17th century in red brick. The house has a chamfered sandstone plinth, with bands, and slate roofs. There are two storeys, attics and a cellar, and a U-shaped plan with a two-bay hall range, single-bay cross-wings, and a rear extension with a crow-stepped gable. The doorway has pilasters, panelled reveals, and a flat hood. Most of the windows are sashes, and there is a casement window, a mullioned window, and a mullioned and transomed window. Inside the house are cruck trusses, timber-framed cross-walls, some wattle and daub infill, and a large inglenook fireplace.	II
The Twyfords; 52.82982°N 2.96741°W	—	16th or 17th century	The farmhouse is timber framed and rendered on a rendered brick plinth, and has a slate roof and two storeys. On the front is a lean-to porch containing ceramic tiles, and the windows are casements, those in the ground floor with segmental heads.	II
The Fords; 52.83362°N 2.97645°W	—	Early 17th century	The farmhouse has been extended and partly rebuilt. The original part is timber framed, with infill, rebuilding and extensions in red brick, painted and partly rendered on the front and with tile and slate roofs. It is partly in one storey with an attic, and partly in two storeys. There is a rough L-plan, with a two bay hall range, a lower two-bay range to the left, and a gabled cross-wing projecting to the right. One of the porches is timber framed with two storeys, with slightly projecting bressumers, one with dentilled carving, both on carved brackets. The windows are sashes, and there is a gabled dormer.	II
Grange Cottage and Old Plough Cottage; 52.82315°N 2.97012°W	—	Mid 17th century	A house, at one time an inn, and later divided into two cottages, the building is timber framed with infill and extensions in red brick, and a slate roof. There is one storey and an attic, two or three bays, and two parallel rear extensions. The doorways have slate hoods, the windows are casements, and there are two gabled dormers.	II
Heath House; 52.84266°N 2.96449°W	—	17th century (probable)	A house and integral outbuilding, remodelled and extended in the 18th century. It is partly in rendered timber framing and partly in stone, and has a slate roof. There are two storeys, three bays, and a lean-to outshut at each end. On the front is a small porch, and the windows are casements.	II
Two barns, Henbarns Farm; 52.83335°N 2.92117°W	—	Mid 17th century	The second barn was built later in the 17th century. Both are timber framed, the older one with iron cladding and weatherboarding, and the later one with painted brick infill. They are on a continuous stone plinth and have corrugated iron roofs. The older barn has a full-height threshing entrance, and the later barn has a loft and eaves hatches.	II
Smithy Cottage; 52.84581°N 2.94408°W	—	17th century	The cottage is in roughcast timber framing with a slate roof. There is one storey and an attic, two bays, and a roughcast brick lean-to at the rear. The windows are casements, and inside is an inglenook fireplace.	II
Threadneedle Cottage; 52.82100°N 2.97590°W	—	Mid 17th century (probable)	The cottage, which was altered later, is timber framed with painted brick infill and a slate roof. There are two storeys and two bays. In the centre is a doorway with a gabled hood, and the windows are casements.	II
Henbarns Farmhouse; 52.83293°N 2.92116°W	—	Late 17th century	The farmhouse is timber framed with red brick infill on a sandstone plinth, and with a slate roof. There are two storeys and an L-shaped plan, consisting of a two-bay range, and a two-bay cross-wing projecting on the right. There is a lean-to porch, and the windows are casements.	II
Barn, Manor Farm; 52.82087°N 2.97940°W	—	Late 17th century	The barn is timber framed with some weatherboarding on a stone plinth, and has a corrugated iron roof. It contains a wide threshing entrance and a doorway.	II
Barn east of Old Farmhouse; 52.82009°N 2.97542°W	—	Late 17th century	The barn is timber framed with red brick infill and a slate roof. It contains double doors, two eaves hatches, and air vents.	II
Sundial and steps 52.82037°N 2.97906°W	—	1700	The sundial is in the churchyard of St Michael's Church, and its pedestal is dated 1748. It has a short column with entasis and a moulded cap, and stands on two circular steps, possibly the base of a medieval churchyard cross.	II
Outbuilding and privy, Manor Farm; 52.82126°N 2.97921°W	—	c. 1700 (probable)	The outbuilding is timber framed with red brick infill and a slate roof. It has two levels, and contains opposing plank doors, a stable door, and windows, one of which has retained its mullions. The attached privy dates from the mid to late 18th century. It is in red brick with a dentilled eaves cornice at the rear, and a slate roof with coped verges, and contains a segmental-headed doorway.	II
L-shaped barn, The Buildings Farm; 52.84713°N 2.93740°W	—	c. 1700 (probable)	The barn is timber framed with red brick infill on a high plinth, and has a corrugated iron roof. There are two levels, an L-shaped a west range of two bays, a south range of three bays, and a single-bay brick extension to the east. The barn contains doorways, a threshing entrance, hatches, cross-shaped vents, and a small dovecote.	II
Felton Grange; 52.82382°N 2.97204°W	—	Mid 18th century	The house was altered and extended in the 19th century, and is in red brick with slate roofs. The main range has three storeys and three bays, the middle bay projecting slightly with a gable, and it is flanked by two-storey two-bay gabled wings. In the angle between the main range and the right wing is a two-bay porch with round-headed arches. The main range has canted bay windows and a French window, and the other windows are sashes.	II
Manor Farmhouse and wall 52.82111°N 2.97937°W	—	Mid 18th century	The farmhouse is in red brick on a plinth with a band, a dentilled eaves cornice, and a slate roof. There are two storeys and a cellar, three bays, a parallel gabled range at the rear on the right, and a single-storey kitchen range at right angles. The doorway has a bracketed hood, and the windows are casements, in the ground floor with chamfered stone lintels, and in the upper floor with segmental heads. At the rear are garden walls in both directions in red brick with stone coping, the one to the left with a round-arched recess and a segmental-headed doorway.	II
Barn and wall, Sutton Farm; 52.83761°N 2.95425°W	—	Mid to late 18th century	The barn was remodelled in the 19th century, incorporating fragments probably from elsewhere. It is in limestone with boulder quoins, and has a hipped slate roof. There are two levels, and it contains a casement window and re-used windows with ogee heads and Y-tracery. In the barn is a doorway with pilasters and a bracketed hood. To the left is an extension with a segmental-headed vehicle entrance, and set back to the right is another extension. The wall is in limestone with stone coping, and it contains a flat-arched opening with a large lintel.	II
Tedsmore Hall, balustrade, archway and outbuilding 52.82276°N 2.94058°W	—	1768	A country house that was remodelled in about 1837, and extended in 1878. It is in red brick, refaced on the front and right return in grey sandstone, with extensions in red sandstone, and a slate roof. It is in Tudor Revival style. There are two storeys and attics, and on the front are three gables linked by a coped parapet ending in octagonal corner piers with dome finials. The front has a central porch flanked by a two-storey canted bay window and a broad chimney breast. Attached to the right of the porch is a balustrade, the archway is attached to the billiard room, and attached to the right of the house is a gabled outbuilding.	II
Woodhouse including service range 52.85321°N 2.94574°W	—	1773–74	A country house designed by Robert Mylne, incorporating 17th-century timber framing. It is in red brick on a sandstone plinth, with sandstone dressings and a double-span hipped slate roof. There are two storeys, a continuous moulded entablature and parapet, and Ionic pilasters on the corners and main fronts. The entrance front on the east has seven bays. The centre is recessed and flanked by giant Ionic pilasters. In the recess are two giant Ionic columns, and the doorway has a broken pediment containing a carving of a double-headed eagle. The south front has nine bays, the middle three bays forming a segmental bow window with giant Ionic columns. The windows are sashes, many with segmental heads. The service range projects from the northwest corner, and has three storeys and five bays with a central pediment.	II*
Wall and outbuilding, Felton Grange; 52.82419°N 2.97222°W	—	Late 18th century	The wall and outbuilding are in red brick. The wall has stone coping, pilaster strips on the northwest side, and a ball finial at the southwest end. The outbuilding has a pyramidal slate roof with ball finials, and contains a doorway and sash windows.	II
Sandford House Farmhouse; 52.80561°N 2.97580°W		Late 18th century	The farmhouse, which may contain earlier material, was extended in the 19th century. It is in red brick on a chamfered plinth, with a dentilled eaves cornice, and a slate roof. There are two storeys, an attic and a cellar, a main block of four bays, and a two-storey rear lean-to. The doorway has pilasters, a rectangular fanlight, and a bracketed hood, and the windows are sashes with segmental heads.	II
The Brick House; 52.82336°N 2.96981°W	—	Late 18th century	The house, which was later extended, is in red brick on a plinth, partly in sandstone and partly in brick. It has a molded eaves cornice and a slate roof. There are three storeys, and an L-shaped plan with a front of three bays, and a gabled rear wing. The central doorway has pilasters, panelled reveals, a semicircular fanlight, and an open pediment. The windows are sashes, those in the lower two floors with segmental heads, and in the top floor with flat heads and fluted keystones.	II
The Buildings Farmhouse; 52.84749°N 2.93759°W	—	Late 18th century	The farmhouse, which probably incorporates earlier material, is in red brick with a stepped eaves cornice, and a slate roof with coped verges on carved stone kneelers. There are three storeys, a front of two bays, a rear gabled wing, a dairy in the angle, and two-storey ranges attached to the rear wing. The porch is gabled and the doorway has pilasters, and the windows are casements, most with segmental heads.	II
Cider press, The Nursery; 52.82711°N 2.97068°W	—	Late 18th century	The cider press is in sandstone with some brick and a slate roof. There is one storey and a loft, and it has an entrance through an elliptical arch with a stone lintel and a projecting keystone. The windows on the long sides have round heads, and in the gable ends they have segmental heads. Inside is a complete stone press.	II
Stable block and wall, Woodhouse; 52.85411°N 2.94583°W	—	Late 18th century	The stable block is in red brick with stone dressings, an impost band, and hipped slate roofs. The central part has two storeys and three bays, and is linked by single-storey wings, projecting at right angles and ending in rectangular two-storey pavilions. In the middle of the main block is a round-headed doorway flanked by wide segmental carriage arches, and above are lunettes. Elsewhere in the building are round-headed doorways and windows. Linking the stables to the service range of the house is a red brick wall with stone coping and an arcade of eight blind round-headed arches.	II*
Walls and outbuilding, Woodhouse; 52.85331°N 2.94726°W	—	Late 18th century	The walls are in red brick with stone coping. The wall attached to the house is stepped down five times to the west. The other wall surrounds the kitchen garden, and encloses an area of about 110 metres (360 ft) by 70 metres (230 ft). Incorporated into this wall is an outbuilding in red brick with a slate roof that contains some 17th-century material. It has two storeys and a stepped eaves cornice, and contains a casement window and a door approached by three steps.	II
Bridge No. 74; 52.84229°N 2.96496°W		c. 1796	A roving bridge over the Montgomery Canal, it is in red brick, and consists of a single elliptical arch. The bridge has a flat string course, a coped parapet, and a ramped approach at right-angles to each side.	II
Ice house 52.82403°N 2.93742°W	—	Late 18th to early 19th century	The ice house is in the grounds of Tedsmore Hall. The front is in limestone, and the tunnel and chamber are in brick. A short tunnel leads by a segmental arch into an egg-shaped chamber, and the whole is covered by earth.	II
Bentley memorial 52.82073°N 2.97903°W	—	c. 1816	The memorial is in the churchyard of St Michael's Church, and is to the memory of Peter Bentley and his wife. It is a chest tomb in limestone, and is rectangular with inwardly sloping short sides. The tomb has a moulded plinth and capping on ball supports, a chamfered top ledger with an urn decorated with leaf and rosette motifs, and is surmounted by a flaming torch finial. There is fishscale patterning on the long sides, and a raised oval inscription.	II
Lodge Farmhouse, stables and malthouse 52.81997°N 2.97679°W	—	Early 19th century	The farm-house, later a private house, is in red brick on a sandstone plinth, with an eaves cornice, partly moulded and partly dentilled, and a hipped slate roof. There are two storeys and three bays. In the centre is a gabled porch with fretted bargeboards and a round-headed arch with a projecting keystone. Above the door is a semicircular fanlight, and the windows are sashes. The stables to the left are in limestone with a corrugated iron roof. They have two levels, and contain five round-headed arches and two tiers of rectangular vents. The malthouse projecting to the right, is in limestone with a slate roof, and contains a door flanked by segmental-headed windows. In the gable end are three doors, one above the other, with a hoist at the top.	II
Morton Bridge; 52.80192°N 3.01971°W		Early 19th century	The bridge carries the B4396 road over the River Morda. It is in sandstone and consists of a single segmental arch. The bridge has voussoirs, a raised keystone, a string course, and rectangular end pilasters with shallow pyramidal finials. The south parapet is coped.	II
Old Farmhouse; 52.82002°N 2.97567°W	—	Early 19th century	The farmhouse is in red brick on a sandstone plinth, with a dentilled eaves cornice and a slate roof. There are two storeys, three bays, and a rear outshut. The central doorway has pilasters and a pediment, and the windows are sashes with stone wedge lintels.	II
Milestone at NGR SJ 3417 2643; 52.83151°N 2.97858°W		1826–27	The milestone is on the west side of Holyhead Road. It is in limestone, with a slightly recessed cast iron plate inscribed with the distances to Holyhead and to "SALOP" (Shrewsbury).	II
Milestone at NGR SJ 3487 2503; 52.81890°N 2.96803°W		1826–27	The milestone is on the west side of Holyhead Road. It is in limestone, with a slightly recessed cast iron plate inscribed with the distances to Holyhead and to "SALOP" (Shrewsbury).	II
Milestone at NGR SJ 3525 2350; 52.80515°N 2.96178°W		1826–27	The milestone is on the southwest side of the A5 road, It is in limestone, with a slightly recessed cast iron plate inscribed with the distances to Holyhead and to "SALOP" (Shrewsbury).	II
Twyford House; 52.82915°N 2.96899°W	—	c. 1830	A red brick house on a sandstone plinth, with a moulded eaves cornice and a parapet, and a slate roof hipped to the right and the rear. There are two storeys and three bays. In the centre is a Doric porch with a moulded entablature, and a doorway with panelled reveals. The windows are sashes with wedge lintels.	II
High House; 52.80584°N 2.97672°W	—	Early to mid 19th century	A red brick farmhouse on a sandstone plinth with a dentilled eaves cornice and a slate roof. There are three storeys, three bays, and a two-storey L-shaped rear range. In the centre is a gabled porch, and the windows are casements with segmental heads.	II
Rednal Goods Shed; 52.84144°N 2.96186°W	—	c. 1848	The goods shed, later used for other purposes, was built for the Shrewsbury and Chester Railway. It is timber framed with timber cladding, and has a slate roof. There is a rectangular plan, a square-headed wagon entrance at each end, and over the northeastern gable end is a canopy. In the southeastern front is a round-headed cart entrance.	II
Rednal Station; 52.84127°N 2.96065°W	—	1848	The station, since closed, was built for the Shrewsbury and Chester Railway, and designed by Thomas Penson in Tudor Revival style. It is built in brick with stone dressings and a slate roof. The main block has two storeys and there is a single-storey wing to the southeast. The entrance is through a gabled projection, and it has a moulded Tudor arch with caving in the spandrels. The other doorways have moulded surrounds, and the windows are mullioned and transomed. On the gable end of the wing is a finial.	II
Canal Warehouse; 52.84234°N 2.96472°W		Mid 19th century	The warehouse by the side of the Montgomery Canal has two storeys, the lower storey is in brick, and the upper storey is timber framed with brick infill. The gables have wood slatting and plain bargeboards. The warehouse contains loading doors on three sides.	II
Archway near The Nursery; 52.82629°N 2.97032°W	—	Mid 19th century (probable)	The archway in a wall probably re-uses some 13th-century material. It is in sandstone, and the arch is pointed and chamfered and has a hood mould, There are four orders of shafts with plain moulded capitals and plinths.	II
Pump and basin, The Fords; 52.83373°N 2.97664°W	—	Mid to late 19th century	The pump is in cast iron, and has a fluted cap, a decorated spout, a pointed dome finial, and a slightly curved handle. The basin is in stone and is rectangular with one end rounded.	II
Disused barge house 52.83485°N 2.98136°W	—	Late 19th century (probable)	The former barge house has two levels. It is in purple engineering brick with corrugated iron cladding on the upper level, and a corrugated iron roof. It contains four square-headed openings flanked by narrower openings.	II
Pump and basin, Woodhouse; 52.85407°N 2.94566°W	—	Late 19th century (probable)	The pump in the yard of the stable block is in painted cast iron, and has a plain shaft with a low circular spout. The stone basin is roughly oval-shaped.	II
