= Grimpo =

Coordinates: 52.832°N 2.947°W

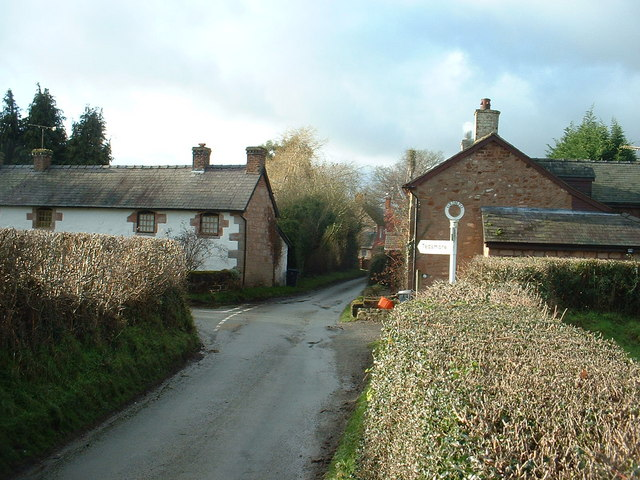
- Road junction at Grimpo

- Location within Shropshire
- OS grid reference: SJ362265
- Civil parish: West Felton
- Unitary authority: Shropshire
- Ceremonial county: Shropshire
- Region: West Midlands
- Country: England
- Sovereign state: United Kingdom
- Post town: OSWESTRY
- Postcode district: SY11
- Dialling code: 01691
- Police: West Mercia
- Fire: Shropshire
- Ambulance: West Midlands
- UK Parliament: North Shropshire

Grimpo is a small hamlet in Shropshire, England. Its unusual name was formerly written Grimpool, and is possibly based on an Old English personal name. It developed as a settlement of squatter's cottages on the edge of unenclosed marshland.

Grimpo is in the civil parish of West Felton, which lies a short distance to the west.
