= David Carritt =

British art historian (1927–1982)

- Born: Hugh David Graham Carritt; 15 April 1927; London, England
- Died: 3 August 1982 (aged 55); Mount Street, London, England
- Education: Rugby School
- Alma mater: Christ Church, Oxford
- Occupations: Art historian, dealer and critic

Hugh David Graham Carritt (15 April 1927 – 3 August 1982) was a British art historian, dealer and critic, who was described by The New York Times as being "responsible for more sensational discoveries in the field of Old Master painting since World War II than any other man".

== Early life ==
Hugh David Graham Carritt was born on 15 April 1927, the only son of the musician and lecturer Reginald Graham Carritt and his wife Christian Norah Begg, of 2 Royal Avenue, Chelsea, London. He had an older sister and a twin sister. He attended Rugby School before reading modern history at Christ Church, Oxford where he won an open scholarship, but graduated with a third-class degree in 1948.

== Career ==
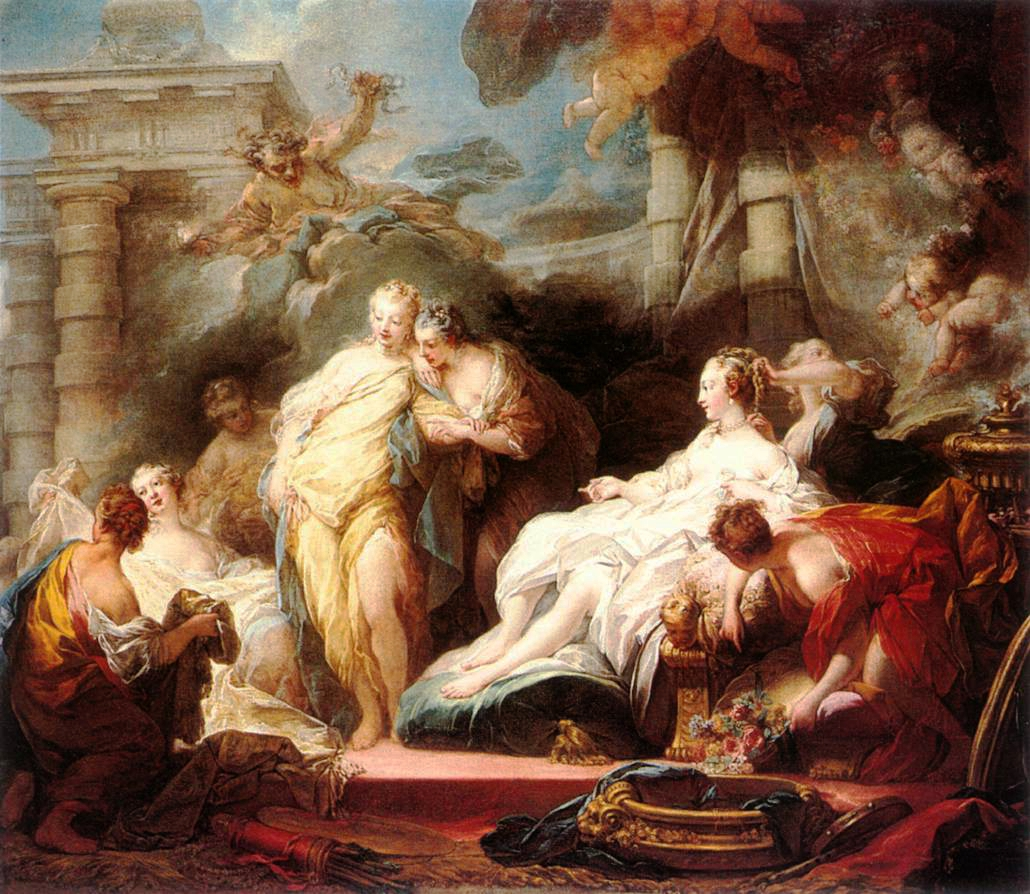
Jean-Honoré Fragonard – Psyche showing her Sisters her Gifts from Cupid

After university, Carritt worked for himself as an art dealer, and wrote on art for the Burlington Magazine, the Evening Standard, and The Spectator.

In 1952, at the age of 25, Carritt discovered a painting by Caravaggio in the remote home of a British Navy retired surgeon captain. The Concert is now owned by New York's Metropolitan Museum of Art.

He joined the auction house Christie's in London, alongside William Mostyn-Owen, Noël Annesley, and Brian Sewell, becoming a director in 1964. According to The Independent, Sewell "conceived a violent dislike of Carritt, a colleague who committed the dual sins of being a better connoisseur and a Rugbeian".

At a "heavily attended auction" of works from Lord Rosebery's Mentmore Towers collection in 1977, Carritt realised that The Toilet of Venus, attributed to Carle van Loo, a minor painter, was a painting by Jean-Honoré Fragonard, Psyche Showing her Sisters her Gifts from Cupid. He bought it for £8,000 (or about $14,000), and in 1978 it was acquired by London's National Gallery for £495,000.

At the cottage of Joan, Lady Baird, he discovered an unrecorded painting by Rogier van der Weyden, which is now in London's National Gallery. He also discovered an allegorical painting by Giovanni Battista Tiepolo on the ceiling of the dining room of the Egyptian embassy in London. In a shed in Dublin, he found five large and very dirty canvases by Francesco Guardi.

He founded David Carritt Limited, which is now known as Artemis Fine Arts.

== Personal life ==
Carritt was gay. According to Michael Bloch's biography of the politician, Carritt had an affair with Jeremy Thorpe in the late 1950s.

He died of cancer on 3 August 1982 in his London flat at 120 Mount Street, aged 55.
