= Aberuchill Castle =

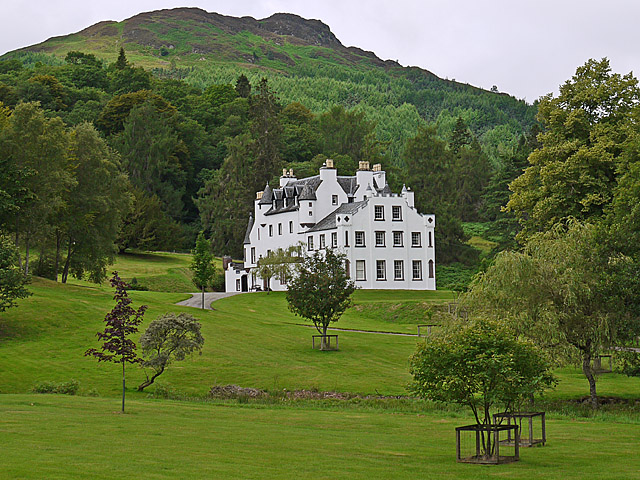
- Aberuchill Castle in 2010

- Location of Aberuchill Castle in Perth and Kinross
- 56.3660°N 4.0330°W
- Location: Comrie, Perthshire, Scotland

History
- Built: 17th century, extended 19th century
- Built for: Clan Campbell, Clan Drummond

Listed Building – Category A
- Designated: 5 October 1971
- Reference no.: LB5296

Inventory of Gardens and Designed Landscapes in Scotland
- Official name: Aberuchill Castle
- Criteria: Architectural; Scenic
- Designated: 1 July 1987
- Reference no.: GDL00004

Aberuchill Castle is located 3 kilometres (1.9 mi) west of Comrie in Perthshire, Scotland. It comprises an early 17th-century tower house, which was extended and remodelled in the 19th century. The house, excluding the later west wing, is protected as a category A listed building, while the grounds are included in the Inventory of Gardens and Designed Landscapes in Scotland.

== History ==
In 1596 the lands of Aberuchill were granted to the Campbell family of Lawers. The earliest part of the tower house is dated 1602. In 1642 Aberuchill was acquired by Sir James Drummond, and was retained by his descendants until 1858. The gothic east wing was added to the tower house by the Drummonds, and the interiors remodelled, in the early 19th century.

The house was purchased by Sir David Dundas of Dunira in 1858, who sold it on to English cotton merchant George Dewhurst of Lymm, Cheshire, in 1864. Between 1869 and 1874 the west wing and further additions were made, by the Aberdeen architect Robert Ewan.

Aberuchill was 'burned down' in a suffragette attack on 4 February 1914, and the castle's servants were fortunate to escape.

Aberuchill Castle was inherited by William Mostyn-Owen on the death of his father in 1947, and he was living there in "23 rooms or so" of one wing with his wife, the Italian writer Gaia Servadio, in 1968, but eventually sold it.

The estate was sold by the Dewhursts in the 1980s, and remains in private ownership. In 2005 it was reported that Russian steel tycoon Vladimir Lisin had purchased the castle and its 3,000-acre (1,200 ha) estate for £6.8 million.
