= West Felton =

Village in Shropshire, England

Coordinates: 52.824°N 2.971°W

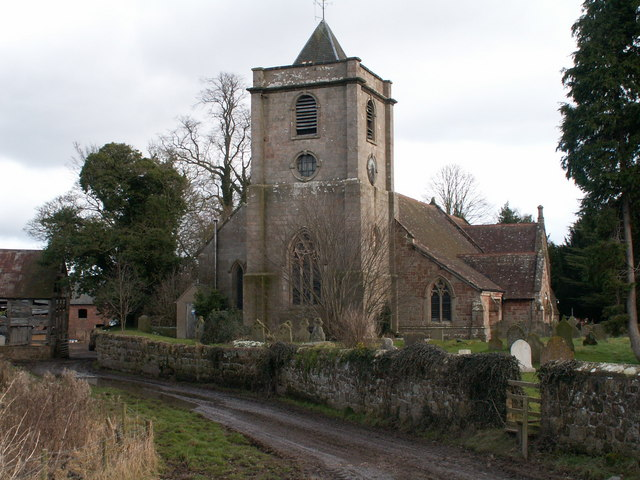
- St Michael's Church, West Felton

- Location within Shropshire
- Population: 1,475 (2011)
- OS grid reference: SJ345256
- Civil parish: West Felton
- Unitary authority: Shropshire
- Ceremonial county: Shropshire
- Region: West Midlands
- Country: England
- Sovereign state: United Kingdom
- Post town: OSWESTRY
- Postcode district: SY11
- Dialling code: 01691
- Police: West Mercia
- Fire: Shropshire
- Ambulance: West Midlands
- UK Parliament: North Shropshire

West Felton is a village and civil parish near Oswestry in Shropshire, England. At the 2001 census the parish, which also includes the settlements of Rednal, Grimpo and Haughton, had a population of 1,380, increasing to 1,475 at the 2011 Census.

== History ==
The village originally grew around a Norman castle, whose motte lies next to the church. It was recorded in the Domesday Book of 1086 as Feltone, and as "Felton by le Knokyn" in 1303. The name Felton probably represents a combination of Old English feld, "open land", and tun, "settlement".

The old ecclesiastical parish of West Felton contained the townships of West Felton, Sutton, Rednal, Haughton, Tedsmore (the latter five originally part of the eleven townships forming the mediaeval manor of neighbouring Ruyton-XI-Towns), Woolston (now in Oswestry Rural), Sandford and Twyford. The modern civil parish has similar, though not identical, boundaries.

The parish church, which has a 12th-century nave, is dedicated to St Michael, and has a chapel of ease at Haughton.

== Notable people ==
- The ornithologist and poet John Freeman Milward Dovaston was born in Twyford in 1782.
- Nonconformist historian and lawyer Sir John Bickerton Williams was born at Sandford Hall in 1792.
- Benjamin Hall Kennedy, previously Headmaster of Shrewsbury School, was Rector of West Felton from 1866 to 1868.
- Boer War Victoria Cross recipient General Sir Walter Congreve had his home at West Felton Grange from 1903 to 1924. His son William was killed in the First World War and was posthumously awarded the Victoria Cross. Their military service in the latter war is recorded in one of the Rolls of Honour books at St Michael's Church. The former gave land to the Church of England for the erection of a community facility called the Haslehurst Institute.
- Boris Johnson married at St Michael's Church to Allegra Mostyn-Owen on 5 September 1987, with their wedding reception held at her nearby family country home of Woodhouse. They divorced in 1993, whereafter Boris Johnson remarried. Allegra's father, William Mostyn-Owen, who owned the Woodhouse estate from inheriting it in 1947 until his death in 2011, was an art historian.

== See also ==
- Listed buildings in West Felton
