= Roving bridge =

Type of canal bridge

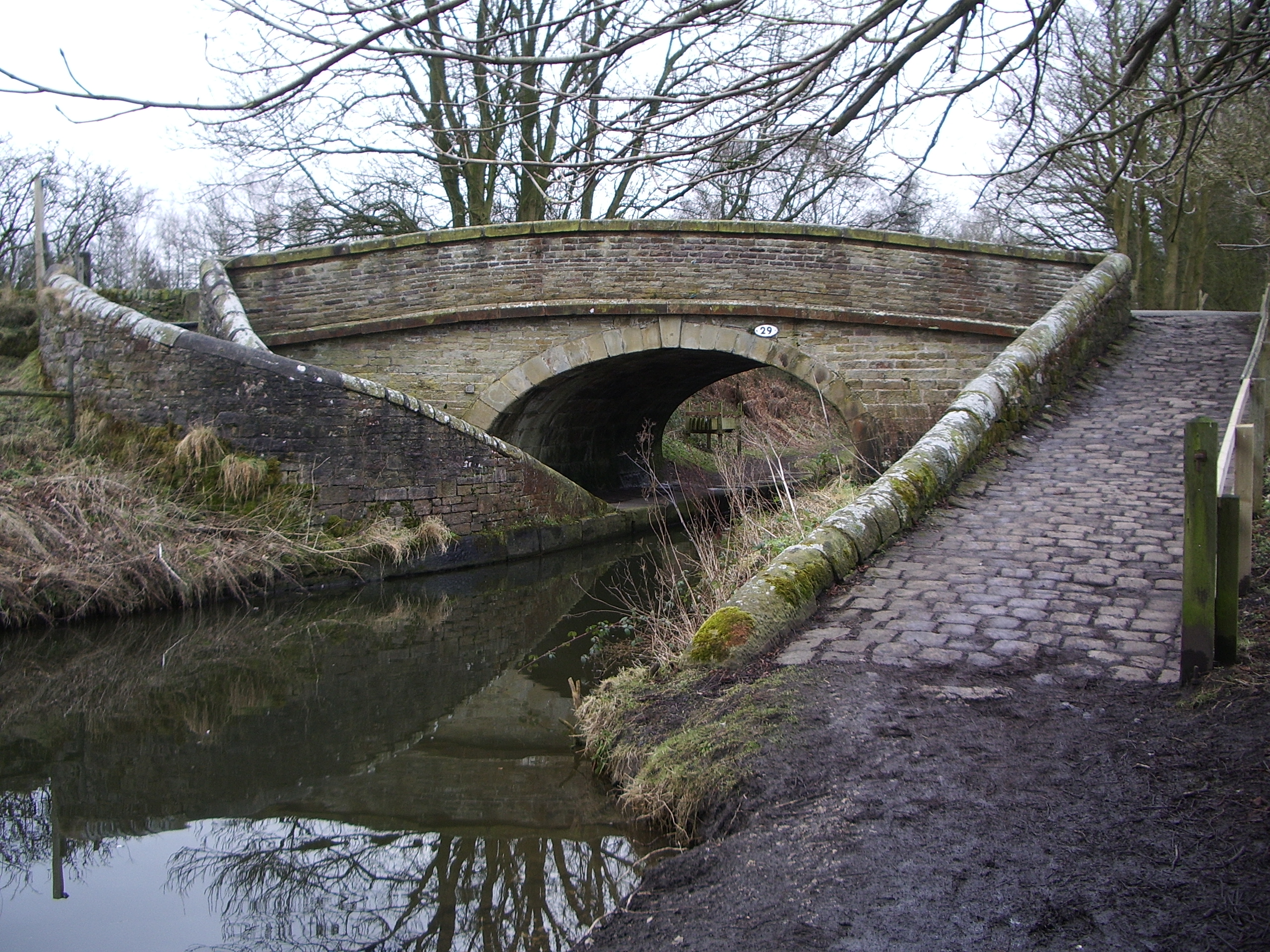
- Stone-built roving bridge 29 with spiral ramp on the Macclesfield Canal
- Carries: horses, pedestrians
- Crosses: canals, river navigations

Changing towpaths without unhitching the tow line: 1. Failure to consider the issue; 2. Tow line passing through a slot; 3. Running the path under the bridge; 4. Using a dedicated roving bridge

A roving bridge, changeline bridge, turnover bridge, or snake bridge is a bridge over a canal or navigable river constructed to allow a horse towing a boat to cross the waterway when the towpath changes sides. This often occurred because of the presence of buildings or riparian water rights, where a landowner needed their cattle to be able to access the water without getting in the way of passing boats and horses.

== History ==
If a conventional bridge was built where the towpath changed sides, the boatman would have to unhitch the towline from the horse, and re-attach it when the horse was on the other bank. A roving bridge was designed so that the towline could remain attached throughout the crossing. The term changeline bridge was particularly used on the Leeds and Liverpool Canal, while elsewhere they were usually called turnover bridges. They are often known as roving bridges, although this was not a term used by boatmen when the primary use of the canals was for commercial traffic. On some canals, bridges were built in two halves, with a slot between them, through which the towline could be passed. Such a bridge was also known as a split bridge.

On some canals roving bridges were constructed by placing the two ramps on the same side of the bridge, which turned the horse through 360 degrees. The Macclesfield Canal has bridges with spiral ramps, which meant that the horse did not have to turn back on itself once it had crossed the bridge. The Stratford-upon-Avon Canal have several cast-iron split bridges, where the towpath changes sides, but for cost reasons used the same design for ordinary bridges where there was no need for the horse to cross them. A good example of a brick-built roving bridge is at High Onn on the Shropshire Union Canal. This has an unusual skewed arch where it crosses the canal, due to the presence of an adjacent road bridge which is also skewed. The bridge was designed by Thomas Telford and constructed in 1830-33. The south parapet forms two wing walls for the curving ramps which return the horse to towpath level. There are cast-iron fenders which protect the brickwork from being worn away by ropes rubbing on it, and the towpath beneath the bridge is paved with bricks. The structure is grade II listed because of its historical value.

There is a stone turnover bridge at Hyde on the Peak Forest Canal. It is next to a road bridge, both of which were built in 1804 and are grade II listed. The towpath bridge has a spiral ramp on its western side, while the parapet walls have cast-iron panelling. There is a well-preserved example of a split bridge on the Stratford-upon-Avon Canal at Old Stratford and Drayton, just to the south of lock 43, which is part of the Wilmcote flight of 11 locks. The parapets at the sides are of brick with stone coping stones, while the central section is of cast iron, with a slot between the two halves. It dates from 1814, and was a feature of the canal as constructed, although the brick abutments have been repaired several times subsequently.

Bridges were also necessary at canal junctions and where the towpath was interrupted by side arms. These are strictly speaking side bridges, but they are often referred to as roving bridges. Well-known ones occur at Hawkesbury Junction where the Oxford Canal meets the Coventry Canal, and at Haywood Junction where the Staffordshire and Worcestershire Canal joins the Trent and Mersey Canal. The Birmingham Canal Navigations has many examples, mainly of cast iron, which date from the 1820s when Thomas Telford made large changes to the system. The bridges were produced by the Horseley Ironworks at Tipton. Two examples span the junctions with the Rotton Park Loop, both of which are grade II listed. That at its eastern end dates from 1828, and is of slightly lighter construction than many Horseley bridges, while that at its western end dates from 1854, and is more highly decorated than usual.

The ramps of the bridge are typically studded with alternating rows of protruding bricks to prevent the feet of the horse from sliding. The bridge may be constructed of cast iron (particularly in industrial areas) or of more conventional brick or stone.

== Gallery ==
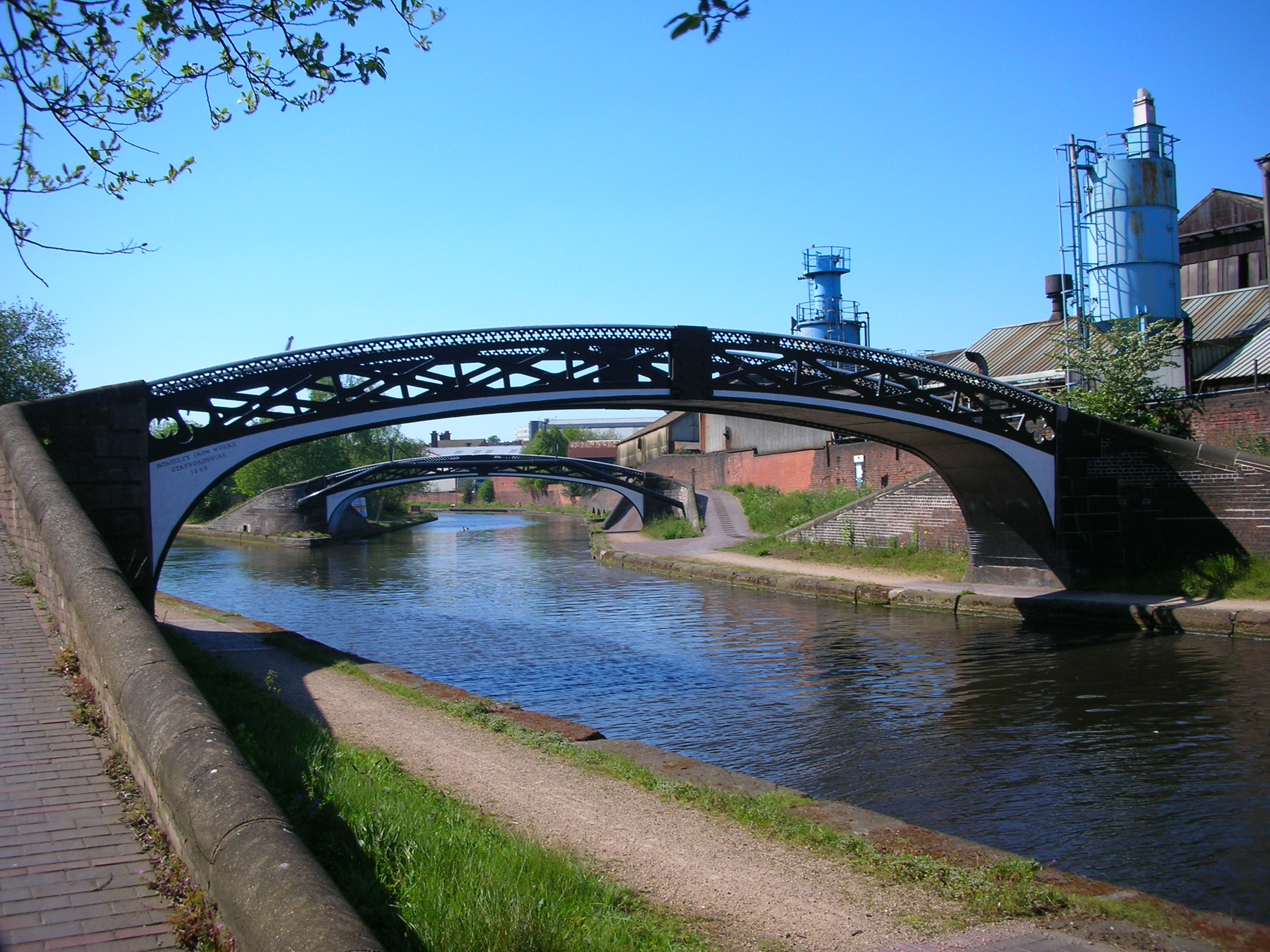
Two locally made Horseley Ironworks roving bridges at Smethwick Junction on the Birmingham Main Line Canal

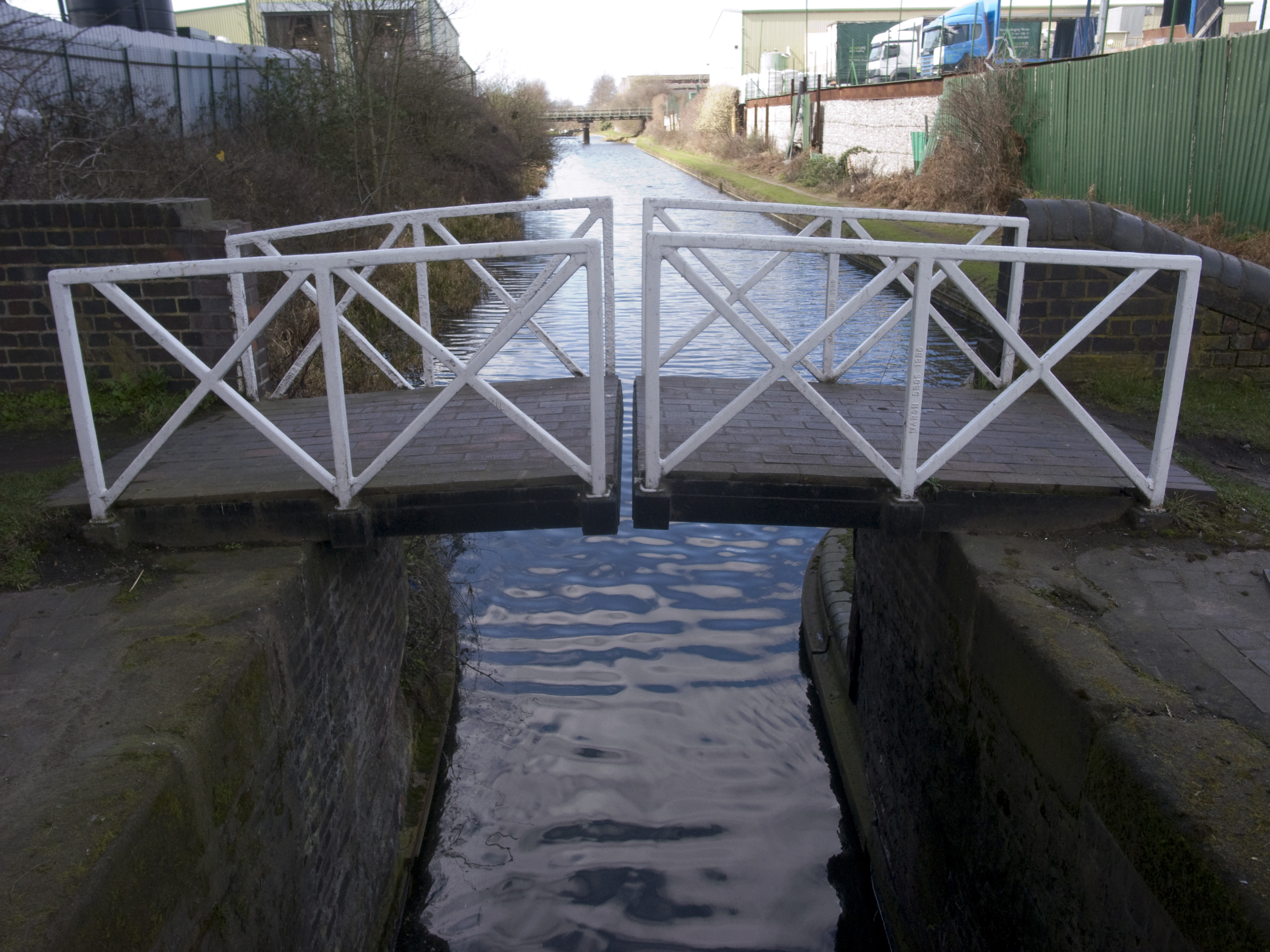
Split bridge at Spon Lane top lock, Smethwick

== See also ==
- Canals of the United Kingdom
- History of the British canal system
- Mule ramp
- Spiral bridge
- Horse-drawn boat
- Narrowboat
- Widebeam boat
