= Jane Martineau =

British art historian

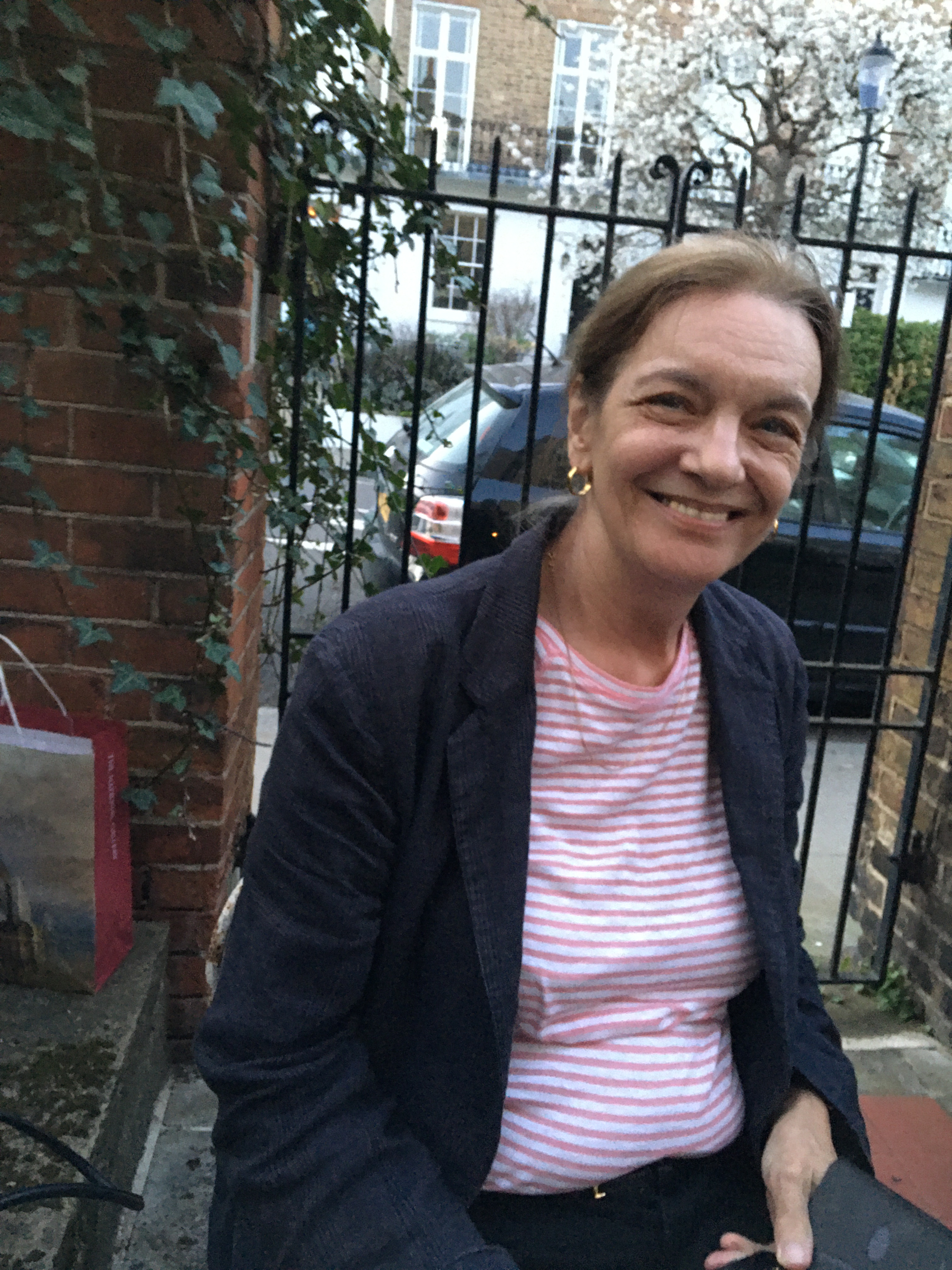
Jane Martineau - art historian

Jane Martineau is a British art historian, and was acting editor of The Burlington Magazine.

Martineau received a bachelor's degree in 1969. Martineau worked at London's Royal Academy of Arts as curator and editor in the Exhibitions Office from 1982 to 1984, and from 1989 to 1998, was deputy editor of the Grove Dictionary of Art for six years, and co-curated exhibitions in a freelance capacity on the Gonzaga family (V&A, 1982) and Shakespeare in Art (Ferrara and Dulwich 2003). From 2004, she was associate editor at The Burlington Magazine, rising to acting editor.

In 1992, she married fellow art historian William Mostyn-Owen (1929–2011), becoming his third wife.

== Publications ==
- Shakespeare in Art
- Andrea Mantegna
- The Genius of Venice, 1500–1600, edited with Charles Hope
- The Glory of Venice: Art in the Eighteenth Century, edited with Andrew Robison
