= Gaia Servadio =

Italian writer (1938–2021)

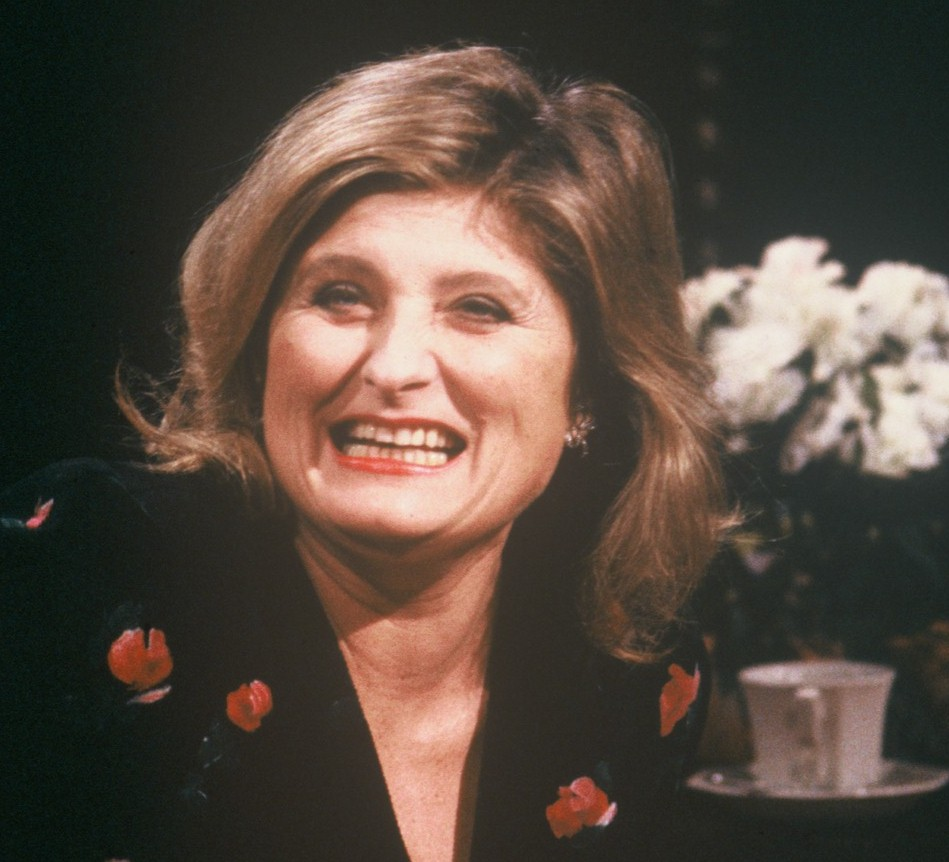
- Hosting After Dark in 1988
- Born: Gaia Cecilia Metella Servadio; 13 September 1938; Padua, Italy
- Died: 20 August 2021 (aged 82); Rome, Italy
- Occupation: Writer
- Spouse(s): William Mostyn-Owen (c. 1961–1989); Hugh Myddelton (c. 1995-2021)
- Children: 3, including Allegra Mostyn-Owen

Gaia Cecilia Metella Servadio (13 September 1938 – 20 August 2021) was an Italian writer.

== Early life and career ==
Servadio was born in Padua, the daughter of industrial chemist Luxardo Servadio and wife Bianca Prinzi. Her father was Jewish and her mother was Sicilian and Catholic. She received a bachelor's degree from London's Camberwell School of Art.

Her first novel Tanto gentile e tanto onesta, aka Melinda, was published in 1967 by Feltrinelli in Italy and Weidenfeld & Nicolson in the UK, and was "a runaway success".

== Personal life ==
Servadio was married to the British art historian William Mostyn-Owen c. 1961–1989, and they had three children, Owen (b. 1962), Allegra (b. 1964) and Orlando (b. 1973). In 1968, they were living in "23 rooms or so" of one wing of Aberuchill Castle, Perthshire, Scotland.

Their daughter Allegra, an art teacher, was the first wife of the politician Boris Johnson. Their son Orlando is an artist and a painter.

Servadio lived in Belgravia, London. Following her divorce from Mostyn-Owen, in 1995 Servadio married Hugh Robert Myddelton, of Chirk Castle in Wales, another former Etonian. In 2001 their surname was changed to Myddelton Biddulph, and they became Hugh Robert Myddelton Biddulph and Gaia Servadio Myddelton Biddulph. They remained married until her death. She died on 20 August 2021.

== Works ==
=== Fiction ===
- Tanto gentile e tanto onesta (Feltrinelli, 1967)
- Don Giovanni e L'azione consiste (Feltrinelli, 1968)
- Il Metodo. Milano: Feltrinelli. 1970.
- Un'infanzia diversa (Rizzoli, 1988)
- Il lamento di Arianna (La Tartaruga, 1988)
- La storia di R. (Rizzoli, 1990)
- Abramo, La vallata. 1990.
- E i morti non sanno (Dario Flaccovio Ed., 2005)
- Raccogliamo le vele - Autobiografia (Feltrinelli, 2014)
- Servadio, Gaia (2017). Didone Regina. Milano: Frassinelli. ISBN 97-88-89342-023-5.
- Giudei, Milano, Bompiani, 2021.

=== Music ===
- La vera Traviata. Libretto, in Angelo Inglese, cantata scenica in un prologo, 7 scene ed epilogo, 2013.
- The Last Zodiac, Poems, in Marcello Panni, 12 Lieder for voice and orchestra, 2015.

=== Non-fiction ===
- Angelo La Barbera. A profile of a Mafia Boss, London, Quartet Books, 1974.
- Mafioso. A history of the Mafia from its origins to the present day, London, Martin Secker & Warburg Ltd, 1976.
- To a Different World, London, Hamish Hamilton 1979.
- Luchino Visconti, Mondadori, 1980.
- La Donna del Rinascimento, Garzanti, 1986.
- Traviata. Vita di Giuseppina Strepponi, Rizzoli, 1994.
- Servadio, Gaia (1993). Incontri. Forster, Sraffa, Lowell, Matta, McCarthy. Abramo. ISBN 978-88-8324-056-0.
- Mozia. Alla scoperta di una civiltà scomparsa, Flaccovio Dario, 2003.
- Servadio, Gaia (2004). Rossini. Una vita. Dario Flaccovio. ISBN 978-88-7758-554-7.
- Sammezzano, London, Idea Books, 2007.
- Il Rinascimento allo specchio, Milano, Salani, 2007.
- Gods, Sailors and Merchants. The Whitakers and Marsala wine, Torino, Allemandi&C, 2009
- Incoronata pazza. Il mistero di Giovanna, figlia di re, madre di re, regina sacrificata, Milano, Salani, 2010.
- C'è del marcio in Inghilterra, Milano, Salani, 2011.
- Poetry. Tuscany and Umbria, a collection of Poetry of Place, London, Eland, 2011.
- Gioachino Rossini Una vita, Feltrinelli 2015.
- I viaggi di Dio, Milano, Feltrinelli, 2016.
- L'italiano più famoso del mondo: vita e avventure di Giovanni Belzoni, Milano, Bompiani, 2018.
- A Wartime Childhood, London, John Sandoe, 2020.

=== Curatorial ===
- Ancient Syrian writings: Syrian preclassical and classical texts, Damascus, General Secretariat of Damascus, 2009. Government publication.
