= John Freeman Milward Dovaston =

British poet and naturalist

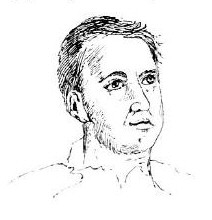
- Sketched portrait of "Crazy Jack" Dovaston by James William Giles
- Born: 30 December 1782; Twyford, West Felton, Shropshire
- Died: 8 August 1854 (aged 71)
- Other name: Crazy Jack of Christ Church
- Occupations: poet and naturalist

John Freeman Milward Dovaston (30 December 1782 – 8 August 1854) was a British poet and naturalist.

== Life and work ==
Dovaston was born in Twyford, West Felton, Shropshire in an estate called "The Nursery" that was started by his father John Dovaston (1740–1808). Dovaston Sr. became interested in botany after a trip to the West Indies and began to work with plants and planting. John Dovaston Sr. cultivated the Dovaston yew, Taxus baccata Dovastonii, and provided Charles Darwin’s father, Robert Darwin, with a young Dovaston yew, which was planted in the gardens of their home, The Mount. Dovaston junior studied at Oswestry Grammar School and Shrewsbury School before going to Oxford to study law.

At Christ Church, Oxford, he was nicknamed "Crazy Jack of Christ Church". After receiving a Master of Arts degree, he was admitted to the bar in 1807. He however did not like the practice and when his father died the next year, he moved back to his estate. Dovaston wrote letters to gentlemen's magazines, sometimes under the pen name of "Von Osdat" (an anagram of his surname) and his writings even to more learned journals such as the Magazine of Natural History included light-hearted verse.

Dovaston became a friend of the Newcastle upon Tyne wood engraver Thomas Bewick, and offered additions and corrections to the fifth edition of his History of British Birds. In his letters to Bewick, he introduced many of his innovations, including what he called an "ornithotrophe" (punning with "trough" and the Greek word for trophy), a hanging bird feeder. He also experimented with artificial nest boxes. In an 1825 letter to Bewick, he described the observations he made using a small spyglass that he called an "ornithoscope". John Denson, the editor of the Magazine of Natural History, had also been using a spyglass since 1823, although the use of these devices for observing birds grew only after a letter in 1830 by an observer who abhorred killing birds.

Dovaston also experimented with growing mistletoes on trees, fencing off grasslands to study hares, and trying to document bird calls with musical notation. He made a neck ring using cello wire to ring swallows, and noted that four of the birds returned the next year. He found that individual birds had their own specific beats or haunts and rarely intruded into the territories of others. He was among the first to attempt to map and demarcate the boundaries of robin territories.

== Works ==
- Fitz Gwarine with other rhymes, 1812.
- A selection of British melodies, 1817.
- The Dove, 1822.
- Lectures on natural history and national melody, 1839.
