= William Mostyn-Owen =

British art historian (1929–2011)

- Born: 10 May 1929
- Died: 2 May 2011 (aged 81)
- Education: Eton College
- Alma mater: Magdalene College, Cambridge
- Occupation: Art historian
- Spouse(s): Gaia Servadio (c. 1961–1989); Faith Clark Jane Martineau (m. 1992)
- Children: 3, including Allegra Mostyn-Owen

William "Willy" Mostyn-Owen (10 May 1929 – 2 May 2011) was a British art historian. He worked for some years with the art expert Bernard Berenson, and was his bibliographer. He was connected with the auctioneers Christie's for 30 years.

== Early life ==
William Mostyn-Owen was born on 10 May 1929 to Lt-Col Roger Arthur Mostyn-Owen (1888–1947) and wife Margaret Eva Dewhurst. The Mostyn-Owen family were military landed gentry of Woodhouse, Shropshire. He had three older brothers and a sister. His brothers all died during the Second World War, and his father died while William was in his teens, so that he inherited the family seat of Woodhouse and the Dewhurst family's Aberuchill Castle, Perthshire, at a young age. He was educated at Eton and Magdalene College, Cambridge.

== Career ==
After his graduation, Mostyn-Owen worked for the Fogg Museum at Harvard and the Metropolitan Museum of Art in New York City. In the 1950s, he spent six years working closely with Bernard Berenson, the art expert, at his Villa I Tatti near Florence, and acquired a deep understanding of the art of the Italian Renaissance. In Florence, the British consul commented that Mostyn-Owen was "worth a battleship" for his charm and tact when dealing with American President Harry S. Truman, the King of Norway Haakon VII and other visiting dignitaries.

He joined the auction house Christie's in London, alongside David Carritt, Noel Annesley, and Brian Sewell, and worked there for almost thirty years. He became a director in 1968, and chairman of Christie's Education from 1979 to 1988.

== Personal life ==
Mostyn-Owen's first wife from 28 September 1960 to 1989 was the Italian writer Gaia Servadio, with whom he had three children, Owen (born 1962), Allegra (born 1964) and Orlando (born 1973). In 1968, they were living in a single wing of Aberuchill Castle which consisted of "23 rooms or so".

His second wife was Faith Clark, and his third was Jane Martineau, also an art historian, whom he married in 1992.

His daughter Allegra, an art teacher, was the first wife of the politician Boris Johnson. His son Orlando is an artist and a painter.
