= Equestrian staircase =

Stairs usable by horses

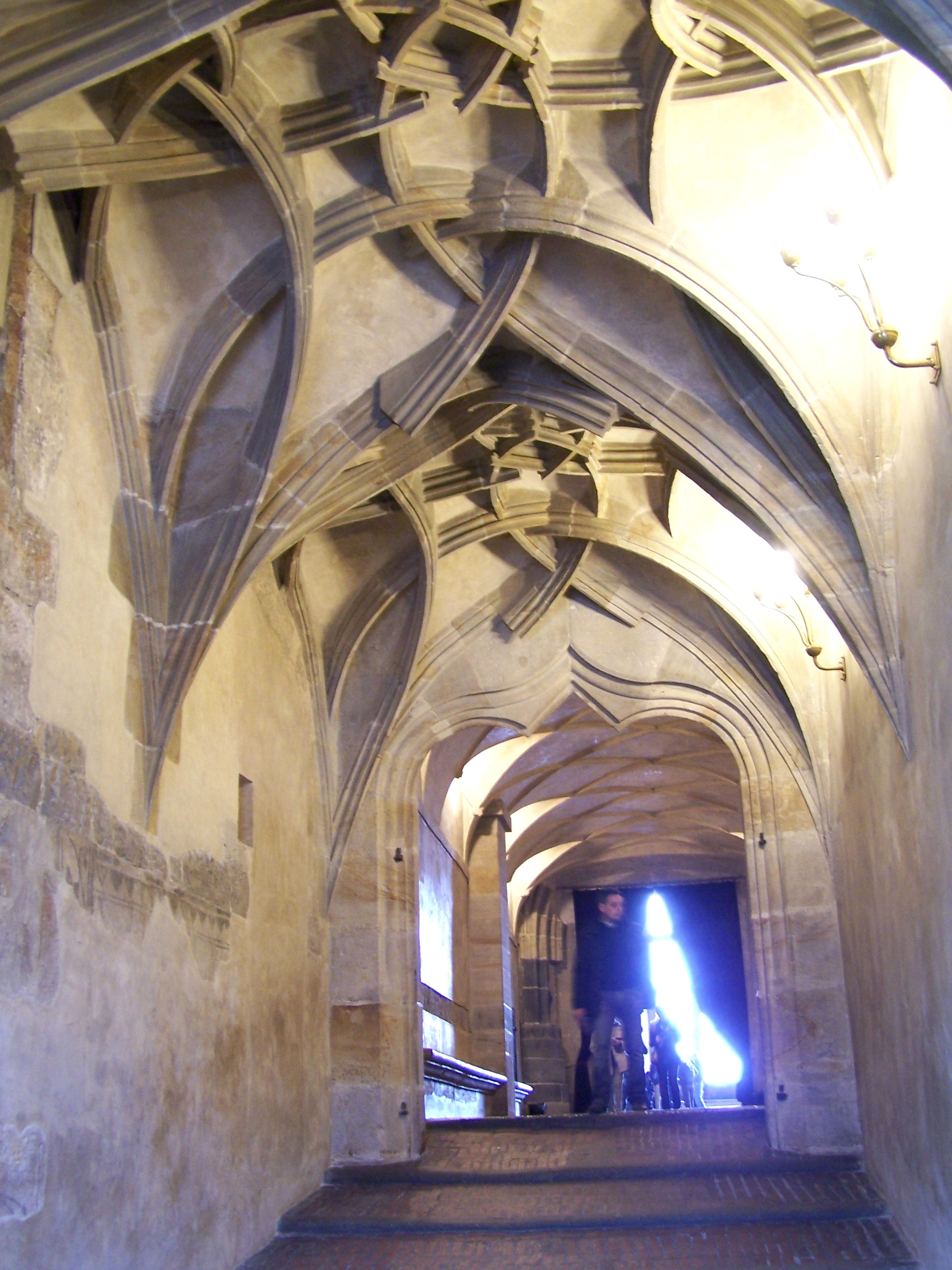
Equestrian staircase in Prague Castle

An equestrian staircase or riders' staircase is a very gently sloping flight of steps that can be negotiated by horses. Its origins may be seen in the mule staircases in steep terrain in open country.

== Use in interior rooms ==
Its design principles found their way from road construction into building architecture. Here an equestrian staircase was a spiral, curved or repeatedly interrupted ramp within buildings, that had a gently sloped and a non-slip floor, either smooth or frequently divided by transverse ridges. This type of ramp occurs in the towers of churches, castles, fortifications and palaces as well as in the architecture of other buildings within fortifications villas and palaces.

=== Representation ===
From the 15th century, imposing equestrian staircases were built in the stately homes of the nobility. These staircases enabled riders to reach the upper floor on horseback. The equestrian staircase leading to Vladislav Hall in Prague Castle, which was built around 1500, is one of the oldest known examples.

Other equestrian staircases are found:

- in the Château d'Amboise, the Tour de Minimes and the Tour Heurtault both have equestrian staircases
- in the Old Palace in Bayreuth
- in the Berliner Stadtschloss (demolished 1950)
- in the Ehrenburg in Brodenbach on the Moselle
- in the Stallhof in Dresden
- in Schloss Riedegg in Gallneukirchen
- in the Landshut town residenz
- in citadel in Spandau
- in the Old Palace in Stuttgart

=== Stepless equestrian ramps ===
Occasionally ramps were built without any actual steps, enabling horses to draw a carriage or wagon up the incline. There are examples in Venice (St Mark's Campanile), Geneva (city hall) and Copenhagen (Round Tower).

== Gallery ==
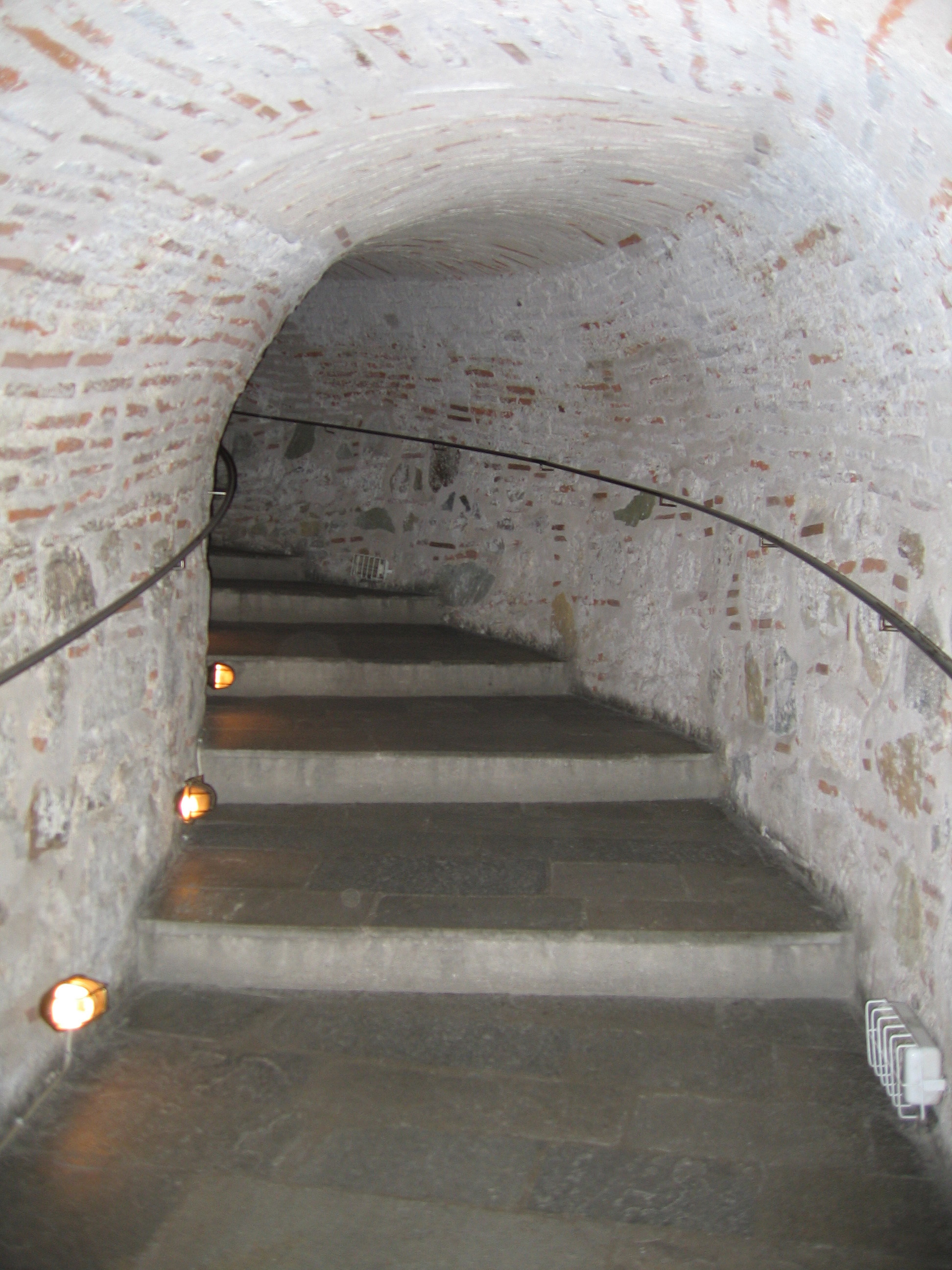
Mule staircase in the White Tower of Thessaloniki

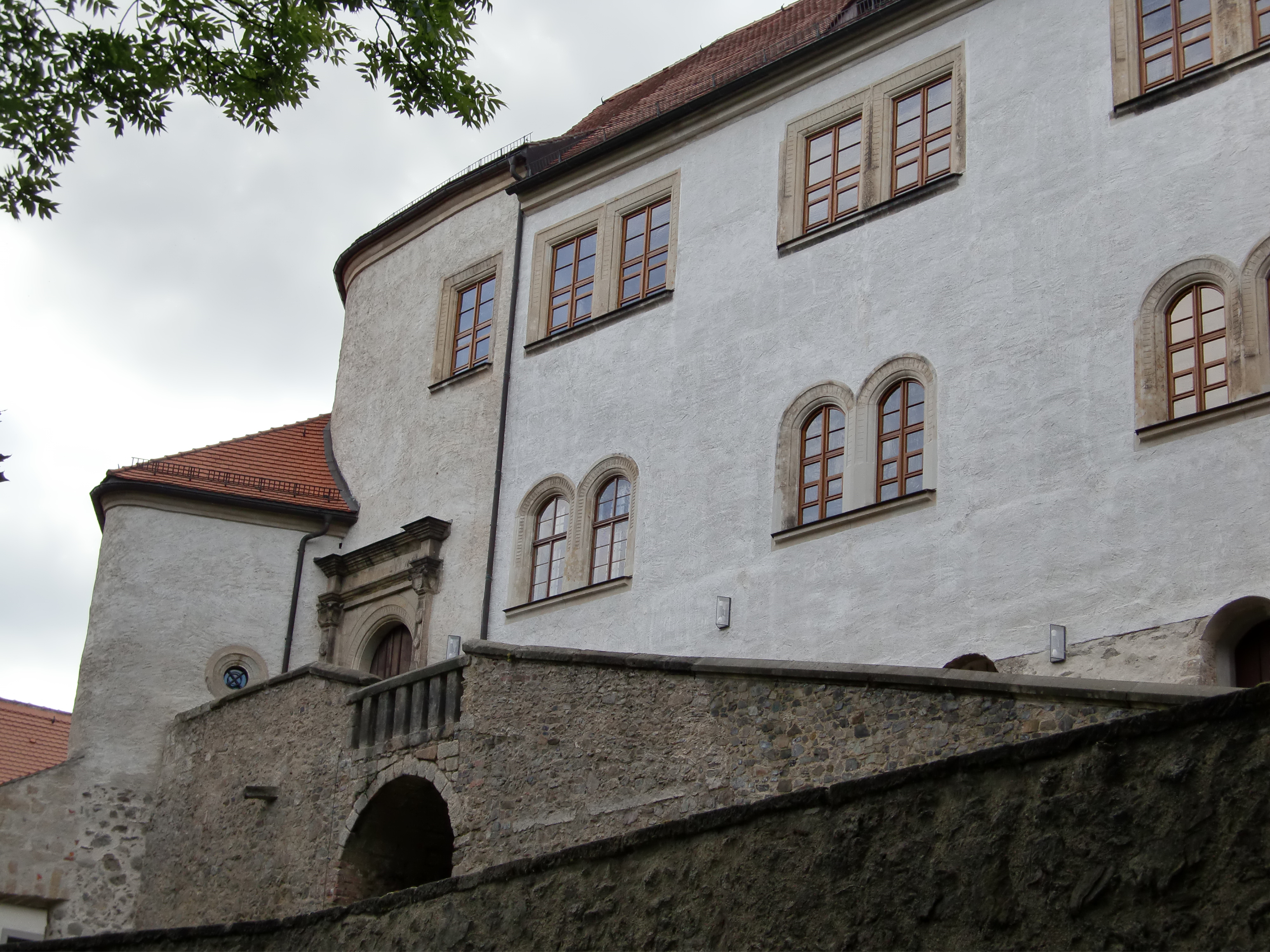
Equestrian staircase outside Schloss Klippenstein, Radeberg

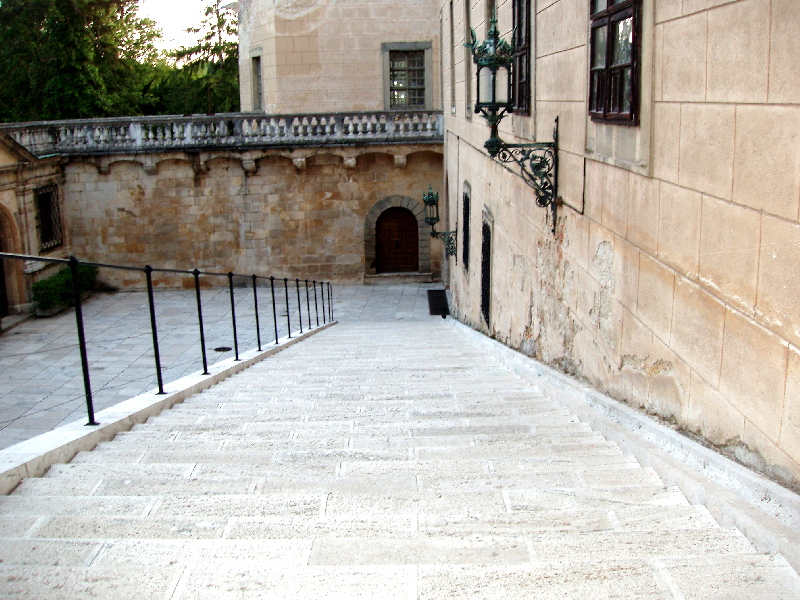
Equestrian staircase outside Bojnice Castle, Slovakia

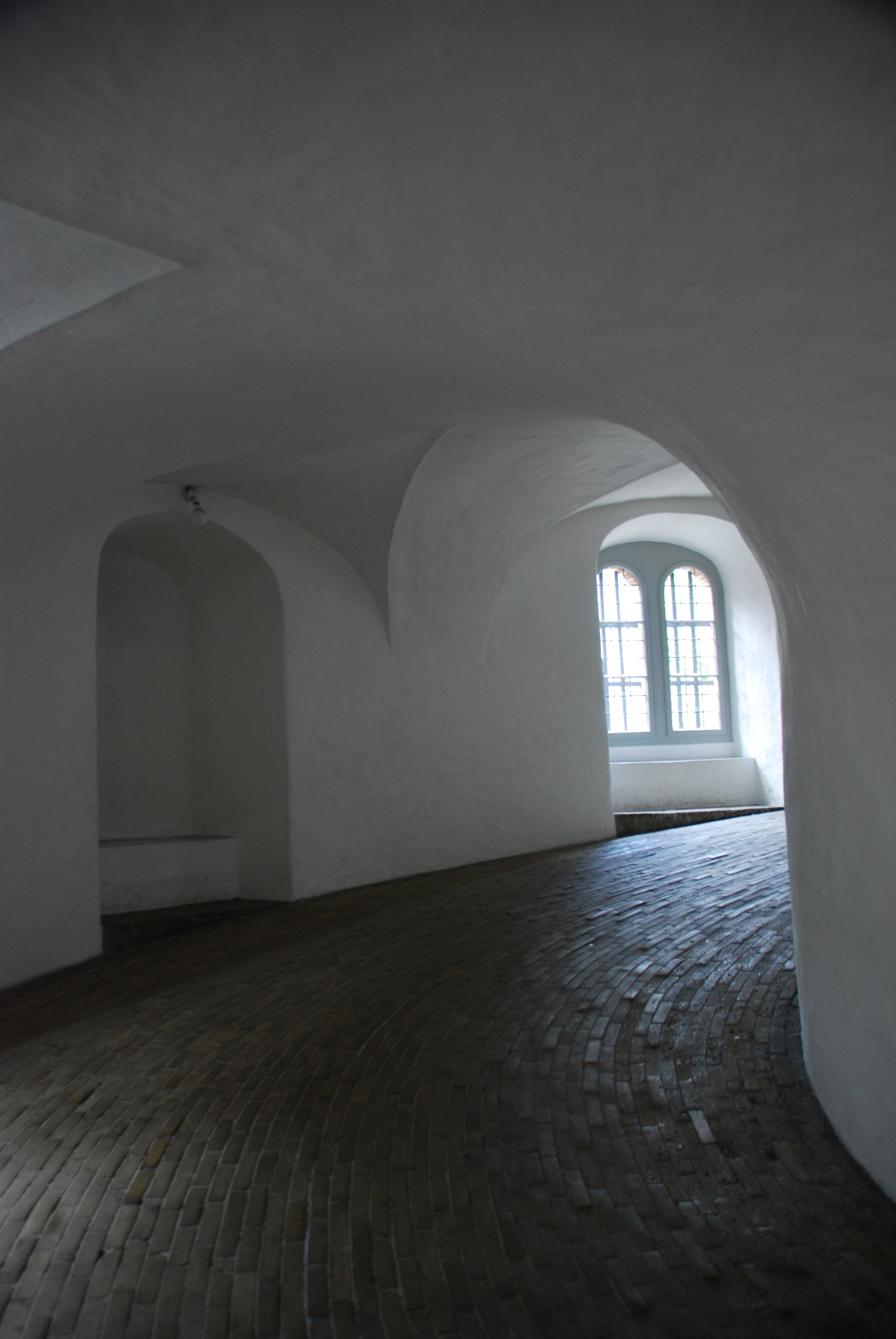
Stepless ramp in the Round Tower in Copenhagen (1642)

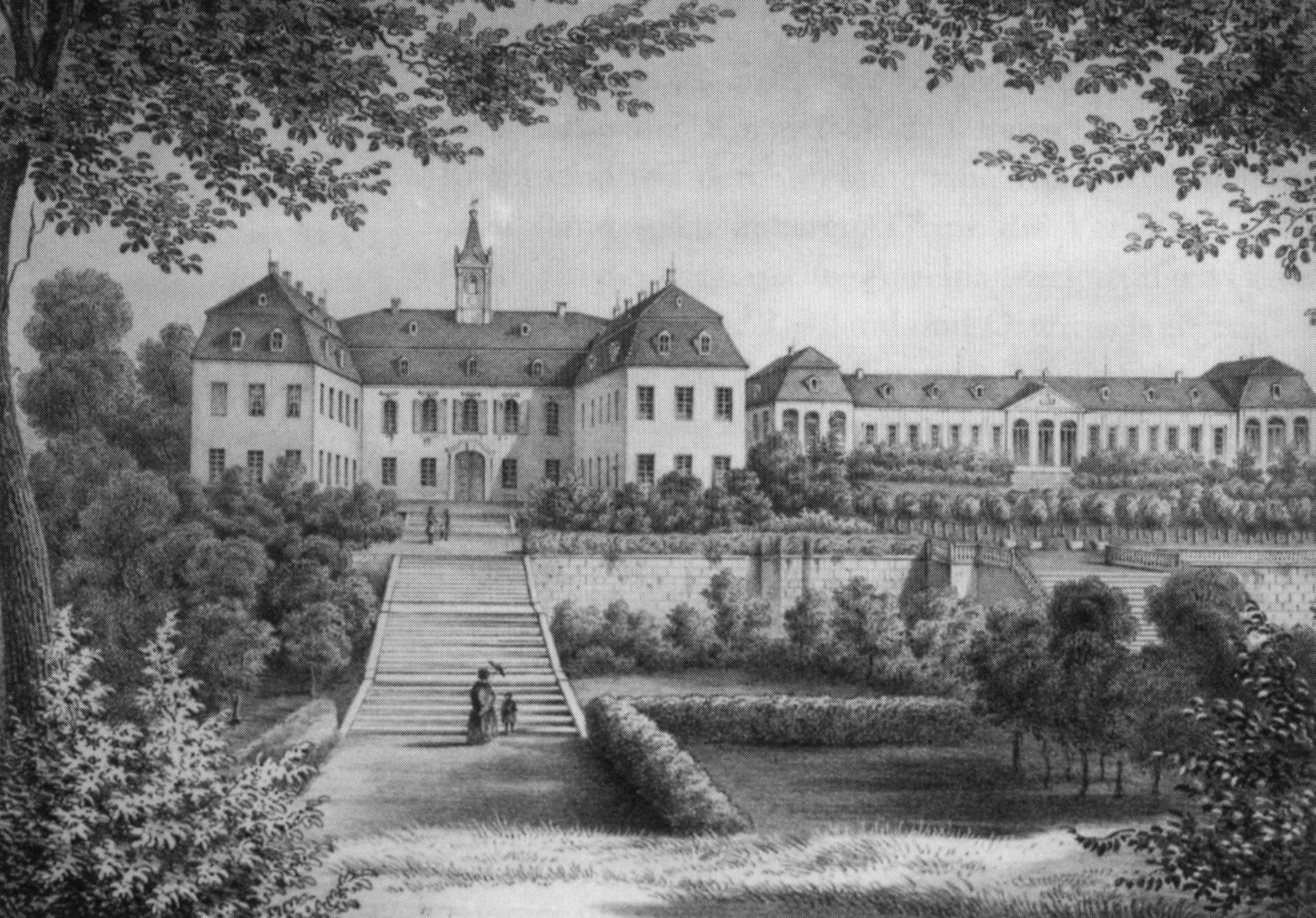
Equestrian staircase as an element of the Großsedlitz Baroque Garden

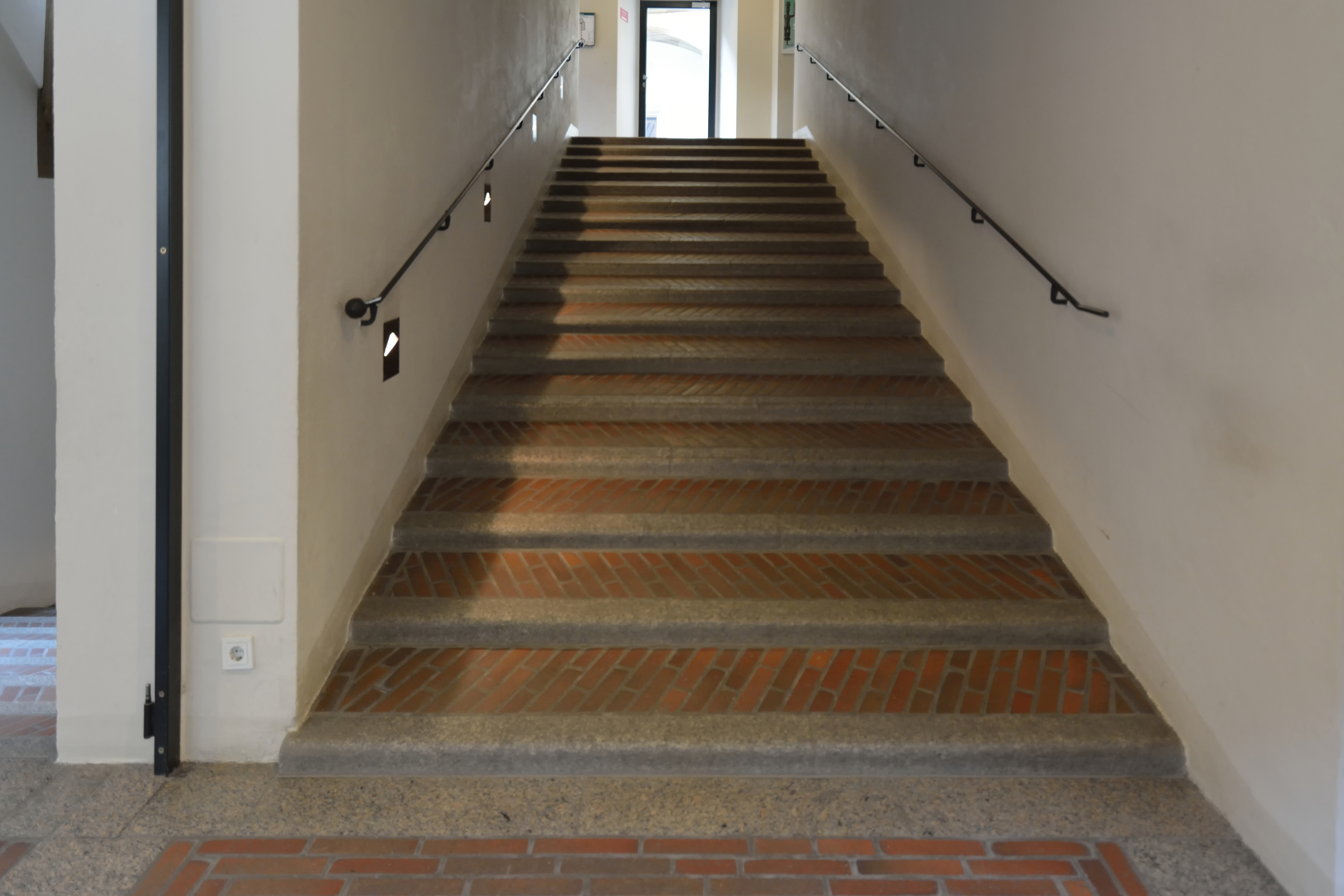
Equestrian staircase in Old Castle (Stuttgart)

== See also ==
- Cordonata
- Mule ramp
