= Bernard Stern =

Bernard Stern (1920–2002) was a British artist and businessman.

Bernard Stern was born in Brussels, Belgium in 1920, the son of an English mother English, and a wealthy Polish-Jewish bullion dealer father who fell into poverty.

He trained at the Académie Royale des Beaux-Arts in Brussels from 1935 to 1937; then at the Royal Academy of Fine Arts, in Antwerp, from 1937 to 1939. He moved to England in 1940, and for a short while in 1942 studied at St Martin's School of Art.
