= Mule ramp =

Gently sloping ramp designed to be used by pack animals

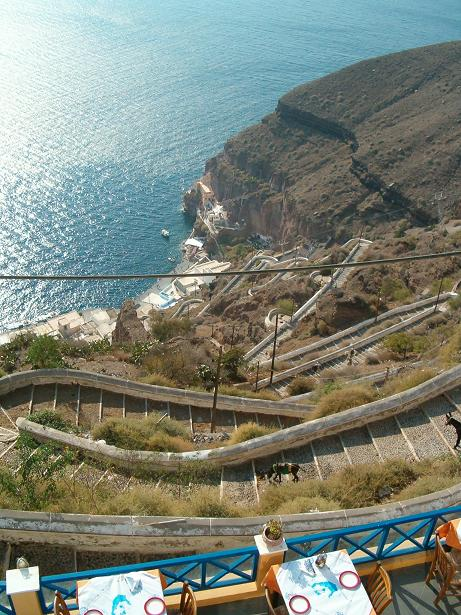
Mule ramp in Fira, Santorini, Greece

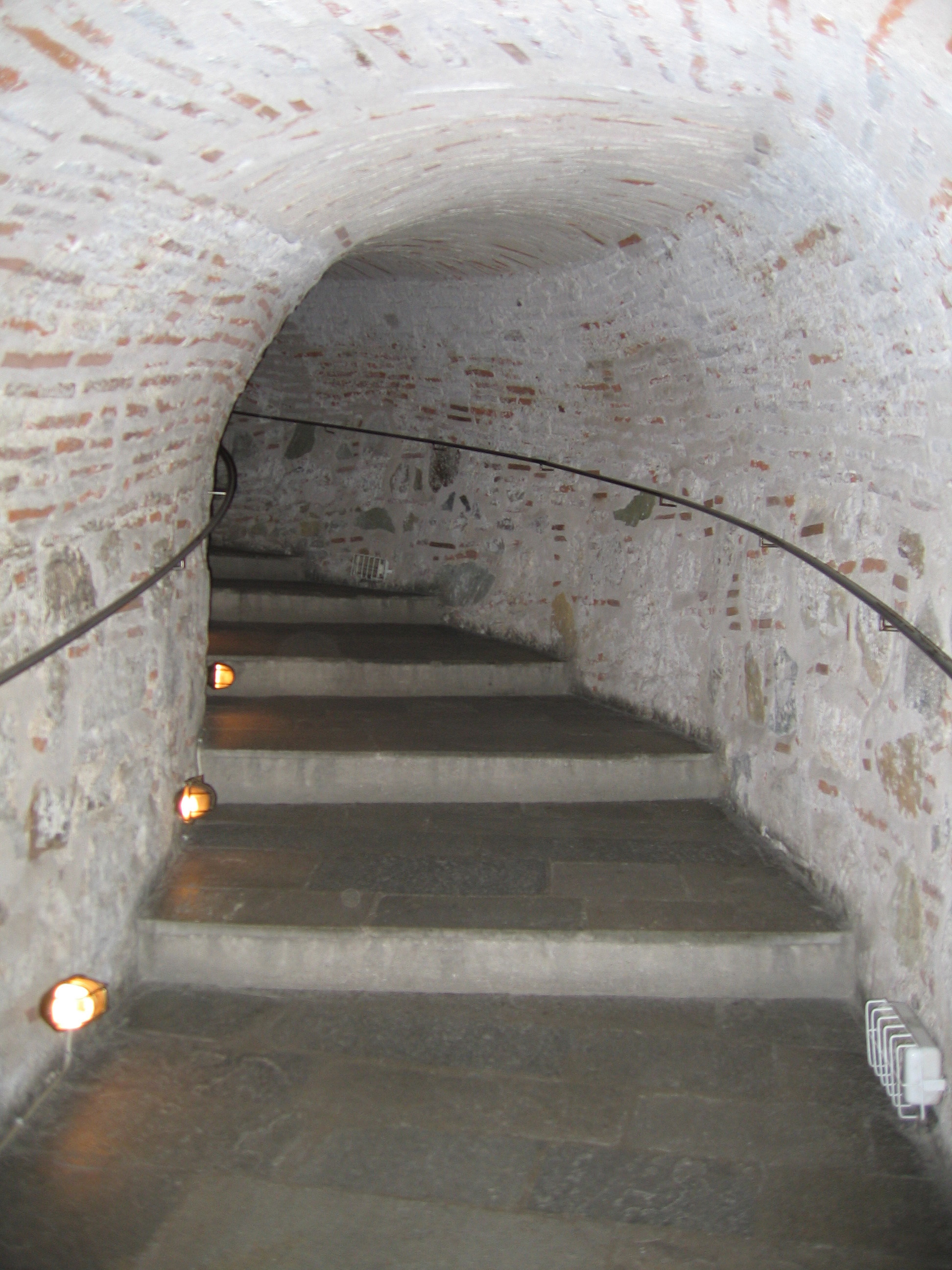
Mule ramp in the White Tower of Thessaloniki, Greece

A mule ramp, or horse ramp, is a very gently sloping ramp that can be negotiated by pack animals. Originally, mule ramps were used in steep terrain in the open countryside. They usually have steps.

== Use indoors ==
From road and track construction the principles of design found their way into building architecture. An interior mule ramp consisted of a spiral, curved or straight ramp within a building that had a gentle incline and non-slip floor. Such ramps may be continuous but more often have transverse steps at large intervals. These are found in churches, castles and other buildings. Later, the very similar equestrian staircases were built as showpieces in palaces, for riders to climb to the upper floors on horseback.

The term mule ramp first appears in specialist literature in the 19th century. The name is probably derived from attempts to explain the name, Mule Tower (Eselsturm), for the northeast tower of Regensburg Cathedral (11th century). This tower had a continuous spiral ramp. The argument that it was specifically designed for pack mules does not bear scrutiny because its dimensions are much too small for such a purpose. On the other hand, neither the term mule ramp nor similar designations are known for ascents of this kind that have been used with certainty by pack and draught animals.

== See also ==
- Cordonata
- Equestrian staircase
- Spiral staircase

== Literature ==
- Beyer, Roswitha (1968). "Eselstreppe". Reallexikon zur Deutschen Kunstgeschichte. Vol. 6. pp. 21–22.
