= Allegra Mostyn-Owen =

British journalist and teacher

- Born: 1964 (age 61–62); Islington, London, England
- Education: Trinity College, Oxford; Université libre de Bruxelles
- Occupations: Journalist; teacher
- Spouses: Boris Johnson (1987–1993) Abdul Majid (m. 2010)
- Parents: William Mostyn-Owen (father); Gaia Servadio (mother)

Allegra Mostyn-Owen is a British journalist and teacher. She was the first wife of former British Prime Minister Boris Johnson.

Mostyn-Owen was born in London to art historian and Christie's Education chairman William Mostyn-Owen and Italian writer Gaia Servadio. She was raised by her parents alongside her two brothers, Orlando and Owen. During her time as an undergraduate student at Trinity College, Oxford, she worked as a journalist and met Johnson. Mostyn-Owen and Johnson married in 1987, divorcing in 1993. She remarried in 2010.

== Education and career ==
From 1983, Mostyn-Owen read Philosophy, Politics and Economics at Trinity College, Oxford. Students often spoke of her as one of Oxford's most beautiful women. Subsequent modelling assignments included being photographed by David Bailey for the cover of Tatler magazine and by Terence Donovan for Vogue. She was on the books of the Models1 modelling agency in London.

Her career in journalism began when she became the joint student editor of Oxford's Isis magazine in 1985.

After graduating, Mostyn-Owen began working for the Evening Standard. She worked on the paper's gossip column "Londoner's Diary" resigning the following April. She gained a master's degree in EU Law from the Université libre de Bruxelles.

After divorce from Johnson, Mostyn-Owen embarked on a career teaching Muslim women English and art at the Minhaj-UI-Quran Mosque in East London. Shortly after, she persuaded mosque elders to let her start art classes for boys and girls aged five to 14. In 2010, Mostyn-Owen spoke at a public event on "the Closing of the Muslim Mind" (the title of a book by Robert R. Reilly published that year) and the audience was reportedly gripped by her "creative and kindly" personality.

She creates ceramics in her studio in West London. She developed her ceramics through adult education in Hammersmith and Fulham and one-to-one tuition from Seth Cardew at Wenford Bridge.

== Relationship with Boris Johnson ==
Mostyn-Owen met Boris Johnson in their first year at Oxford University. The pair were often described as the "perfect couple" at university, being identified as "the girl from the cover of Tatler" and he was "the future prime minister".

They were married on 5 September 1987, at St Michael and All Angels, West Felton in Shropshire. A piece written for the occasion by composer Hans Werner Henze was performed. The reception was held at the Mostyn-Owens' country estate, Woodhouse.

The couple divorced in 1993, with Mostyn-Owen citing Johnson's frequent absences and preoccupation with his work: "The really bad times were when he didn't tell me he was going to be away."

Johnson later recruited Mostyn-Owen as part of his Muslim Engagement Taskforce when he was seeking re-election as Mayor of London. In an interview with the Evening Standard, Mostyn-Owen claimed "he's a better ex than he was a husband".

== Second marriage ==
Since marrying her second husband, who is from Pakistan, Mostyn-Owen explained, "I'm happy now, very happy", and that she found it "very rewarding to have this whole connection with Pakistan." Mostyn-Owen remains Christian and has "never been tempted to convert to Islam herself".
