= Neisse Tower (Görlitz) =

Fortified tower in Görlitz, Germany

- Neißeturm
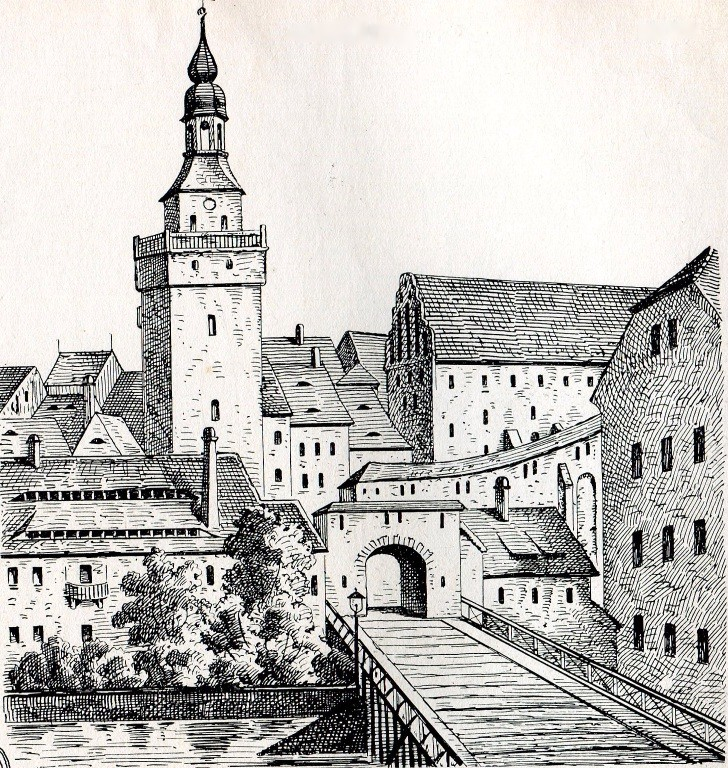
- Drawing of the Neisse Tower and tower fortification from eastern side of the Lusatian Neisse. In the background one can spot the Woad House.
- Interactive map of the Neisse Tower area

General information
- Type: Fortified tower
- Coordinates: 51.1574°N 14.9926°E
- Completed: first mentioned in 1315, reconstructed in 1415, 1525 and 1737
- Demolished: 1836

The Neisse Tower (German: Neißeturm, pronounced [naɪ̯sətʊɐ̯m]) first mentioned in 1315 was part of the historic fortification of Görlitz until its demolition in 1836. It was located next to the bridge over the Lusatian Neisse close to the historic old town, which led to the now polish city Zgorzelec. With the other fortified towers Thick Tower, the Reichenbach Tower and Nikolai Tower, Görlitz had four large watch- and defense towers.

== History ==
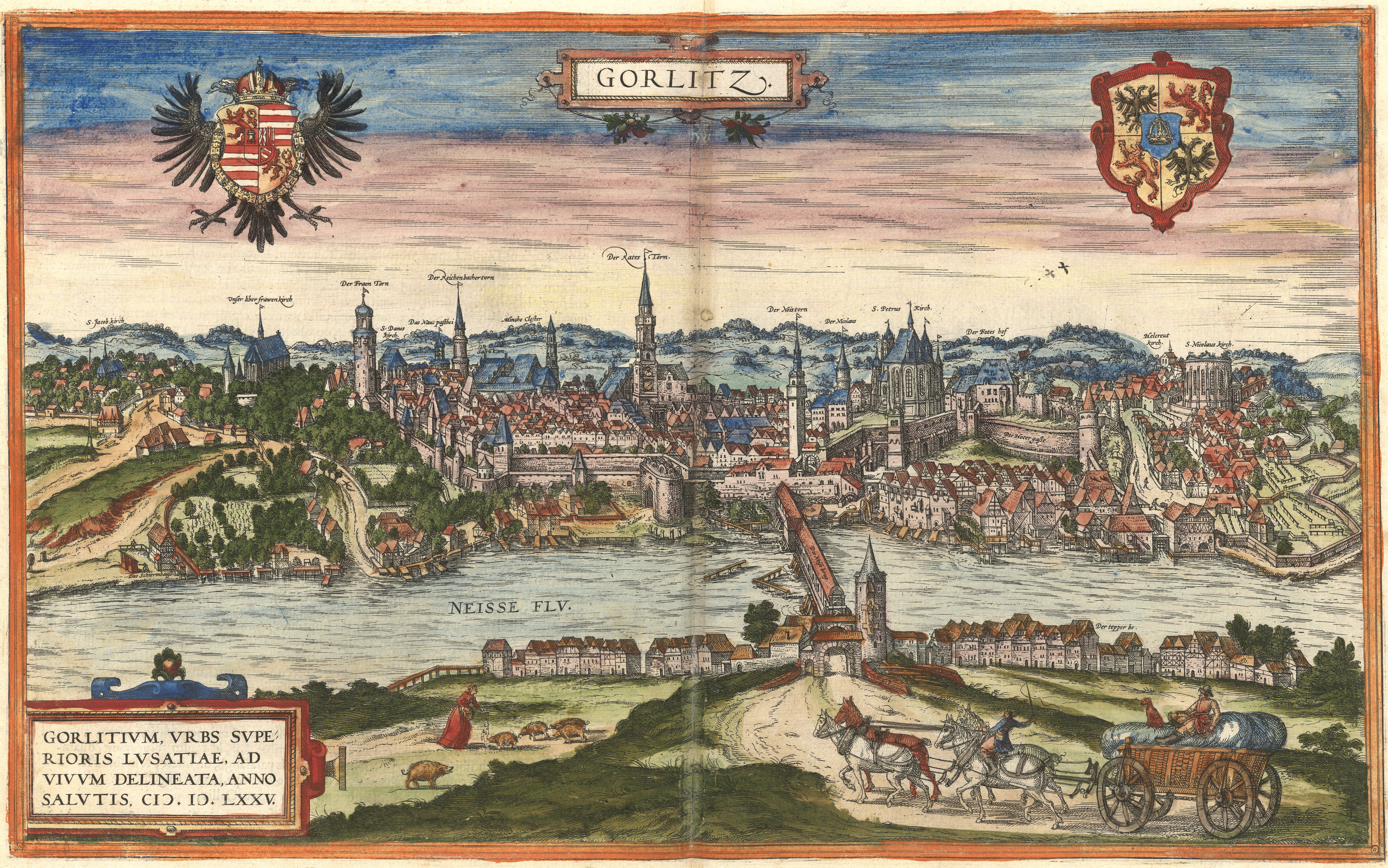
Görlitz in 1575. The tower can be seen right behind the bridge.

The Neisse Tower was first mentioned in 1315 but dates back very likely to the city foundation in the 12th century. Originally made out of wood, the tower was built entirely out of stone in 1415 to increase the fortification, until it burned down on 12 June 1525, and was reconstructed in 1539 with four small Renaissance wall dormers, a walkabout and a sharp pointed roof. On the city portrait from 1575 the new constructed tower is visible.

On 30 April 1726, the tower burned out completely. The new building, begun in 1737 under the master carpenter Georg Hamann, master mason Samuel Suckert, coppersmith Andreas Heinecke and goldsmith Müller, was built in a simple Baroque style. The new building cost 1350 thalers. Since the tower greatly hindered the increasing traffic, it was demolished in 1836.

The tower leaned south against the inner gate. The outer gate stood directly on the Lusatian Neisse, so that the river ran past the foundation walls. The city gate was too low for high chariots and that is why they regularly got stuck in it. The only way to free them was to tear out the pavement. Mayor Gottlob Ludwig Demiani lobbied the Prussian government for demolition. For a long time he was not granted the permission, until the following incident occurred. A deputy of the Prussian government was Demiani's guest because of this very matter. As chance would have it, on that very day another carriage got stuck in the gate. Both of them hurried towards the gate when they received this news. Stuck in the gate was a heavily loaded wool cart. The government relented after this incident and had the city remove the gate. There were rumors that this incident was a set-up and Demiani had ordered the chariot, but this was never proven. In 1841 the structure was demolished and in 1857 the side pillars. Also the tower on the other side of the river, the Spitalturm, was demolished to make room for the growing city.
