= Upper Market Square (Görlitz) =

Square in Görlitz, Germany

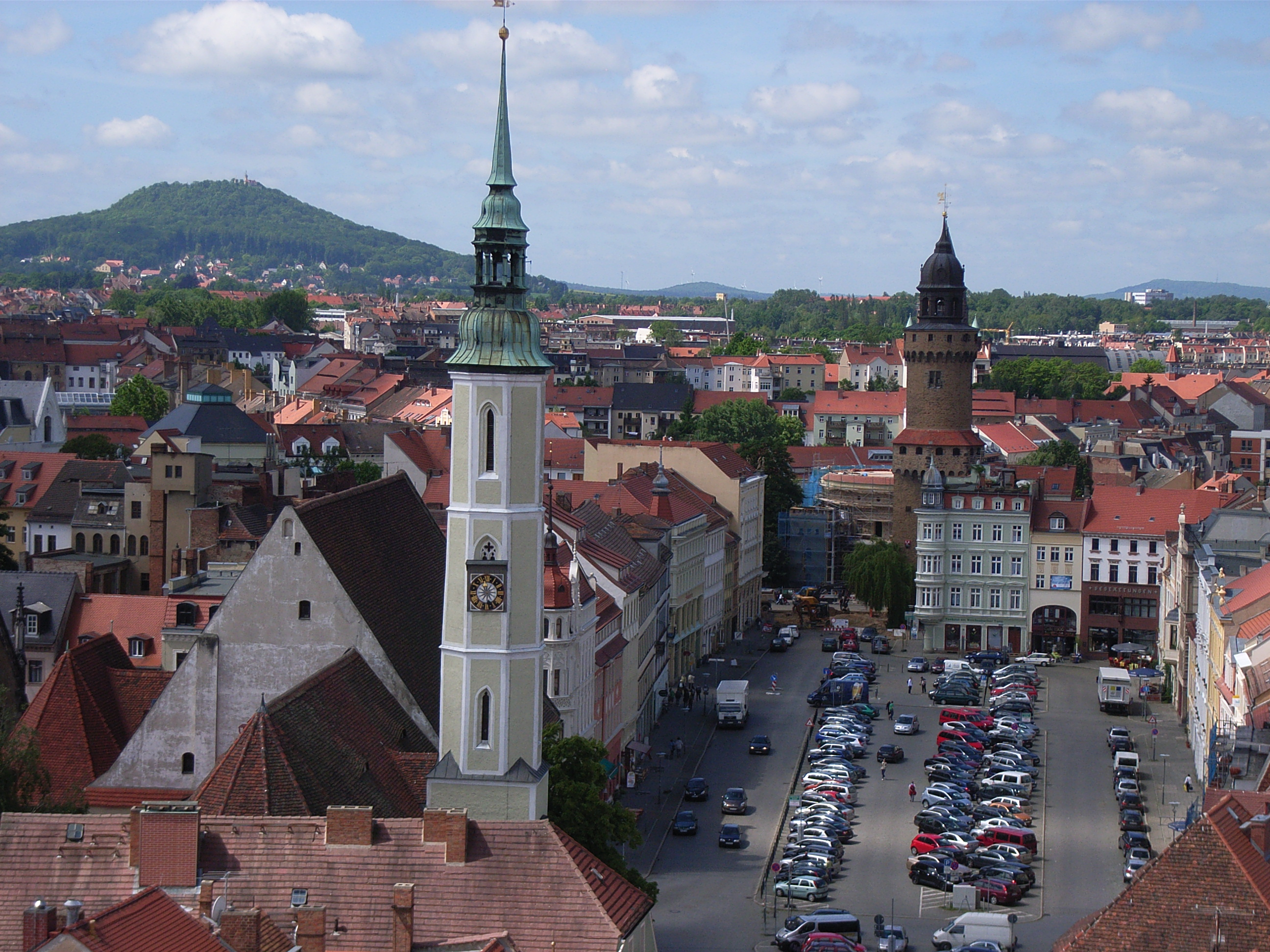
- View of the Upper Market from the Town Hall Tower in western direction. One can spot the tower of the Holy Trinity Church and the Reichenbach Tower.
- Interactive map of Upper Market Square
- Native name: Obermarkt (German)
- Location: Historic Town, Görlitz, Germany
- Coordinates: 51.1552521316465°N 14.987242198632025°E
- North: Breite Straße, Fleischerstraße, Verrätergasse
- East: Demianiplatz
- South: Steinstraße, Klosterplatz
- West: Brüderstraße, Langenstraße

Construction
- Construction start: c. 1250

Other
- Known for: Baroque-styled buildings, Dreifaltigkeitskirche, Reichenbach Tower
- Website: www.visit-goerlitz.com/Tourismus.html

The Upper Market Square (Upper Sorbian: Wyše torhošćo) in Görlitz is the largest square in the historic part of the town. It was laid out in 1250 together with the Lower Market Square. Both are connected via the Bretheren Street (Brüderstraße). While the Lower Market is mostly bordered by Renaissance buildings, the Upper Market has many buildings from the Baroque and Wilhelminian periods. It is therefore the gateway to the historic part of the town. Important buildings on the market include Reichenbach Tower, Kaisertrutz and Holy Trinity Church (Dreifaltigkeitskirche).

== History ==
=== Expansion in 13th century ===
The Upper Market was laid out around 1250. The square and the adjoining alleys formed the Neustadt (New town) in the 14th century. In 1401 the names Neumarkt (New Market) for the eastern part and Oberneumarkt (Upper New Market) for the western part appeared for the first time. However, by 1848 at latest, when the expansion of the city began, the name Obermarkt (Upper Market) became established. As part of the expansion, today's Wilhelmsplatz was also created, which bore the name Neumarkt (New Market) until it was renamed in 1871.

=== Early Modern Period ===
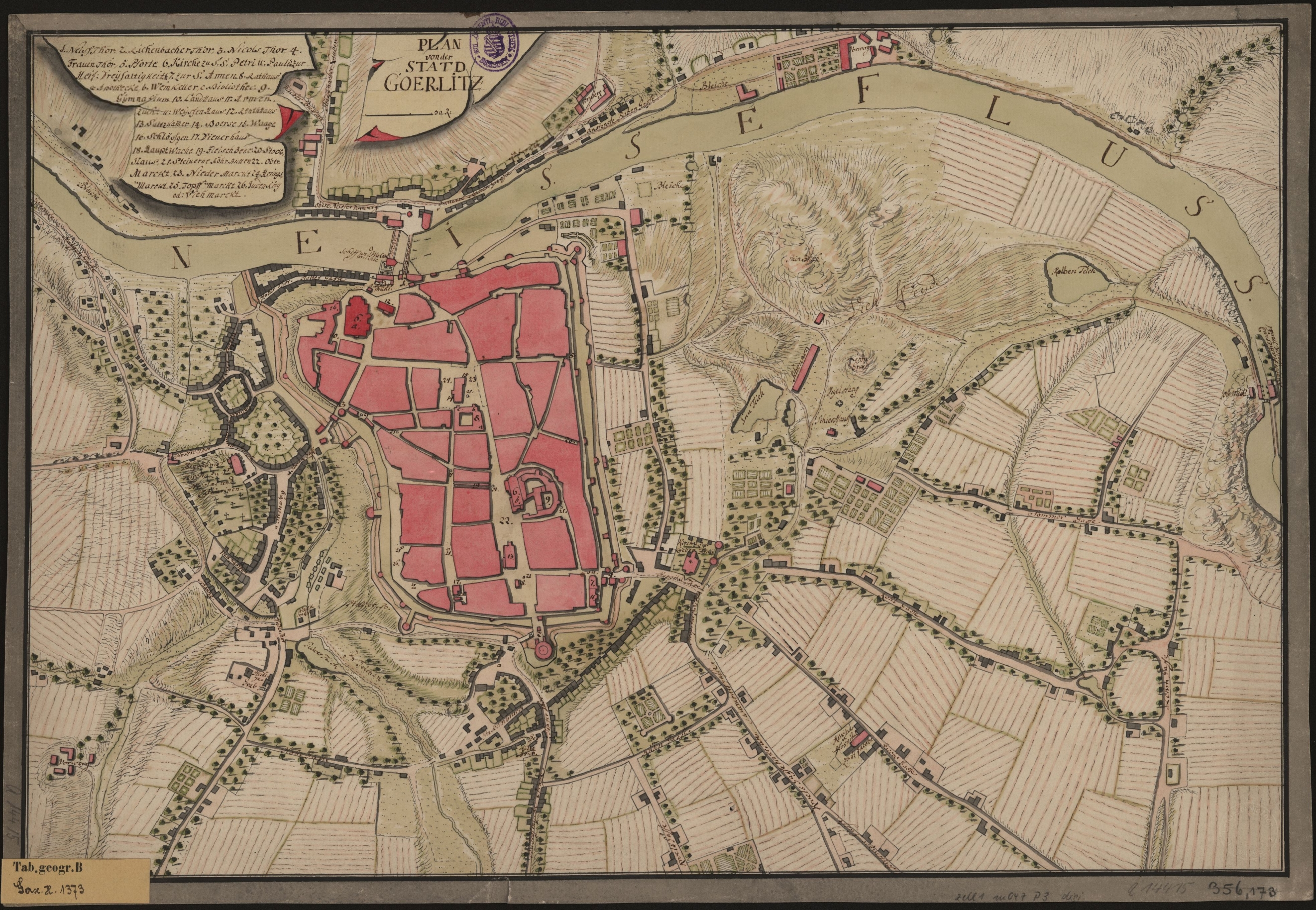
Map of the town in 1750; Nr. 22 is the Upper Market.

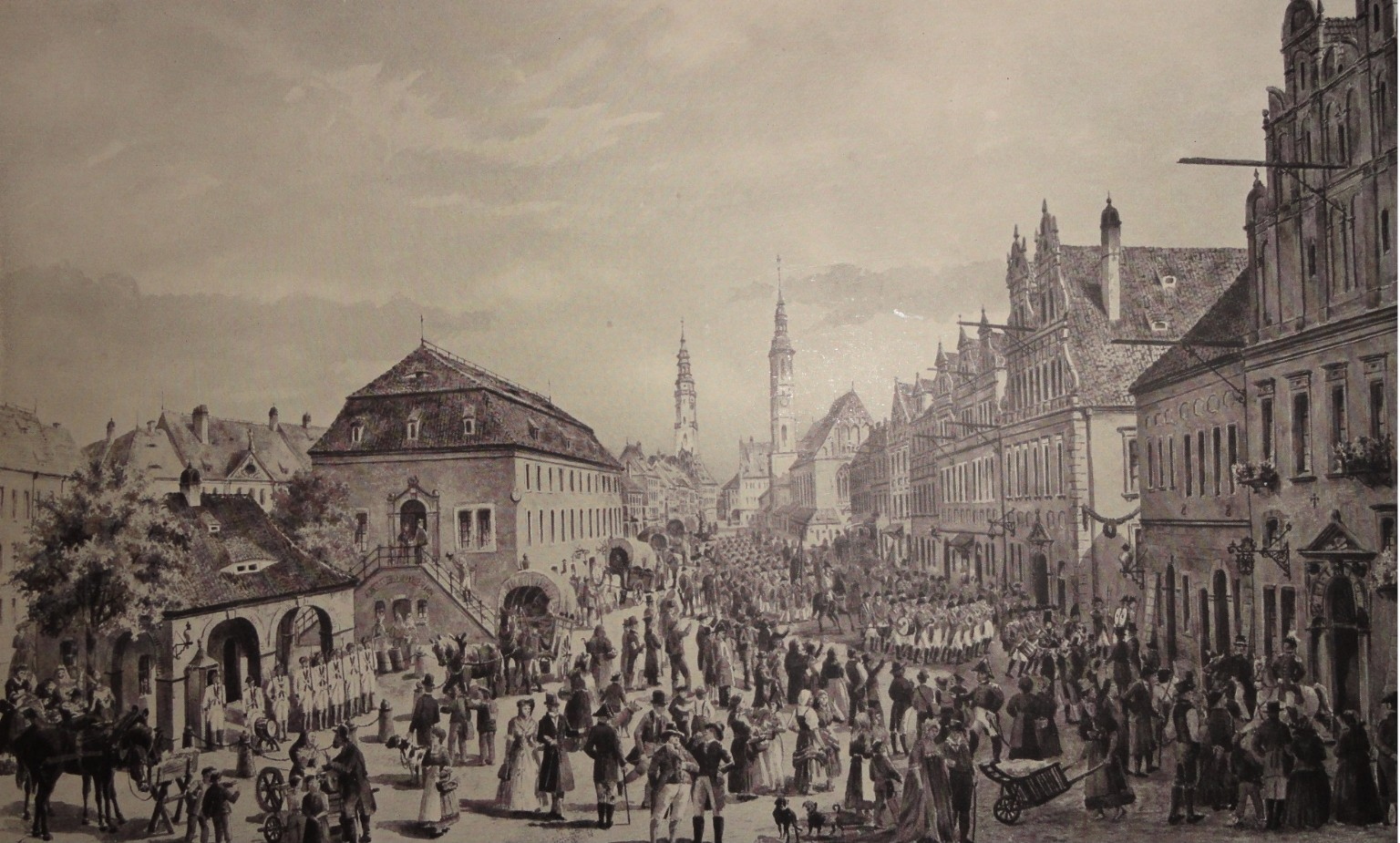
Upper Market Square with the salthouse in 1792, Deployment of the marksmen's guild for Whitsun shooting

According to chronicles, the salt house was built in 1407, but the first mentions of it were only around 1424 and 1434. It stood in the middle of the square and started at about the level of the junction of Steinstraße (Stone Street) and then extended further in the direction of Bretheren Street (Brüderstraße).

In January 1451, a pulpit was erected in front of the salthouse for the Franciscan friar and preacher John of Capistrano. He preached 15 sermons there. The Franciscans owned a monastery in Görlitz on today's Klosterplatz from the 13th century until its dissolution as a result of the Reformation; their monastery church was the Holy Trinity Church on the Upper Market Square.

In 1535/36, the salt house was converted into a dance hall, merchant's and garment house, as until then there had only been a dance hall for the higher society in the town hall. Until 1767 it had high, pointed gables on each side, which were removed and replaced by a hipped roof. On the west and east sides, a staircase led to the second floor. A baroque portal granted entrance to the interior. There were stone measures on the house, the old grain measure Scheffel and the Viertel. In the large upper hall, local and foreign clothiers offered their goods for sale. Salt was stored on the first floor until about 1815, when it was moved to the Woad house. The salthouse housed military goods on the second floor. The Markthut (market hat) indicated that only local non-traders were currently allowed to shop in the salthouse as long as it hung outside of the building. Until the year 1851, the salt house was used, then it was demolished.

In 1717 a large townfire destroyed all buildings on the northern and western side Therefore, the oldest civil buildings on the square date back to 1717.

The upper market was mainly used for grain trade. By 1700, the influx of goods was so great that the space was barely enough. On July 19, 1804, 754 carts full of grain crowded the market.

=== Prussian Era ===
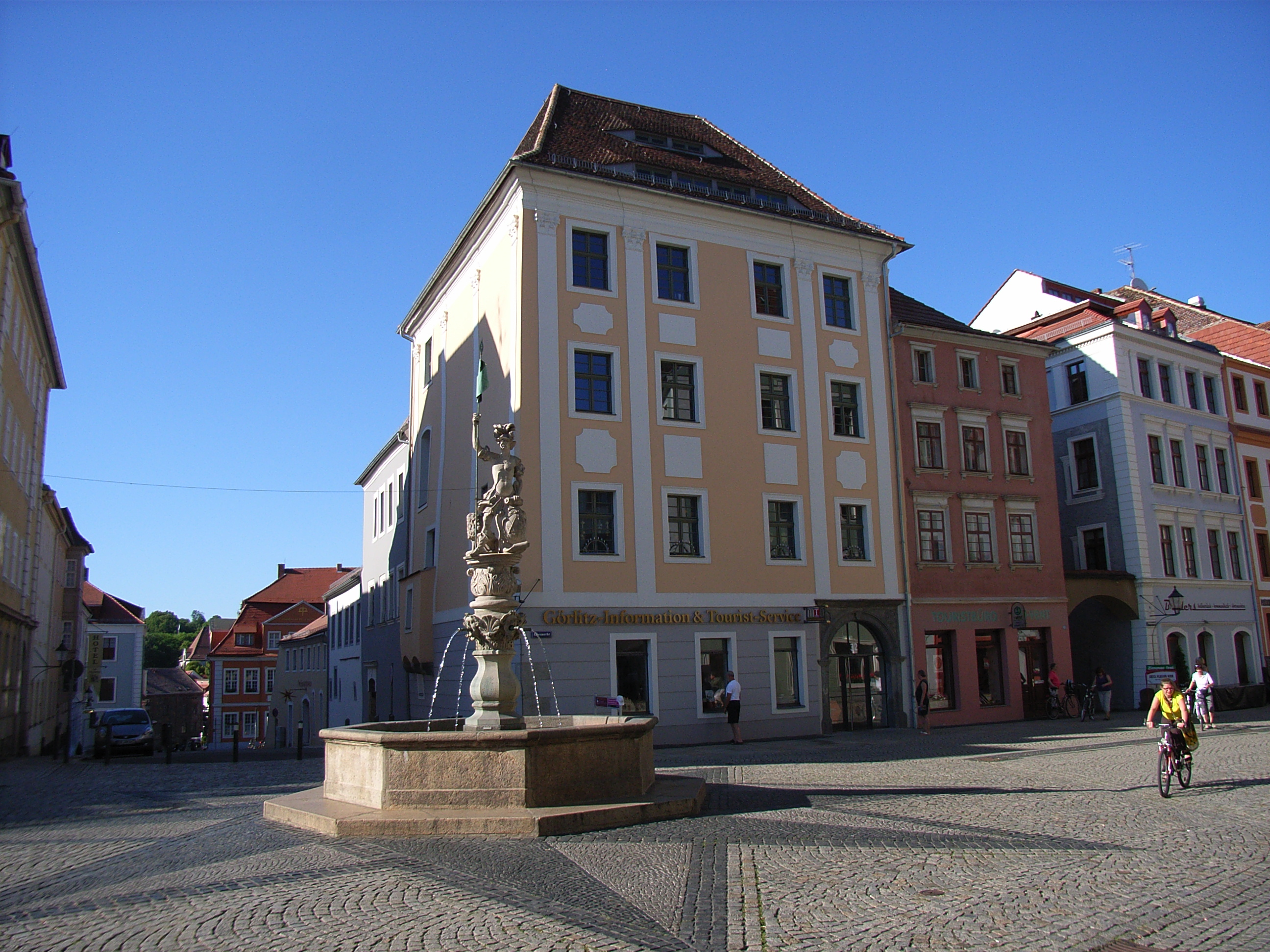
George's fountain and view into Fleischerstraße

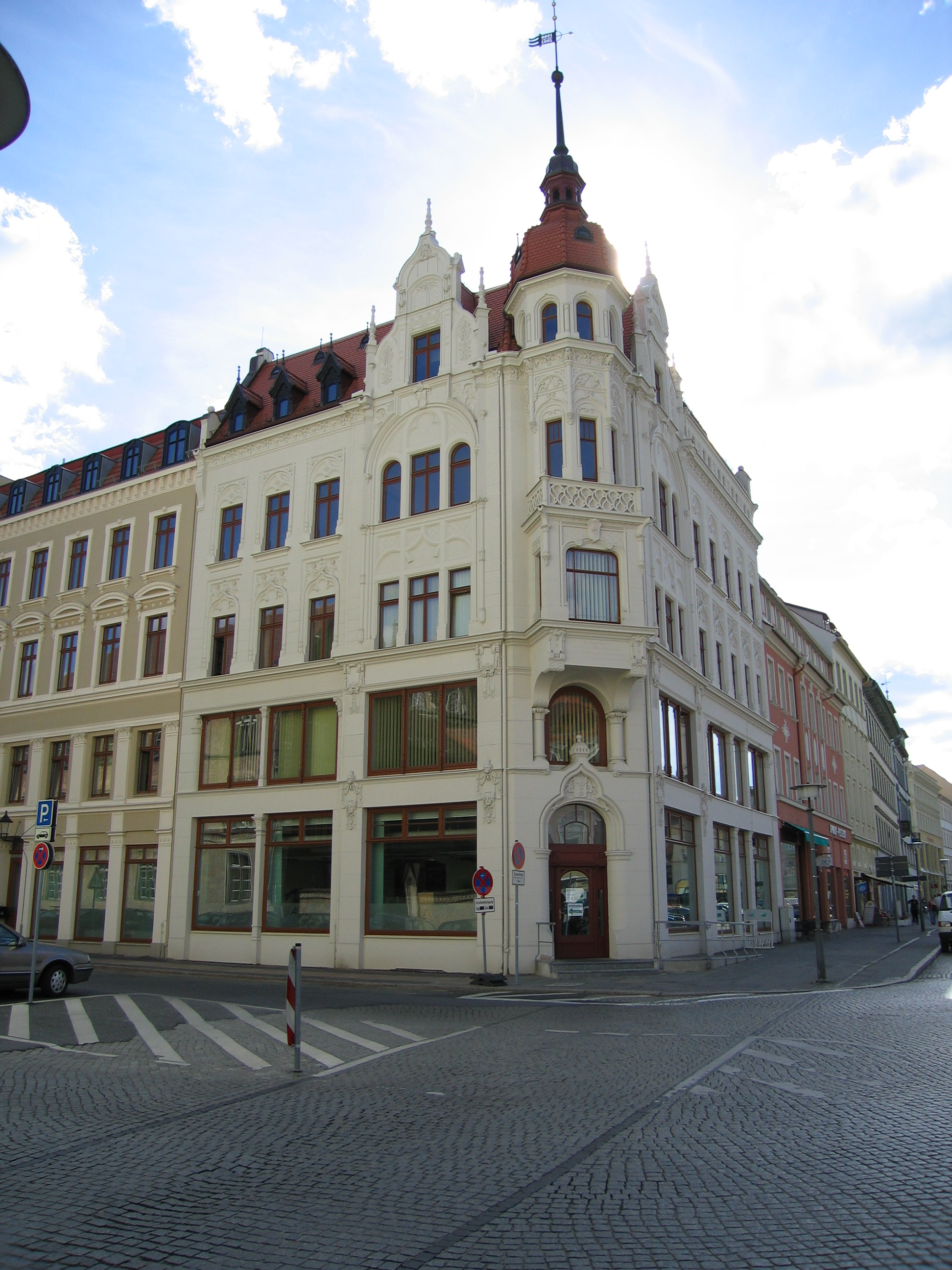
A building erected in 1900 in the corner Obermarkt/Klosterplatz

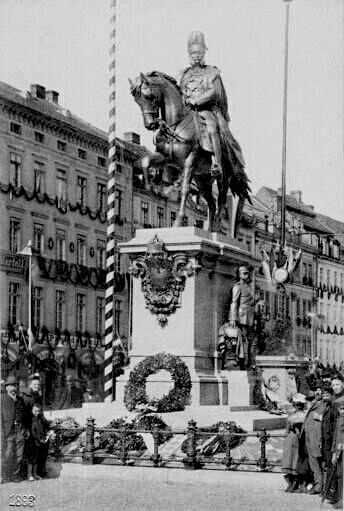
Dedication of an equestrian statue showing German Emperor Wilhelm I

After the treaties of the Congress of Vienna, eastern Upper Lusatia changed from the Saxonian to the Prussian state and thus also the city of Görlitz. The inflow and outflow of goods from western and southern Upper Lusatia or to these areas was severely impeded by the border between Prussia and Saxony that had now been created. Only with the introduction of the customs union on 1 January 1834 the situation improved again clearly. On the market there were again traders like knitters, stocking sellers, beaders, Bohemian farmers with wooden boards, residents of Rothwasser with their shingles, ladders, brooms and numerous other products. However, the craft recovered only briefly, until it then declined sharply due to the greatly changing economic conditions around 1870.

To the west of the salthouse stood the main guardhouse from 1676 to 1847. It was extended in 1704 and 1740. From 1640 to 1650 the guard was located north of the monastery church. With the expansion of the Kaisertrutz by the Prussians, the main guard and the military arsenal moved from the salthouse to the Kaisertrutz in 1850.

George's fountain, dating from 1590, was placed in front of the Goldener Adler (Golden Eagle) until 1856, after which it was moved in front of the Schwibbogen. The shield of George with the Electoral Saxonian coat of arms probably previously bore the Bohemian coat of arms. The statue on the Upper Market Square is now a copy. The original is located in the Upper Lusatian Library of Sciences at Neissstraße 30. It is not sure whether the fountain figure represents Saint George or a Görlitz city servant.

On the south side of the square, which was largely spared from fires, numerous buildings from the 16th century remained until the 19th century, but for the most part in a ruinous condition. Exemplary described is the change of the houses between Klosterplatz and today's Steinstraße:

The cloth-maker Max Finster was at the same time the owner of the corner house Upper Market Square/Klosterplatz (at that time House No.1), built in 1722 by saddler Michael Ulrich in the Baroque style. In 1898 he additionally acquired the neighboring house No.2 and demolished both buildings. On the enlarged property he erected a new building in 1900. Today, the corner house houses the office of a health insurance company. Also in 1804, the double house Upper Market Square No.3 was demolished by the salt administrator Christian Friedrich Görcke and replaced by a wider new building. A third floor was added to the baroque appearing house No.4, but it remained otherwise unchanged. House No.5, then also known as the von Mollerstein-Zimmermannsche Haus had three large street gables with volutes and two gothic gates until shortly after 1800. In 1803, the gables were first demolished and replaced with a shingle roof. In 1837, Riemermeister Immanuel Friedrich Zimmermann completely rebuilt the house. Only the von Mollerstein coat of arms remained. The corner house Upper Market Square/Steinstraße (No.6) was also a baroque building crowned with two large gables. It was built in this form around 1680. This house lost its gables in 1803 and was rebuilt from scratch in 1844 by the master furrier Ernst Friedrich Thorer.

It was similar with the houses in the direction of Kaisertrutz. Two personalities were connected with those: Hans Karl von Winterfeldt wounded in the Battle of Moys, died in the night from September 7 to 8, 1757 in the house No.11. In the house No.8, the saddler Johann Christoph Lüders opened his first carriage building business in 1830. He moved his business to Brunnenstraße in 1849. He is considered the founding father of the Görlitz wagon construction.

Emperor Wilhelm II visited Görlitz for the first time on May 18, 1893, and unveiled the equestrian statue of Wilhelm I on the Upper Market Square. It was located in the approximate center of the square. On May 11, 1939, the monument with its three figures was moved to the Wilhelmsplatz. During World War II it was melted down for war purposes.

=== Begin of 20th century and Weimar Republic ===
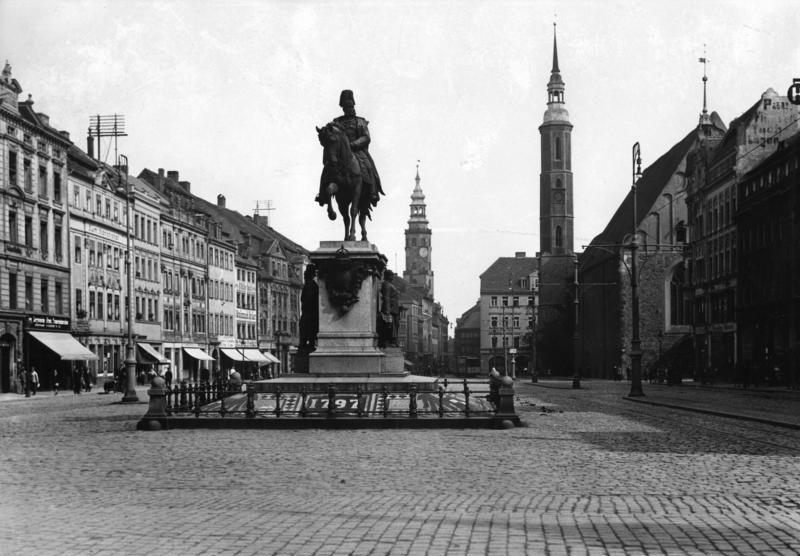
Upper Market Square with the equestrian statue of Wilhelm I in c. 1930

In 1909/10, the Holy Trinity Church was renovated; the artist Adolf Quensen from Braunschweig provided the walls and vaults with romanticizing paintings. The ceiling and wall decorations were replaced with new paintings, which are now considered worthy of preservation as evidence of the national and religious understanding of the time.

With the beginning of the First World War in 1914, the regular parades of the Görlitz garrison troops on the Upper Market Square ended. The soldiers marched through the city to the train station under the cheers of the population. On November 9, 1918, at 6 pm., a large crowd gathered in front of the Kaisertrutz, the main guardhouse at that time. They liberated the military prisoners from the guardhouse without the duty officers being able to prevent it. At the end of the day, the red flag was hoisted on the Kaisertrutz. The day after at 1 p.m. the Reichstag representative Paul Taubadel (SDP, for Görlitz-Lubań since 1912 in the Reichstag) spoke to numerous people on the Upper Market Square. Von Bähr (USPD) and soldier Krüger were also among the speakers. On May 1, 1919, thousands of people celebrated the first May parade after the end of the Empire. In the Golden Twenties the house No.24 offered a new home to the new Volkskabarett zum Mönch (public revue). The audience was entertained with sideswipes at boorish inflation winners and the prudish regimentation of swimwear. The audience probably found the sharper political satire inappropriate. More popular were languorous tango singers and discreet ribaldry. The highlight of these years was the Oberlausitzer Festwoche (Upper Lusatian Festival Week) from July 3 to 10, 1927. The parade with more than 70 floats, including military clubs, post office, fire department, craftsmen's groups, a beer wagon of the Landskron brewery, gymnasts and athletes as well as floats of the automobile club was admired by thousands of citizens. On the stage on the Upper Market Square every evening from 8:30 p.m. the athletes and gymnasts offered performances. Also a music corps of the Reichswehr from the III. Battalion of the 8th Infantry Regiment under Heinrich Junghans played and reminded of earlier military parades on the square. Another highlight was the colorful illumination of the Reichenbach Tower and the Kaisertrutz in the evening.

In September 1928, during his visit to Görlitz, Reichspräsident Paul von Hindenburg also came to the Upper Market Square. He was greeted by the residents with the old black-red-white imperial flag of the German Empire. Only on the public buildings the black-red-gold flag of the Weimar Republic was hoisted up. A few years later with Hitler's seizure of power, the Reich flags finally disappeared in the attics of local residents, where they were rediscovered a few decades later.

=== National Socialism and World War II ===
On the square after Adolf Hitler's seizure of control on January 30, 1933, more and more swastika flags hoisted from windows of private apartments and stores. With the reintroduction of compulsory military service in 1935, the Görlitz Reichswehr Battalion became the Infantry Regiment 30 Görlitz-Lubań; the Holy Trinity Church served as the Protestant garrison church. From June 24 to 27, 1937, the "Anticominternzug" with the Nazi propaganda traveling exhibition World Enemy No. 1 - Bolshevism appeared on the square. Not only the left political wing suffered under the Nazi rule, but also the Jews of Görlitz. On the Upper Market Square, this affected numerous retailers who had to sell their shops far below value or close down as part of the Aryanization. Thus, Otto Klau took over the men's clothing store of Jakob Abramowitz (House No.11), Paul Rother took over the men's and women's clothing store of Richard Dresel (House No.3), Fritz Behrendt took over the shoe store of Paul Kafka (Upper Market corner Steinstraße) and the company Bahr und Söhne took over the men's and women's wardrobe store of the Meirowsky brothers (House No.7).

Artur Dresel's men's clothing store (House No.6) closed. Artur Dresel was a prominent and committed Social Democrat who had held numerous honorary municipal offices. He was accused of sexually harassing a teenage customer during a fitting. The Oberlausitzer Tagespost (Upper Lusatian Daily) and Der Stürmer overflowed with insinuations and fabrications, all of which collapsed after a trial that ended with an acquittal for Dresel and an embarrassment for the masterminds. Despite his acquittal, Artur Dresel was sent to the court prison in Breslau, where he allegedly put an end to his own life shortly afterwards. At a 1948 court trial in Bautzen, it came out that a begrudging neighborhood craftsman had denounced Dresel.

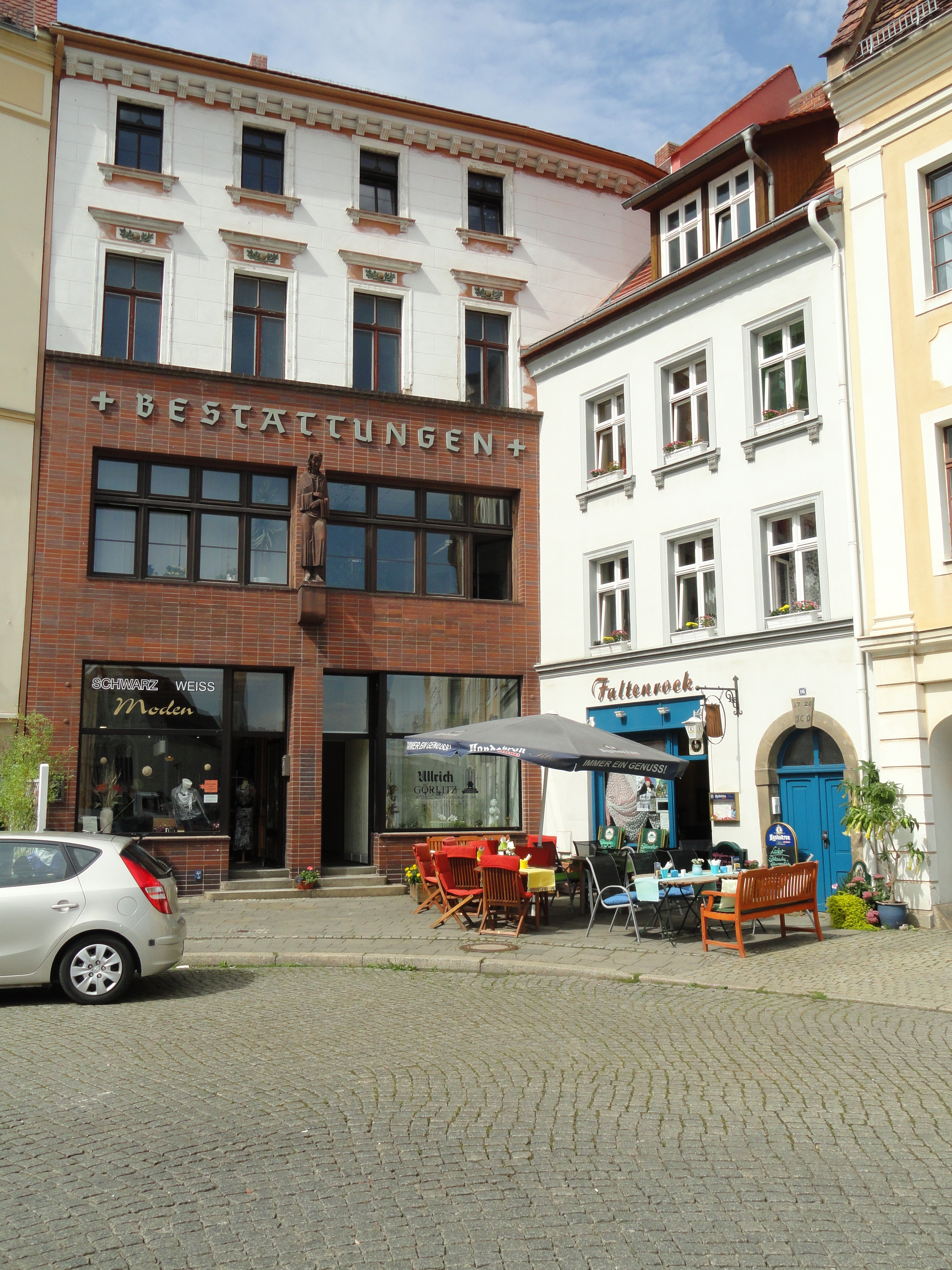
Upper Market Square No. 15

The funeral home Zum Frieden, founded in 1893 by Marie Ullrich (née Opitz) and her husband Oskar Ullrich, was taken over in 1914 by Max Opitz, the son of the founder. In 1936, he had the facade of the company's headquarters at house No.15 redesigned according to the taste of the times by the Görlitz sculptor Heinz Grunwald. He used local handcrafts and local materials and provided the facade with glazed red-brown clinker bricks. He placed a larger-than-life mourning female figure on a ledge at first-floor level between the two entrances to the Ullrich Funeral Home. To the left of the funeral service's shop window, a bronze relief with figures from the local legend of the Night Blacksmith was placed at eye level. The blacksmith of the legend lived and worked in house No.14. The glossy red-brown clinkered facade is an idiosyncratic eye-catcher on the northwest side of the square.

On October 6, 1940, the victory parade of the battalions of the Infantry Regiment 30 stationed in Görlitz took place on the square. They had briefly returned to the Görlitz garrison after the campaigns against Poland and France. Between the Reichenbach Tower and the corner house to Demianiplatz, a gate of honor had been erected with numerous swastika flags. In the following years, windows had to be darkened for air-raid protection reasons, the ration stamps for food and clothing made their way into the lives of citizens, and schoolchildren in uniforms collected for the Winterhilfswerk. Pupils at the school on Klosterplatz were ordered to Dessau and Berlin as flak helpers from the 10th school year onwards, and older pupils were drafted into the Wehrmacht or the Waffen-SS. But there was also resistance to the Nazi regime on Upper Market Square.

In the house No. 15 of Max Opitz, the owner of the funeral parlor Ullrich, former leading Social Democrats were accommodated. Among them were Studienrat Paul Gatter (dismissed from teaching at the Augustum Gymnasium on Klosterplatz in 1933), Hermann Arndt, Fritz Biermann, Dr. Schiller of the Free Religious Congregation, and Wilhelm Baumgart, former chairman of the local SPD association. Under Wilhelm Baumgart's leadership, the members of this group produced leaflets and brought material from occupied Czechoslovakia. Their connections reached as far as Kohlfurt, Lauban, Marklissa, Sprottau, Sagan and Glogau. They supported French prisoners of war and listened to foreign radio broadcasts to get a real impression of the war situation. An advertising company for the weekly newspaper Grüne Post (Green Daily) served as the group's cover. Many others seeking help from the Nazis found their way to House No.15. The Social Democrat Willy Leisten, who belonged to the resistance group, became a victim of Stalinist persecution in the second German dictatorship and ended his life in a Soviet gulag.

The square, like the city, were largely spared from the war. The corner house on Fleischerstraße (House No.31) and its neighboring houses were the only ones destroyed on the Upper Market Square.

=== Postwar years ===
After World War II, Görlitz belonged to the Soviet occupation zone, later to the GDR, which was founded in 1949. On May 1. 1946, up to 10,000 people, including factory workers, students and members of the newly founded parties gathered for a large rally on the Upper Market Square. Some of them carried banners that read "Nie wieder Krieg" (Never again war) or "Frieden - Einheit - Aufbau" (Peace - Unity - Rebuilding). The square was decorated with large red flags for this large mass rally. Contemporary witnesses report that one could see the red flags were already used and in the center were circular dark red fields, which suggests that one had merely removed the Nazi symbols from the old swastika flags.

=== GDR and Reunification ===
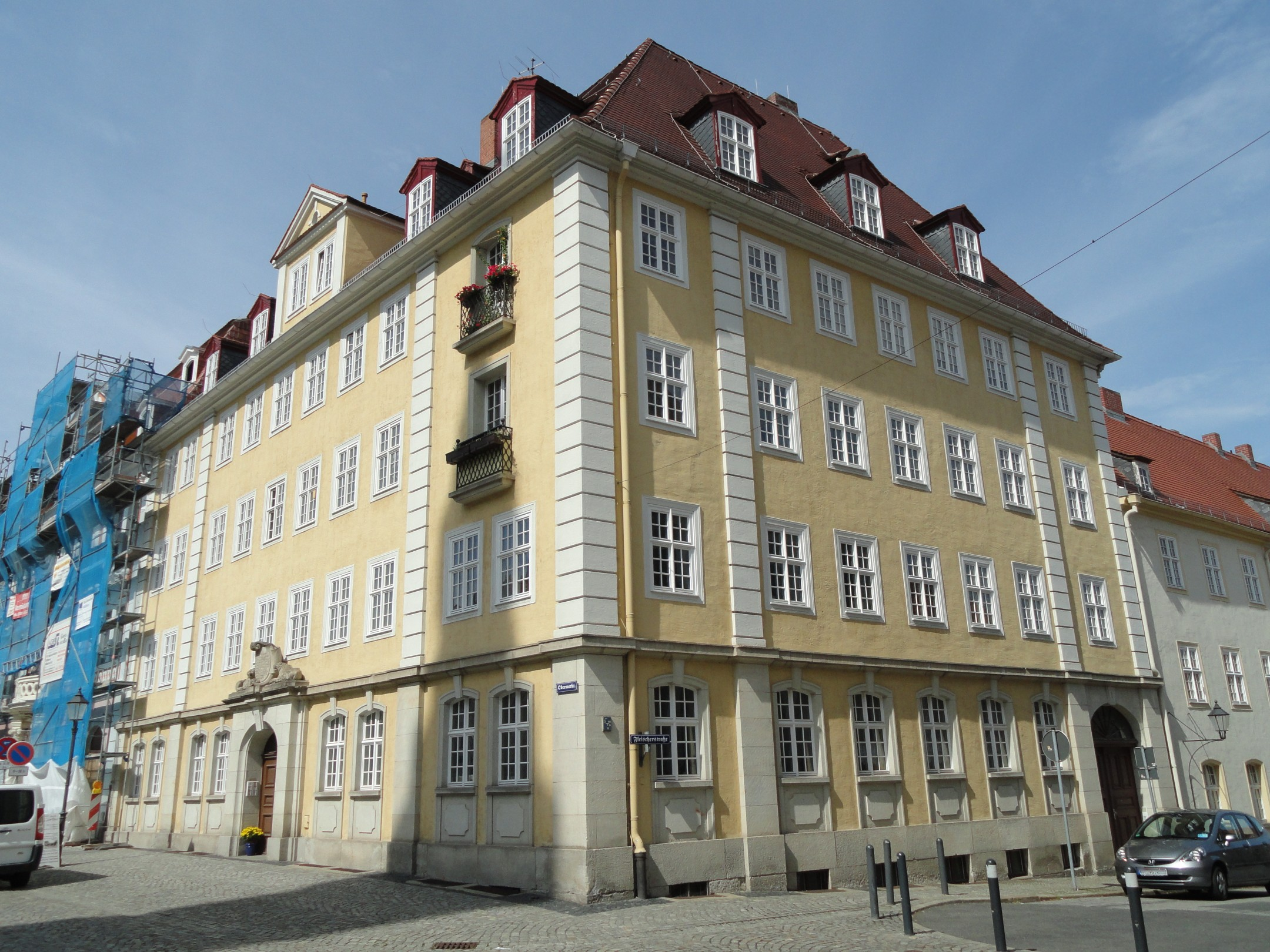
Fleischer street 30, destroyed in war, rebuild in 1953/54

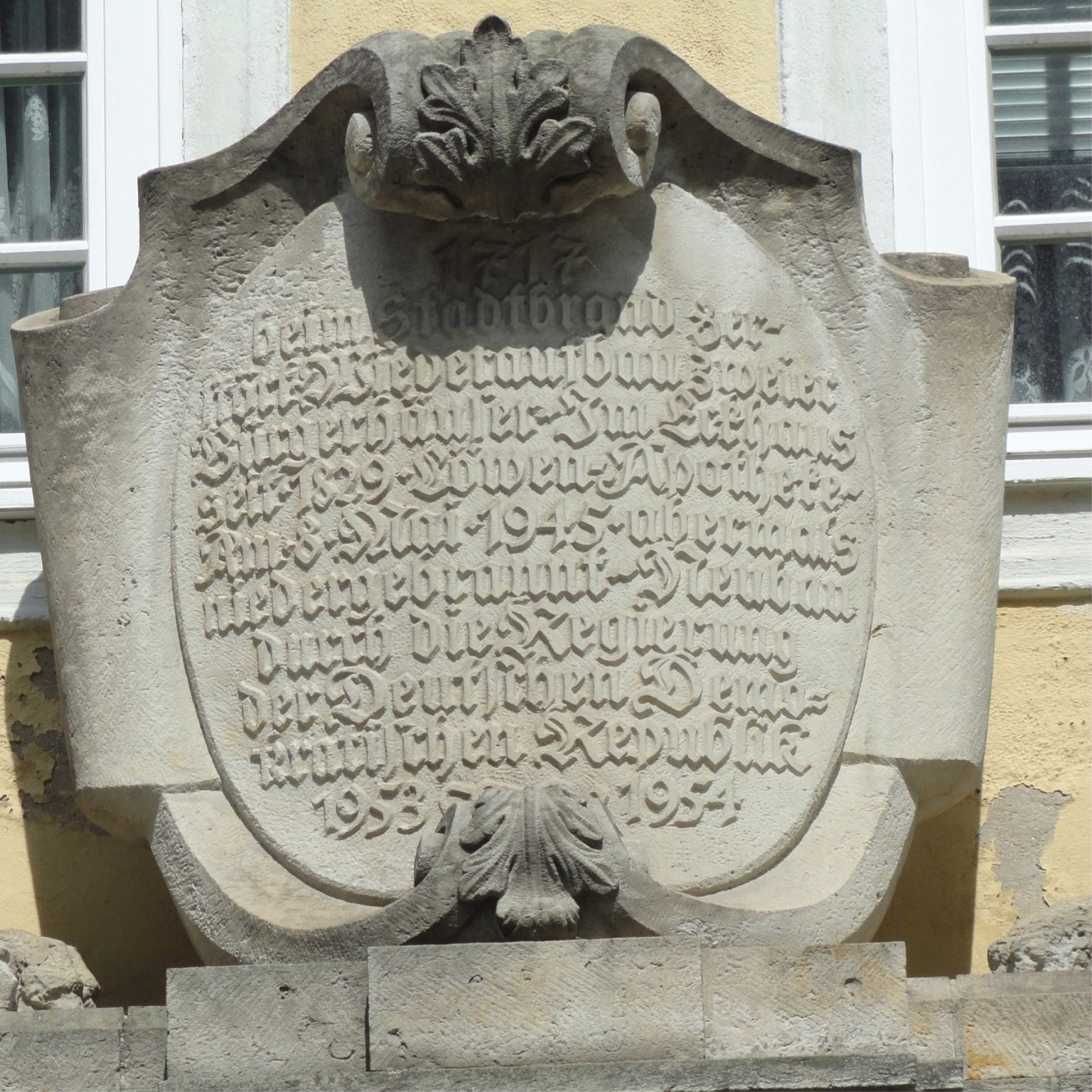
Inscription of the escutcheon above the entrance

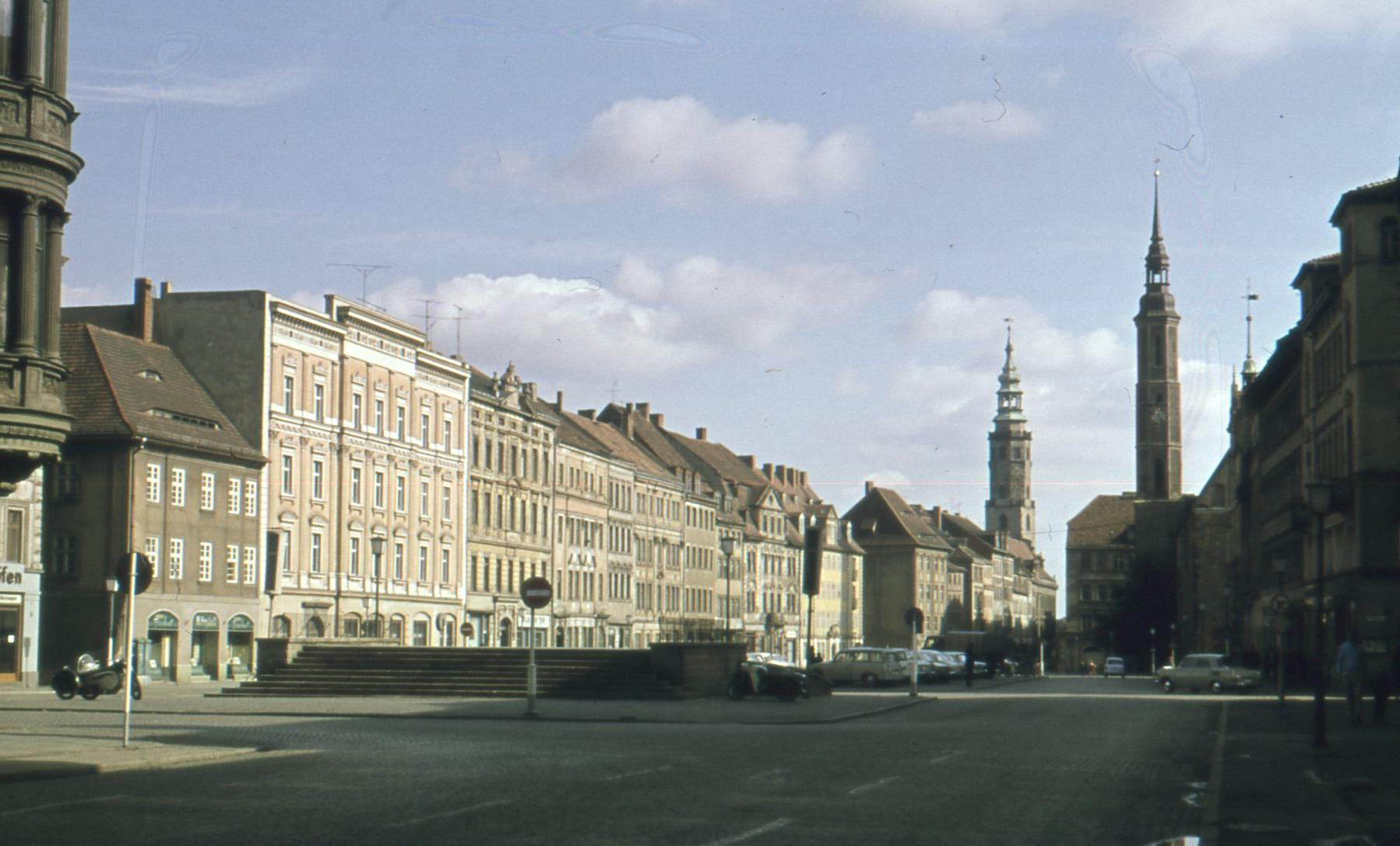
Tribune on the square

In the first post-war years, the Upper Market Square counted more residents than ever before in its history. According to the Görlitz address book 1949/50, it offered a home to 245 tenants (excluding commercial tenants) in 32 houses with mostly three floors. In some houses there were up to 34 tenants (e.g. Upper Market Square 5). Several tenants often shared one apartment. Among the tenants were numerous refugees from Silesia and the eastern suburbs of Görlitz on the other side of the Lusatian Neisse (later Zgorzelec belonging to Poland). From the same address book one can also see that the commercial tenants had largely remained the same, including the bicycle, sewing machine and lighting fixture trade Dürsel, the hardware store Herrmann, sanitary Jüttner, the fur house Scholich, the shoe store Behrendt, the clothing store Bahr, the butcher's store Neumann, the hotel "Weißes Roß", the stove store Kahle, the Resi cabaret, the gold and silverware stores Bauer and Höer, the leather goods store Bartsch and the ice cream parlor Bianchi. A Jewish tenant expelled by the Nazis also returned. The textile shop Abramowitz was reopened at Upper Market Square 11.

The visible war damage also disappeared at the beginning of the 1950s. House No.24 was given a temporary roof and the destroyed houses at Upper Market Square and Fleischer street were replaced by a new building. The new building carefully fits into the overall picture of the square with its baroque, but also modern style elements. Only on closer inspection does the observer discover clues that speak for a new building, e.g. on the basis of the inscription of the coat of arms sign above the entrance. The following is written on the escutcheon: "Destroyed in the town fire in 1717 Reconstruction of two town houses In the corner house since 1829 Löwen-Apotheke (Lions Pharmacy) Burned down again on May 8, 1945 - Rebuilt by the government of the German Democratic Republic in 1953 1954"

On October 11. 1950, shortly before the general election, a head of state spoke to the people of Görlitz once again for a long time. The later President Wilhelm Pieck gave a speech on the square and particularly pointed out the aid measures for industry, schools and new citizens. On the west side of the square, a nine-tiered, stone tribune with a wide standing area was erected in the mid-1950s. However, the grandstand was to stand on the square for only 20 years, after which it was demolished because the May parades were now held on Platz der Befreiung (Site of Liberation) (now Postplatz). However, large events continued to take place on the square, such as the Görlitz Music Weeks in the 1950s, festivals of peace and friendship among nations with German, Polish and Czechoslovak choirs, dance groups and orchestras, as well as numerous sporting events. Especially popular were the international bicycle races, such as the Peace Race. Here, for example, Bernhard Trefflich won the first stage victory for the GDR in 1953. Shortly before that Erich Honecker, at that time chairman of the Free German Youth, held his first and only speech in Görlitz on the square. Two years later, Täve Schur could be seen. In 1967, the trade union workers' festival took place on the square. For this purpose, a large stage was specially erected on the east side of the square.

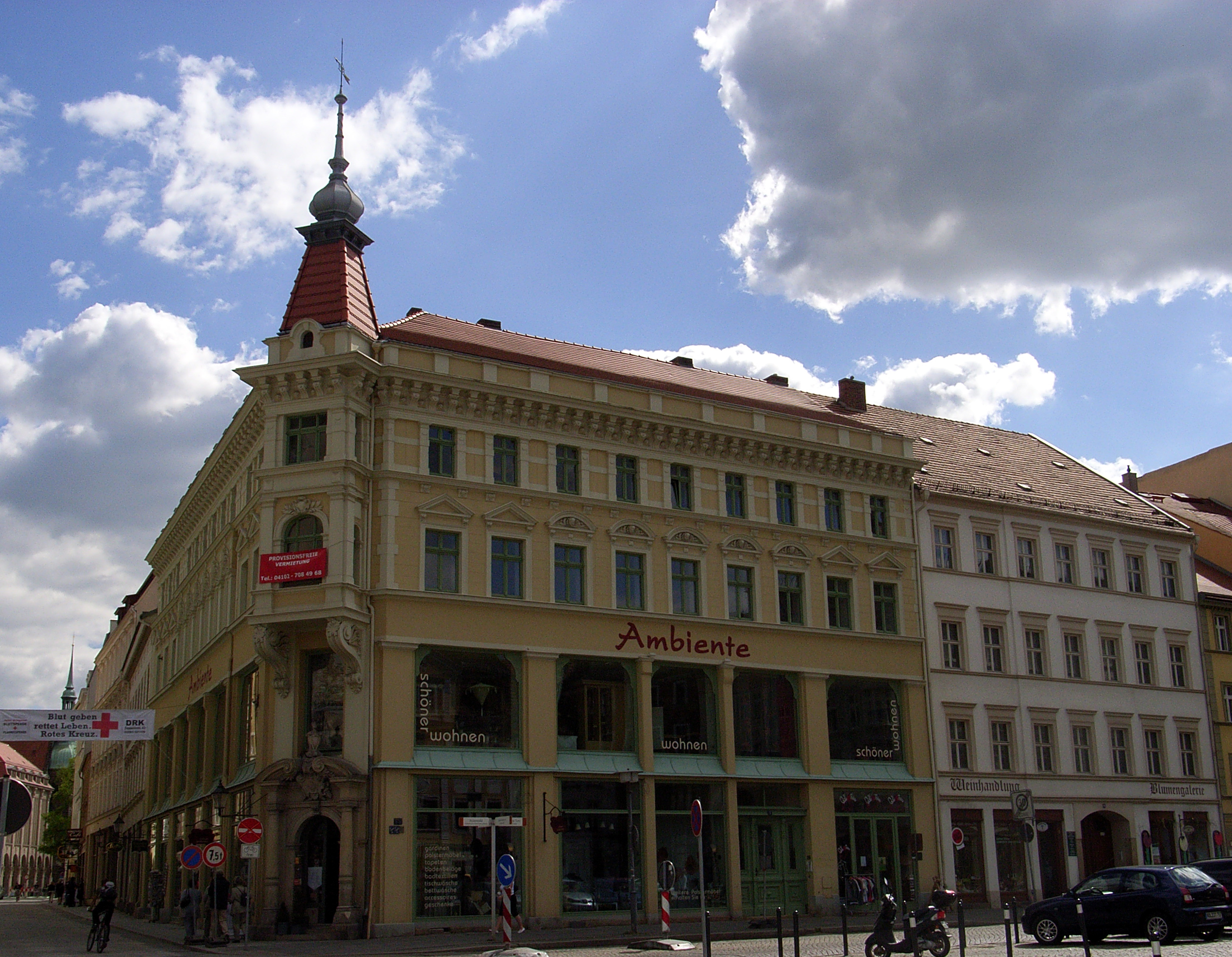
Cornerbuilding Upper Market Square 7

The 1950s saw the renaming of numerous streets and squares, and the Upper Market Square was not spared. From a file in the city archives it is evident that on August 23, 1950, a proposal to rename the Upper Market Square (Obermarkt) to Leninplatz (Site of Lenin) was accepted. The renaming happened officially from the 1.January 1951, but never found entrance in the linguistic usage of many Görlitz citizens. It may well have been due to the lack of logic, because now there was still a Lower Market Square, but no longer an Upper Market Square. For the 100th birthday of Vladimir Lenin in 1970, a memorial plaque and a Lenin portrait relief were attached to the Reichenbach Tower against the reservations of the monument preservationists. On the Lenin memorial plaque the following was written: "Site of Lenin in honor of the founder of the Soviet state and leader of the world proletariat Vladimir Ilyich Lenin 1870-1924 On the occasion of his 100th birthday April 22, 1970". On May 1, 1990, the square was officially given back its old name - Upper Market Square according to the decision of the city assembly on February 21, 1990. Shortly after, on April 27 of the same year, the Lenin memorial plaque and the relief from the Reichenbach Tower were dismantled and came into the fund of the Municipal Art Collection.

On the uprising of 17.June 1953 demonstrations took place in Görlitz as in many other cities of the GDR. In addition to the Lower Market Square, Postplatz and James-von-Moltke street, the Upper Market Square was also a site of events. In the morning and afternoon, several thousand demonstrators from large companies, schools or families crowded the square. The most diverse groups demanded, among other things, norm corrections, price reductions, new elections, freedom of belief and a wider range of goods. Later the events were shamefully hushed up or downplayed. Among the victims of June 17 was radio mechanic Artur Hellwig, who ran a radio electronics store. He provided the demonstrators with a loudspeaker after their urging and received a ten-year prison sentence for it. His younger colleague Horst Kanzog received a sentence of six years. June 17 fits into a series of overthrows or attempted overthrows in the city: begun in 1527 with the craftsmen's uprising, through the revolutionary overthrow attempt in 1848 and the revolution in 1918, the peaceful revolution 1989-1990 for the time being the last uprising to herald the end of the GDR.

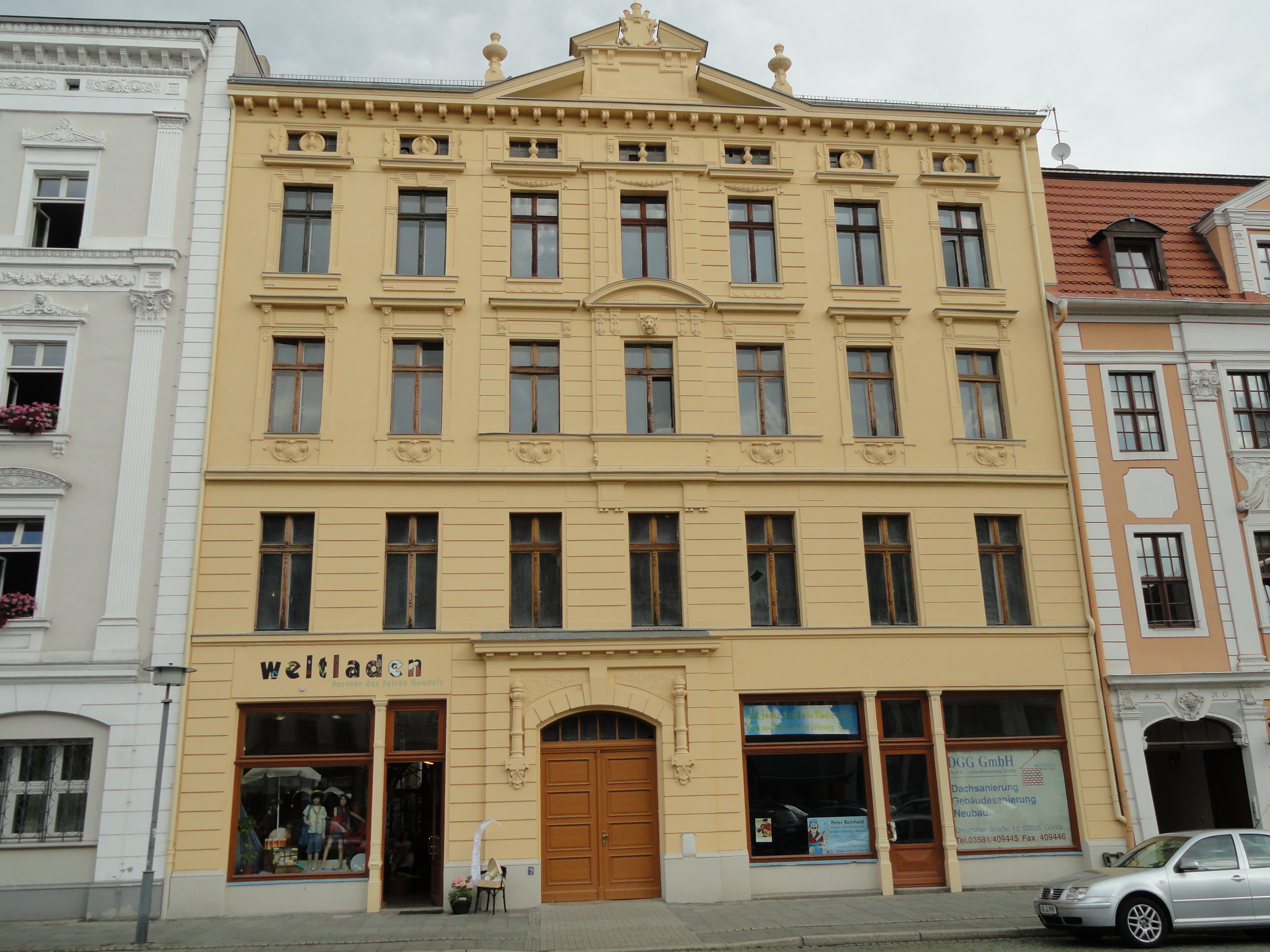
Upper Market Square 23, former store Bild und Ton

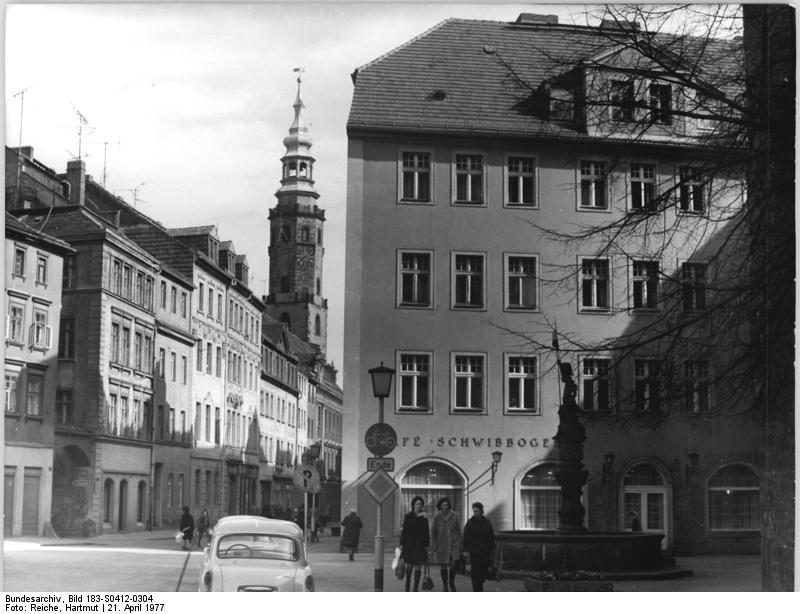
George's fountain in front of the hotel Schwibbogen in 1977

In the 1970s and 80s, more attention was paid to the neglected historic buildings. A large part of the facades and roofs were repaired in order to present an attractive image of the city's architectural heritage to tourist groups. In 1976, the Görlitz Information opened in house No. 29 ("Napoleon House"). Napoleon is said to have taken off a parade of troops from the balcony of this house on August 20, 1813. A plaque on the facade of the house refers to other important guests in this house. Meanwhile, the tourist information is located a few houses further in the direction of Bretheren Street (Brüderstraße) in the house No. 32. The density of stores declined in the 1970s and 1980s. Nevertheless, the square still invited shoppers with a few stores, including Bild und Ton (No. 23), Elektro (installation and repairs, corner house to Klosterplatz) and An- und Verkauf (No. 7). The building Upper Market Square No. 26 housed socio-political organizations such as the Kulturbund, the Urania-Society for the dissemination of scientific knowledge and the Society for German-Soviet Friendship. For the 900th anniversary of the city in 1971, a Görlitz-institution opened in the southern corner house to Bretheren Street - the "Café Schwibbogen".

In October 1989, the flags of the GDR flew for the last time at the Historic Town Festival on the Upper Market Square. On Republic Day, 40 years under SED rule, many private citizens had worked diligently to give the square a lively face worth seeing. The Holy Trinity Church under Pastor Friedrich Ilgner also opened its doors and invited citizens to forums for discussion. In November 1989, the demonstrators of the peaceful revolution marched through the Upper Market Square towards the city leaders in the Görlitz Town Hall.

=== 1990 to present ===
On September 27, 1990, Helmut Kohl spoke to an enthusiastic crowd on the Upper Market Square. The future chancellor took a five-minute dip in the crowd before his speech. According to the Dresdner Morgenpost, 25,000 people in the square were said to have watched Kohl's speech. There were black-red-gold flags flying already without the GDR emblem and the gold-white Lower Silesian flag. Helmut Kohl is said to have inquired what this gold and white flag meant and then opened his speech with the words, "Dear Lower Silesians." He gave two more speeches in Görlitz in the following years, but these were at smaller venues. On November 24, 1990, the CDU politician was followed by the SPD chairman Willy Brandt. Görlitz was considered a stronghold of social democracy until 1933. Brandt, however, had to be content with a much smaller number of participants.

Only a few commercial tenants survived the reunification and with it the tougher competition of the market economy. These included the Ullrich funeral home, the Gruske butcher shop and the inns Zum Nachtschmied and Café Schwibbogen. The Ullrich funeral home was now the oldest business on the Upper Market Square. However, many new tenants were found, including some restaurants and cafés, a flower store, an interior decorator, a small grocery store, a health insurance company and other businesses. Some only made it a few years, such as Sport-Petzold and Spielwaren Zippel. This store with the owner and saleswoman Gisela Zippel was considered an institution by many Görlitz citizens. She moved from Schulstraße corner Berliner Straße to the square in 1993 and closed her store in 1997 after her retirement and 60 years in business. The number of residential tenants also declined despite increasingly good renovation conditions. This was also due to the decline in population throughout the city, but probably also to noise pollution from traffic and the large parking lots in the square. However, the Upper Market Square is still the starting point and gateway to the historic town of Görlitz, e.g. to the Lower Market Square with a remarkable number of renaissance buildings, as well as the site of numerous events, for example the street theater festival Via-Thea, the Silesian Tippelmarkt, parts of the Christkindelmarkt and the Görlitz Historic Town Festival.
