= Thick Tower =

Tower in Görlitz, Germany

- Dicker Turm
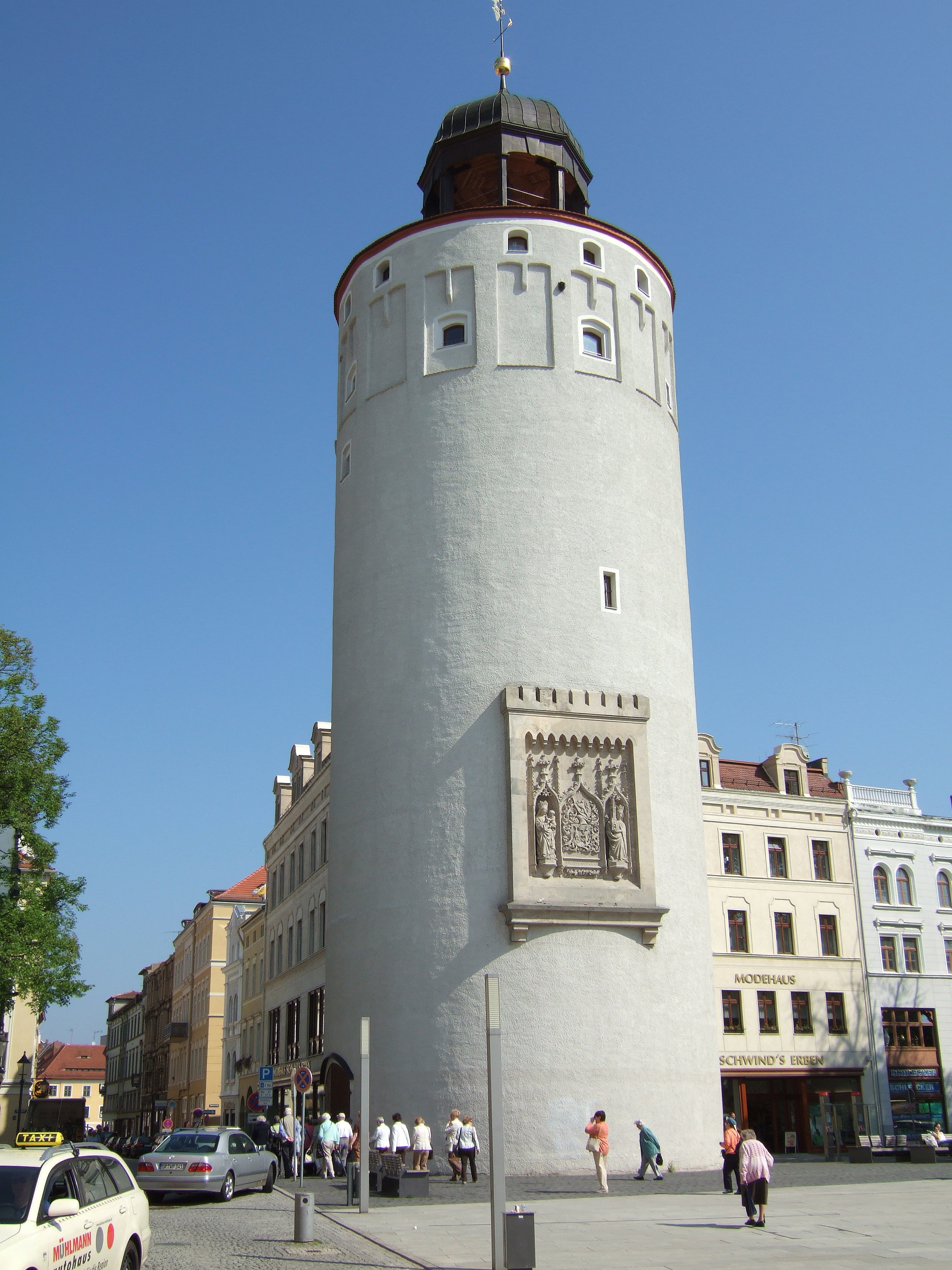
- Originally, part of the historic fortification, the Thick Tower is now located in the center of Görlitz

General information
- Type: fortified tower
- Coordinates: 51.1538°N 14.9871°E
- Completed: 1250
- Owner: City of Görlitz
- Height: 46m

Website
- City's Webpage Guided Tour

The Thick Tower (German: Dicker Turm, pronounced [dɪkɐ tʊrm]) erected in 1250 is part of the historic fortification of Görlitz. The 46-metre (151 ft) tall tower is the most massive tower in the city. Its walls in the lower part reach a thickness of 5.34 metres (17.5 ft), thus the name of a thick tower. Apart from it, the Nikolai Tower and the Reichenbach Tower are still preserved. In total, Görlitz had four large watchtowers and defense towers.

== History ==
The tower was erected in 1250. In 1305 a stone tower and a stone gate next to the stone street were mentioned. The tower guard got a living room and a chamber inside the tower in 1529, which have been abolished in October 1904.

The tower kept its appearance throughout the centuries. However the fighting platform was walled up and a new copper hood in Renaissance style was added in the 16th century.

The former triple gateway next to the tower has been demolished. Originally the inner gate was connected to the city walls and stood in front of the tower on the Stone street. The middle passage was covered with a building and had a portcullis made of wood and equipped with iron shoes. The outer gate was a fortified building similar to a bastion. A stone bridge spanned the trench. The bridge and the gate were connected by another drawbridge, which has been replaced in 1772. In 1778 the portcullis was removed and in 1838 the outer and the middle gate were removed. In 1847-48 the inner gate and the stone bridge were demolished. The trench was filled.

Between 1974 and 1999 students of the local university used the upper tower for their parties. Since 2006 tourists can book guided tours on the tower.

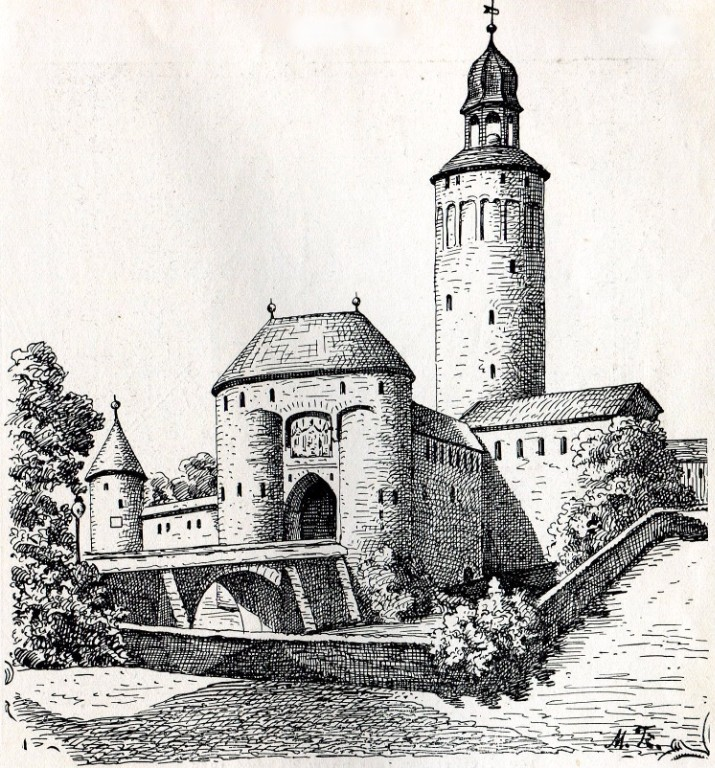
Historic fortification next to the tower

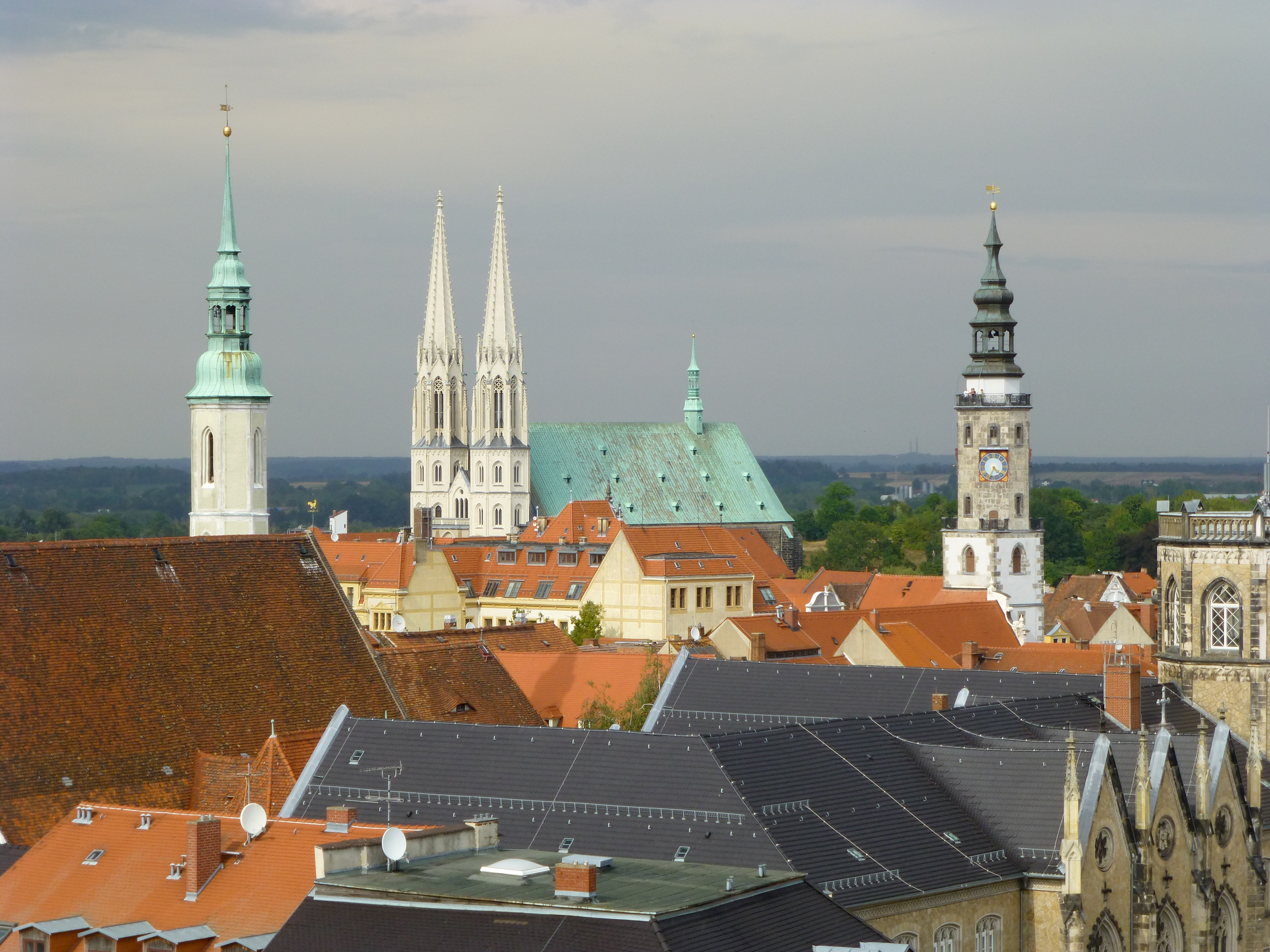
View from the tower

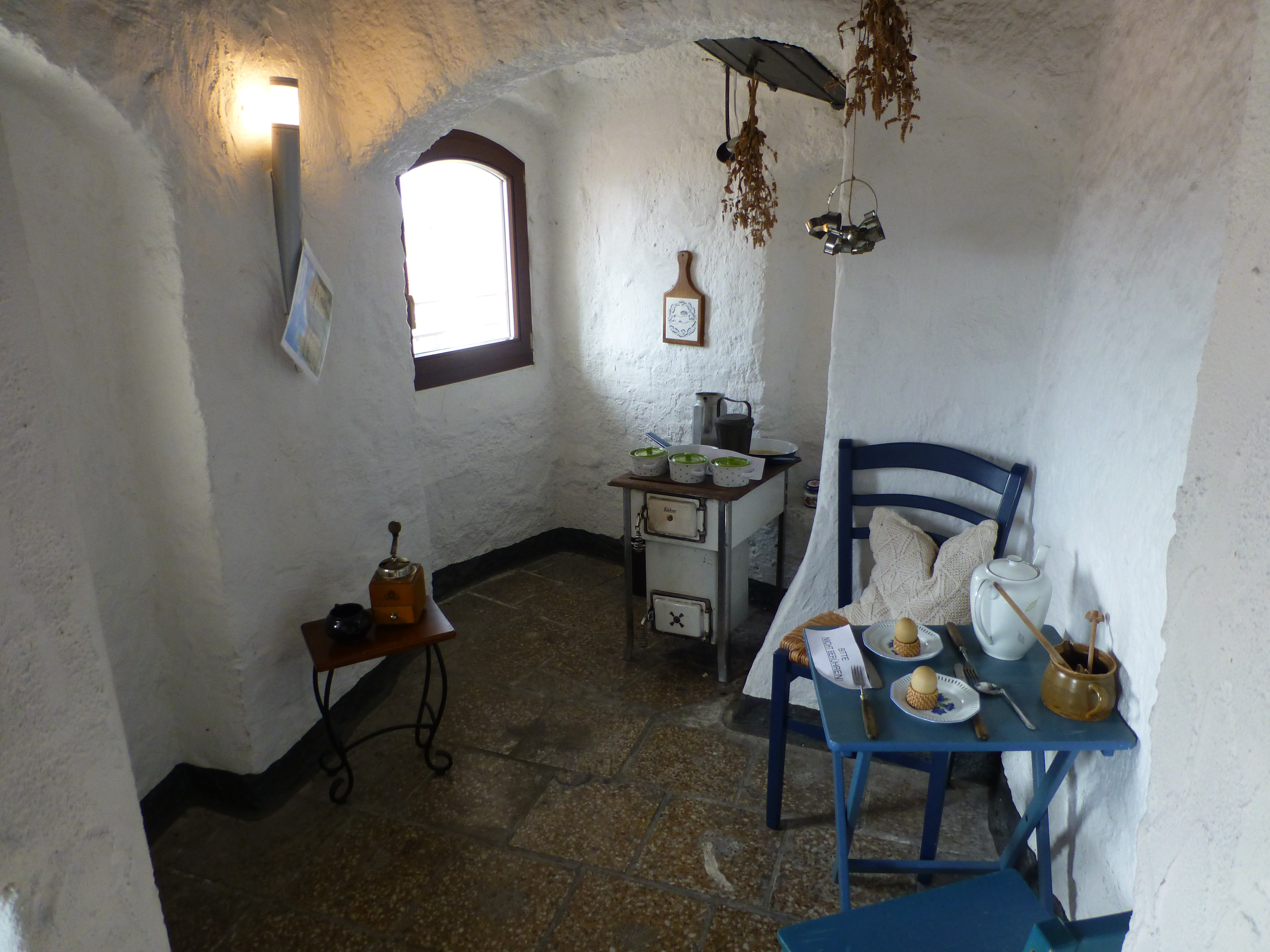
Tower premises

== Sandstone Relief ==
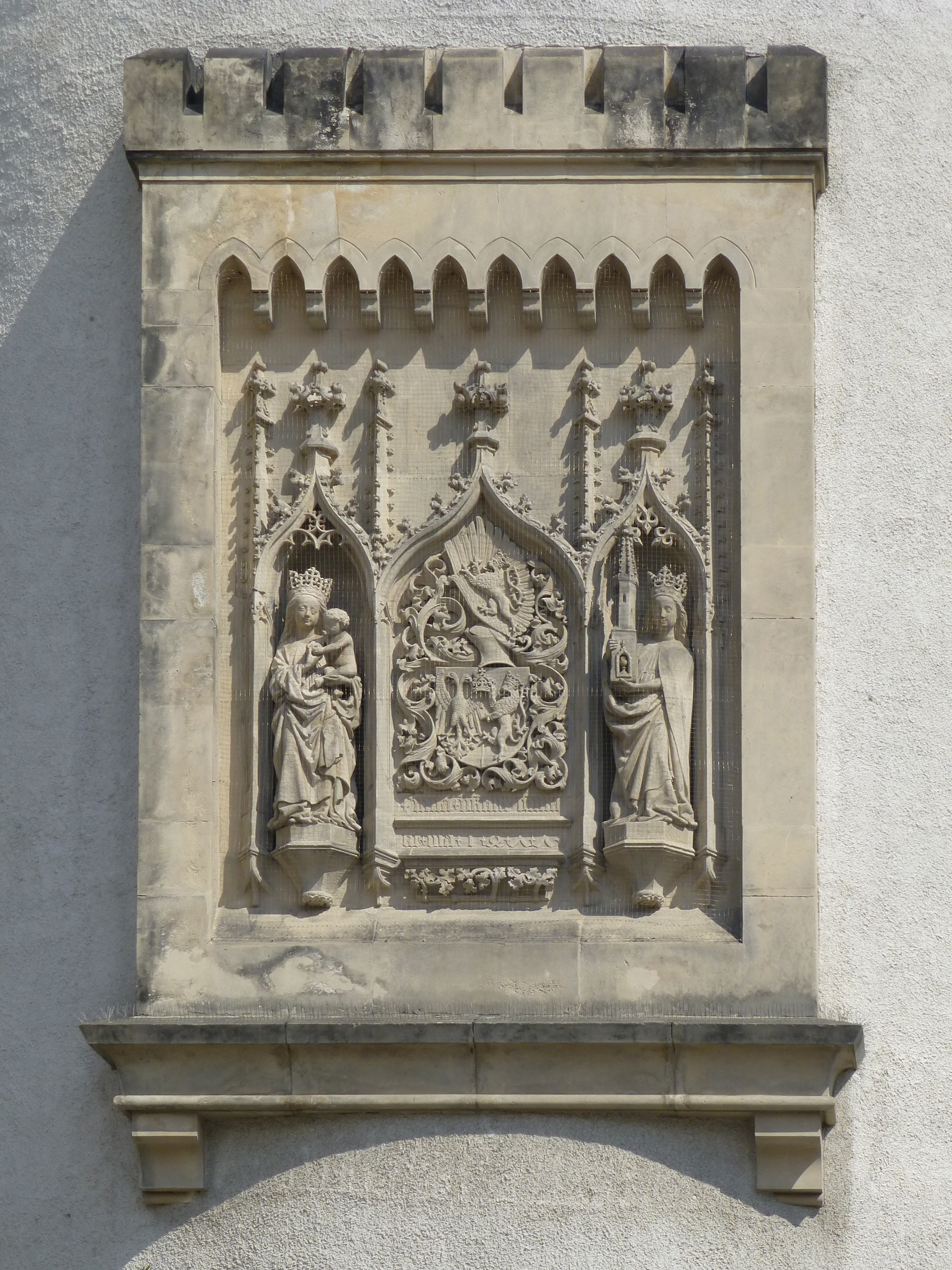
Sandstone relief

Since the town had been loyal to the crown during the Hussite wars, it was awarded a town coat of arms by Emperor Sigismund. The sandstone relief by Briccius Gauske on the tower depicts this coat of arms together with the two figures of Mary and Saint Barbara. Originally the relief was located next to the inner gate, but was attached to the tower in 1856.

The inscription on the relief states...

INVIA VIRTUTI NULLA EST VIA
No path is impossible for bravery
