= Nikolai Tower (Görlitz) =

- Nikolaiturm
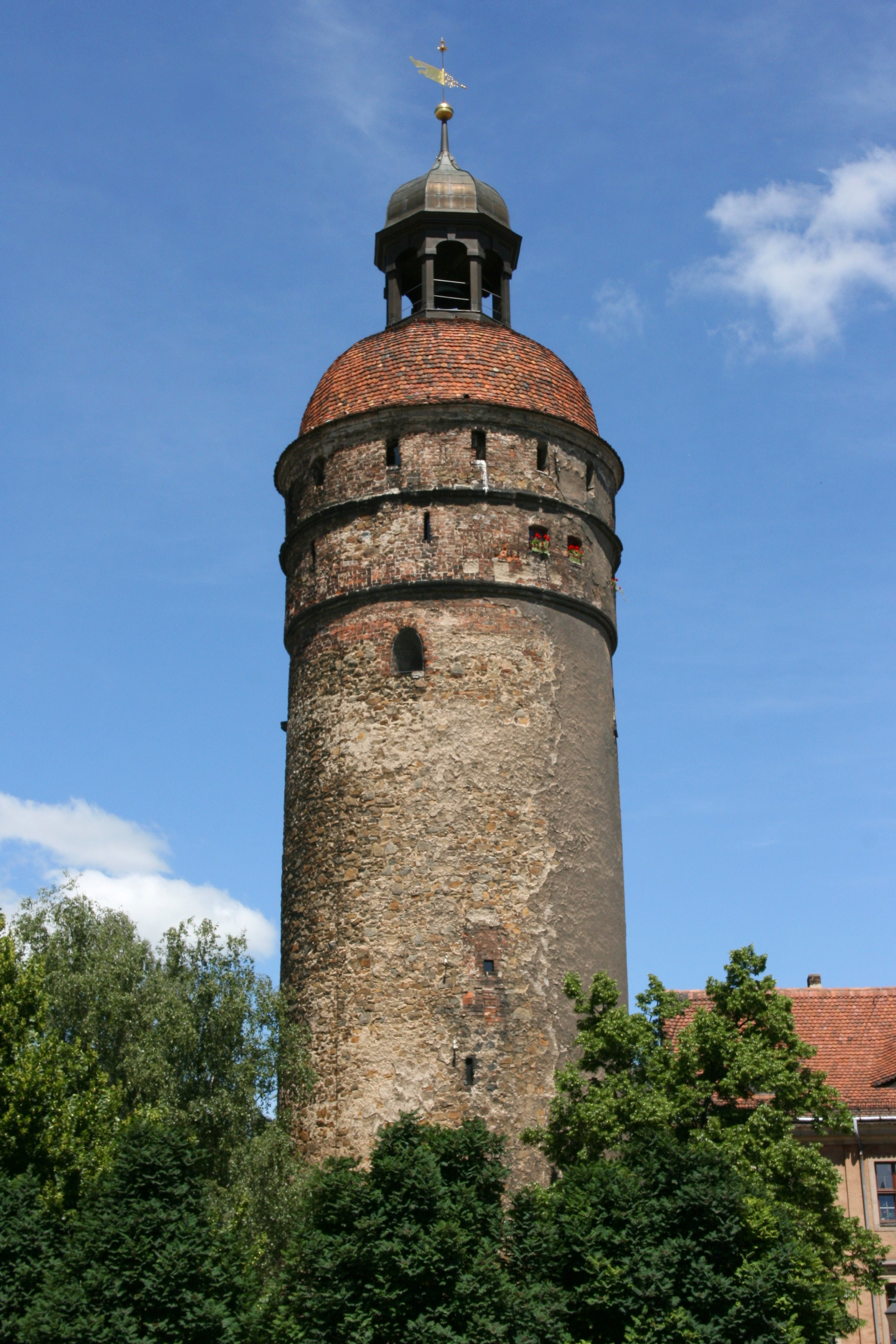
- Originally a part of the fortification, the Nicolai Tower is located between the historic parts of the city Görlitz

General information
- Type: Fortified tower
- Coordinates: 51.1583°N 14.9898°E
- Completed: probably before 1250, first mentioned in 1348
- Owner: City of Görlitz
- Height: 45m

Website
- City's Webpage Guided Tour

The 45m tall Nikolai Tower (German: Nikolaiturm, pronounced [nikoˈlaɪ̯tʊɐ̯m]) probably erected before 1250 is part of the historic fortification of Görlitz. It is located inside the inner part of Görlitz between the old town and the historic nikolai suburb (Nikolaivorstadt). Together with the Thick Tower and the Reichenbach Tower three of four fortified towers are still preserved in Görlitz.

== History ==
Presumably, the Nikolai Tower was already part of the Görlitz city fortification before the first major expansion of the city in 1250. However it was first mentioned in a document from 1348. Like other towers of the city the Nikolai Tower had a fortified gateway with three gates. The inner gate was located between the tower and the nikolai zwinger. The middle passage was covered with a building and had a portcullis. The outer gate was located on the trench, connected via a drawbridge. The access to the tower was through the city wall or through an external staircase. After the town fire in 1717 the slim and steep hood was replaced by a baroque hood.

Like other parts of the cities fortification the gateway, the bridge and the trench were removed in 1848. The last tower guard left in 1904.

With no military usages the tower premises were used by a society of local history researchers (Zirkel Görlitzer Heimatforschern e.V.) between 1969 and 2015 to exhibit old locks, metal mounts and lights.

The exhibition can still be visited in a guided tour and the tower is used as an observation tower.

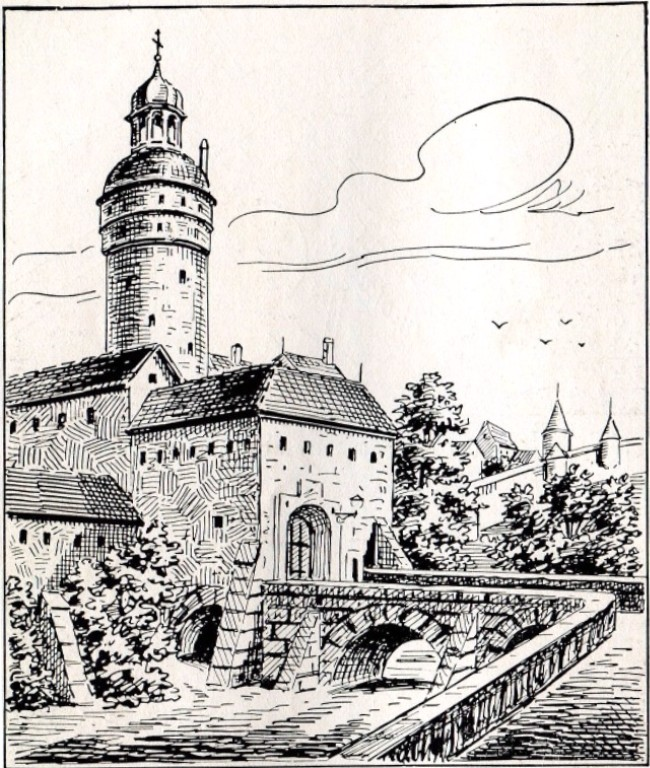
Historic Gateway next to the Nicolai Tower

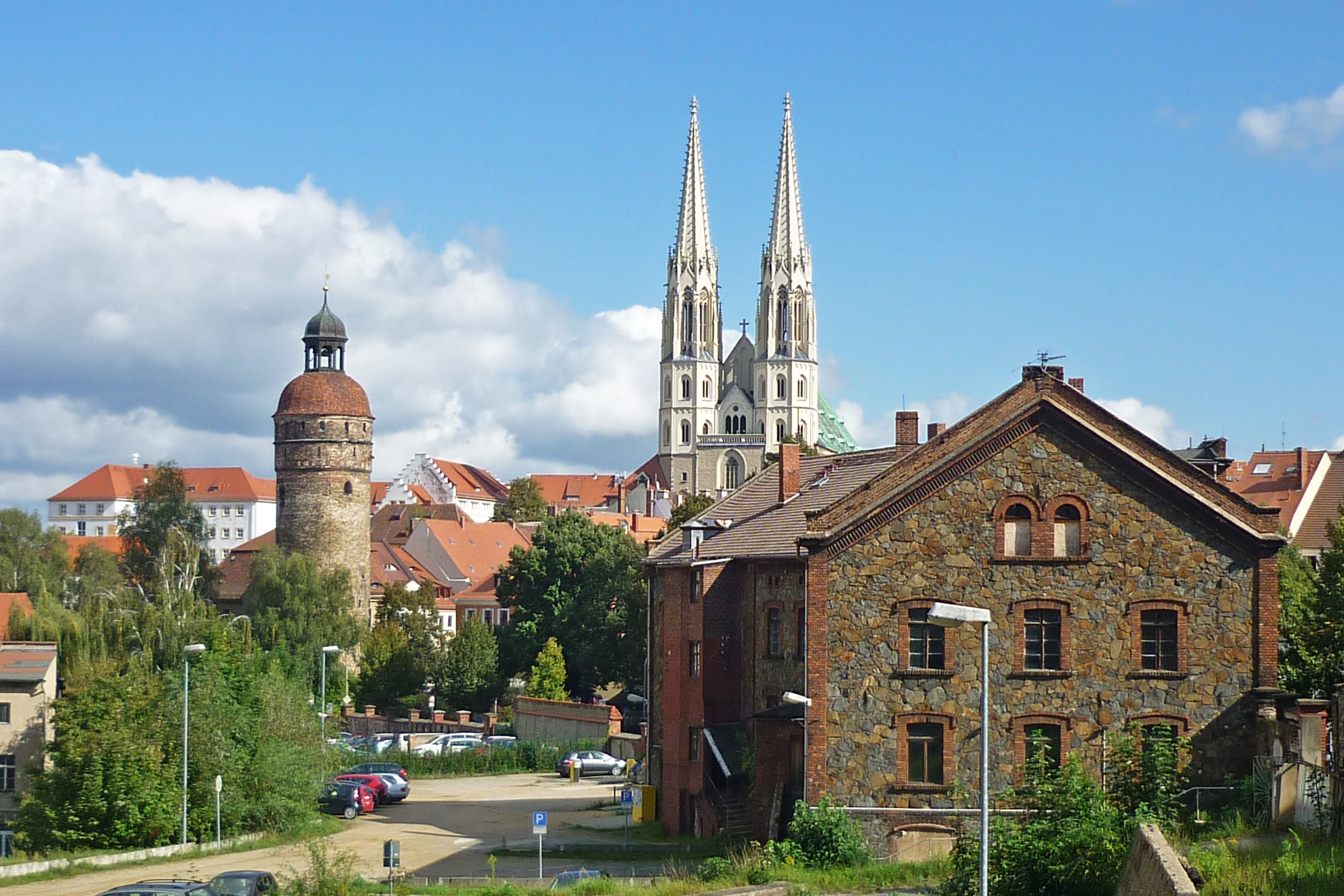
Nicolai Tower and Parish church St. Peter and Paul

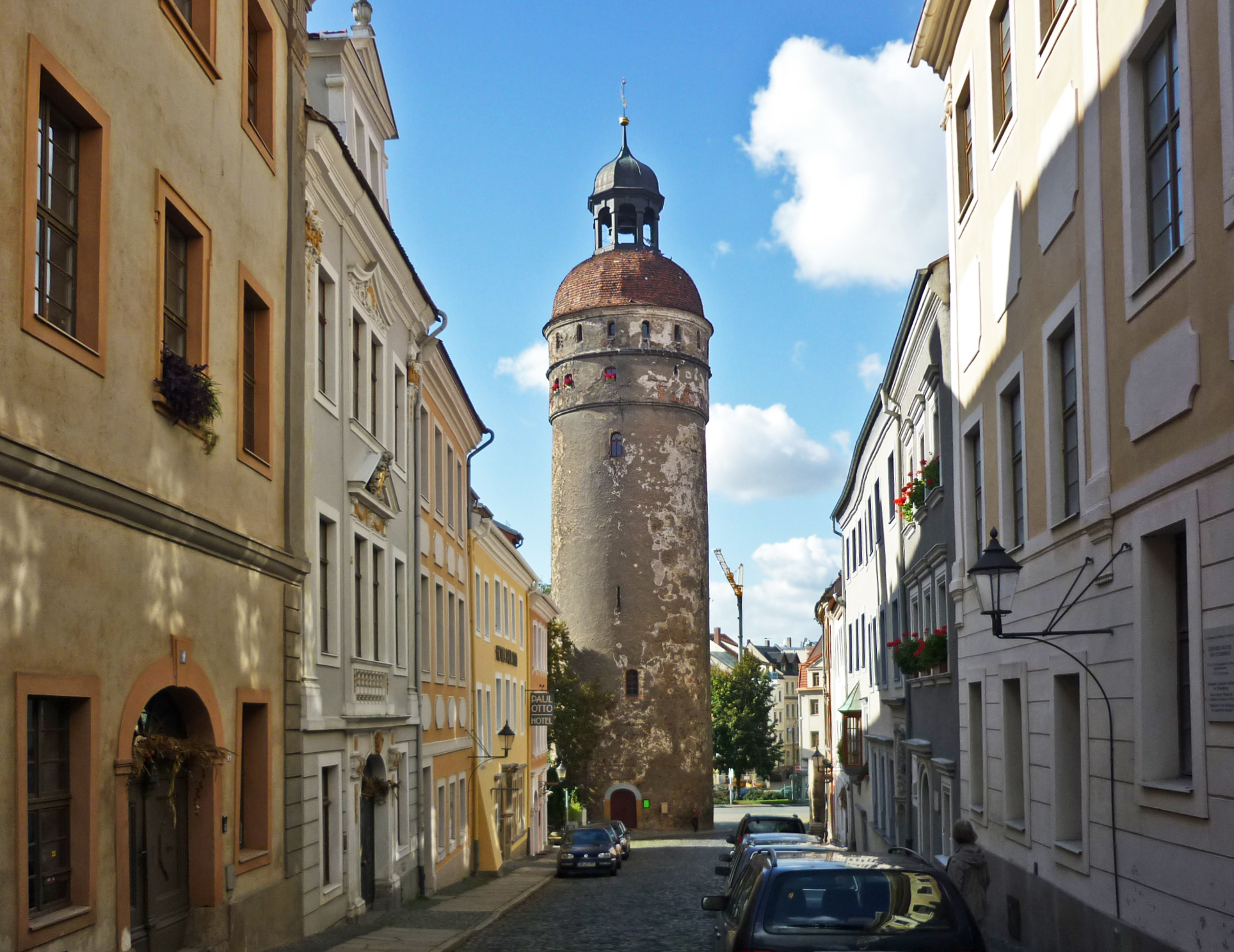
View from Nikolai street
