= Woad House (Görlitz) =

Building in Gorlitz, Germany

Woad house
- Waidhaus
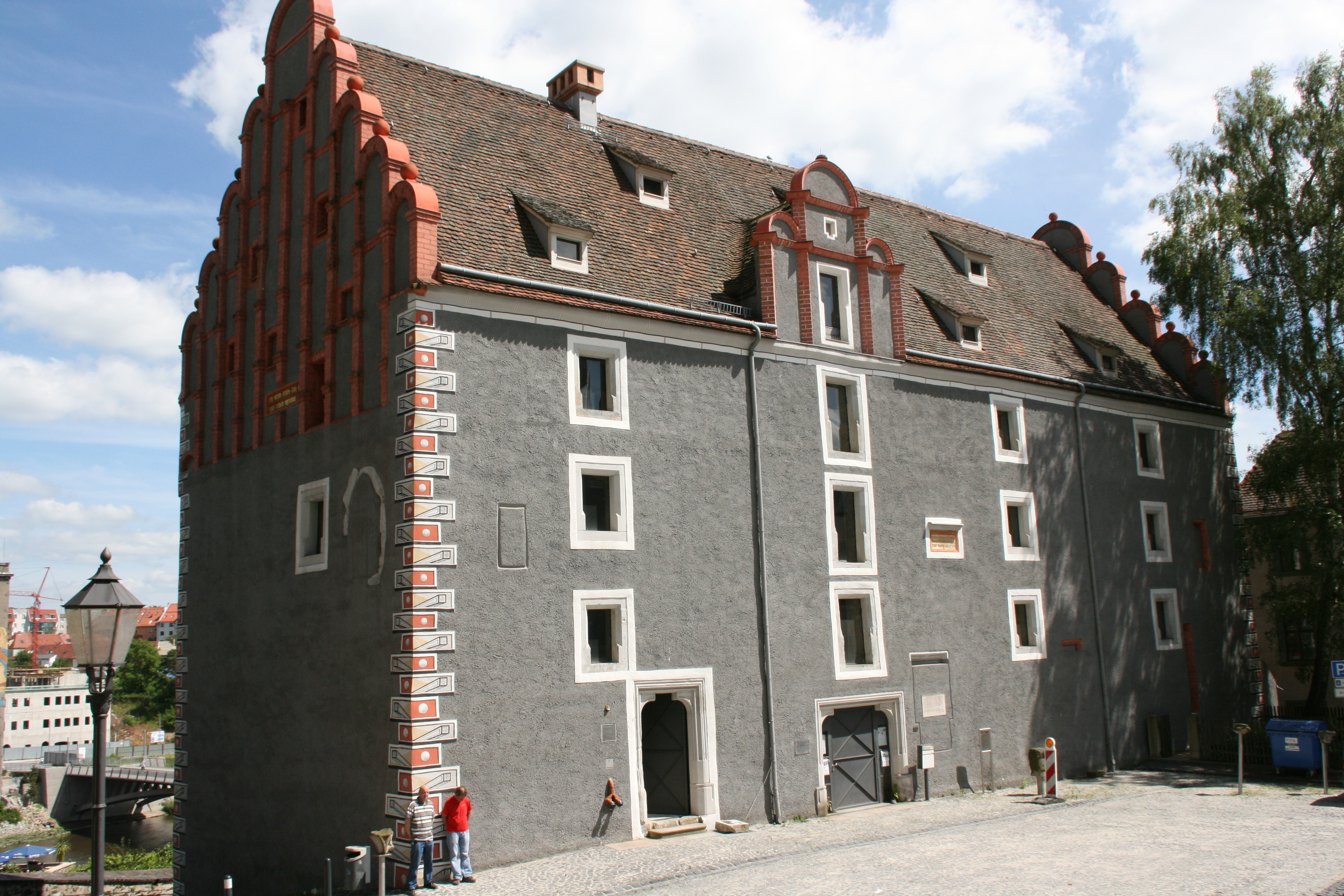
- View from the west-side
- Interactive map of the Woad house area

General information
- Location: Bei der Peterskirche 8, 02826 Görlitz
- Coordinates: 51.15794°N 14.992609°E
- Construction started: 12th century
- Renovated: 15th century (floors added), 1936 (gable reconstruction), 1993 (general refurbishment)

The Woad House (German: Waidhaus, pronounced [ˈvaɪthaʊs]; Upper Sorbian: Waid-dom) is the oldest secular building of Görlitz. During its rich history it served various purposes and underwent numerous alterations. The common name Woad House is based on the woad that was stored in this building in the 16th century.

== Location ==
The Woad House is located on the plateau between the parish church of St. Peter and Paul on north side and the Hainwald buildings on the south side. A small preacher alley separates the Woad House from the Hainwald buildings. Easterly the plateau slopes steeply towards the banks of the Lusatian Neisse. A walkway connects the river banks with the plateau and the church's forecourt.

== History ==
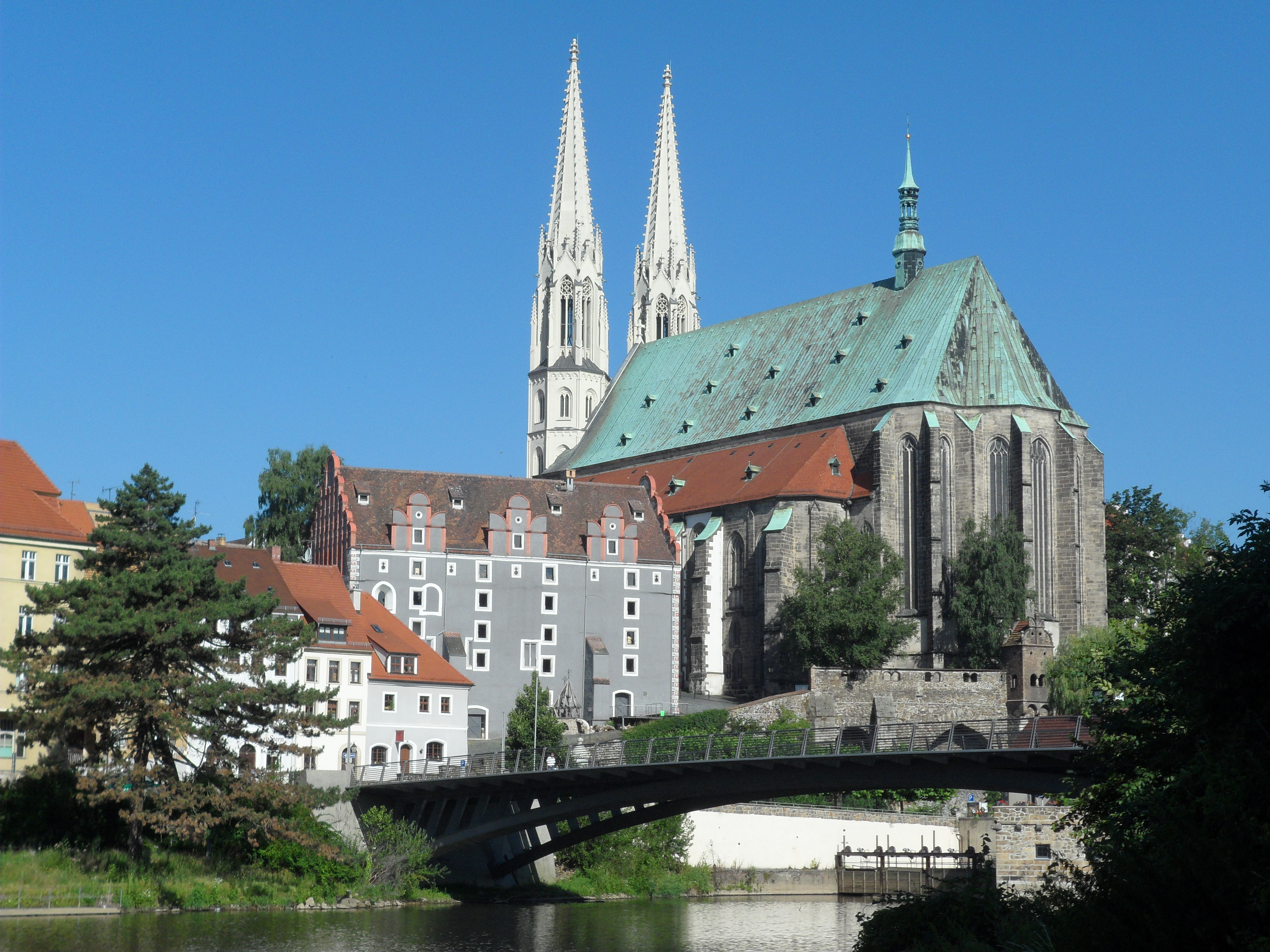
View of the Waidhaus and parish church of St. Peter and Paul from the east

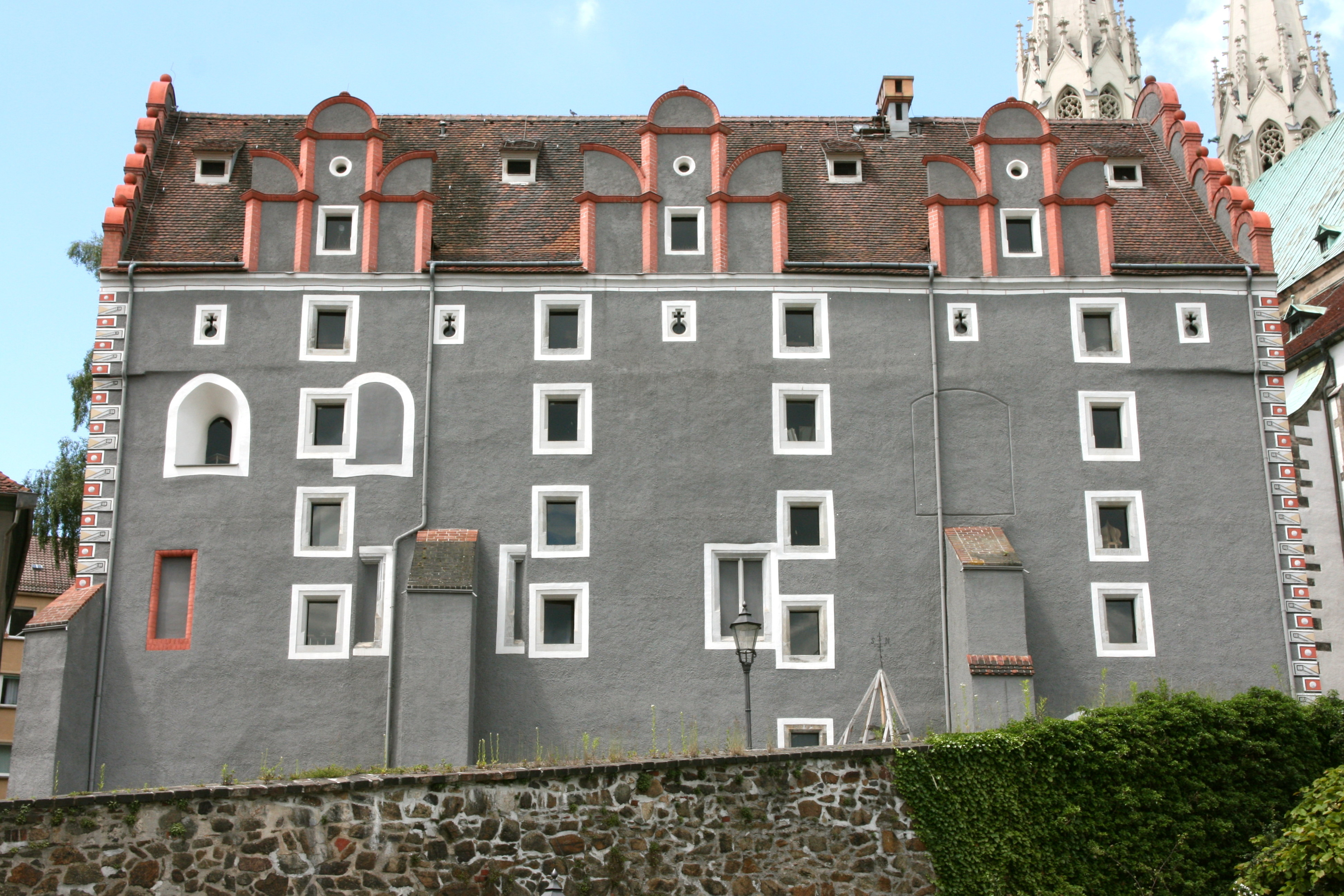
The eastern face of the building with the three reconstructed wall dormers

The origins of the building date back to the 12th century, when the building was part of a courtyard that served the lord's castle and was probably managed by Bohemian servants. Newer research suggests, that it might have been the residential building of a noble family too: It had its own tower, which is very likely for yards of noble families of that time and it was very closely located (or even part of) the bigger courtyard Vogtshof that was managed by a bohemian Amtmann.

In the 14th century the building was used as a brewery yard. Later, in the 15th century, the owners changed quickly. Among them, the Görlitz mayor Bartholomäus Eberhard was the most noted owner, after whom the property was named for a long time. In 1425, the city acquired the house from his heirs. At this time the building had a tower - the Tower of Eberhard - that was deconstructed during the Hussite Wars the following year. The Erfurt auxiliary under Tiezmann von Weberstedt moved into the courtyard between the end of April and mid-June 1428. The court also served as accommodation for the Bohemian nobleman Johann von Michelsberg for more than three months in 1432.

From 1447 to 1529, the Waidhaus was used as a school building. In 1530, the school was moved to Krebsgasse 7 to make room for woad storage. Probably during this period another three floors were added and the building reached its present height. Before that time woad was stored and sold in private homes. In 1529, the already older inscription "Nil actum creades, cum quid restabit agendum 1479" was probably also walled in on the north gable, remembering a severe fire in 1479 due to a lightning strike. In 1578, the wall dormers were removed, thus flattening the roof.

The building got the other common name Renthaus (German: Rente engl. pension) from its use as a warehouse for the bailiwick pension. Until 1732 the bailiff stored his grain here.

From 1897 to 1907, the professional fire service of Görlitz had its fire station inside the building. Later, they moved to the Gobbin- and Kröl street.

During work on the building in 1908, about 50 stonemason's marks surfaced in a room inside. From this it was concluded that the building was probably also used at that time as a stone hut for the workers on the parish church of St. Peter and Paul.

The historic gables were restored in 1936 according to a woodcut from 1565. After German Reunification efforts were undertaken to refurbish the building. The wall dormers had been reconstructed according to the same woodcut as well.

From 1992 onwards, the German Foundation for Monument Protection used the interiors of the building as a training center for craftsmanship and preservation of monuments. Due to a lack of funding and demand the courses stopped in 2016, despite being highlighted as an exemplary educational center for the qualification of craftsmen for the preservation of European building heritage by the Council of Europe. As of March 2021, the building was unused.
