= Reichenbach Tower (Görlitz) =

Tower in Görlitz

- Reichenbacher Turm
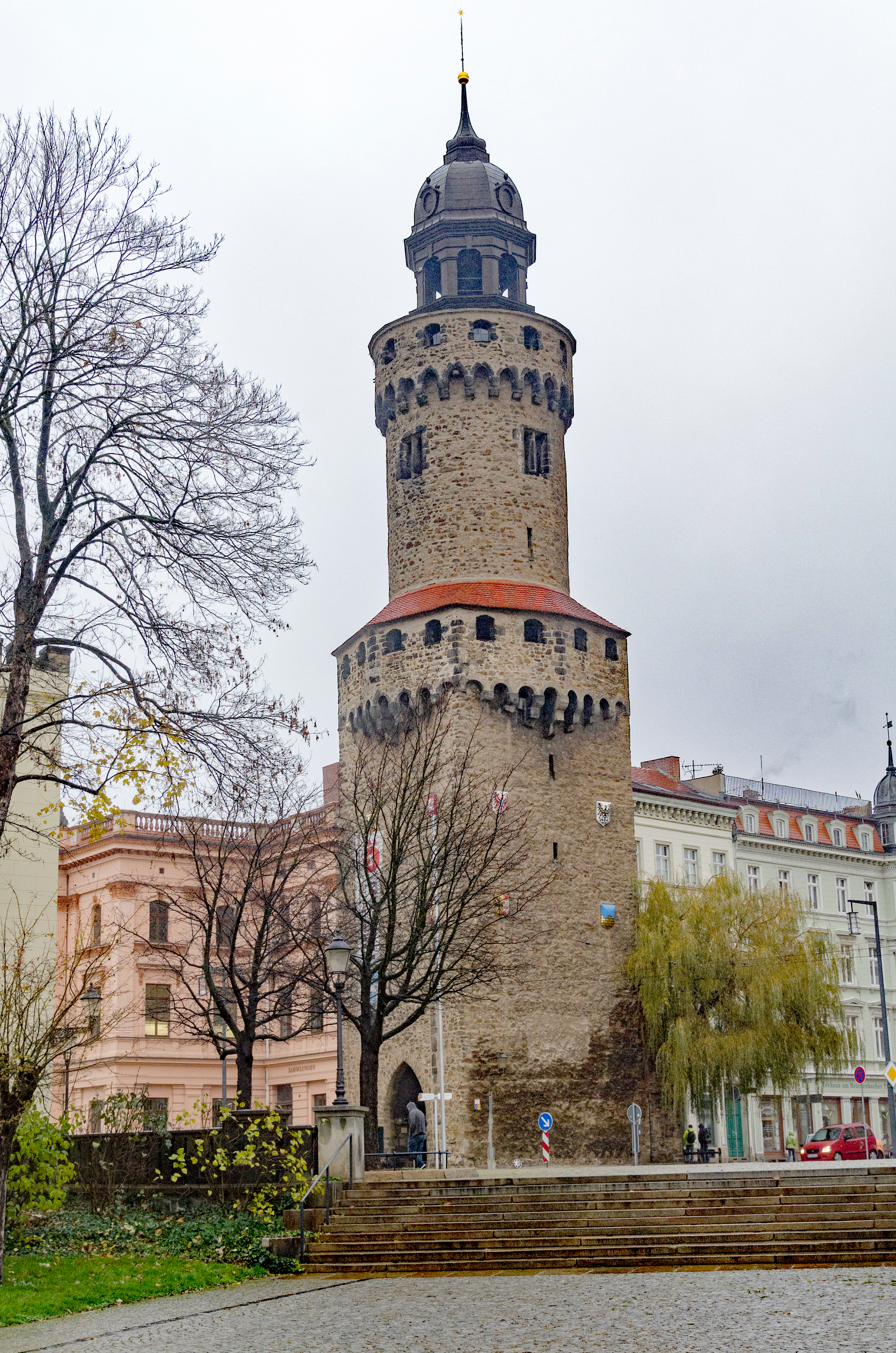
- Originally, part of the historic fortification, the Reichenbach Tower is now located in the center of Görlitz

General information
- Type: Fortified tower
- Coordinates: 51.1549°N 14.9855°E
- Completed: probably 13th century, first mentioned in 1376
- Owner: City of Görlitz
- Height: 51m

Website
- City's Webpage Guided Tour

The Reichenbach Tower (German: Reichenbacher Turm, pronounced [ˈʁaɪçn̩baxɐ ˈtʊʁm]) probably built in the 13th century and first mentioned in 1376 is the western part of the historic fortification of Görlitz. With a height of 51m it is the tallest of the three fortified towers in Görlitz. (the other two being Thick Tower and Nikolai Tower).

== History ==
Probably the history of the tower dates back to the 13th century, when the Upper Market (Obermarkt) was laid out. The tower was first mentioned in 1376. Above the cubic lower part an octagon with a monopitch roof was put on. It merges into a cylindrical upper tower. The tower is crowned by circular battlements with Lombard band and the hood.

The circular battlements on top of the tower and a wooden hood were added in 1485. The Reichenbach Tower was connected in 1521 with the Kaisertrutz (another fortified tower erected in 1490) by two walls. The late wooden gothic tower hood had been replaced in 1782 by a baroque copper hood. The gateway and the connecting walls were demolished in 1862 and shortly after a pedestrian passage was built through the tower.

The last tower guard left in 1904 and the bells ring electric since then. Due to severe damage, the tower was extensively restored from 1935. During the restoration work in 1936, eight steel anchors were inserted into the lower part of the tower, which were hidden behind twelve colored coats of arms made by the painter Arno Henschel from Görlitz. The upper six crests show the states Görlitz belonged to in the past: Holy Roman Empire, Bohemia, Brandenburg, Prussia, Silesia and finally Saxony. The lower six crest show the city emblems of members of Lusatian League.

With no military usages after World War II the tower is now used as a viewing tower and is part of a historico-cultural museum (Görlitzer Sammlungen)

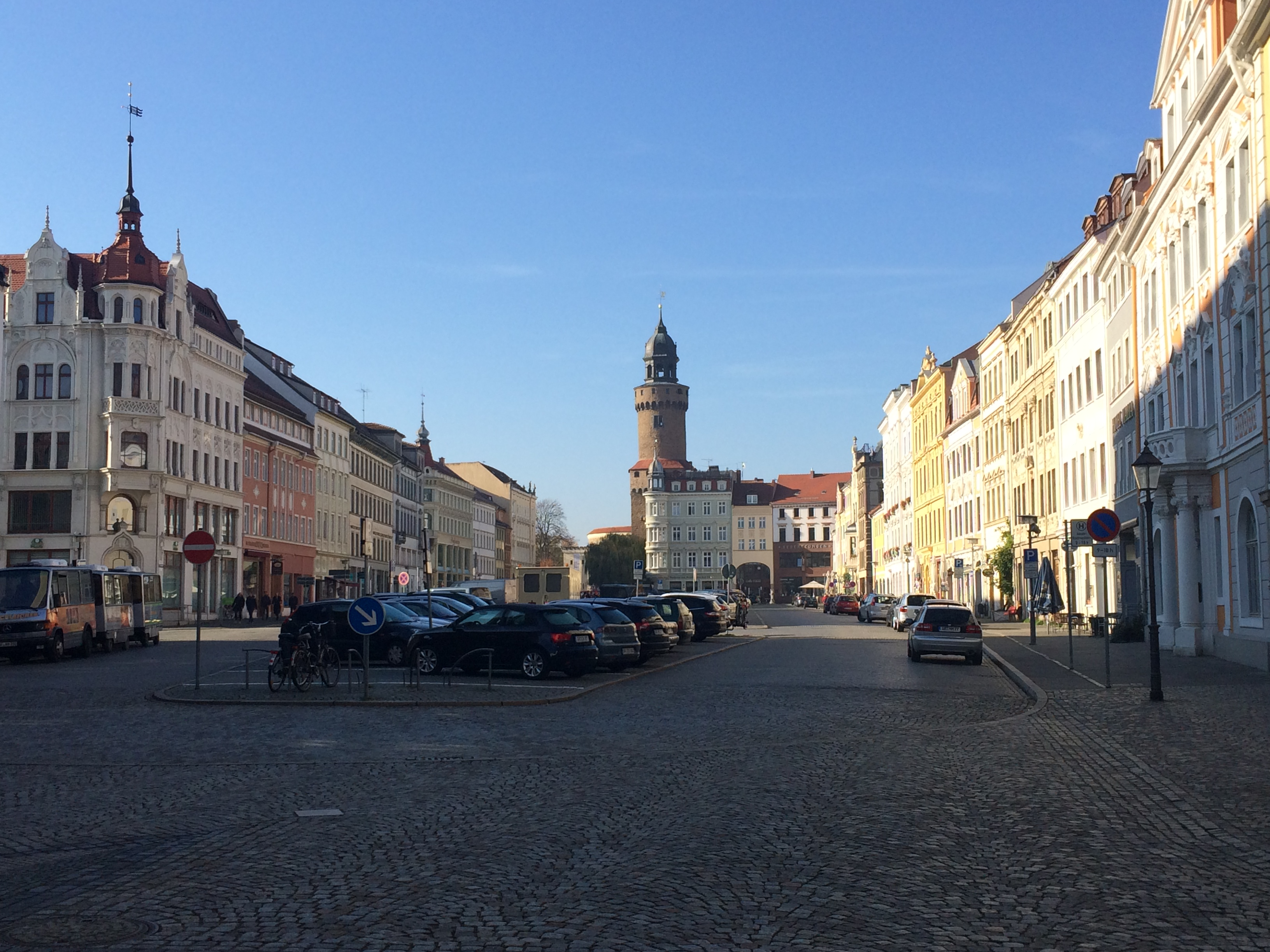
View from the Upper Market

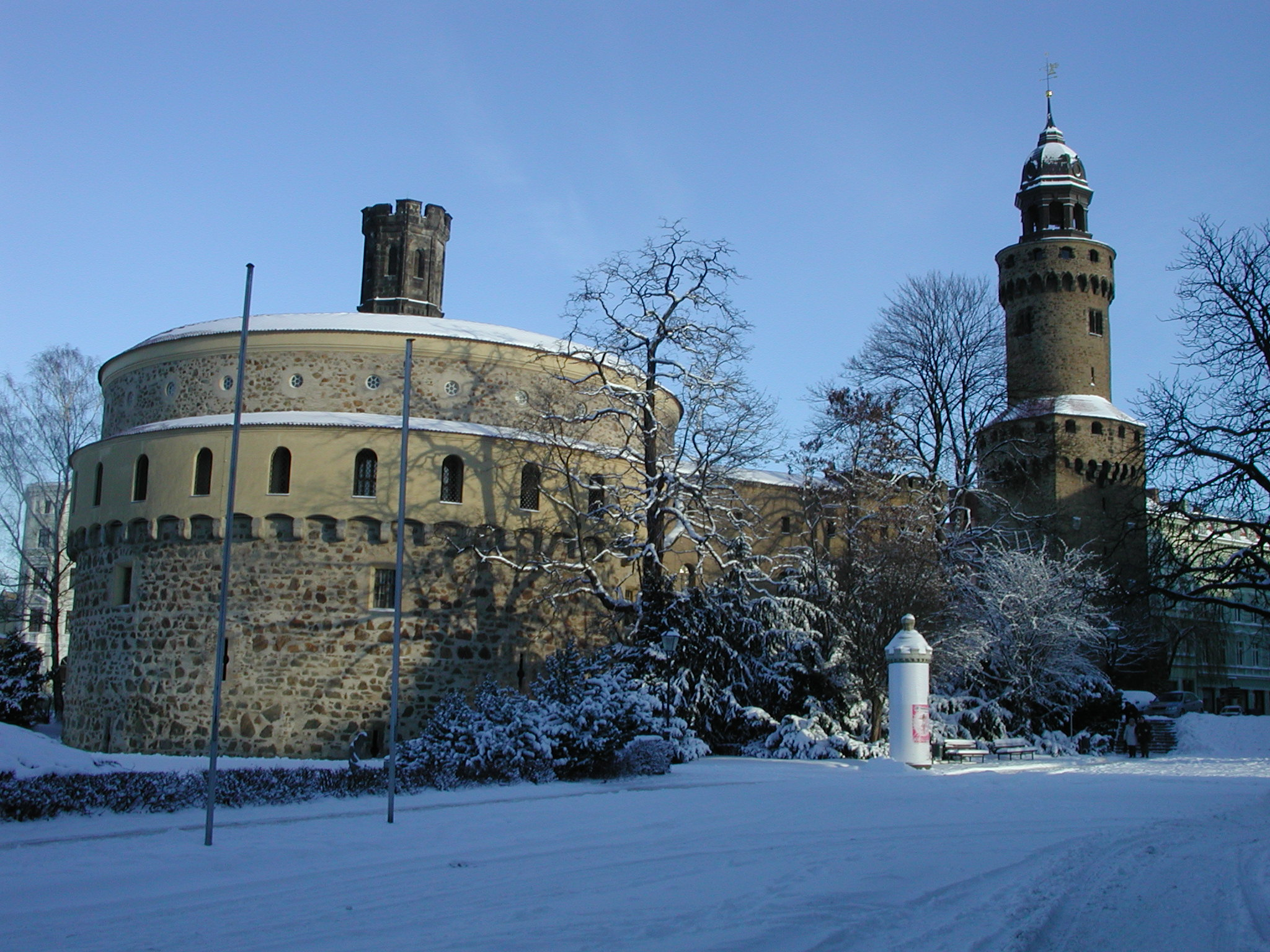
Kaisertrutz and Reichenbach Tower

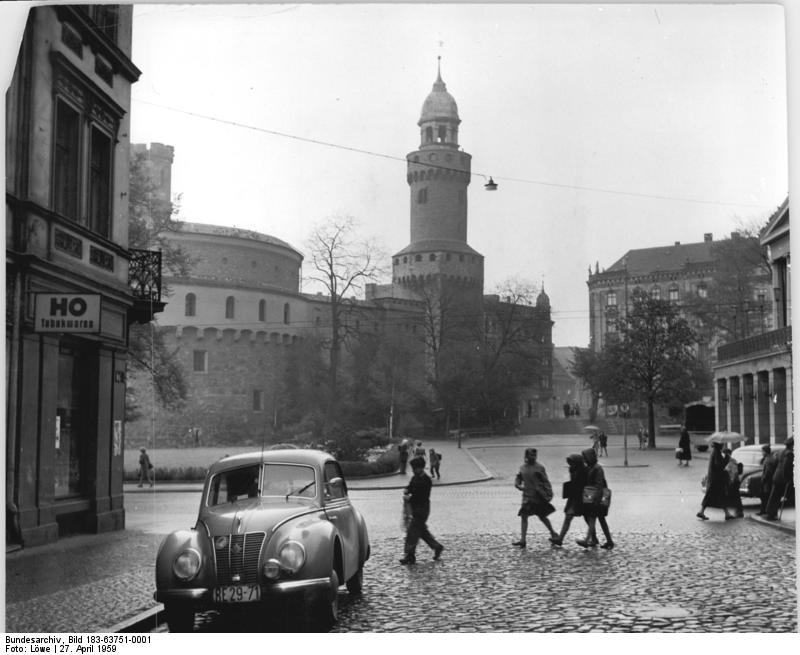
Reichenbach Tower in 1959
