= Spitzkunnersdorfer Bach =

River in Germany

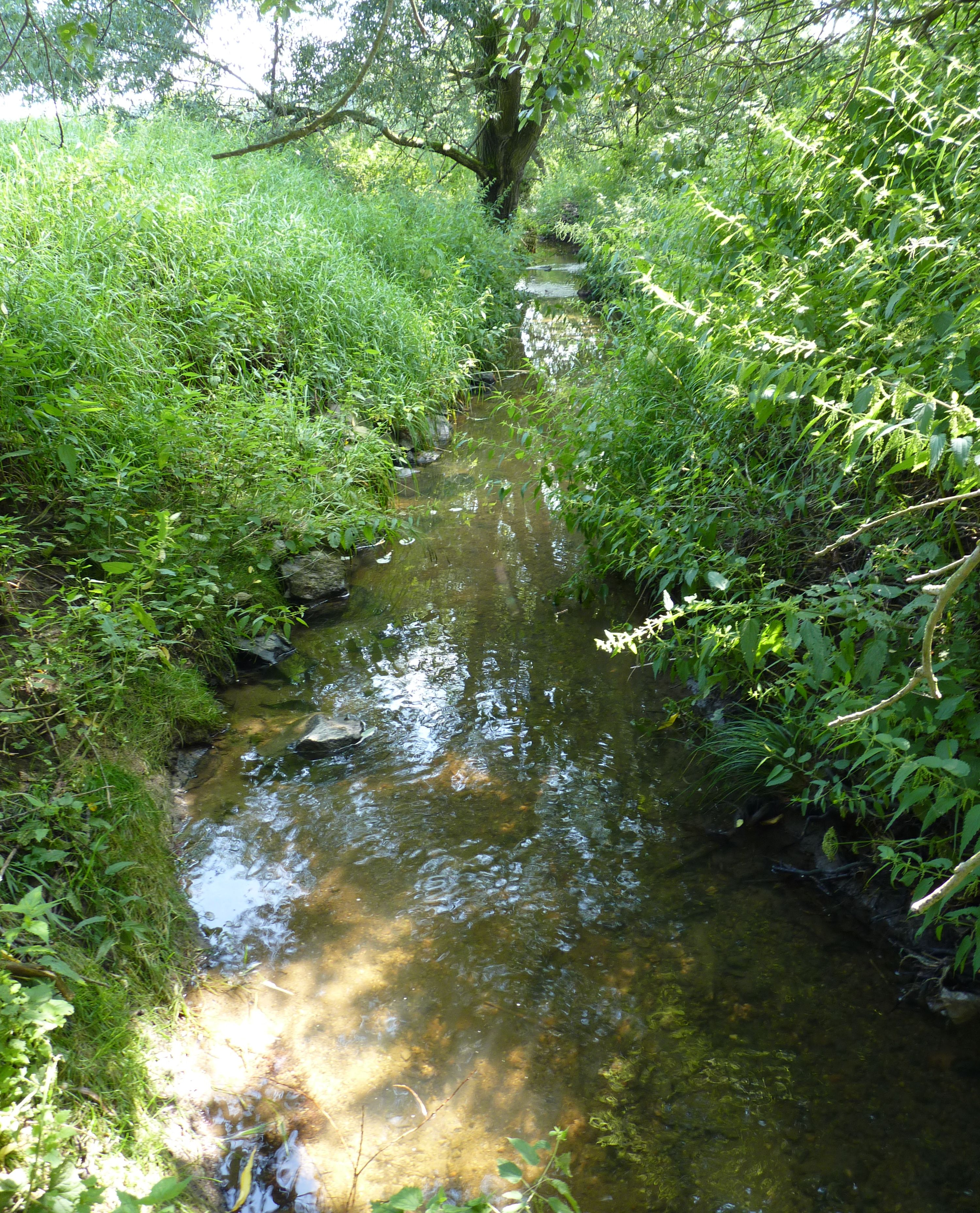

Location
- Country: Germany
- State: Saxony

Physical characteristics
- Mouth
  - location: Landwasser
  - coordinates: 50.9513°N 14.7325°E

Basin features
- Progression: Landwasser→ Mandau→ Lusatian Neisse→ Oder→ Baltic Sea

The Spitzkunnersdorfer Bach (Upper Sorbian: Spitzkunnersdorfska rěčka) is a small river of Saxony, Germany. It flows into the Landwasser in Oderwitz.

== See also ==
- List of rivers of Saxony
