= Grundwasser =

River in Germany

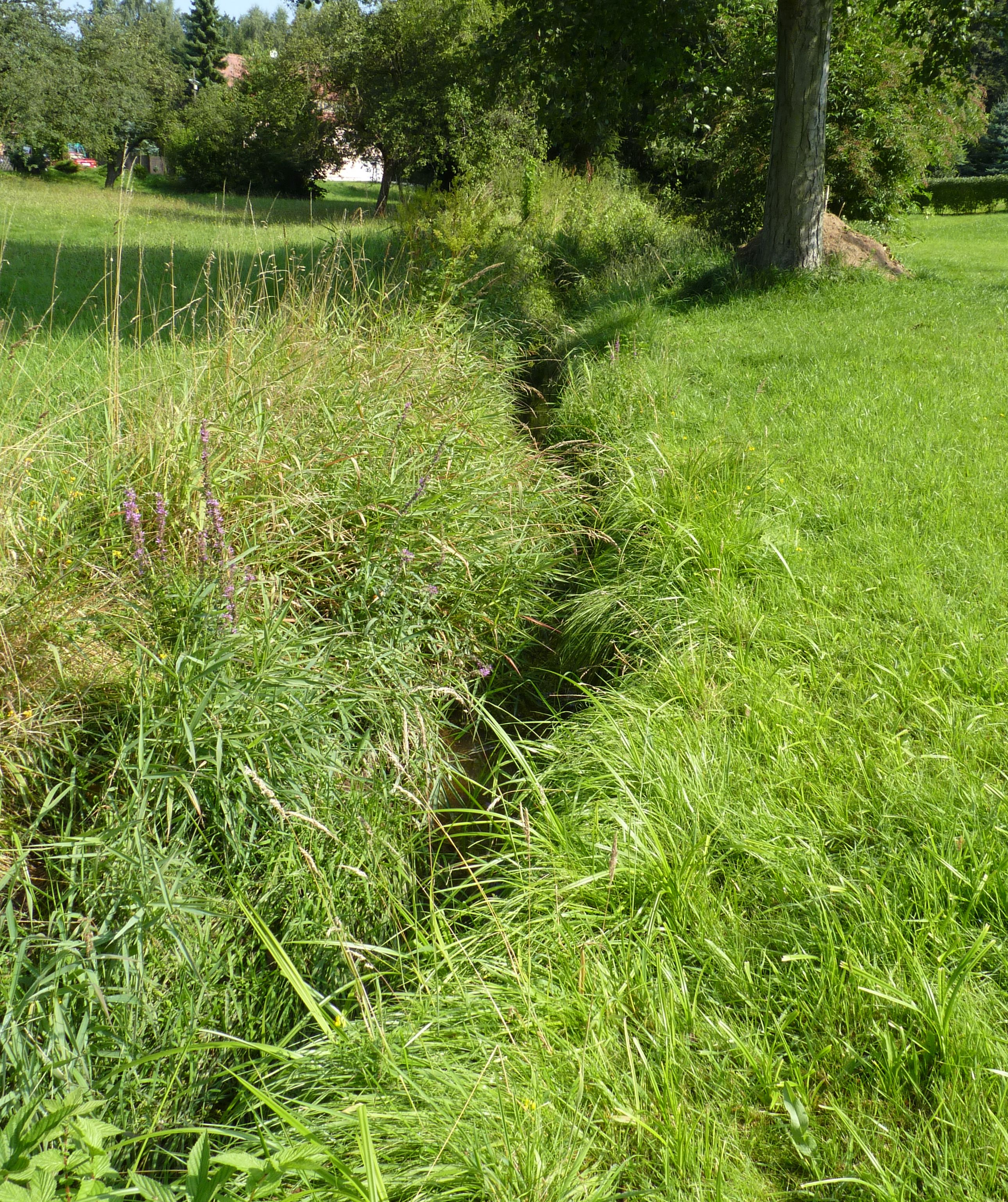
- The Grundwasser in Oderwitz

Location
- Country: Germany
- States: Saxony

Physical characteristics
- Source
  - location: Kottmar
- Mouth
  - location: Landwasser
  - coordinates: 50.9693°N 14.7114°E
- Length: 3.2 mi (5.1 km)

Basin features
- Progression: Landwasser→ Mandau→ Lusatian Neisse→ Oder→ Baltic Sea

The Grundwasser (Upper Sorbian: Dnowa woda), also called Grundbach or Hinteres Wasser (Upper Sorbian: Zadnju wodu), is a small stream of Upper Lusatia in Germany. It is a left tributary of the Landwasser, which it joins near Oderwitz. It has a length of about three miles and flows through the villages Eibau and Oderwitz.

== See also ==
- List of rivers of Saxony
