= Lužnička =

Stream in the Czech Republic and Germany

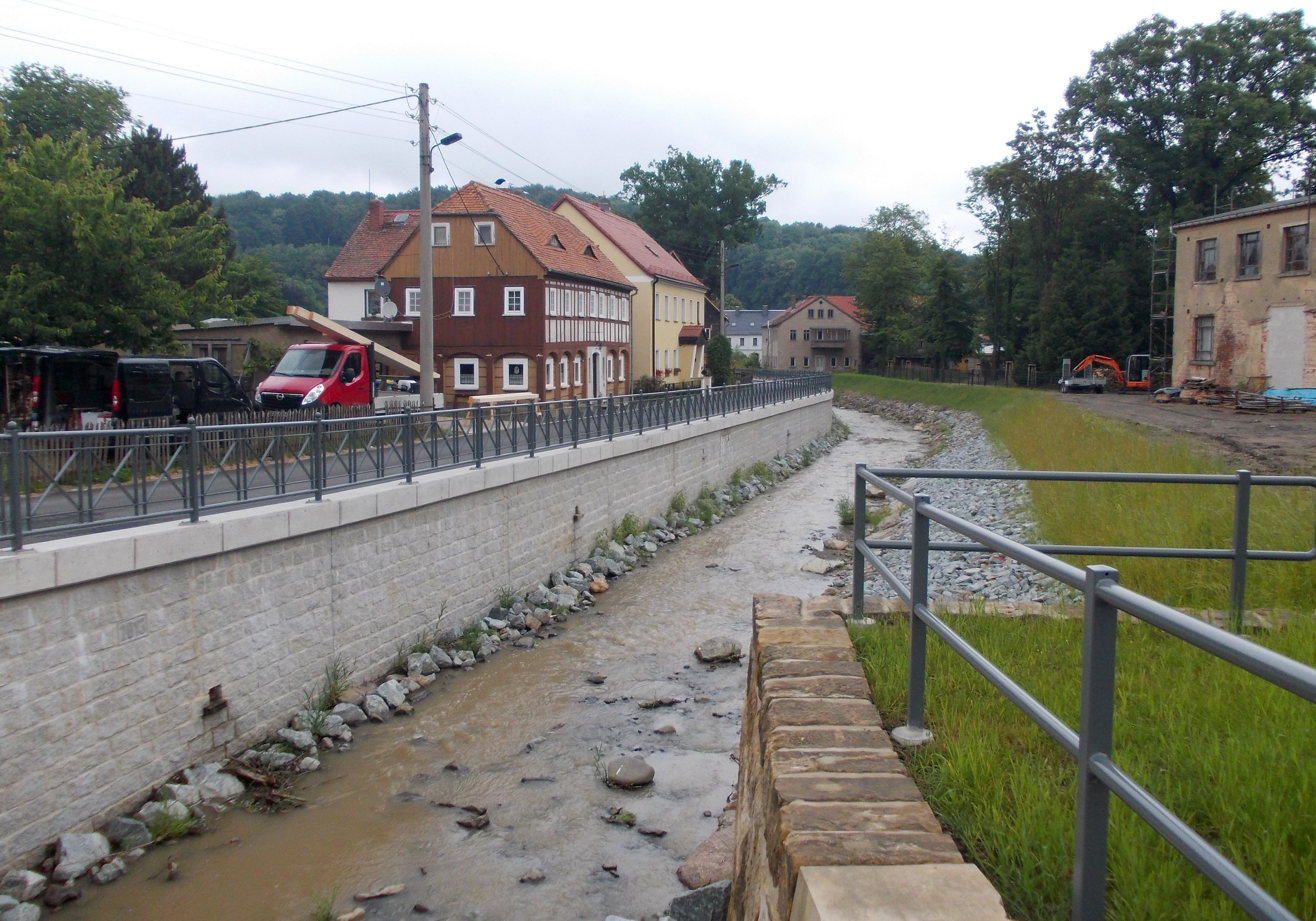
- The Lužnička in Großschönau

Location
- Countries: Czech Republic; Germany
- Regions/ States: Ústí nad Labem; Saxony

Physical characteristics
- Source
  - location: Krásná Lípa, Lusatian Mountains
  - coordinates: 50°53′44″N 14°29′40″E
  - elevation: 511 m (1,677 ft)
- Mouth
  - location: Mandau
  - coordinates: 50°53′56″N 14°39′56″E
  - elevation: 301 m (988 ft)
- Length: 15.3 km (9.5 mi)
- Basin size: 58.9 km^{2} (22.7 sq mi)
- Discharge
  - average: 0.60 m^{3}/s (21 cu ft/s) on the Czech–German border

Basin features
- Progression: Mandau→ Lusatian Neisse→ Oder→ Baltic Sea

The Lužnička (German: Lausur) is a stream in the Czech Republic and Germany, a right tributary of the Mandau River. It flows through the Ústí nad Labem Region and through Saxony. It is 15.3 km (9.5 mi) long.

== Characteristic ==
The Lužnička originates in the territory of Krásná Lípa in the Lusatian Mountains, at an elevation of 520 m (1,710 ft). It flows to Großschönau, where it merges with the Mandau River at an elevation of 301 m (988 ft). It is 15.3 km (9.5 mi) long, of which 11.9 km (7.4 mi) is in the Czech Republic. Its drainage basin has an area of 58.9 km^{2} (22.7 sq mi), of which 42.8 km^{2} (16.5 sq mi) is in the Czech Republic.

Tributaries include only small brooks. The longest tributaries of the Lužnička are:

Tributary	Length (km)	Side
Lesenský potok	4.9	right
Waltersdorfer Dorfbach	4.8	right
Matyáska	3.2	right
Malý Stožecký potok	2.6	right

== Flow ==
Most of the river bed is significantly modified and bank stabilization is carried out. The Lužnička flows through the municipal territories of Krásná Lípa, Rybniště, Horní Podluží, Dolní Podluží and Großschönau.

== Nature ==
On the upper course of the stream is built the fishpond Velký rybník. It has an area of 36 ha (89 acres). The pond and its surroundings is protected as the Velký rybník Nature Reserve on an area of 103.7 ha (256 acres). The area of wetlands, reedbeds, waterlogged meadows and wet forest is an important migration route for migratory birds. More than 170 bird species were documented there.

== See also ==
- List of rivers of the Czech Republic
- List of rivers of Saxony
