= Jedlová railway station =

Railway station in Jiřetín pod Jedlovou, Czech Republic

Coordinates: 50.8406°N 14.5683°E

Jedlová
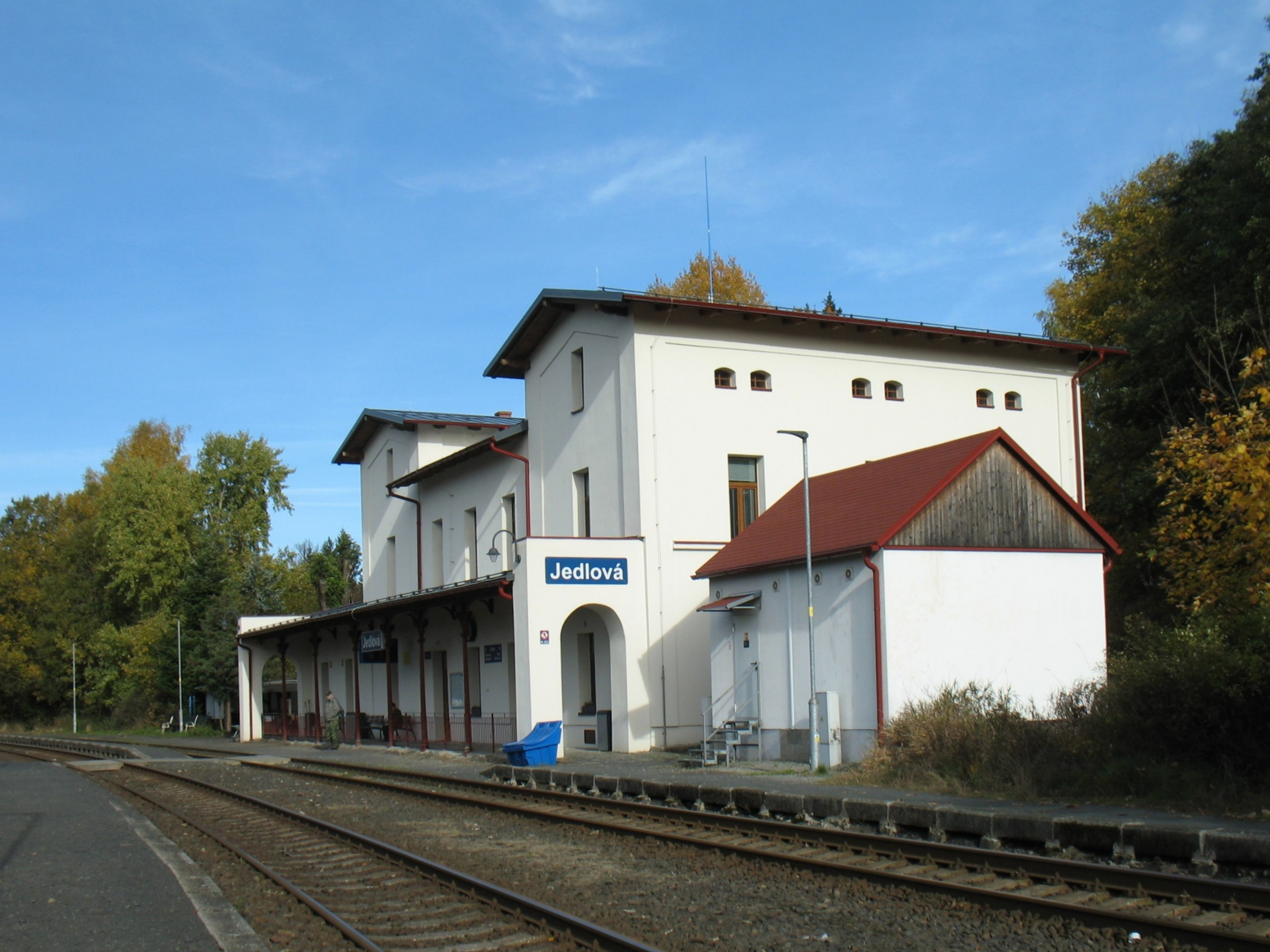

General information
- Location: Czech Republic
Location

Jedlová railway station (Czech: Jedlová) is located in the Lusatian Mountains, Czech Republic. It is situated in the middle of a forest 4 km south of the town of Jiřetín pod Jedlovou. It is a railway junction between Czech Railways lines 80 (Bakov nad Jizerou – Česká Lípa – Jedlová) and 81 (Děčín – Jedlová – Rumburk). Intercity trains from Kolín to Šluknov stop at the station.

The station building has a restaurant and serves as a tourist center for the forested area. The station often serves as a starting or end point for various excursions around the Lusatian Mountains.
