= Krásná Lípa =

- Town
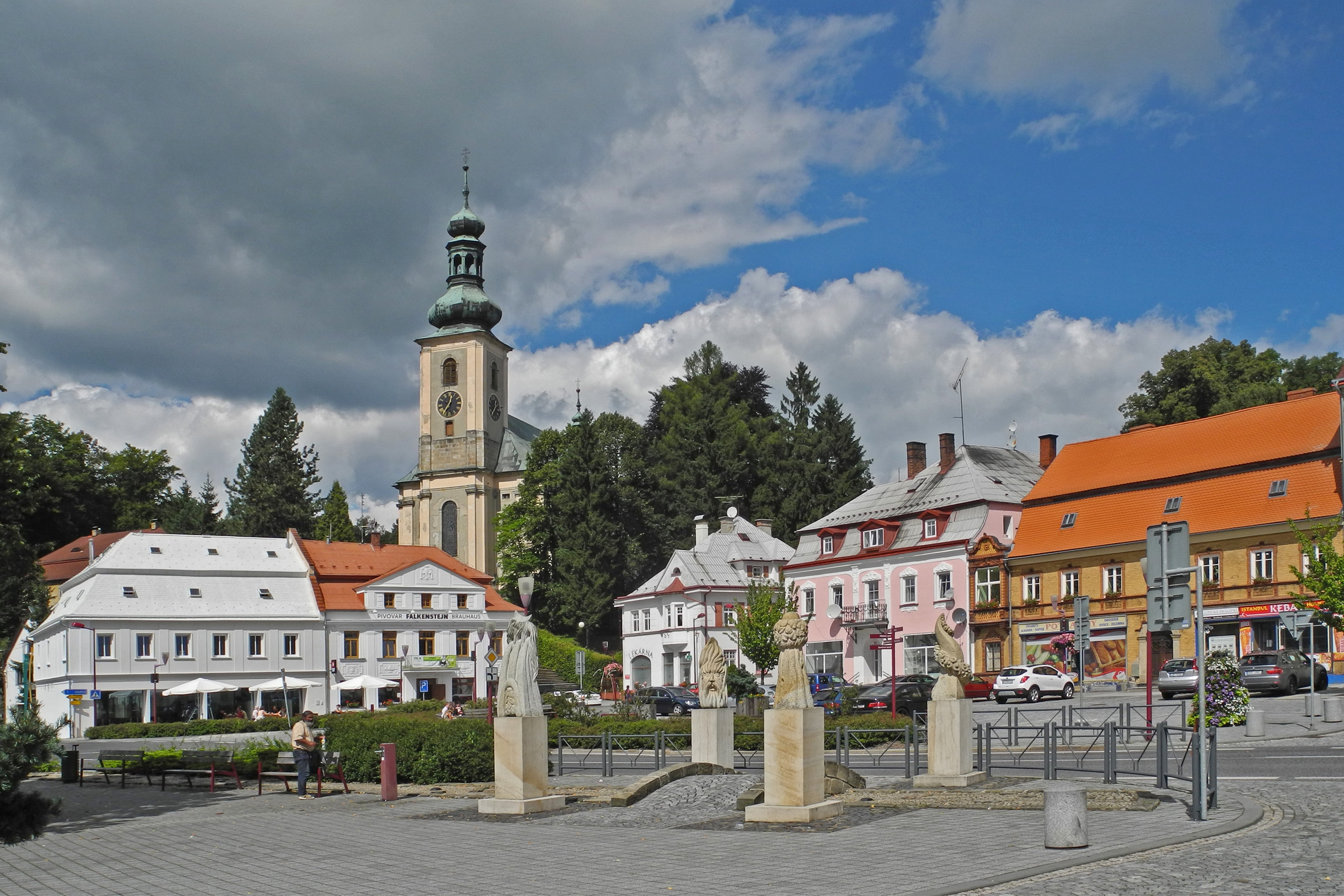
- The square Křinické náměstí with the Church of Saint Mary Magdalene

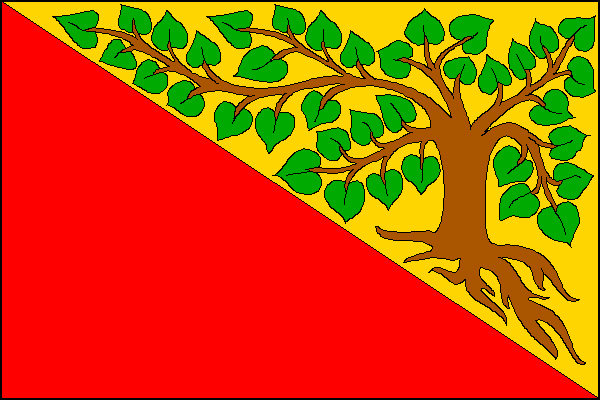
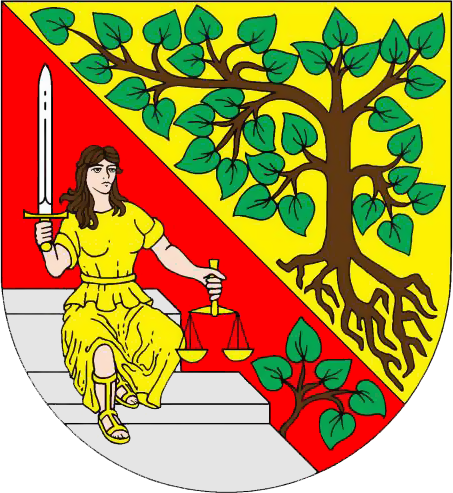
- Flag Coat of arms

- Location in the Czech Republic
- Coordinates: 50°54′48″N 14°30′32″E
- Country: Czech Republic
- Region: Ústí nad Labem
- District: Děčín
- First mentioned: 1361

Government
  - Mayor: Jan Kolář

Area
  - Total: 31.42 km^{2} (12.13 sq mi)
- Elevation: 426 m (1,398 ft)

Population (2026-01-01)
  - Total: 3,296
  - Density: 104.9/km^{2} (271.7/sq mi)
- Time zone: UTC+1 (CET)
  - Summer (DST): UTC+2 (CEST)
- Postal code: 407 46
- Website: www.krasnalipa.cz

Krásná Lípa (Czech pronunciation: [ˈkraːsnaː ˈliːpa]; German: Schönlinde) is a town in Děčín District in the Ústí nad Labem Region of the Czech Republic. It has about 3,300 inhabitants. The town is located on the border of three hilly natural regions and is a gate to the Bohemian Switzerland National Park.

Krásná Lípa was founded in the 14th century at the latest and became a town in 1870. Until World War II, it was a large town, but then the population significantly decreased.

== Administrative division ==
Krásná Lípa consists of nine municipal parts (in brackets population according to the 2021 census):

- Krásná Lípa (2,993)
- Dlouhý Důl (33)
- Hely (3)
- Kamenná Horka (46)
- Krásný Buk (90)
- Kyjov (25)
- Sněžná (31)
- Vlčí Hora (115)
- Zahrady (46)

== Etymology ==
Both the current Czech name and the historical German name Schönlinde literally mean 'beautiful linden'.

== Geography ==
Krásná Lípa is located about 25 kilometres (16 mi) northeast of Děčín and 43 km (27 mi) northeast of Ústí nad Labem. It lies on the border of three natural regions. Most of the municipal territory lies in the Lusatian Highlands, but it also extends into the Lusatian Mountains in the south and into the Elbe Sandstone Mountains in the west. The highest point is the hill Široký vrch at 586 m (1,923 ft) above sea level. The Lužnička Stream originates south of the town proper, on the slope of Široký vrch.

Krásná Lípa extends into the Bohemian Switzerland National Park in the west. The headquarters of the administration of the national park is located in the town.

== History ==
The first written mention of Krásná Lípa is from 1361. About 30 families from Upper Franconia colonised the place. Krásná Lípa belonged to the Tolštejn estate until the 16th century, when it was purchased by the Vartenberk family and joined to the Kamenice estate.

John Barnes, an English expert on textile industry, was hired in 1731 to found a spinning factory in the town. In 1731, Krásná Lípa was promoted to a market town by Emperor Charles VI. In 1870, Krásná Lípa became a town.

In 1910, the town proper reached its greatest population with 6,930 inhabitants. The expulsion of Germans in 1945–1946 reduced the population by half and more than 300 deserted houses were demolished, others dilapidated.

== Demographics ==
Historical population

Year	Pop.	±%
1869	10,068	—
1880	10,221	+1.5%
1890	10,495	+2.7%
1900	10,235	−2.5%
1910	10,174	−0.6%

Year	Pop.	±%
1921	8,600	−15.5%
1930	9,385	+9.1%
1950	4,368	−53.5%
1961	4,308	−1.4%
1970	3,938	−8.6%

Year	Pop.	±%
1980	3,819	−3.0%
1991	3,381	−11.5%
2001	3,639	+7.6%
2011	3,490	−4.1%
2021	3,382	−3.1%

Source: Censuses

== Transport ==
Krásná Lípa is located on two railway lines: Kolín–Rumburk and Děčín–Rumburk.

== Sights ==
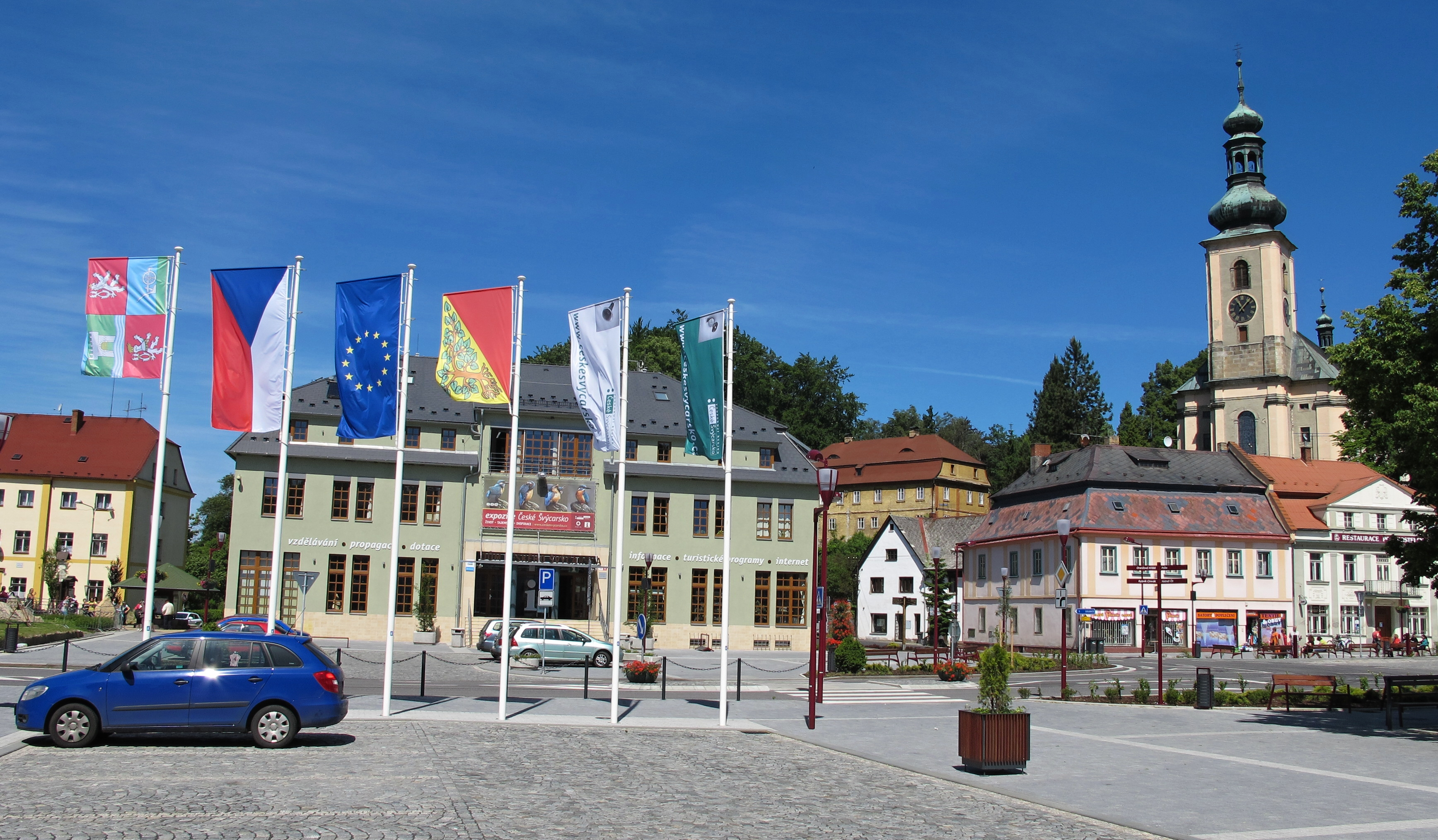
Bohemian Switzerland House on the town square

The Church of Saint Mary Magdalene is a late Baroque building from 1754, which replaced an older church. In 1777, the tower was built, and in 1816–1818, the extensive staircase in front of the church was built.

The town hall is a Neo-Renaissance building with Art Nouveau elements built in 1899–1900, originally as the seat of the savings bank.

The Bohemian Switzerland House is a tourist information office with an exposition dedicated to Bohemian Switzerland.

The folk architecture in the village of Dlouhý Důl is well preserved and is protected as a village monument zone. The houses form a preserved compact set of original mostly half-timbered houses.

== Notable people ==
- Anthony Heinrich (1781–1861), composer and violinist
- Johann Münzberg (1799–1878), textile manufacturer
- Kurt Marschner (1913–1984), opera singer
- Manfred Preußger (born 1932), German athlete
- Gerhard Mitter (1935–1969), German racecar driver

== Twin towns – sister cities ==
Krásná Lípa is twinned with:

- Kottmar, Germany
- Práznovce, Slovakia
- Sebnitz, Germany
- Żyrardów, Poland
