= Johann Münzberg =

Bohemian textile entrepreneur

- Born: 3 August 1799; Schönlinde, Bohemia
- Died: 1 September 1878 (aged 79); Libotschan, Bohemia
- Occupation: industrialist
- Organization(s): Textilwerke Johann Münzberg & Co.
- Awards: Order of Franz Joseph

Johann Münzberg (3 August 1799 – 1 September 1878) was an industrialist in Austrian-era Bohemia. His textile factories, Textilwerke Johann Münzberg & Co., were at the time leading companies in Bohemia. He was also influential in the building of the Empress Elisabeth Bridge across the Elbe at Tetschen, a railway, a brewery on his estate in Libotschan, schools and a savings bank.

== Life ==
Münzberg was born on 3 August 1799 in Schönlinde, Bohemia, the son of Johann Gottfried Lorenz Münzberg (1758–1824) who had founded a textile factory for calico print, twine and linen in 1786.

Münzberg trained as a weaver and first worked in his father's factory. He gained experience as a journeyman and merchant in Rumburg and Georgswalde. In 1828 he and his brother Josef Münzberg (1794–1867) founded a cotton spinning mill, Theresienau, in Altstadt near Tetschen. It developed into an important group of companies. After further foundations and takeovers, the factories, under the name Textilwerke Johann Münzberg & Co., had more than 60,000 spindles in 1876 and were thus the most important company in the industry in Bohemia. Münzberg was called the Spinner King (Spinnerkönig).

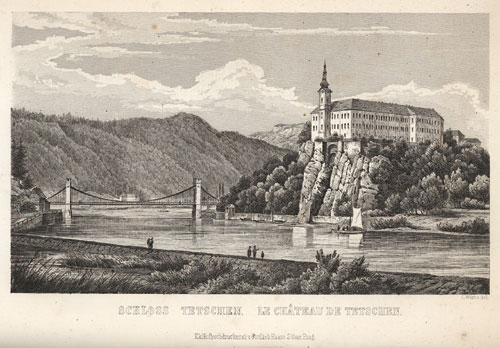
Empress Elisabeth Bridge in Tetschen

Münzberg also founded a brewery on his estate in Libotschan and participated in the establishment of a sugar factory in Saaz. He supported the construction of a new bridge across the Elbe in Tetschen. The chain bridge was opened in 1855 as the Empress Elisabeth Bridge and connected Tetschen to the railway from Dresden to Prague. Münzberg supported the construction of the Böhmische Nordbahn railway as well as the establishment of schools and a savings bank in Tetschen. In 1848 and 1849 he was entitled to print emergency money (Notgeld).

Münzberg's descendants continued to run the textile businesses, but many factories became unprofitable and were therefore shut down or taken over by Czech entrepreneurs. The factory in Bensen-Eleonorenhain remained family-owned until 1945.

Münzberg was awarded the Order of Franz Joseph. He died at the Libotschan estate on 1 September 1878.
