= Gustav Merkel =

German organist and composer

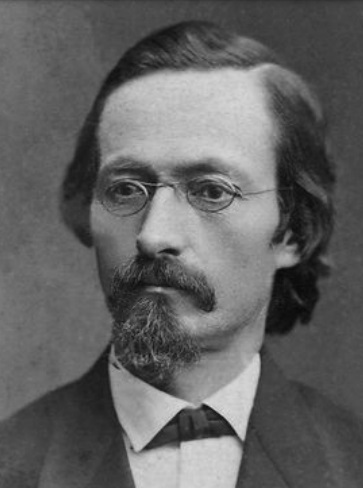

Background information
- Born: November 12, 1827; Oberoderwitz, Kingdom of Saxony
- Died: October 30, 1885 (aged 57) Dresden, Kingdom of Saxony
- Genres: Classical
- Occupations: Organist, composer
- Years active: 1858–1885

Gustav Adolf Merkel (November 12, 1827, Oberoderwitz, Kingdom of Saxony – October 30, 1885, Dresden) was a German organist and composer.

Having been given some lessons by Schumann in his youth, Merkel spent most of his career in Dresden, concentrating on organ-playing from 1858. A Lutheran himself, he nevertheless held an appointment at the Catholic Church of the Court of Saxony from 1864 until his death. During the same period he taught the organ at Dresden's Conservatory.

His compositions include nine organ sonatas (which have been recorded several times, as well as occurring quite often in organ recitals), of which the first sonata (Op.30) is written for two organists, and several dozen miniatures (some of them based on Protestant chorale melodies). In these works, his style is broadly conservative, very much influenced by Mendelssohn, and with similarities to the output of his younger contemporary Josef Rheinberger. He also produced choral and piano pieces; his salon piece "Schmetterling" ("Butterfly"), Op. 81, No. 4 is particularly well-known.
