= Rybniště =

- Municipality
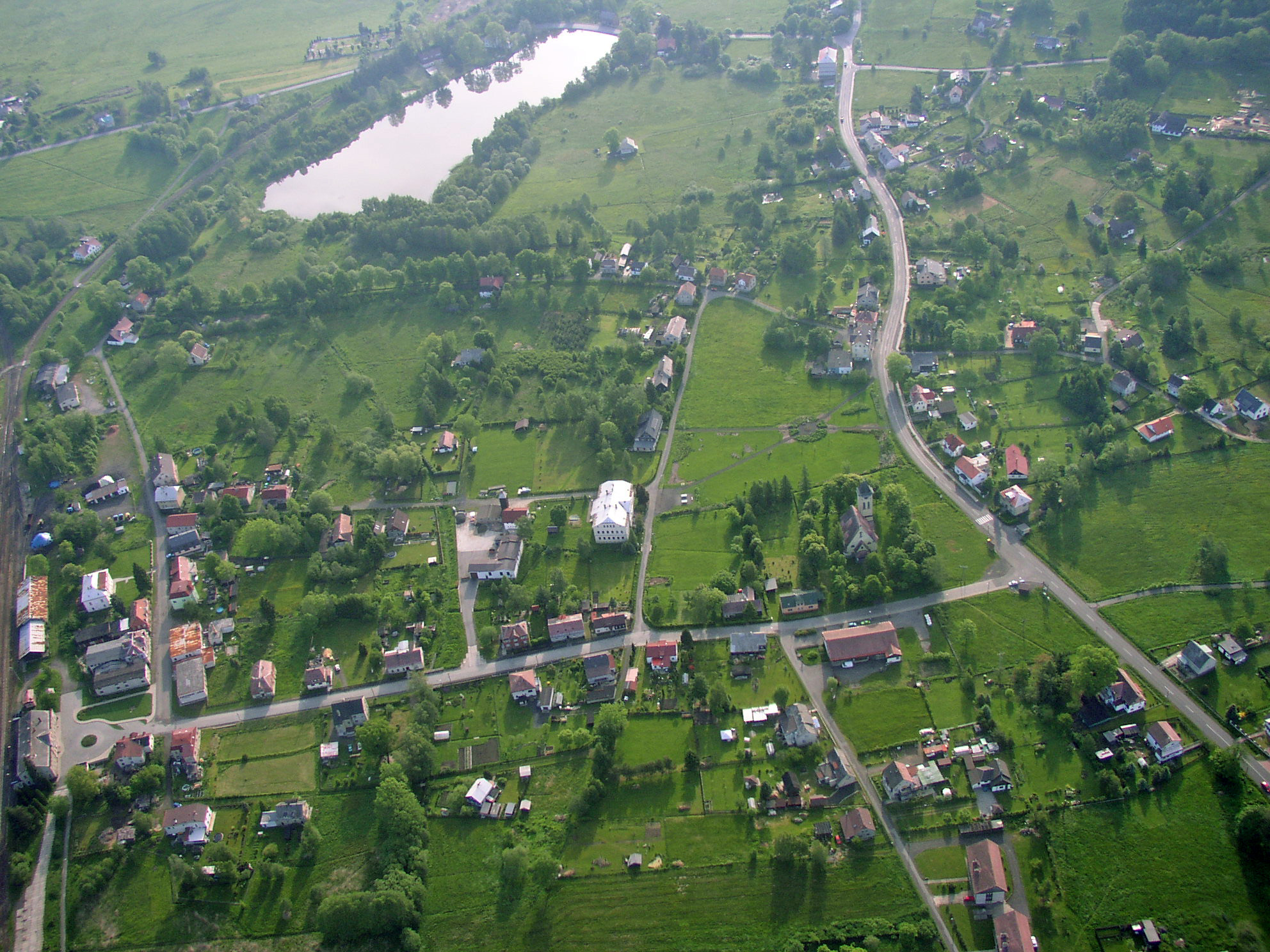
- Eastern part of Rybniště

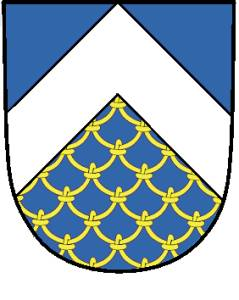
- Flag Coat of arms

- Location in the Czech Republic
- Coordinates: 50°52′48″N 14°30′55″E
- Country: Czech Republic
- Region: Ústí nad Labem
- District: Děčín
- First mentioned: 1715

Area
  - Total: 12.67 km^{2} (4.89 sq mi)
- Elevation: 460 m (1,510 ft)

Population (2026-01-01)
  - Total: 728
  - Density: 57.5/km^{2} (149/sq mi)
- Time zone: UTC+1 (CET)
  - Summer (DST): UTC+2 (CEST)
- Postal code: 407 51
- Website: www.obecrybniste.cz

Rybniště (German: Teichstatt) is a municipality and village in Děčín District in the Ústí nad Labem Region of the Czech Republic. It has about 700 inhabitants.

== Administrative division ==
Rybniště consists of two municipal parts (in brackets population according to the 2021 census):

- Rybniště (574)
- Nová Chřibská (94)

== Etymology ==
The initial German name Teichstadt (later written as Teichstatt) means 'pond town'. The Czech name is a free translation of the German name (from rybník = 'pond').

== Geography ==
Rybniště is located about 23 kilometres (14 mi) northeast of Děčín and 41 km (25 mi) northeast of Ústí nad Labem. It lies on the border between the Lusatian Mountains and Lusatian Highlands. The highest point is the mountain Malý Stožec at 659 m (2,162 ft) above sea level. The Lužnička Stream flows through the northern part of the municipality. A significant body of water is the fishpond Velký rybník, supplied by the Lužnička.

== History ==
A historical part of Rybniště is Nová Chřibská. The first written mention of Nová Chřibská (under the name Chřibská Nová Ves) is from 1475. It belonged to the Tolštejn estate until 1573, and then it was bought by the Vartenberk family and annexed to the Česká Kamenice estate. The first written mention of Rybniště is from 1715, when it was described as a settlement formed on the site of a drained and dried pond. Rybniště and Nová Chřibská were administratively merged in 1805.

== Demographics ==
Historical population

Year	Pop.	±%
1869	2,191	—
1880	2,263	+3.3%
1890	2,461	+8.7%
1900	2,329	−5.4%
1910	2,358	+1.2%

Year	Pop.	±%
1921	2,127	−9.8%
1930	2,424	+14.0%
1950	1,063	−56.1%
1961	1,135	+6.8%
1970	1,075	−5.3%

Year	Pop.	±%
1980	871	−19.0%
1991	668	−23.3%
2001	709	+6.1%
2011	662	−6.6%
2021	668	+0.9%

Source: Censuses

== Transport ==
Rybniště is located on the railway lines Děčín–Rumburk and Mladá Boleslav–Rumburk.

== Sights ==
The main landmark of Rybniště is the Church of Saint Joseph. It was built in 1911–1912 and belongs to the youngest churches in the region. It is one of the few Art Nouveau churches in the Czech Republic.
