= Dolní Podluží =

- Municipality
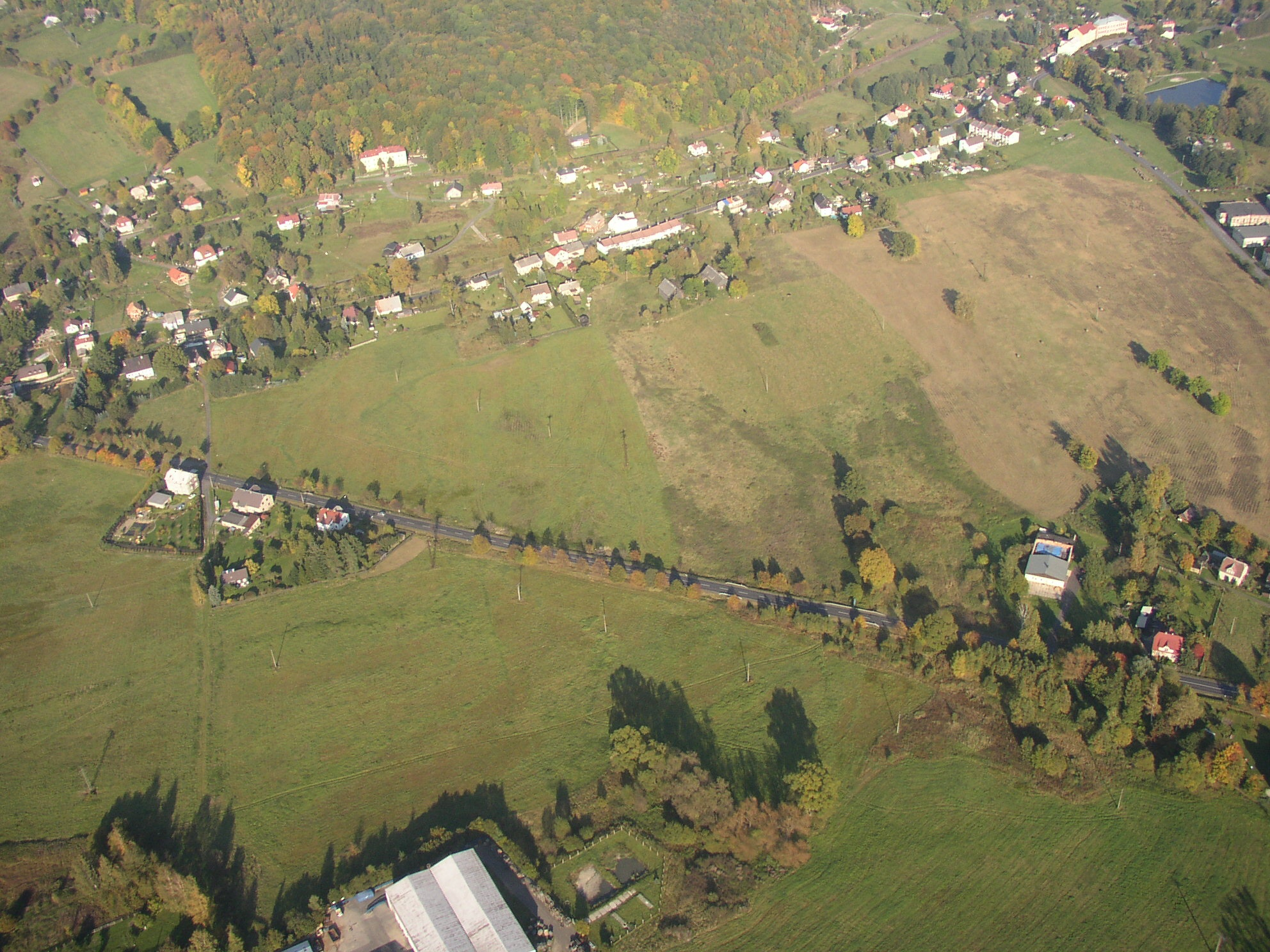
- Aerial view of Dolní Podluží

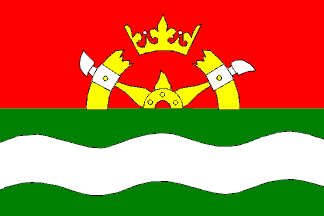
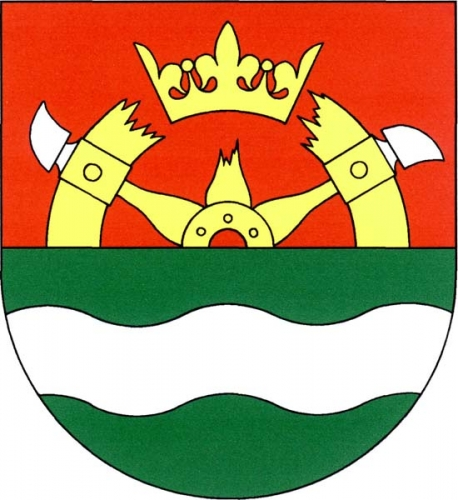
- Flag Coat of arms

- Location in the Czech Republic
- Coordinates: 50°52′48″N 14°35′43″E
- Country: Czech Republic
- Region: Ústí nad Labem
- District: Děčín
- First mentioned: 1378

Area
  - Total: 15.18 km^{2} (5.86 sq mi)
- Elevation: 370 m (1,210 ft)

Population (2026-01-01)
  - Total: 1,162
  - Density: 76.55/km^{2} (198.3/sq mi)
- Time zone: UTC+1 (CET)
  - Summer (DST): UTC+2 (CEST)
- Postal code: 407 55
- Website: www.dolnipodluzi.cz

Dolní Podluží (until 1947 Dolní Grunt; German: Niedergrund) is a municipality and village in Děčín District in the Ústí nad Labem Region of the Czech Republic. It has about 1,200 inhabitants.

== Administrative division ==
Dolní Podluží consists of three municipal parts (in brackets population according to the 2021 census):

- Dolní Podluží (1,089)
- Kateřina (95)
- Světliny 2.díl (1)

== Etymology ==
The initial name of the village was Grunt. The name was derived from the German word Grund (here meaning 'valley') and referred to the location of the village.

In 1947, the municipality was renamed from Dolní Grunt to its current name. The word Podluží translates as 'area below the Lusatian Mountains'.

== Geography ==
Dolní Podluží is located about 29 kilometres (18 mi) northeast of Děčín and 45 km (28 mi) northeast of Ústí nad Labem, on the border with Germany. The northern part of the municipal territory with the built-up area lies in the Lusatian Highlands. The southern part lies in the Lusatian Mountains and in the eponymous protected landscape area. The highest point is the mountain Pěnkavčí vrch at 792 m (2,598 ft) above sea level. The Lužnička Stream flows through the municipality.

== History ==
The first written mention of Dolní Podluží is from 1485, under the name Grunt. The village was later divided into two parts, Dolní Grunt ('lower Grunt') and Horní Grunt ('upper Grunt'; today Horní Podluží). Dolní Grunt was first mentioned in 1566. Between 1681 and 1850, it was a property of the Liechtenstein family as a part of the Rumburk estate.

== Demographics ==
Historical population

Year	Pop.	±%
1869	2,736	—
1880	3,178	+16.2%
1890	3,257	+2.5%
1900	3,389	+4.1%
1910	3,485	+2.8%

Year	Pop.	±%
1921	3,212	−7.8%
1930	3,504	+9.1%
1950	1,966	−43.9%
1961	1,794	−8.7%
1970	1,616	−9.9%

Year	Pop.	±%
1980	1,469	−9.1%
1991	1,244	−15.3%
2001	1,201	−3.5%
2011	1,128	−6.1%
2021	1,185	+5.1%

Source: Censuses

== Transport ==
Dolní Podluží is located on the railway line Děčín–Varnsdorf.

== Sights ==
The most valuable building of Dolní Podluží is the Church of Saint Catherine. The first church was in Dolní Podluží already in the 14th century, and in 1411 it was replaced by a new wooden building. The current brick church was built in the Renaissance style in 1548. In 1720–1734 and in the 19th century, it underwent significant reconstructions and acquired a Baroque character.
