= Empress Elisabeth Bridge =

Historic bridge over the Elbe

Empress Elisabeth Bridge Kaiserin-Elisabeth-Brücke
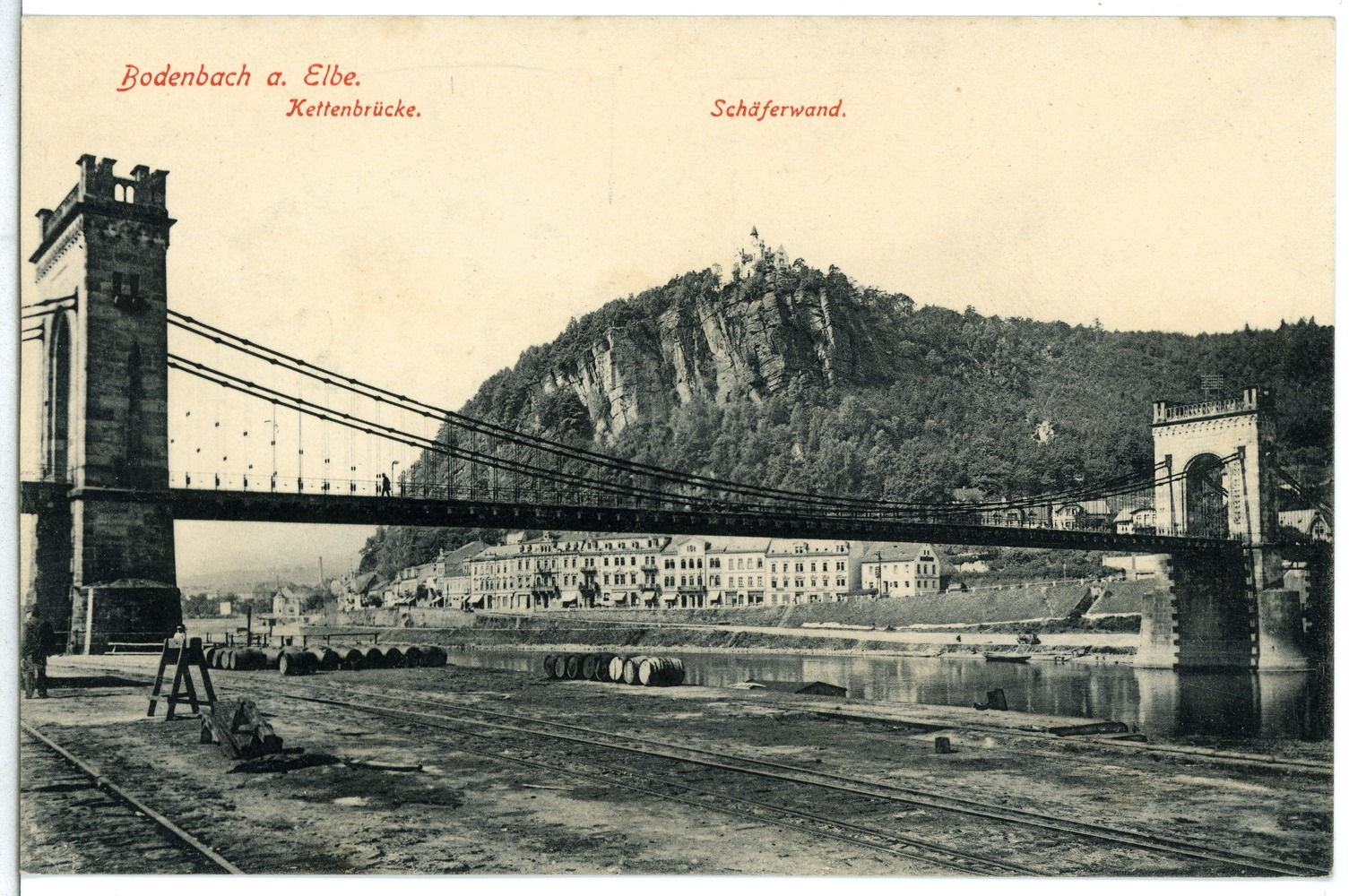
- The chain bridge on a 1910 postcard
- Coordinates: 50°46′52″N 14°12′28″E
- Crossed: Elbe
- Locale: Tetschen (today: Děčín)
- Other name: Kettenbrücke

Characteristics
- Design: Chain bridge
- Total length: 235 metres (771 ft)
- Width: 8.5 metres (28 ft)

History
- Construction end: 1855
- Destroyed: 1930s
- Replaced by: Tyrš Bridge 50°46′52″N 14°12′28″E

Location
- Interactive map of Empress Elisabeth Bridge

The Empress Elisabeth Bridge (German: Kaiserin-Elisabeth-Brücke) was a chain bridge that spanned the Elbe between Tetschen (now Děčín) on the east bank with Bodenbach in northern Bohemia. It was opened in 1855, named after Empress Elisabeth of Austria, and connected Tetschen to the major railroad from Dresden to Prague. The bridge was demolished in the early 1930s, but its piers were used for the modern bridge replacing it.

== History ==
When a railway line was opened connecting Dresden and Prague on the west bank of the Elbe in 1851, it became commercially vital for Tetschen on the east bank of the river to be connected to the station in Bodenbach. Local entrepreneurs, textile manufacturer Johann Münzberg, and Count Franz Anton von Thun, promoted the building of a bridge. They founded a stock company, and Thun provided a section of his garden for the bridge head. The bridge was built from 1853 to 1855, by Firma Schertz from Pirna using designs by Werner, an engineer who modified the original design of Josef Schnirch. When it was opened in 1855, it was the only chain bridge over the Elbe. It had a length of 235 metres (771 ft) and was 8.5 metres (28 ft) wide. It was named after Elisabeth of Austria, who had become Empress on her marriage to Emperor Franz Joseph I in 1854. The bridge was regarded as one of the greatest and most beautiful bridges in Bohemia, and was favorably compared to the Széchenyi Chain Bridge in Budapest.

On 8 July 1915, a fire on the bridge damaged the timber planks of the construction. The bridge could not be used but was restored to service after many months. On 1 July 1917, Austria took over the responsibility of the bridge from Tetschen, and promised to pay the shareholders of the Kettenbrücken-Aktiengesellschaft, which had financed the building, restoration, and maintenance. However, only the first installment was paid on 1 January 1918, because then Austria-Hungary was dissolved and the Czechoslovak Republic founded. Repair was funded by the state in 1919, and more in the following years. The bridge, largely built from wood, was hard to maintain and no longer fit for growing traffic. It was demolished in the early 1930s, and replaced in 1933 by a new bridge which retained the original pier footings. It is named the Tyrš Bridge (Tyršův most) after Miroslav Tyrš.

== See also ==
- Elisabeth Bridge (Budapest) (also named after the Empress)
