= Jiřetín pod Jedlovou =

- Municipality
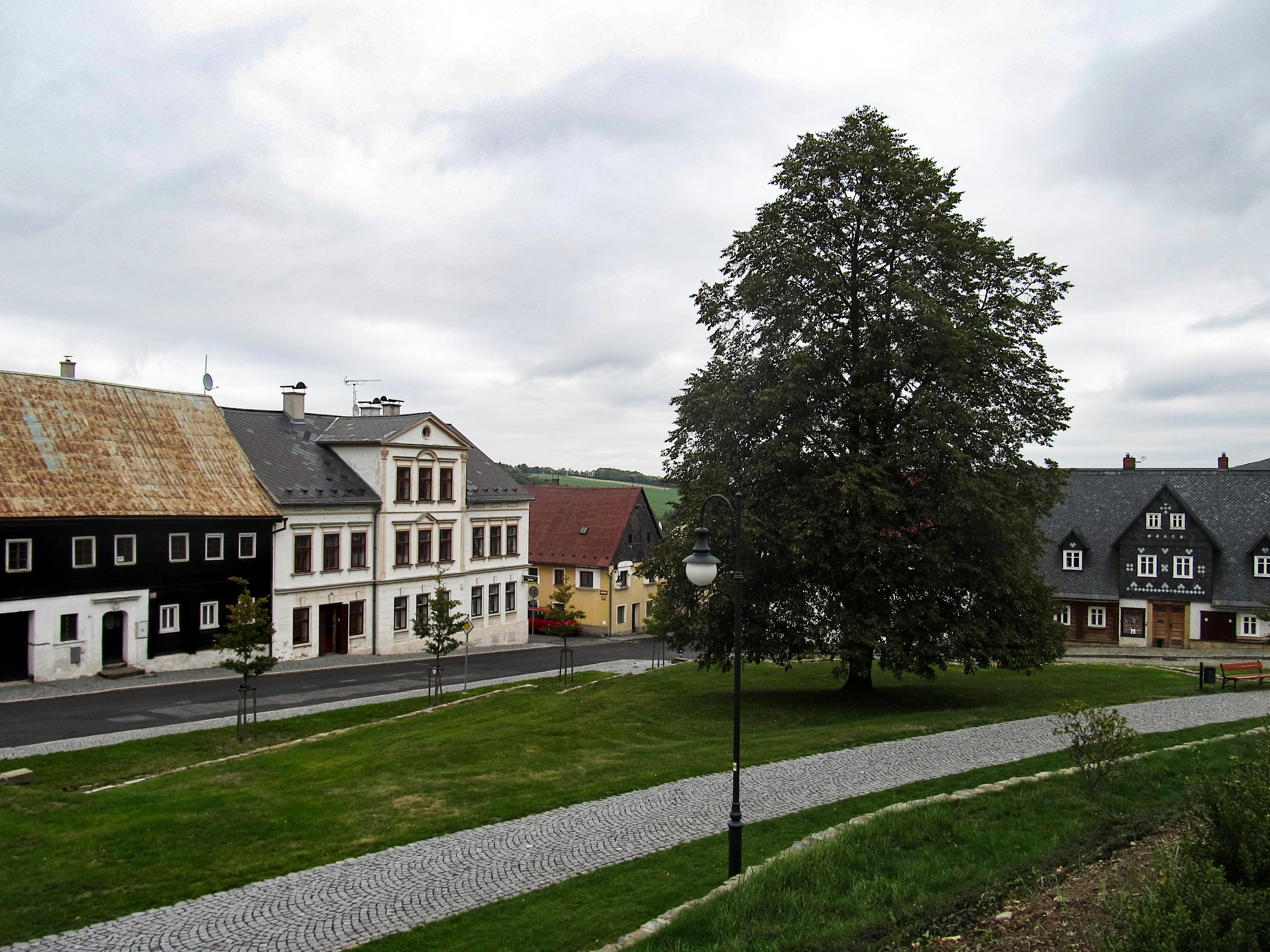
- The square Náměstí Jiřího

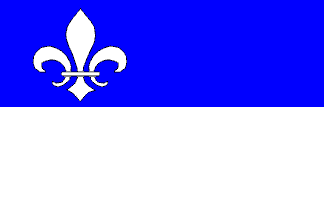
- Flag Coat of arms

- Location in the Czech Republic
- Coordinates: 50°52′28″N 14°34′31″E
- Country: Czech Republic
- Region: Ústí nad Labem
- District: Děčín
- Founded: 1539

Area
  - Total: 11.37 km^{2} (4.39 sq mi)
- Elevation: 458 m (1,503 ft)

Population (2026-01-01)
  - Total: 638
  - Density: 56.1/km^{2} (145/sq mi)
- Time zone: UTC+1 (CET)
  - Summer (DST): UTC+2 (CEST)
- Postal code: 407 56
- Website: www.jiretin.cz

Jiřetín pod Jedlovou (Czech pronunciation: [ˈjɪr̝ɛciːn ˈpod jɛdlovou]; German: Sankt Georgenthal) is a municipality and village in Děčín District in the Ústí nad Labem Region of the Czech Republic. It has about 600 inhabitants. The town is located on the border between the Lusatian Mountains and Lusatian Highlands.

Jiřetín pod Jedlovou was founded in 1539 as a mining settlement. The historic centre with the area of Křížová hora is well preserved and is protected as an urban monument zone.

== Administrative division ==
Jiřetín pod Jedlovou consists of four municipal parts (in brackets population according to the 2021 census):

- Jiřetín pod Jedlovou (639)
- Jedlová (4)
- Lesné (10)
- Rozhled (29)

== Etymology ==
The original German name of Jiřetín pod Jedlovou was Sankt Georgenthal, which translates as "Saint George's Valley". The municipality was founded in 1539 by Georg of Schleinitz (Czech: Jiří ze Šlejnic), therefore it was entrusted to the protection of Saint George and was named after its patron. The Czech name was created in 1949 from the name of Jiří according to older Czech geographic names. After 1945, the municipality was called Svatý Jiřetín ('Saint Jiřetín') for a short period of time. In 1949, the municipality got a distinction pod Jedlovou ('below Jedlová') to distinguish it from other places named Jiřetín.

== Geography ==
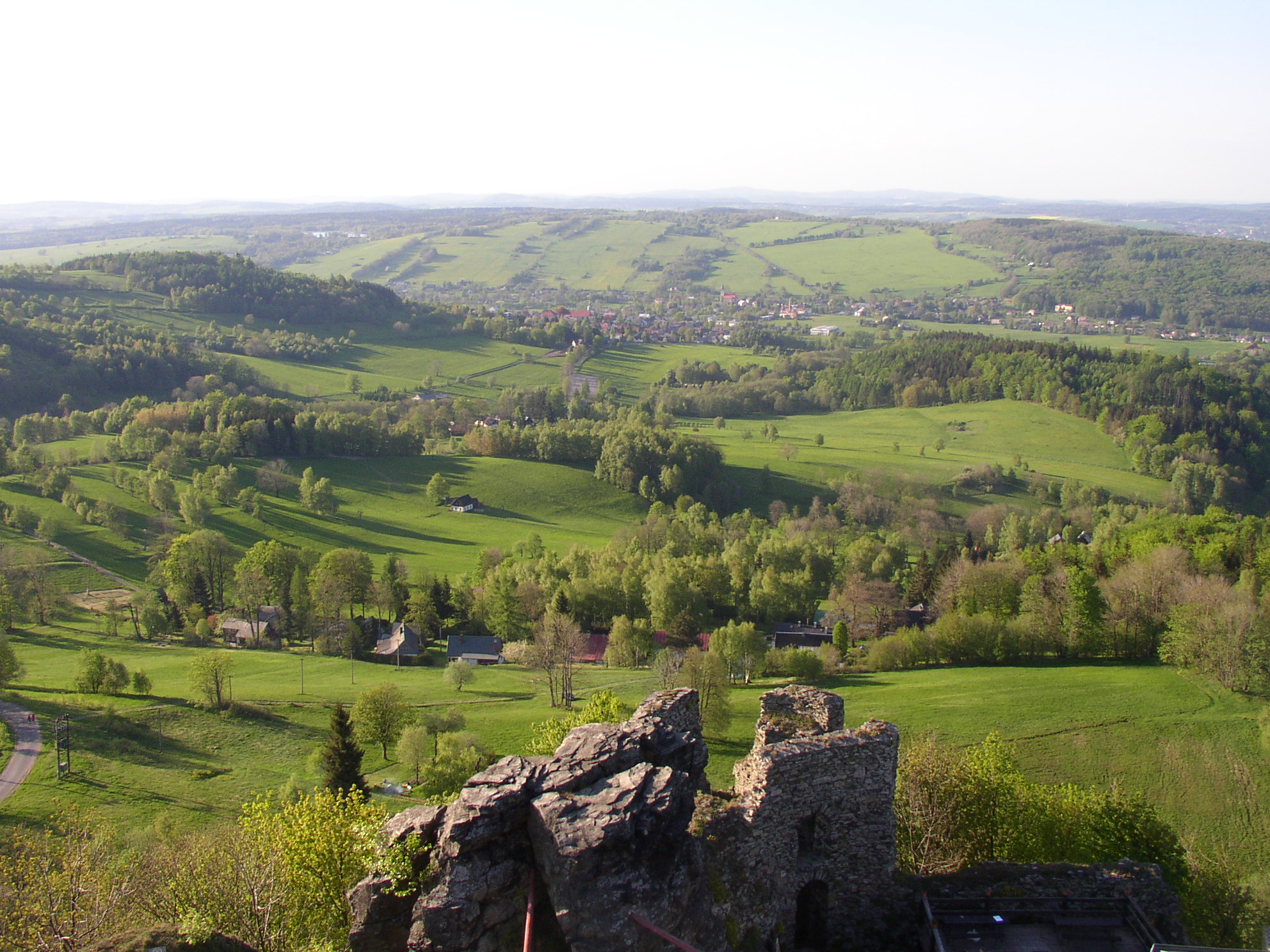
View of Jiřetín pod Jedlovou from Tolštejn

Jiřetín pod Jedlovou is located about 27 kilometres (17 mi) northeast of Děčín and 44 km (27 mi) northeast of Ústí nad Labem. It lies mostly in the Lusatian Mountains and in the Lužické hory Protected Landscape Area. The northern part of the municipal territory extends into the Lusatian Highlands. The highest point is the mountain Jedlová at 774 m (2,539 ft) above sea level.

== History ==
Reflections on the Slavic settlement of this region since the end of the 6th century are merely fiction, and have no real basis. In 1509, King Vladislaus II gave the Tolštejn estate the right to exploit gold, silver, copper, lead, tin, and iron for twenty years. Mining attempts were first carried out in the Sýkoří valley below Tolštejn and in the Milířka valley in the Dolní Podluží territory.

=== Town foundation ===
The oldest documents of settlement around Jiřetín are medieval glassworks. The closest dated glassworks are located south of the village of Lesné in the Dolní Podluží territory. Others are located in the middle of the Rozhled settlement opposite the resort of Slovan. The existence of the ironworks was dated to the end of the 13th century.

According to available data, Jiřetín was founded in 1539, when a place was selected, and from 1548 to 1553 the mining town was set to a regular rectangular floor plan. The town was built on an old Leipzig road that lined the eastern edge of the small town. The town of Jiřetín belongs to a group of upper towns, founded along the Saxony border. The base of Jiřetín is the exact square of the square from which the regular orthogonal network of streets unfolded. Central streets did not have a transit character, which was not at the expense of transportation availability. The long distance route was on the eastern edge of the town. Along the square and the streets were square quadratic blocks, each of which had three houses. Although all the houses in the town were wooden, it was never completely destroyed for this reason.

=== 16th century ===
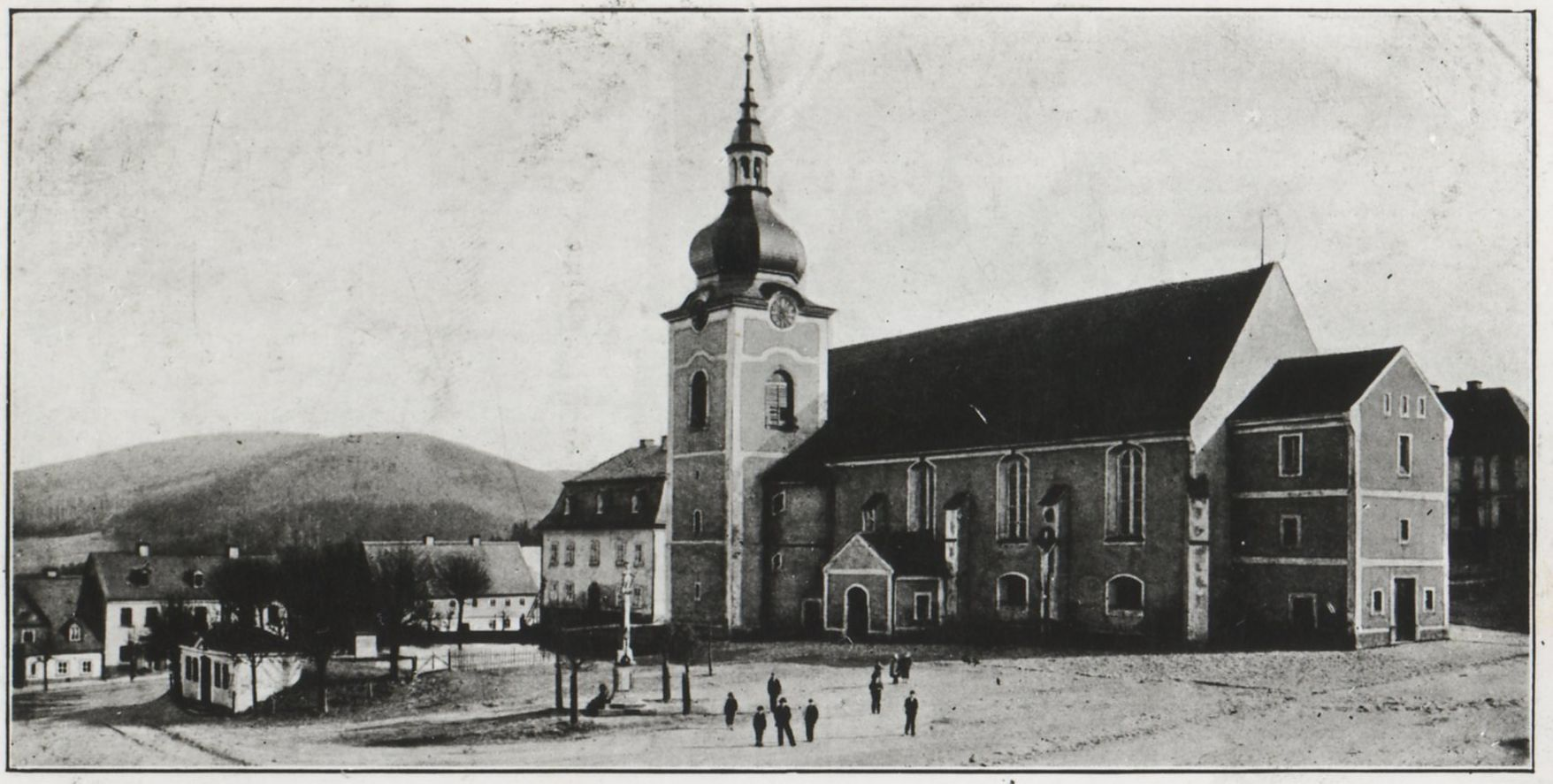
Local church at the turn of the 19th and 20th centuries

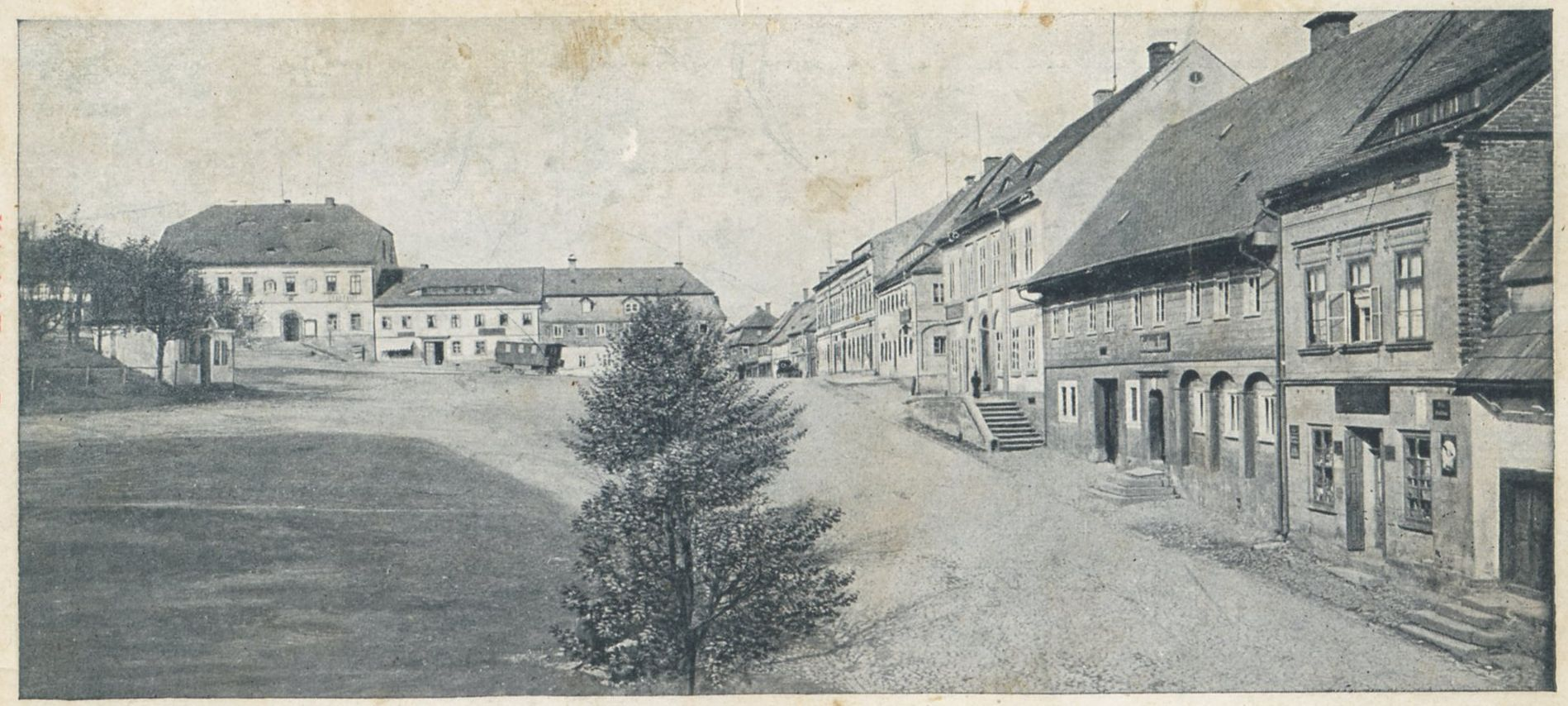
The square Náměstí Jiřího at the turn of the 19th and 20th centuries

The initial development of the town was influenced by the numerous advantages that arose from the founding privilege put together by Georg of Schleinitz on 12 November 1554. The town had the usual basic rights; all homeowners were given the right to brew beer and sell it according to the Rumburk brewing right, the right to care for, bread, and slaughter cattle, the freedom to trade and manage craft. They have been freed from all other dominion and customs. They had the right to vote for the town council, Purkmistr, and town government officials, even though the nobility insisted on their approval. The inhabitants of the town did not receive any land, only those on which their houses stood. However, they had the right to a free reference of their property and, above all, the privilege of free movement, which meant they had the right to leave and return to Jiřetín. The privileges allowed a successful urban life to ensure successful mining. The main mining work in the 16th century was the hereditary adit of Saint Christopher, its entrance can be seen in front of the house of Jiřetín No. 252 in Křížová Street. The support of the authority was not limitless, a conditional extension of the mining privilege was envisaged. The privilege was extended in 1569 for another 15 years and in 1584 for another three years. Soon, however, mining fell. At the time of limiting mining activities, the estate was property of the law. In 1587, the inhabitants of the town were subject to salaries and duties. On 18 December 1587, the town was granted town privileges by Emperor Rudolf II. The town's privileges included two annual markets, St. George's (24 April), and St. Martin's (11 November). In 1599, a plague epidemic broke out in the town, which killed 300 people.

Hopes and prayers for ore deposits did not meet expectations. The path to life security led to guilds.

=== 17th–20th centuries ===
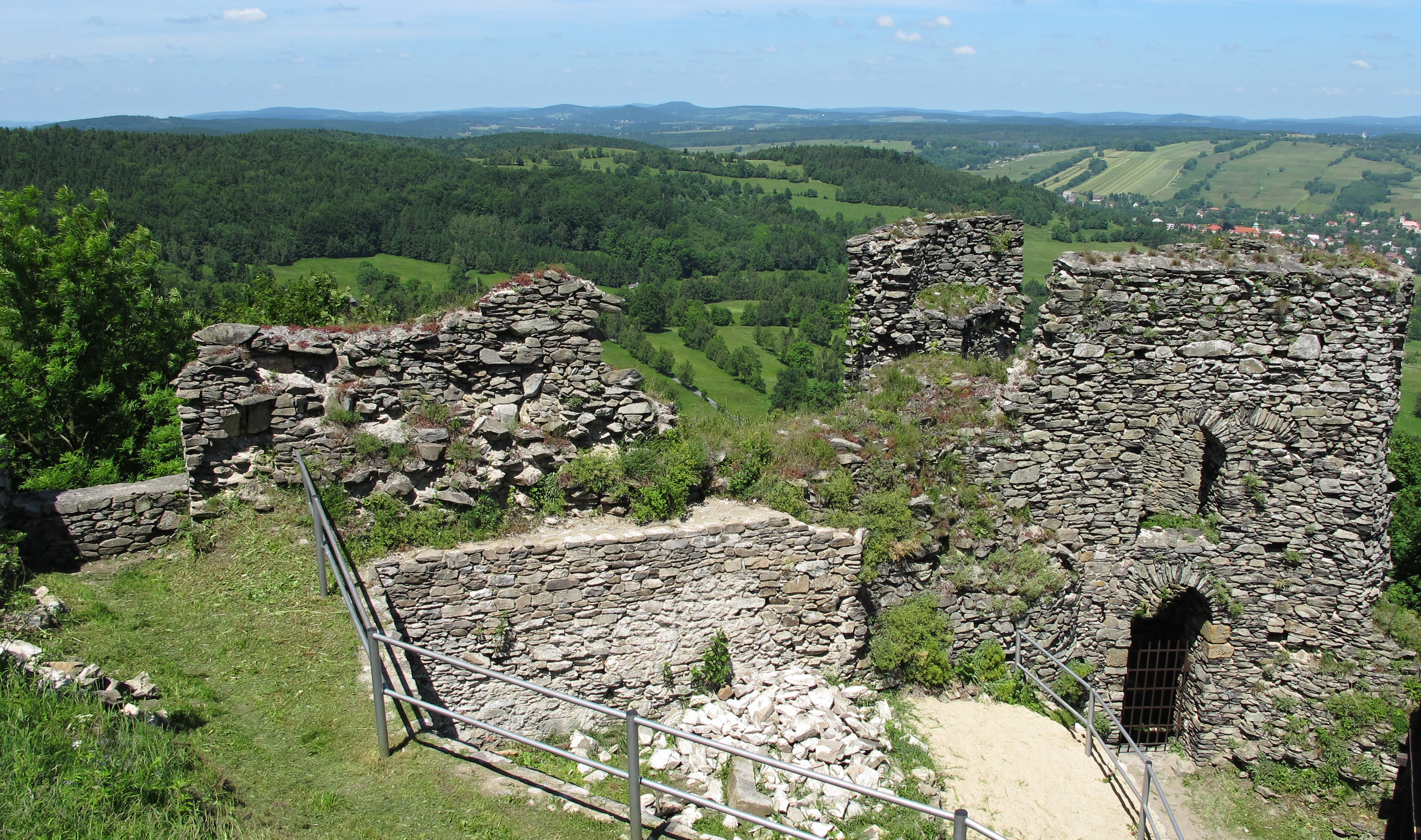
Tolštejn Castle

Until the issue of the imperial patent on 19 July 1765, the town used high justice rights. The execution site was on Šibeniční hill.

In 1642, during the Thirty Years' War, the Swedes destroyed the nearby Tolštejn Castle. At the time of the re-Catholicisation, according to the list of 3 December 1652, 108 people left Jiřetín.

After the Thirty Years' War, there were 29 desolate houses from 92 houses in Jiřetín. In 1656, Jiřetín's pastor stated that mines of gold, silver, copper, and also coal were put into operation. In 1750, the mining of ores was carried out in the hereditary cathedral of Saint Christopher on the Cross Mountain, in 1781 Jan Evangelista adit was built. In 1681 he bought the rumby estate of Prince Anton Florian of Liechtenstein, whose family shared the destiny of Jiřetín until 1919. In 1804, after the destruction of the manipulation building, the ore had to be weighed into Saxon Freiberg, which was very wasteful, so the mining did not continue. The land Jedlová worked in the early 18th century Baroque glassworks. In 1805, the road used today was built over the Stožecké saddle. The junction under Jiřetín carries the unofficial name Na Mýtě, probably to prove that the old trade route, which led to toll collection in Tolštejn, was conducted here. In 1848 a national guard was formed in Jiřetín. In 1907, with regards to the reformation of the public administration, the abolition of the estate and the establishment of districts, it became part of the Rumburk district, later in the district of Varnsdorf.

The population of Jiřetín reached its highest in 1880. After the mid-19th century, due to diversion of the main road, and in relation to industrial and building development near Varnsdorf, Jiřetín stopped their floor plan development. Only two buildings were built; the Shoreline building at the foot of the Cross Mountain, and the firearms building just next to it. At the beginning of the 20th century a new waterworks system was built. On 8 September 1909, electricity was introduced in Jiřetín. During World War I, 71 South Moravian natives were killed.

After World War II, the German-speaking population was expelled and the area was repopulated by Czech people, mostly from inland. The population dropped under 1,000 and Jiřetín lost its town status.

== Demographics ==
Historical population

Year	Pop.	±%
1869	3,392	—
1880	3,415	+0.7%
1890	3,379	−1.1%
1900	3,275	−3.1%
1910	3,172	−3.1%

Year	Pop.	±%
1921	2,654	−16.3%
1930	2,961	+11.6%
1950	992	−66.5%
1961	1,039	+4.7%
1970	888	−14.5%

Year	Pop.	±%
1980	776	−12.6%
1991	614	−20.9%
2001	570	−7.2%
2011	647	+13.5%
2021	682	+5.4%

Source: Censuses

== Transport ==
The train station Jiřetín pod Jedlovou is located on the railway line Děčín–Varnsdorf. However, this station is situated just outside the territory of Jiřetín pod Jedlovou.

== Sport ==
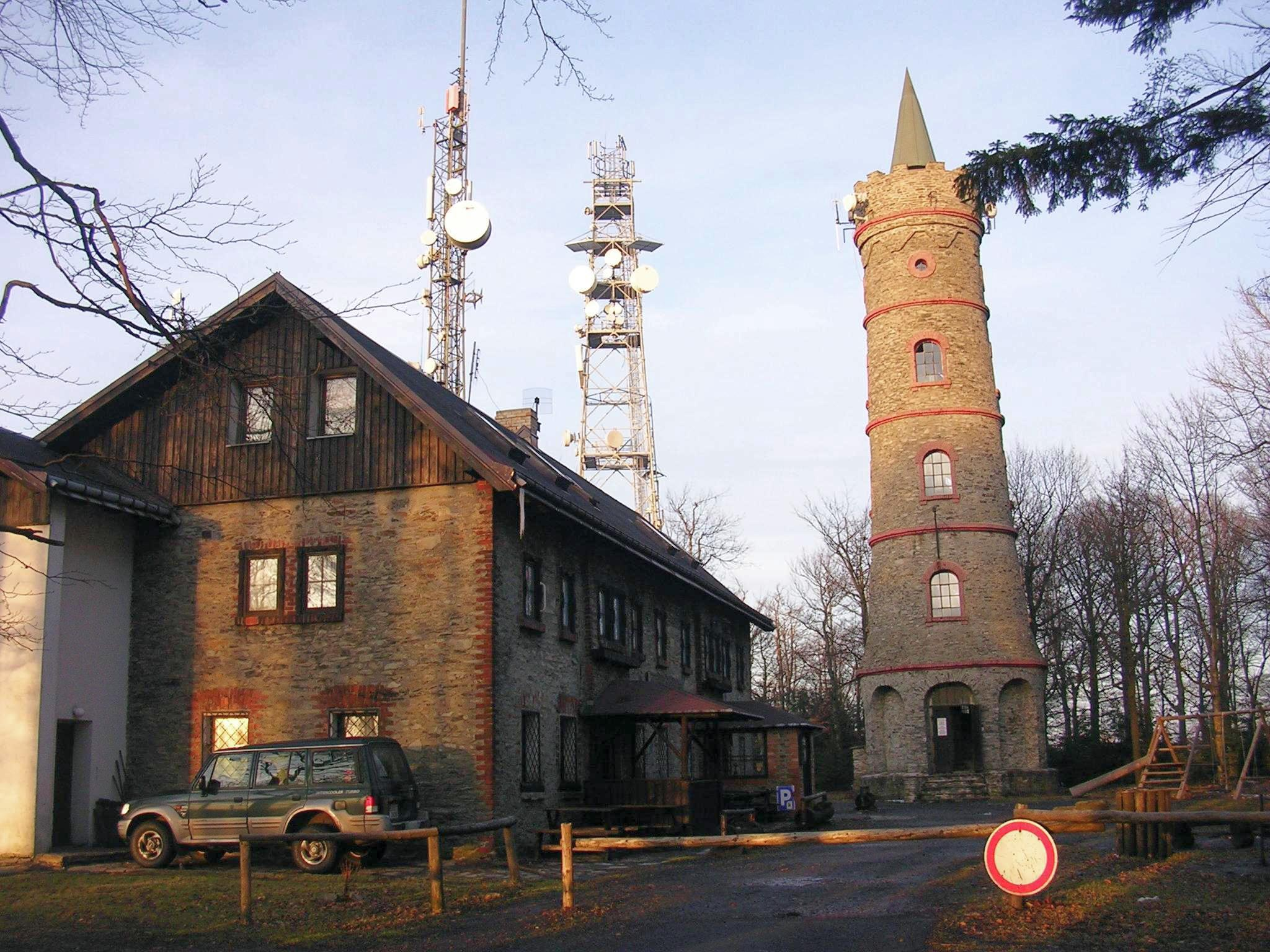
Observation tower on Jedlová

Jiřetín pod Jedlovou is known for its ski resort on Jedlová.

== Sights ==
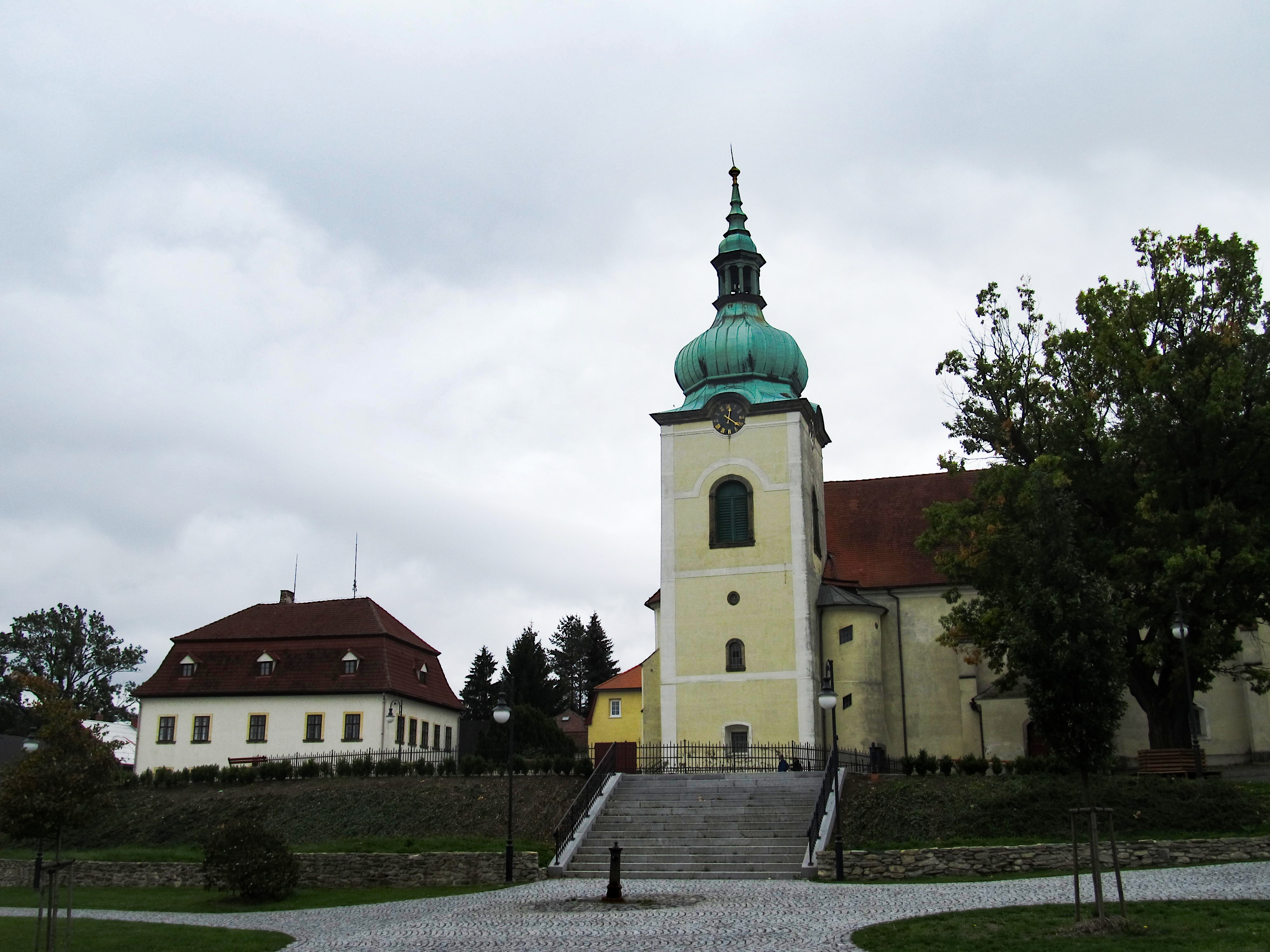
Church of the Holy Trinity and the rectory

The Church of the Holy Trinity was built by the Jiřetín's inhabitants in 1587. It was consecrated in 1612. Most of the equipment date from the 18th century. The rectory was built in 1755 and at that time it was one of the most magnificent buildings of its kind in Bohemia. Part of the building houses a small museum focusing on the history of Tolštejn Castle and silver ore mining.

Křížová hora is a hill with a pilgrimage site right above Jiřetín pod Jedlovou. The complex was consecrated in 1764 and includes the Stations of the Cross and several valuable statues.

Jedlová is the third largest mountain of the Lusatian Mountains. On its top is a 23 metres (75 ft) high stone observation tower, built in 1891.

Ruin of Tolštejn Castle on the eponymous mountain is a popular tourist destination. It includes a rocky lookout and a restaurant.

== Notable people ==
- Johann Aloys Miksch (1765–1845), opera singer

== Gallery ==
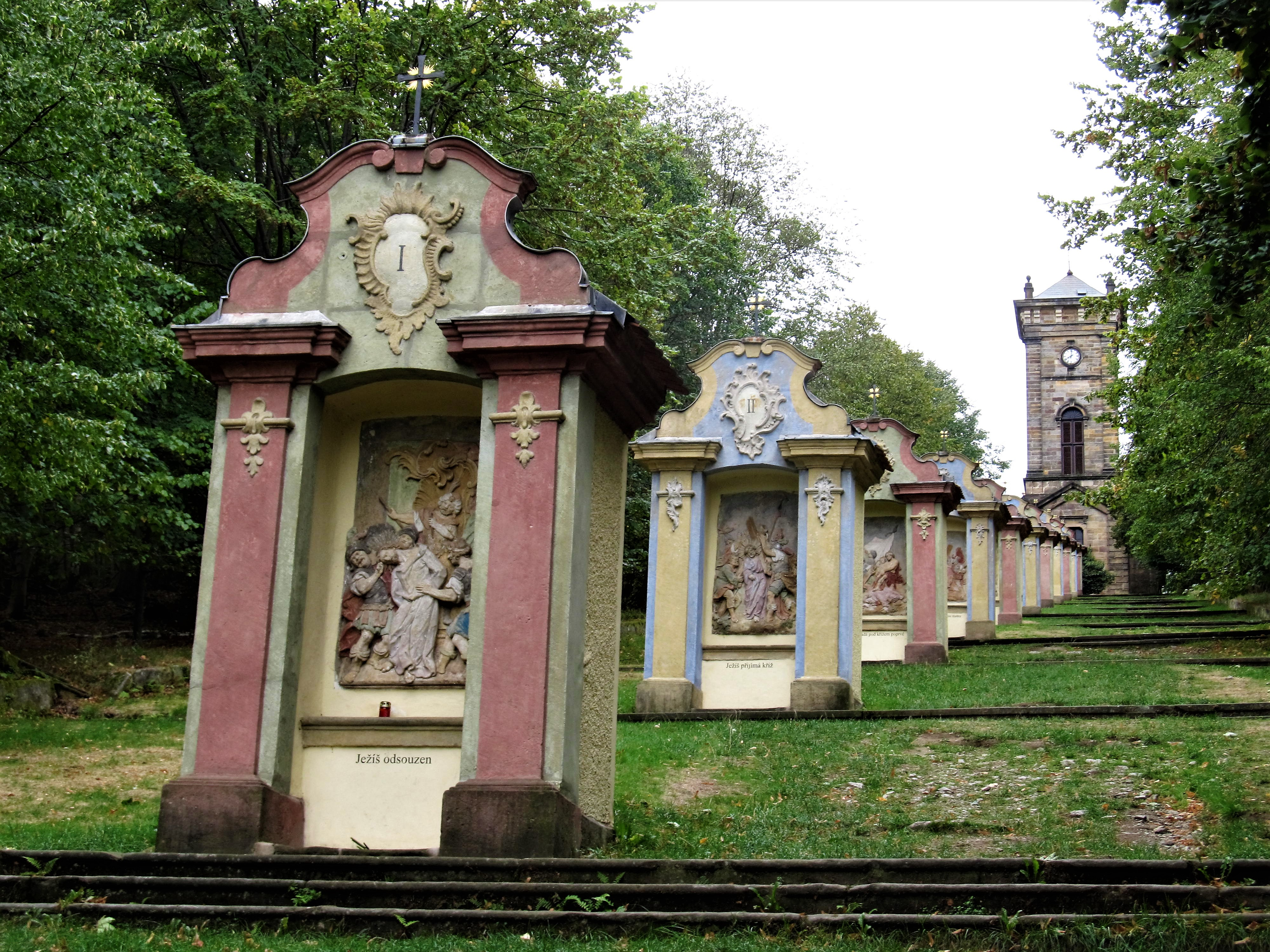
Stations of the Cross on the Křížová hora

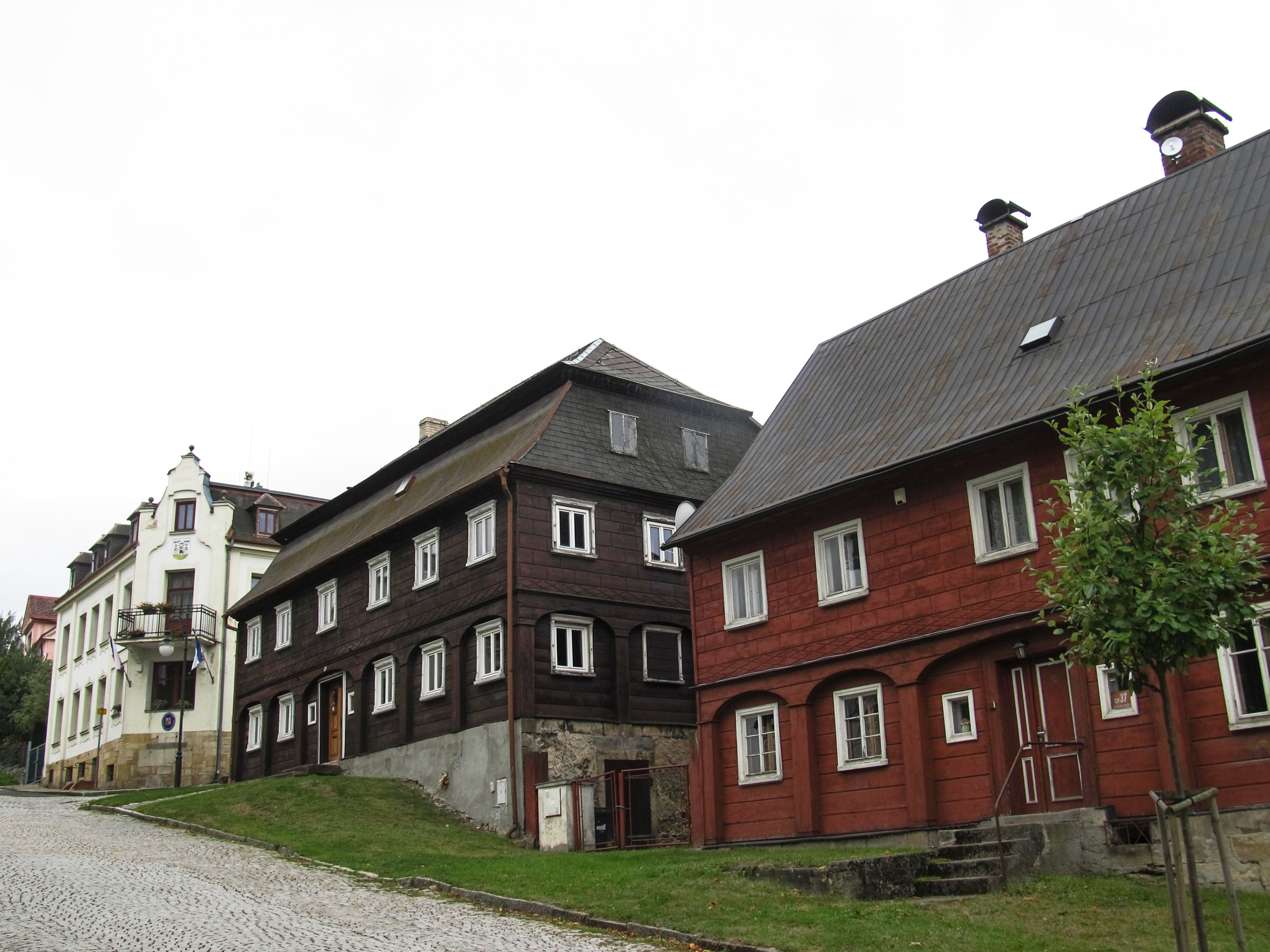
Jiřího Square with the town hall (left)
