= Max Langer =

German painter

Max Langer (born 11 July 1897 in Spitzkunnersdorf (Krs. Zittau); died 3 May 1985 in Niederoderwitz, was a German painter. From 1917 to 1921 he studied with Paul Rößler in the Kunstgewerbeakademie Dresden. After a few years of wandering through Bavaria and Munich he returned to Niederoderwitz.
