= Mandau =

River in Germany

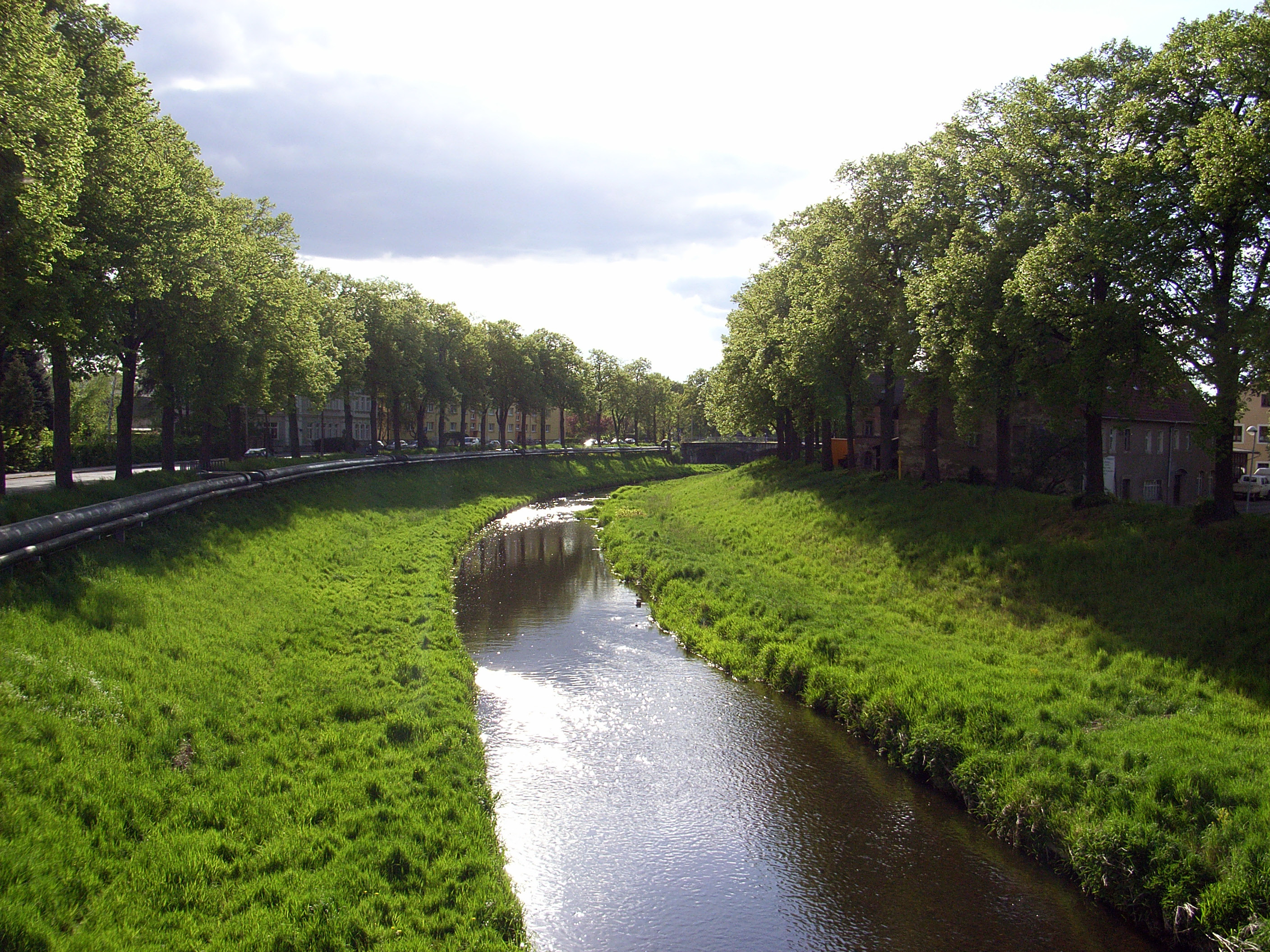
- The Mandau near Zittau

Location
- Countries: Czech Republic; Germany

Physical characteristics
- Mouth
  - location: Lusatian Neisse
  - coordinates: 50.8902°N 14.8256°E
- Length: 40.9 km (25.4 mi)

Basin features
- Progression: Lusatian Neisse→ Oder→ Baltic Sea

The Mandau (Czech: Mandava) is a 40.9 km-long (25.4 mi) river in Bohemia (Czech Republic) and Saxony (Germany). It is a left tributary of the Lusatian Neisse, which it joins near Zittau.

It originates from multiple springs north of the 580.6m (1902 feet AMSL) Wolf Mountain (Czech: Vlčí hora, German: Wolfsberg) in the Šluknov Hook, which join in Panský (German: Herrnwalde) at 1690 feet above sea level. Coming from Zahrady (German: Gärten) another stream joins in Nové Křečany (Neu Ehrenberg). From there the Mandau flows in a southeasterly direction through Rumburk (Rumburg; Bohemia), Seifhennersdorf (Saxony, Upper Lusatia) and Varnsdorf (Warnsdorf; Bohemia). Afterwards it flows eastwards through another part of Upper Lusatia in which the Lausur joins in Großschönau, from Hainewalde through the Roschertal to Mittelherwigsdorf, where the Landwasser joins, and finally it reaches Zittau where it flows east of the town 228 meters above sea level into the Lusatian Neisse.

== See also ==
- List of rivers of the Czech Republic
- List of rivers of Saxony
