= Tolštejn Castle =

Medieval castle in the Czech Republic

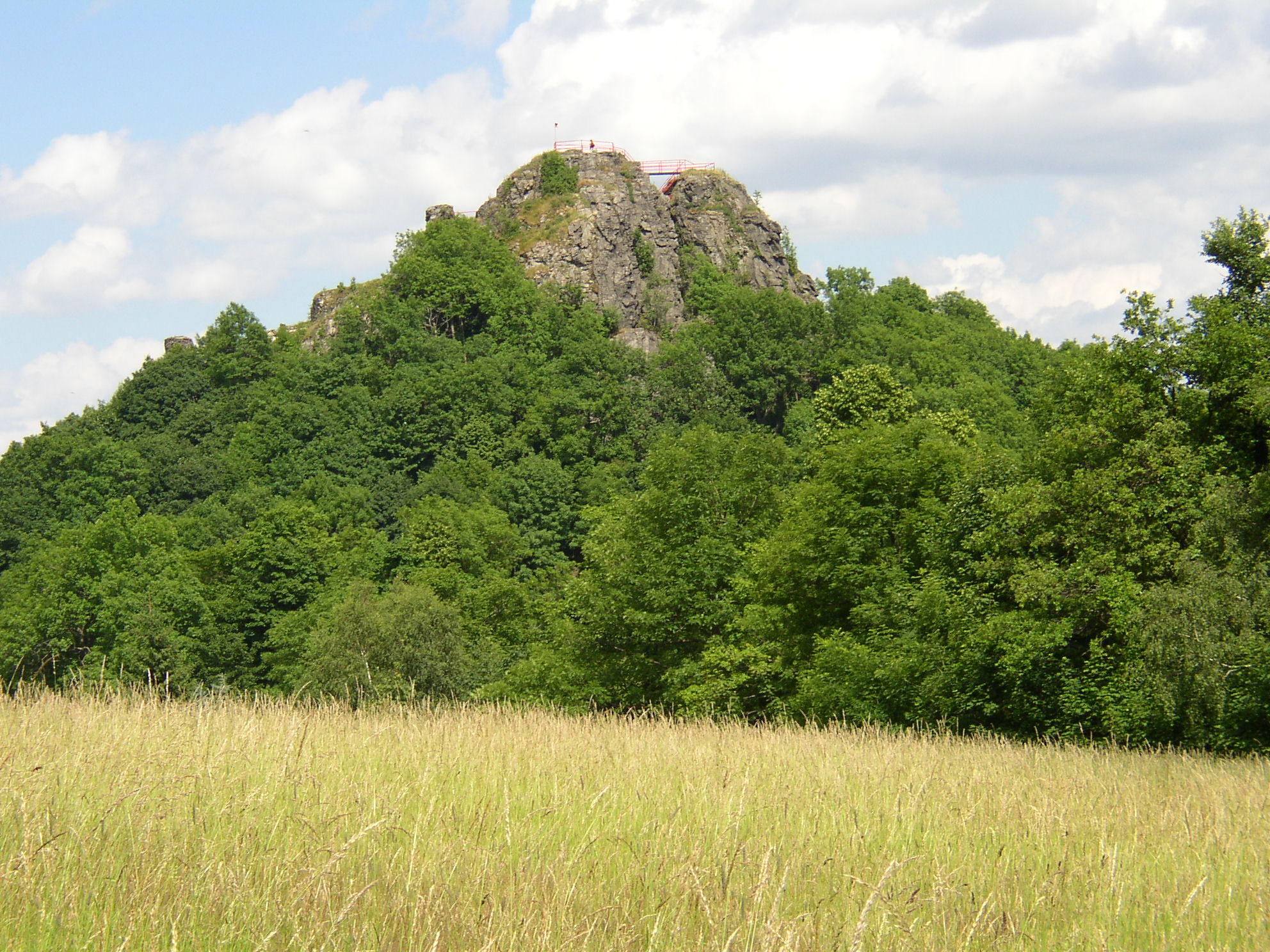
- Ruin of Tolštejn Castle

- Location within Czech Republic

General information
- Type: Medieval castle
- Location: Jiřetín pod Jedlovou, Ústí nad Labem Region, Czech Republic, Czech Republic
- Coordinates: 50°51′25″N 14°34′54″E
- Elevation: 670 m (2,200 ft)

Tolštejn Castle (German: Tollenstein) is a ruin of a medieval castle in the municipal area of Jiřetín pod Jedlovou in the Ústí nad Labem Region of the Czech Republic. It is situated on the Tolštejn mountain in Lusatian Mountains, 670 metres (2,200 ft) above sea level. It is located approximately 4 kilometres (2.5 mi) south of Varnsdorf.

== History ==
Existence of the castle is first mentioned in 1337. It was built for the protection of the road from Bohemia to Lusatia. The Wartenberg family owned the castle until around 1402, when it was acquired by lords of Dubá. In 1481, the manor with the castle became a property of Schleinitz family from Saxony. After 1587, the castle changed owners many times. During the Thirty Years' War in 1642 it was burned down by Swedish Army and was never restored.

== Tourism ==
Today the ruins of the castle are one of the most visited places in the region. The ruin includes a rocky lookout. A restaurant was built in 1865, which is still in operation.
