= Horní Podluží =

- Municipality
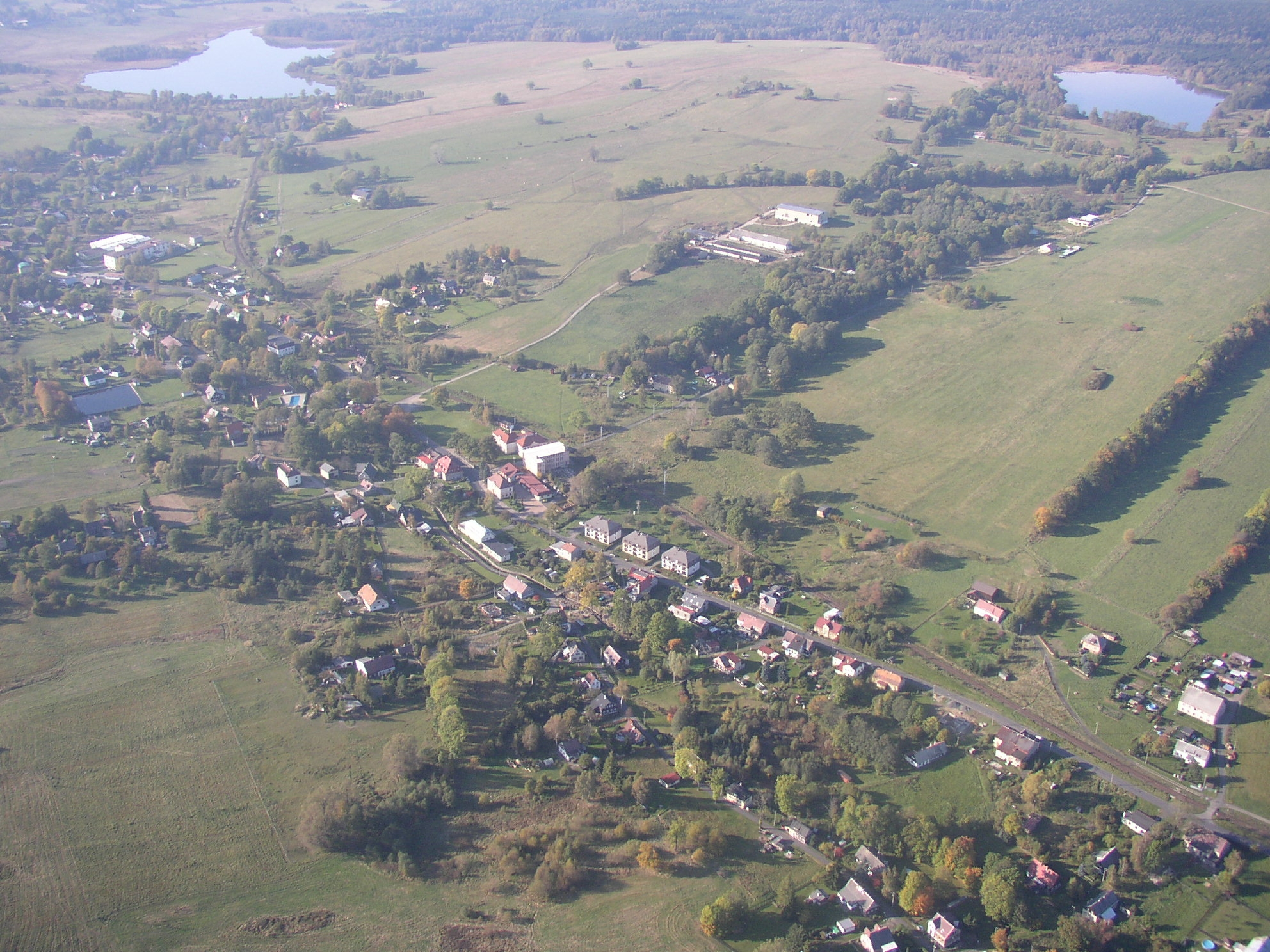
- Aerial view

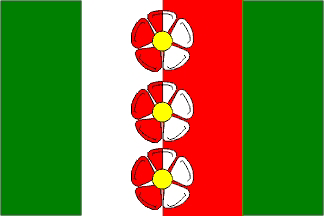
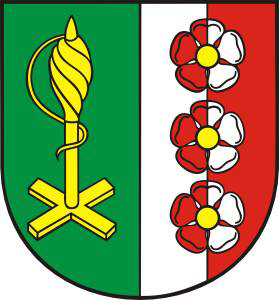
- Flag Coat of arms

- Location in the Czech Republic
- Coordinates: 50°52′53″N 14°32′45″E
- Country: Czech Republic
- Region: Ústí nad Labem
- District: Děčín
- First mentioned: 1485

Area
  - Total: 7.44 km^{2} (2.87 sq mi)
- Elevation: 436 m (1,430 ft)

Population (2026-01-01)
  - Total: 821
  - Density: 110/km^{2} (286/sq mi)
- Time zone: UTC+1 (CET)
  - Summer (DST): UTC+2 (CEST)
- Postal code: 407 57
- Website: www.hornipodluzi.cz

Horní Podluží (until 1947 Horní Grunt; German: Obergrund) is a municipality and village in Děčín District in the Ústí nad Labem Region of the Czech Republic. It has about 800 inhabitants.

Horní Podluží lies approximately 29 kilometres (18 mi) north-east of Děčín, 44 km (27 mi) north-east of Ústí nad Labem, and 89 km (55 mi) north of Prague.

== Administrative division ==
Horní Podluží consists of four municipal parts (in brackets population according to the 2021 census):

- Horní Podluží (694)
- Ladečka (12)
- Světlík (10)
- Žofín (83)

== Demographics ==
Historical population
Year	Pop.	±%
1869	2,086	—
1880	2,082	−0.2%
1890	2,026	−2.7%
1900	1,946	−3.9%
1910	1,983	+1.9%
1921	1,748	−11.9%
1930	2,088	+19.5%
1950	1,025	−50.9%
1961	813	−20.7%
1970	826	+1.6%
1980	846	+2.4%
1991	687	−18.8%
2001	758	+10.3%
2011	740	−2.4%
2021	799	+8.0%
Source: Censuses
