= Landwasser (Mandau) =

River in Germany

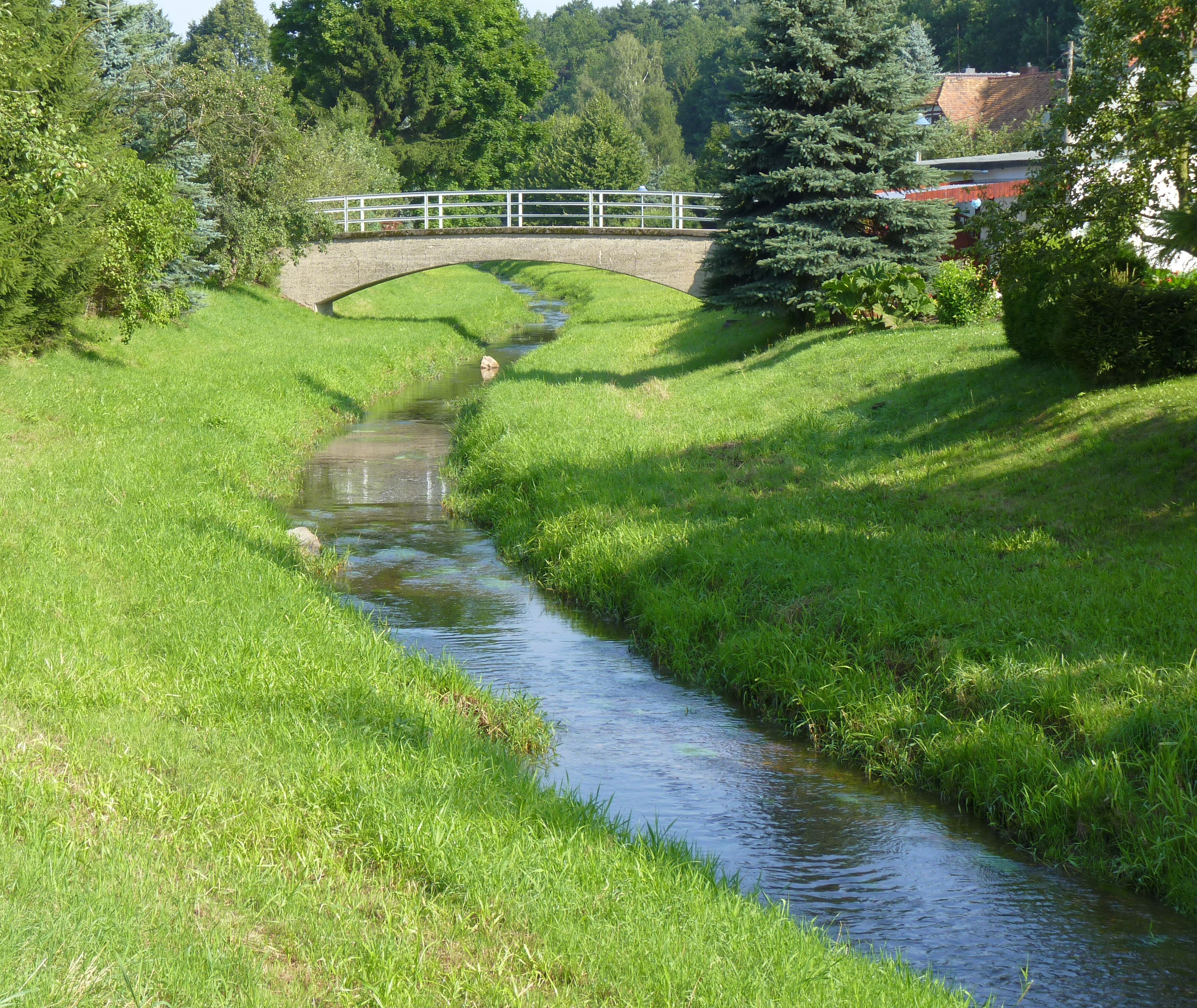

Location
- Country: Germany
- States: Saxony

Physical characteristics
- Mouth
  - location: Mandau
  - coordinates: 50.9253°N 14.7433°E

Basin features
- Progression: Mandau→ Lusatian Neisse→ Oder→ Baltic Sea

The Landwasser (Upper Sorbian: Landwóz) is a river of Saxony, Germany. It is a left tributary of the Mandau, which it joins near Mittelherwigsdorf.

== See also ==
- List of rivers of Saxony
