= Oderwitz =

- Municipality
- Location of Oderwitz within Görlitz district
- Interactive map of Oderwitz
- Location within Germany Location within Saxony
- Coordinates: 50°57′32″N 14°43′7″E
- Country: Germany
- State: Saxony
- District: Görlitz
- Subdivisions: 2

Government
  - Mayor (2020–27): Cornelius Stempel

Area
  - Total: 35.92 km^{2} (13.87 sq mi)
- Elevation: 350 m (1,150 ft)

Population (2025-12-31)
  - Total: 4,540
  - Density: 126/km^{2} (327/sq mi)
- Time zone: UTC+01:00 (CET)
  - Summer (DST): UTC+02:00 (CEST)
- Postal codes: 02791
- Dialling codes: 035842
- Vehicle registration: GR, LÖB, NOL, NY, WSW, ZI
- Website: www.oderwitz.de

Oderwitz (German: [ˈoːdɐvɪts]; from Slavic for 'rinse'; Upper Sorbian: Wódrjeńca, pronounced [ˈwʊdʁʲɛnʲtsa]) is a Saxon municipality in the district Görlitz in Upper Lusatia, Germany. It is located in the southeast of the Free State of Saxony near the border with the Czech Republic. It consists of the two districts Oberoderwitz (literally "Upper Oderwitz") and Niederoderwitz (literally "Lower Oderwitz"), in the historic tripartite division of the place also Mitteloderwitz is known.

== Culture and sightseeing ==
=== Buildings ===
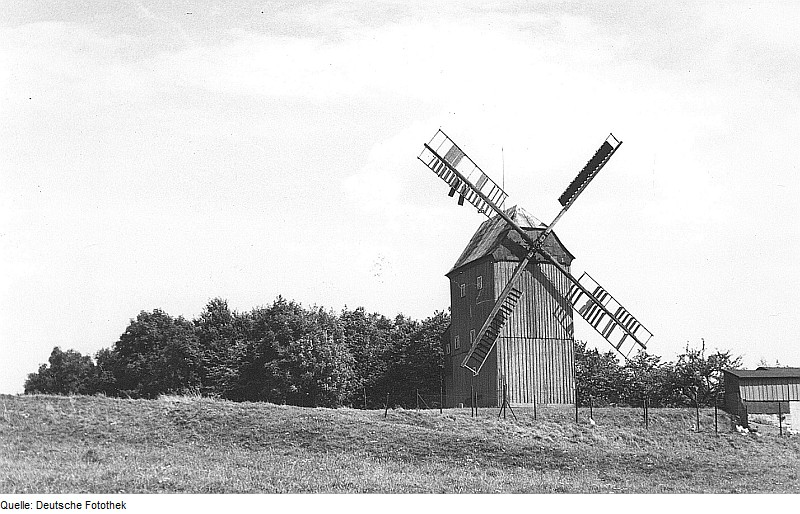
The Neumann Mill in 1971. Refer Commons for other images of the mill

Oderwitz was once known for its many mills and even today it is known as the Windmill Village. Today, three windmills have been preserved, the Birkmühle, the Neumann-Mill and the Berndt-Mill. Two old watermills have also survived, the Bernhardt Mill and Lower Mill.

As in other parts of Lusatia, there are many half-timbered houses − over 450 in the village. The studio of the homeland painter Max Langer can be found in Niederoderwitz.

Due to the historic division and the size of the village, Oderwitz has two churches. Construction of the Niederoderwitz church began in 1719, and it was consecrated in 1726. It was built in Baroque style and has a richly decorated altar. The Oberoderwitz church was built from 1816 to 1821 in the architectural style of classicism.

=== Memorials ===
Towards the end of World War II since January 1945 in what is now the district Niederoderwitz one outpost of the Gross-Rosen concentration camp existed, which mainly Jewish inmates were used for forced labor. Five of them were murdered in the spring of 1945 by SS men. A memorial recalls them in the cemetery. Another memorial in the cemetery commemorates Oderwitz citizens who have fallen in the Franco-German war.

Oderwitz in the course of its history has been repeatedly ravaged by floods, which killed several people. For the flood victims of 1880 a memorial stone was built in Niederoderwitz near the river Landwasser. Furthermore, a small memorial located on the surface of the primary school Max Langer evocatives of the siblings Scholl.

In the cemetery of the suburb Oberoderwitz a grave recalls the Polish forced laborer Michalina Woysiak who was shot in May 1945. A commemorative plaque for the opponent of Hitler, Willi Netsch, at the house Dorfstraße 189 was removed after 1990.

=== Natural monuments ===
In the municipal area of Oderwitz there are many natural monuments of volcanic origin. The biggest is probably the mountain Oberoderwitzer Spitzberg with his head of Phonolite. On the slopes of the mountain Sonnenhübel, there are the so-called Steinklunsen, rock formations on which a dense beech forest has grown. Moreover, one can find several abandoned phonolite quarries, which have been reclaimed by nature, piece by piece, such as the Geiersberg or Steinberg near Spitzkunnersdorf.
