= Jiříkov =

- Town
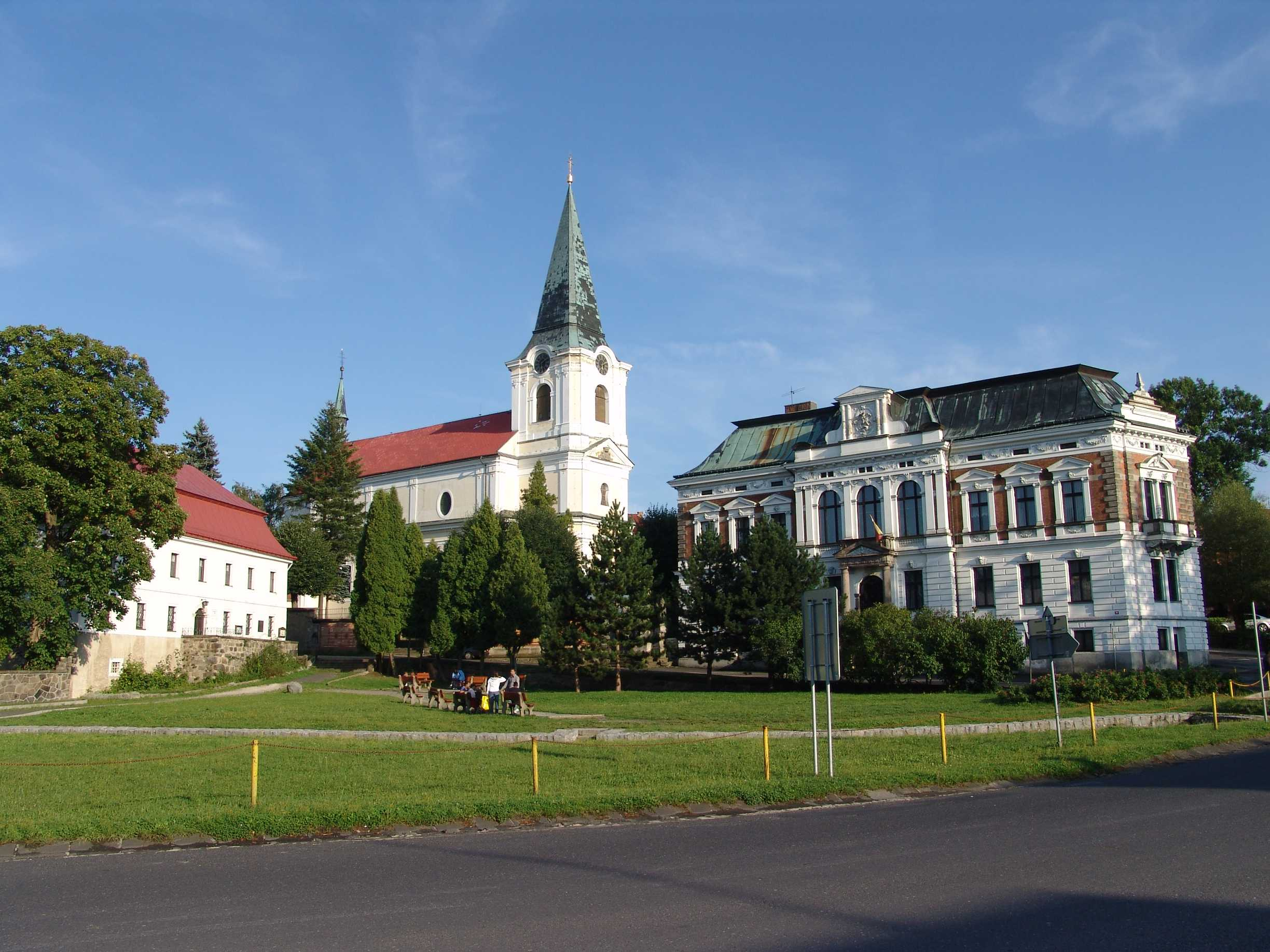
- Centre of the town with the Church of Saint George

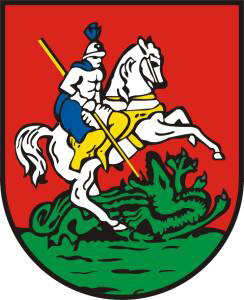
- Flag Coat of arms

- Location in the Czech Republic
- Coordinates: 50°59′40″N 14°34′15″E
- Country: Czech Republic
- Region: Ústí nad Labem
- District: Děčín
- First mentioned: 1346

Government
  - Mayor: Jindřich Jurajda

Area
  - Total: 13.31 km^{2} (5.14 sq mi)
- Elevation: 368 m (1,207 ft)

Population (2026-01-01)
  - Total: 3,472
  - Density: 260.9/km^{2} (675.6/sq mi)
- Time zone: UTC+1 (CET)
  - Summer (DST): UTC+2 (CEST)
- Postal code: 407 53
- Website: www.jirikov.cz

Jiříkov (Czech pronunciation: [ˈjɪr̝iːkof]; German: Georgswalde) is a town in Děčín District in the Ústí nad Labem Region of the Czech Republic. It has about 3,500 inhabitants. It lies in the Lusatian Highlands, on the border with Germany.

The main period of growth of Jiříkov occurred in the 19th century, when the settlement was industrialised, and in 1914 Jiříkov became a town. Filipov, a part of Jiříkov, is known for a Marian pilgrimage site with the Minor Basilica of Mary Help of Christians.

== Administrative division ==
Jiříkov consists of four municipal parts (in brackets population according to the 2021 census):

- Starý Jiříkov (2,840)
- Nový Jiříkov (76)
- Filipov (401)
- Loučné (143)

== Etymology ==
The original German name was derived from Dorf im Georgswalde (i.e. "the village in Georg's forest"), which was shortened to Georgswalde. The Czech name Jiříkov means "Jiří's" and derived from the personal name Jiří, which is a Czech variant of Georg.

== Geography ==
Jiříkov is located about 34 kilometres (21 mi) northeast of Děčín and 42 km (26 mi) northwest of Liberec. It lies in the salient region of Šluknov Hook, on the border with Germany. The town is urbanistically fused with the neighbouring German town of Ebersbach-Neugersdorf.

Jiříkov is situated in the Lusatian Highlands. The stream Jiříkovský potok flows through the town.

== History ==
The first written mention of Jiříkov is from 1346. In the 15th century, it belonged to the Šluknov estate. The village of Filipov was founded in 1681 by the then-owner of the estate, Philipp Sigmund of Dietrichstein, and named after him. Flax was grown in the vicinity of Jiříkov, which was further processed, but due to the wars, the linen craft began to flourish only from 1751. In 1753, the village was promoted to a market town by Empress Maria Theresa.

The first textile factory was founded in 1807, and during the 19th century Jiříkov was industrialised. In 1873, the railway was opened.

A reported Marian vision occurred in the village of Filipov on 13 January 1866, where a bedridden woman, Magdalene Kade, was instantly healed after seeing the Virgin Mary. This event is a recognised 19th-century miracle, leading to the construction of a basilica.

The population grew rapidly and in 1914 Jiříkov became a town. In the interwar period, disagreements between the Czech and German populations began, and in 1938 Jiříkov was annexed by Nazi Germany. After World War II, the German-speaking people were expelled and Jiříkov was repopulated by Czech settlers.

== Demographics ==
Historical population

Year	Pop.	±%
1869	8,220	—
1880	8,281	+0.7%
1890	8,754	+5.7%
1900	10,084	+15.2%
1910	11,096	+10.0%

Year	Pop.	±%
1921	9,452	−14.8%
1930	10,078	+6.6%
1950	4,012	−60.2%
1961	4,278	+6.6%
1970	3,945	−7.8%

Year	Pop.	±%
1980	3,905	−1.0%
1991	3,638	−6.8%
2001	3,920	+7.8%
2011	3,795	−3.2%
2021	3,460	−8.8%

Source: Censuses

== Transport ==
On the Czech–German border are the road and railway border crossings Jiříkov / Ebersbach. The railway that runs through Jiříkov is unused.

== Sights ==
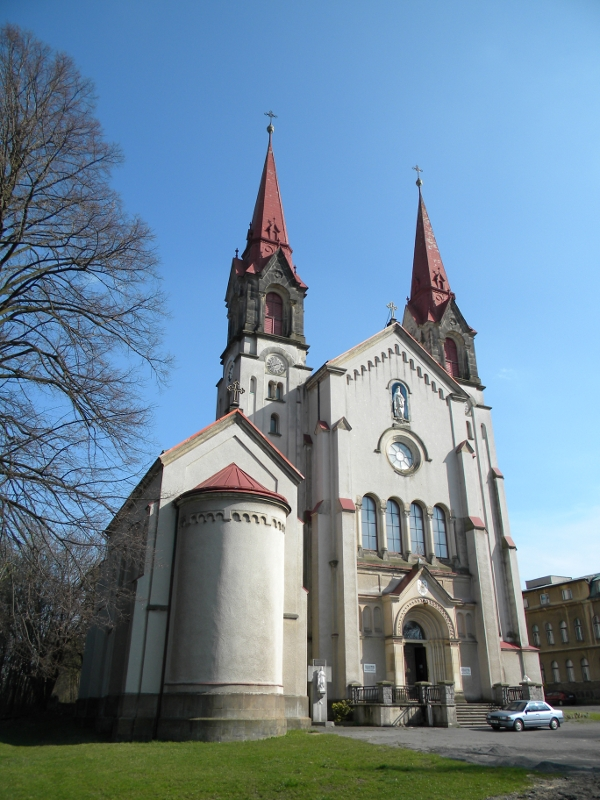
Minor Basilica of Mary Help of Christians

The main landmark of Jiříkov is the Church of Saint George. It was built in the Baroque style in 1724–1728, on the site of an old Gothic church.

The Minor Basilica of Mary Help of Christians is located in Filipov. It is an important Marian pilgrimage site, built on the site of an alleged miracle from 1866. The Church of Mary Help of Christians was built in the neo-Gothic style in 1873–1885, next to a chapel built in 1870–1873. The church was promoted to a basilica minor in 1926.
