= Vlčí hora =

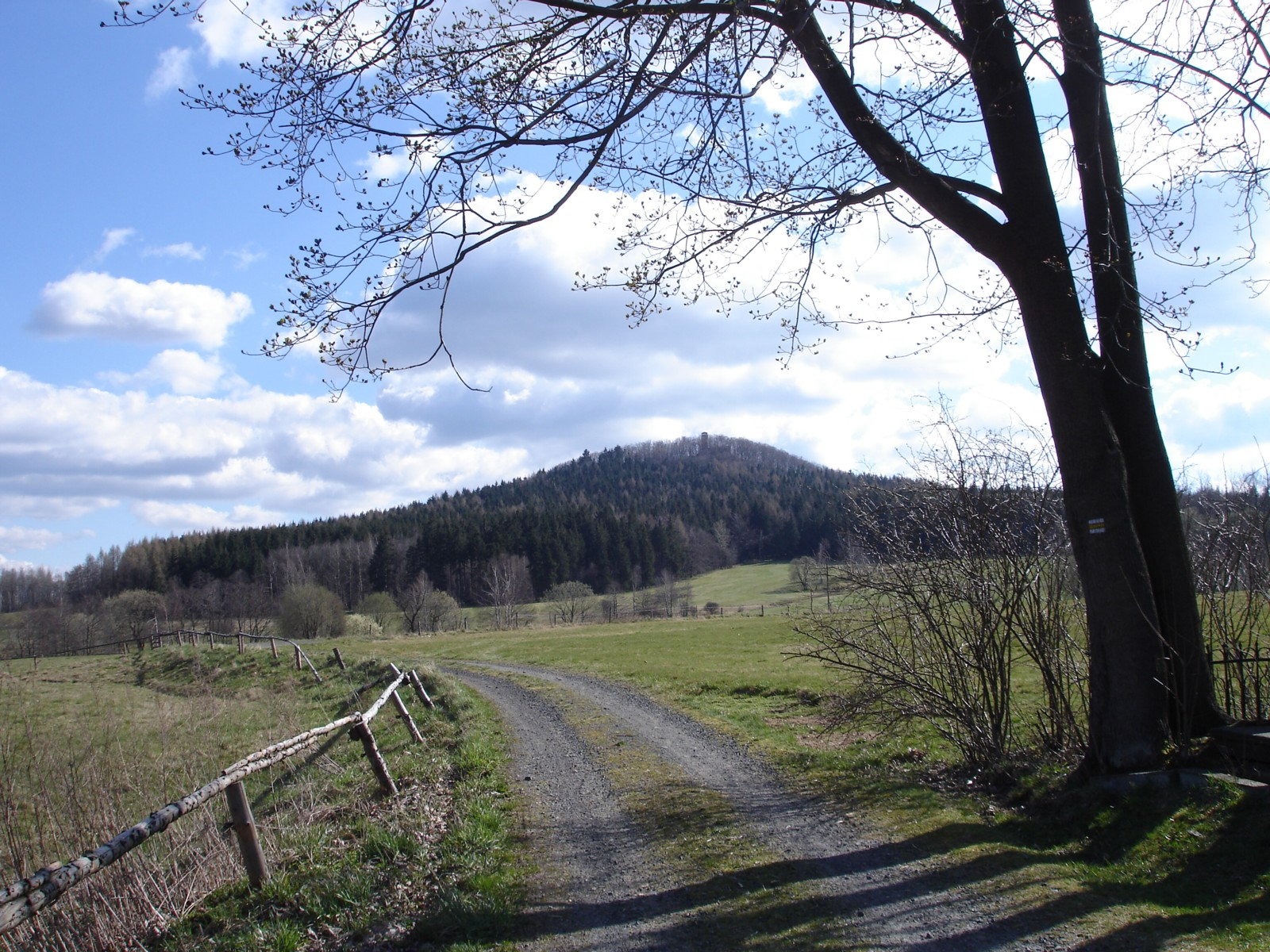
- Vlčí hora von Norden, Blick von Panský

Highest point
- Elevation: 591 m n.m. (1,939 ft)
- Prominence: 141 m (463 ft)
- Isolation: 3.6 km (2.2 mi)
- Coordinates: 50°56′23″N 14°27′55″E

Geography
- Location within Czech Republic
- Location: Czech Republic
- Parent range: Lusatian Highlands

Geology
- Mountain type: cone mountain
- Rock type: granite with tephrite intrusion

The Vlčí hora (German: Wolfsberg, 591 m) is one of the most prominent peaks in the lowlands of the Šluknov Hook (Šluknovsko) in the Czech Republic.

== Location and area ==
The Vlčí hora is located in the Šluknov Hook, six kilometres west of Rumburk immediately on the edge of the forest and rock landscape of the Bohemian Switzerland. At its foot are the municipalities of Staré Křečany (Alt Ehrenberg) with the village of Brtníky (Zeidler), and Krásná Lípa (Schönlinde) with its villages of Sněžná (Schnauhübel), Vlčí Hora (Wolfsberg) and Zahrady (Gärten). The summit is crowned by an old mountain hut with an observation tower. At the eastern foot of the mountain is the Veronica Well (Veronikabrunnen or Verunčina studánka). Immediately north of the mountain is the source region of the River Mandau.

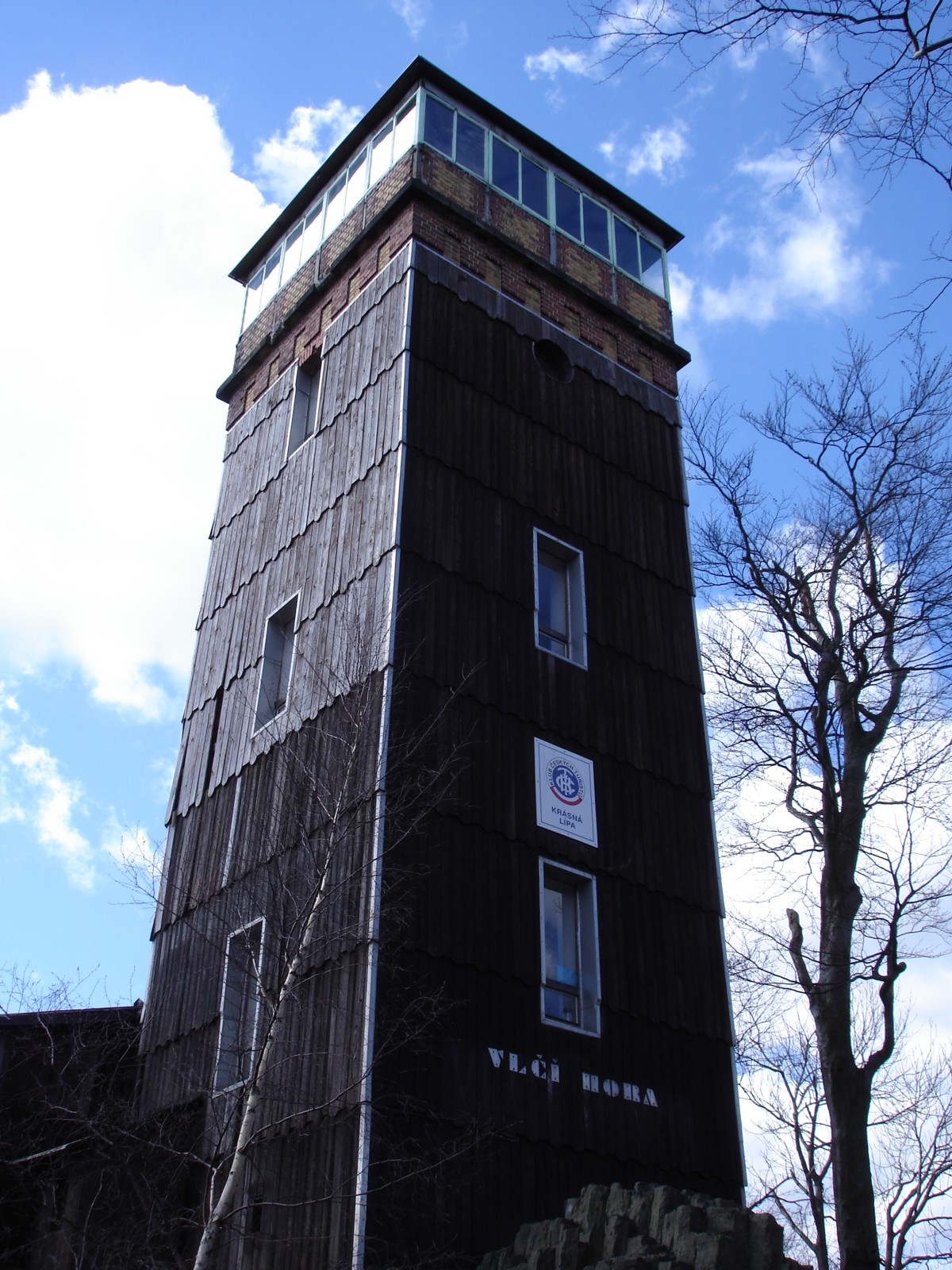
Observation tower

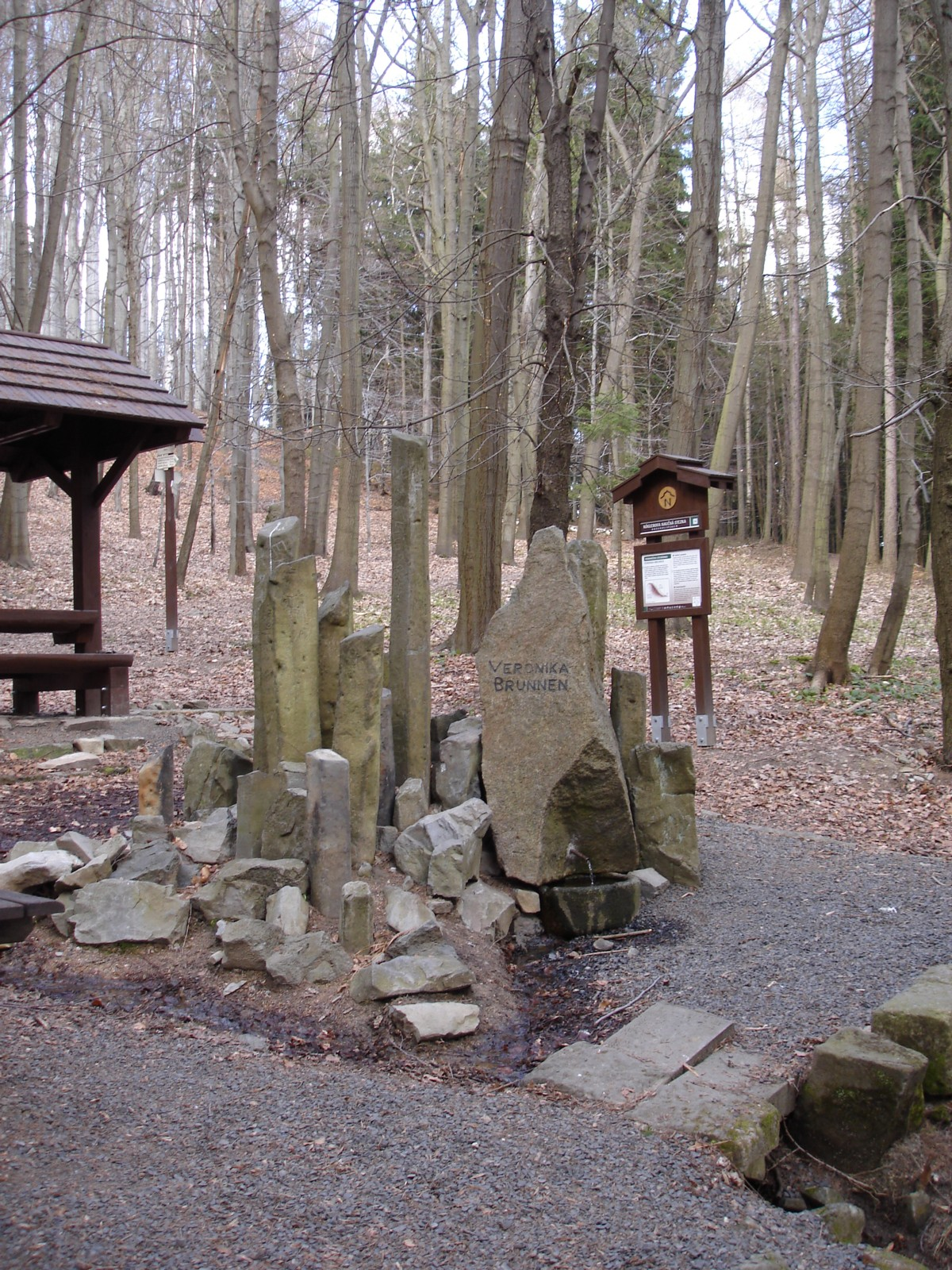
Veronica Well

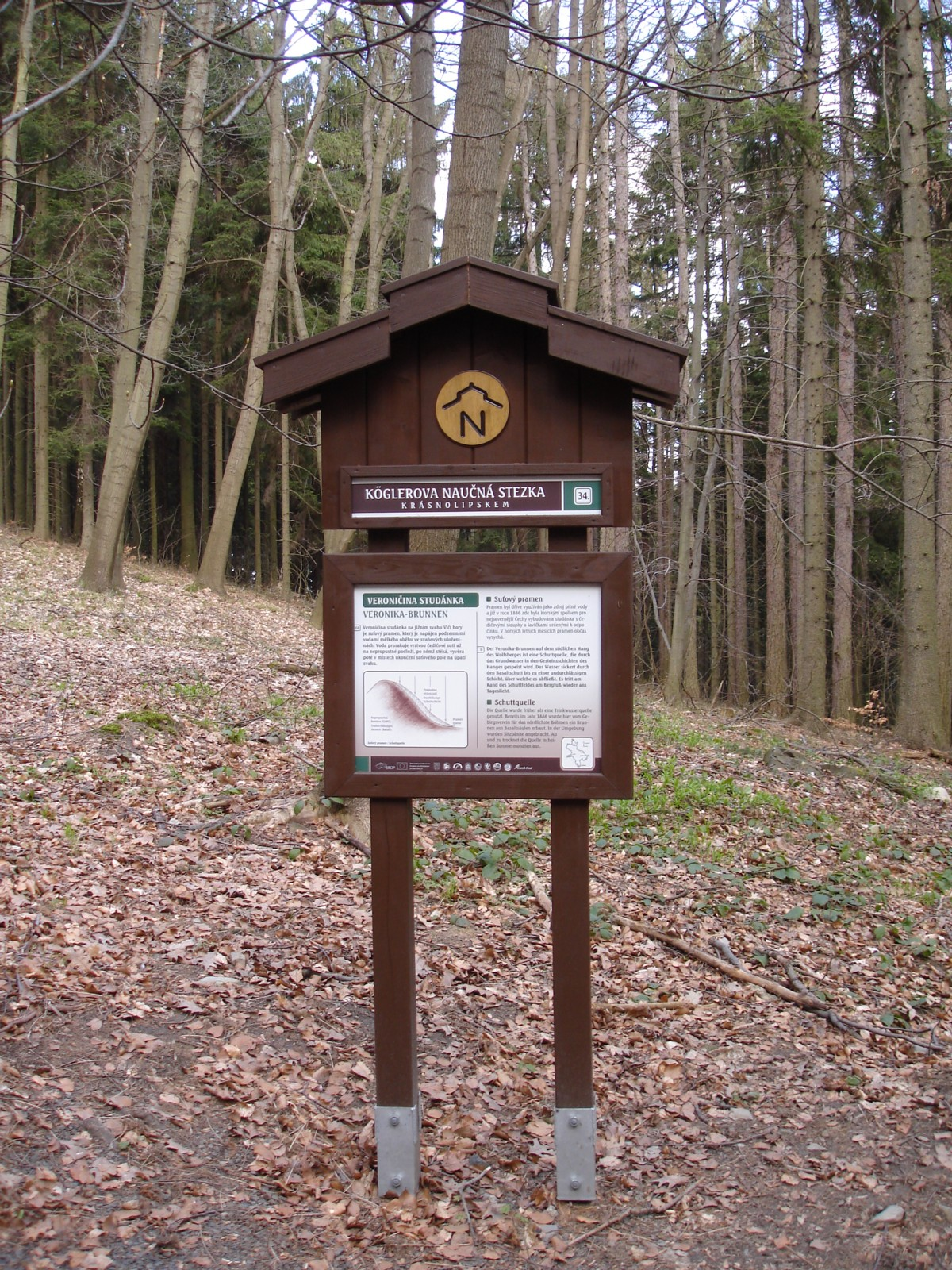
Nature trail
