= Görlitz 3 =

State electoral district of Germany

59: Görlitz 3
- Electoral district for the Landtag of Saxony
- Görlitz 3 in 2024
- District: Görlitz
- Electorate: 48,159 (2024)
- Major settlements: Bernstadt a. d. Eigen, Ebersbach-Neugersdorf, Herrnhut, Löbau, Neusalza-Spremberg, and Ostritz

Current electoral district
- Party: AfD
- Member: Roman Golombek

Görlitz 3 is an electoral constituency (German: Wahlkreis) represented in the Landtag of Saxony. It elects one member via first-past-the-post voting. Under the constituency numbering system, it is designated as constituency 59. It is within the district of Görlitz.

== Geography ==
The constituency comprises the towns of Bernstadt a. d. Eigen, Ebersbach-Neugersdorf, Herrnhut, Löbau, Neusalza-Spremberg, and Ostritz, and the municipalities of Beiersdorf, Dürrhennersdorf, Großschweidnitz, Kottmar, Lawalde, Oppach, Rosenbach, Schönau-Berzdorf a. d. Eigen, and Schönbach within the district of Görlitz.

There were 48,159 eligible voters in 2024.

== Members ==
Election	Member	Party	%
2014	Heinz Lehmann	CDU	40.7
2019	Mario Kumpf	AfD	38.4
2024	Roman Golombek	AfD	43.0

== Election results ==
=== 2024 election ===
State election (2024): Görlitz 3
Notes:	Blue background denotes the winner of the electorate vote. Pink background denotes a candidate elected from their party list. Yellow background denotes an electorate win by a list member, or other incumbent. A ✓ or ✗ denotes status of any incumbent, win or lose respectively.						
Party	Candidate	Votes	%	±%	Party votes	%	±%
AfD	Roman Golombek	15,138	43.0	▲4.5	14,468	41.0	▲3.8
CDU	Christian Conrad Clemens	12,726	36.1	▲2.0	11,731	33.2	▼2.5
BSW	Carsten Henning Berg	3,177	9.0		3,597	10.2	
FW	Roland Schedler	936	2.7	▼3.6	617	1.7	▼1.9
SPD	Andreas Wünsche	763	2.2	▼1.8	1,181	3.3	▼0.8
Left	Ferdinand Lorenz	733	2.1	▼6.6	680	1.9	▼5.1
Freie Sachsen	K. Dienel	642	1.8		952	2.7	
Greens	Thomas Pilz	561	1.6	▼2.5	730	2.1	▼1.9
APT					343	1.0	
dieBasis	Stefan Heinke	322	0.9		150	0.4	
FDP	Toralf Einsle	236	0.7	▼3.8	209	0.6	▼2.9
PARTEI					191	0.5	▼0.4
Values					147	0.4	
BD					92	0.3	
Bündnis C					80	0.2	
Pirates					55	0.2	
V-Partei3					29	0.1	
BüSo					15	0.0	
ÖDP					15	0.0	
Informal votes		420			372		
Total valid votes		35,234			35,282		
Turnout		35,654	74.0	▲4.4			
AfD hold	Majority	2,412	6.9				

=== 2019 election ===
State election (2019): Görlitz 3
Notes:	Blue background denotes the winner of the electorate vote. Pink background denotes a candidate elected from their party list. Yellow background denotes an electorate win by a list member, or other incumbent. A ✓ or ✗ denotes status of any incumbent, win or lose respectively.						
Party	Candidate	Votes	%	±%	Party votes	%	±%
AfD	Mario Kumpf	12,934	38.4	▲23.2	12,561	37.2	▲22.6
CDU	Matthias Reuter	11,466	34.1	▼6.6	12,057	35.7	▼5.3
Left	Marie Wobst	2,912	8.7	▼9.0	2,357	7.0	▼9.7
FW	Rico Hertrampf	2,106	6.3		1,219	3.6	▲0.9
FDP	Christine Schlagehan	1,509	4.5	▼0.3	1,179	3.5	▲0.9
Greens	Silvio Pfeiffer-Prauß	1,382	4.1	▼2.7	1,341	4.0	▲0.4
SPD	Thomas Kuhne	1,338	4.0	▼4.4	1,403	4.2	▼4.7
APT					489	1.4	▲0.5
PARTEI					328	1.0	▲0.6
NPD					210	0.6	▼5.1
Verjüngungsforschung					160	0.5	
The Blue Party					112	0.3	
Pirates					76	0.2	▼0.5
Awakening of German Patriots - Central Germany					58	0.2	
ÖDP					52	0.2	
PDV					43	0.1	
DKP					38	0.1	
BüSo					36	0.1	▼0.1
Humanists					32	0.1	
Informal votes		515			411		
Total valid votes		33,647			33,751		
Turnout		34,162	67.4	▲16.9			
AfD gain from CDU	Majority	1,468	4.3				

=== 2014 election ===
State election (2014): Görlitz 3
Notes:	Blue background denotes the winner of the electorate vote. Pink background denotes a candidate elected from their party list. Yellow background denotes an electorate win by a list member, or other incumbent. A ✓ or ✗ denotes status of any incumbent, win or lose respectively.						
Party	Candidate	Votes	%	±%	Party votes	%	±%
CDU	Heinz Lehmann	10,825	40.7		10,966	41.0	
Left		4,709	17.7		4,459	16.7	
AfD		4,036	15.2		3,912	14.6	
SPD		2,244	8.4		2,372	8.9	
Greens		1,805	6.8		951	3.6	
NPD		1,426	5.4		1,516	5.7	
FDP		1,267	4.8		1,176	4.4	
FW					723	2.7	
APT					239	0.9	
Pirates		292	1.1		195	0.7	
PARTEI					101	0.4	
Pro Germany Citizens' Movement					60	0.2	
DSU					58	0.2	
BüSo					41	0.2	
Informal votes		635			470		
Total valid votes		26,604			26,769		
Turnout		27,239	50.5	▼2.2			
CDU win new seat	Majority	6,116	23.0				

== See also ==
- Politics of Saxony
- Landtag of Saxony
