= Neugersdorf =

- Ortsteil of Ebersbach-Neugersdorf
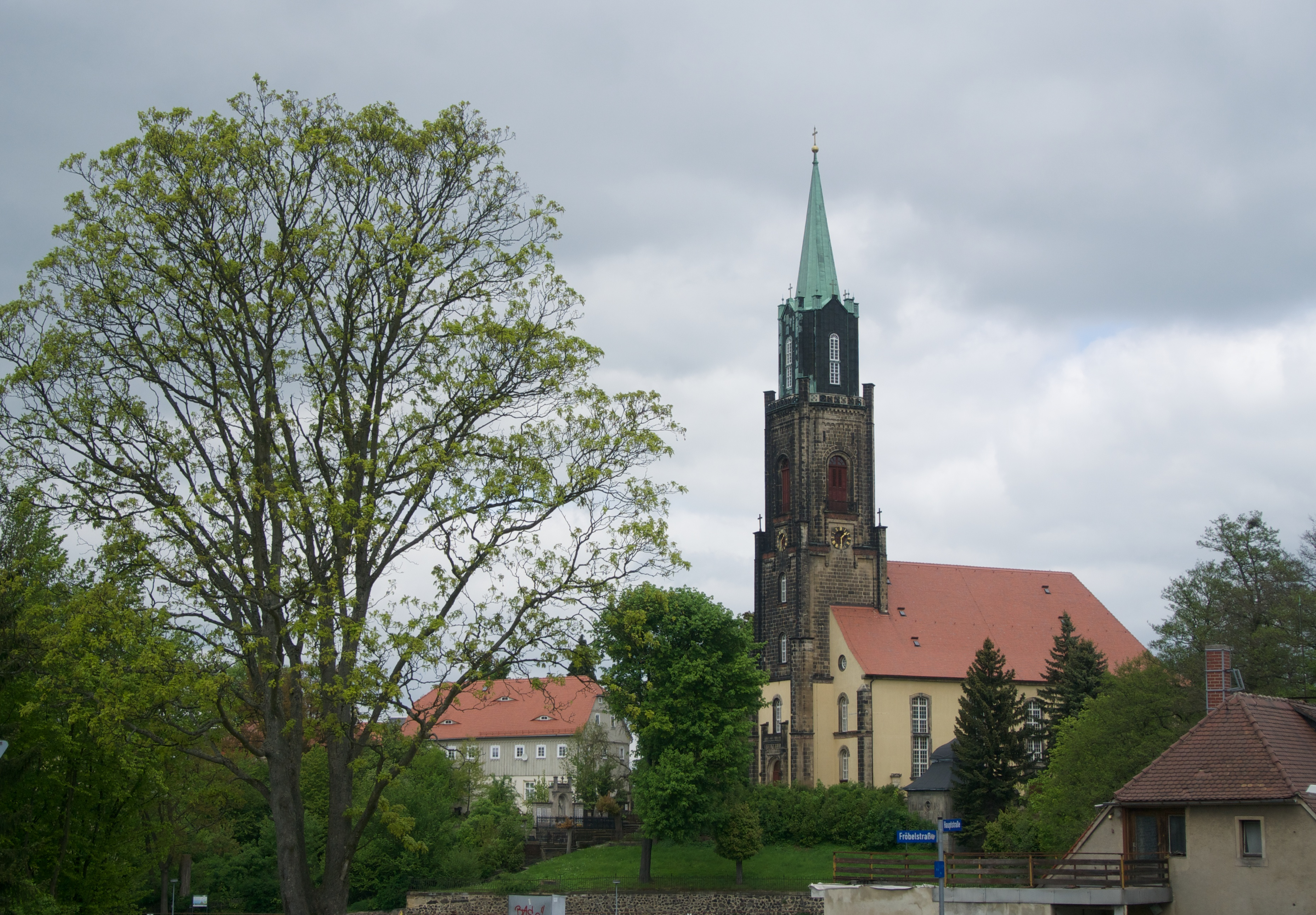
- Lutheran church

- Coat of arms
- Interactive map of Neugersdorf
- Location within Germany Location within Saxony
- Coordinates: 50°58′44″N 14°36′39″E
- Country: Germany
- State: Saxony
- District: Görlitz
- Town: Ebersbach-Neugersdorf

Area
  - Total: 5.53 km^{2} (2.14 sq mi)
- Elevation: 433 m (1,421 ft)

Population (2009-12-31)
  - Total: 5,978
  - Density: 1,080/km^{2} (2,800/sq mi)
- Time zone: UTC+01:00 (CET)
  - Summer (DST): UTC+02:00 (CEST)
- Postal codes: 02727
- Dialling codes: 03586
- Vehicle registration: GR
- Website: www.ebersbach-neugersdorf.de

Neugersdorf (German pronunciation: [ˌnɔʏˈɡɛʁsdɔʁf]; Upper Sorbian: Nowe Jěžercy, pronounced [ˈnɔwɛ ˈjɪʒɛʁtsɨ]) is a town in the district Görlitz, in the Free State of Saxony, Germany. It is situated on the border with the Czech Republic, 4 km south of Ebersbach, and 17 km northwest of Zittau.

Since 1 January 2011, it has been a part of the Ebersbach-Neugersdorf municipality for administrative purposes. It has many wooded areas and country trails.

== Notable residents ==
- Margot Dreschel (1908–1945), Nazi concentration camp guard executed for war crimes
