= Plaston =

Plaston Holding AG
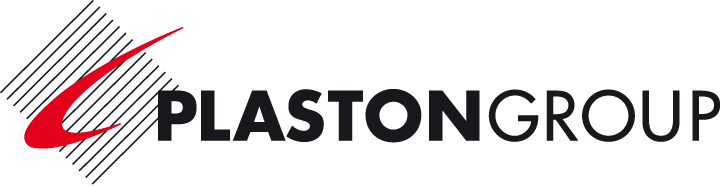
- Company type: Stock corporation
- Industry: Plastics processing, consumer goods industry
- Founded: 1956
- Headquarters: Widnau St.Gallen, Switzerland
- Key people: Markus Bormann (CEO); Roland Frei (Chairman)
- Revenue: 78.3 million CHF
- Number of employees: 355 (March 31, 2012)
- Website: http://www.plaston.com

Plaston Holding AG Widnau is a company with headquarters in Widnau in the Swiss Rhine Valley of the Canton of St.Gallen which is active in the field of plastics processing. As a Group, Plaston is divided into two business units: Air Treatment Systems (ATS), which produces and markets air treatment systems such as humidifiers and air washers, and Industrial Plastic Systems (IPS), which manufactures customer specific plastic cases for the power tool and surveying industries. Plaston is one of the leading providers of plastic packing systems and air treatment systems. Its air treatment systems are sold under the Boneco and Air-O-Swiss brands, and the cases under the Plaston brand. Mr. BoxX is portable and stackable case system which is marketed under its own brand name.

The company operates production sites in Switzerland, in Sluknov the Czech Republic, and Jiaxing in China, as well as a distribution site in the United States.
