= Lipová (Děčín District) =

- Municipality
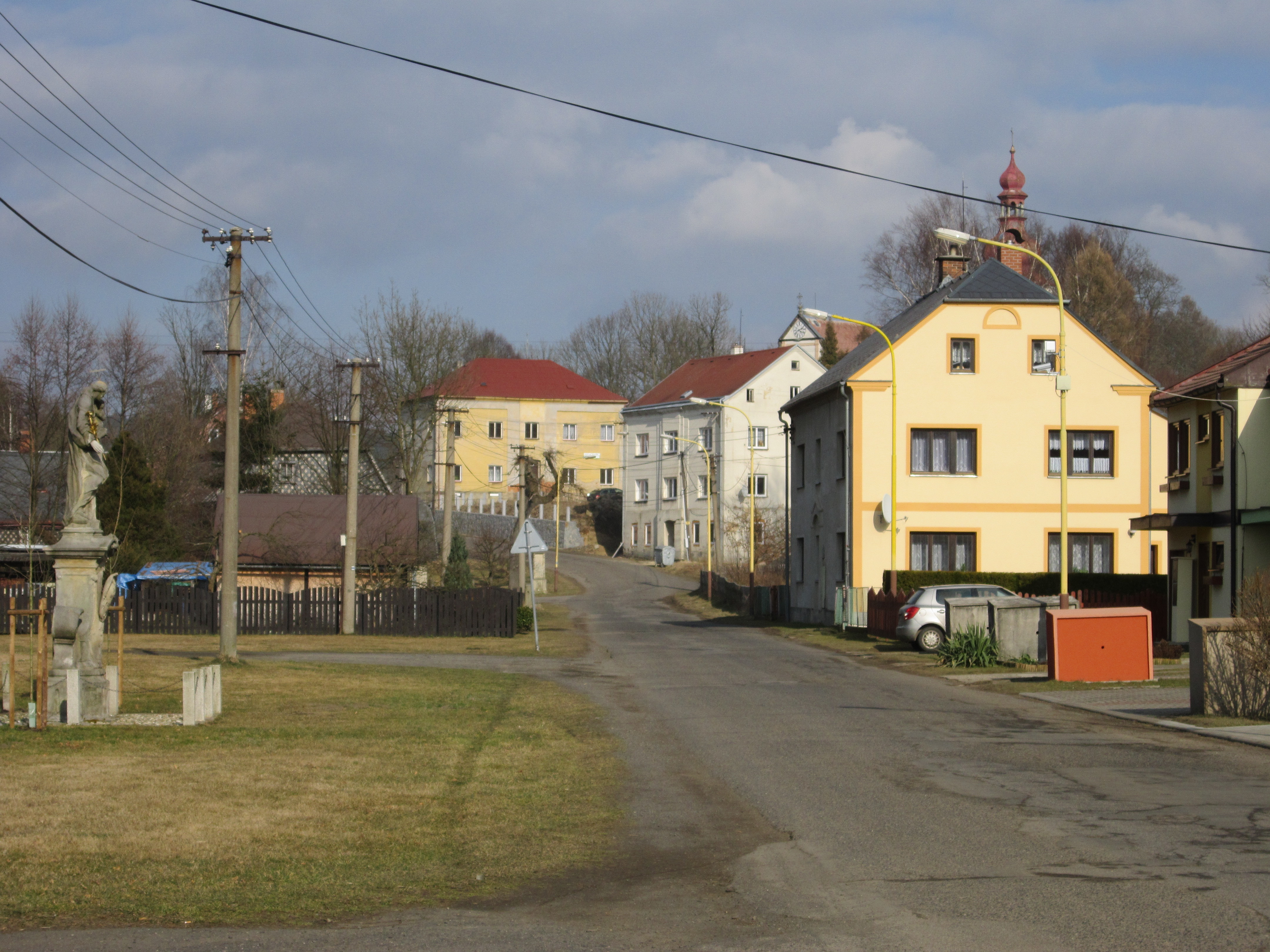
- Centre of Lipová

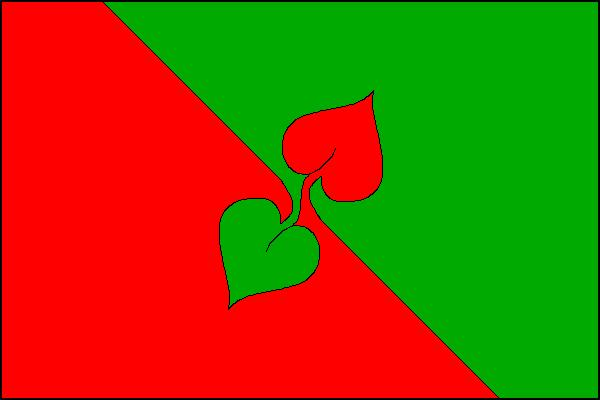
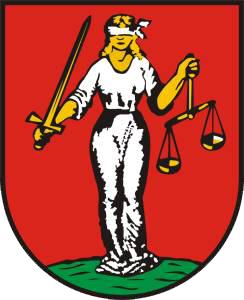
- Flag Coat of arms

- Location in the Czech Republic
- Coordinates: 51°0′40″N 14°21′37″E
- Country: Czech Republic
- Region: Ústí nad Labem
- District: Děčín
- First mentioned: 1344

Area
  - Total: 12.83 km^{2} (4.95 sq mi)
- Elevation: 366 m (1,201 ft)

Population (2026-01-01)
  - Total: 582
  - Density: 45.4/km^{2} (117/sq mi)
- Time zone: UTC+1 (CET)
  - Summer (DST): UTC+2 (CEST)
- Postal code: 407 81
- Website: www.lipova.cz

Lipová (until 1948 Haňšpach; German: Hainspach) is a municipality and village in Děčín District in the Ústí nad Labem Region of the Czech Republic. It has about 600 inhabitants.

== Administrative division ==
Lipová consists of two municipal parts (in brackets population according to the 2021 census):

- Lipová (636)
- Liščí (3)

== Etymology ==
The initial German name Hainspach meant "Hain's stream" and referred to the local watercourse. The Czech names Hanšpach and Haňšpach were created by transcription of the German name. In 1948, the name of the municipality was changed from Haňšpach to Lipová. Lipová is an adjective derived from the Czech word lípa ('linden').

== Geography ==
Lipová is located about 29 kilometres (18 mi) northeast of Děčín and 44 km (27 mi) northeast of Ústí nad Labem. It lies in the salient region of Šluknov Hook, on the border with Germany. It borders the German municipalities of Steinigtwolmsdorf and Sohland an der Spree. It is situated in the Lusatian Highlands. The highest point of Lipová is the hill Ječný vrch at 502 m (1,647 ft) above sea level. The stream Liščí potok originates here and flows across the municipality. The village of Lipová lies on the shore of the fishpond Zámecký rybník. The second notable pond in the municipal territory is Solandský rybník.

== History ==
The first written mention of Haňšpach is from 1344, when the village was owned by the Berka of Dubá family as part of the Tolštejn estate.

== Demographics ==
Historical population

Year	Pop.	±%
1869	2,978	—
1880	3,169	+6.4%
1890	3,186	+0.5%
1900	3,323	+4.3%
1910	3,391	+2.0%

Year	Pop.	±%
1921	2,867	−15.5%
1930	2,963	+3.3%
1950	987	−66.7%
1961	1,029	+4.3%
1970	981	−4.7%

Year	Pop.	±%
1980	753	−23.2%
1991	627	−16.7%
2001	650	+3.7%
2011	670	+3.1%
2021	639	−4.6%

Source: Censuses

== Economy ==
The municipality suffers from its location in Šluknov Hook at the periphery of the Czech Republic. The region has persistently high unemployment rate, low supply of services and poor quality of healthcare.

== Transport ==
There are no railways or major roads passing through the municipality. On the Czech–German border is the road broder crossing Lipová / Sohland.

== Sights ==
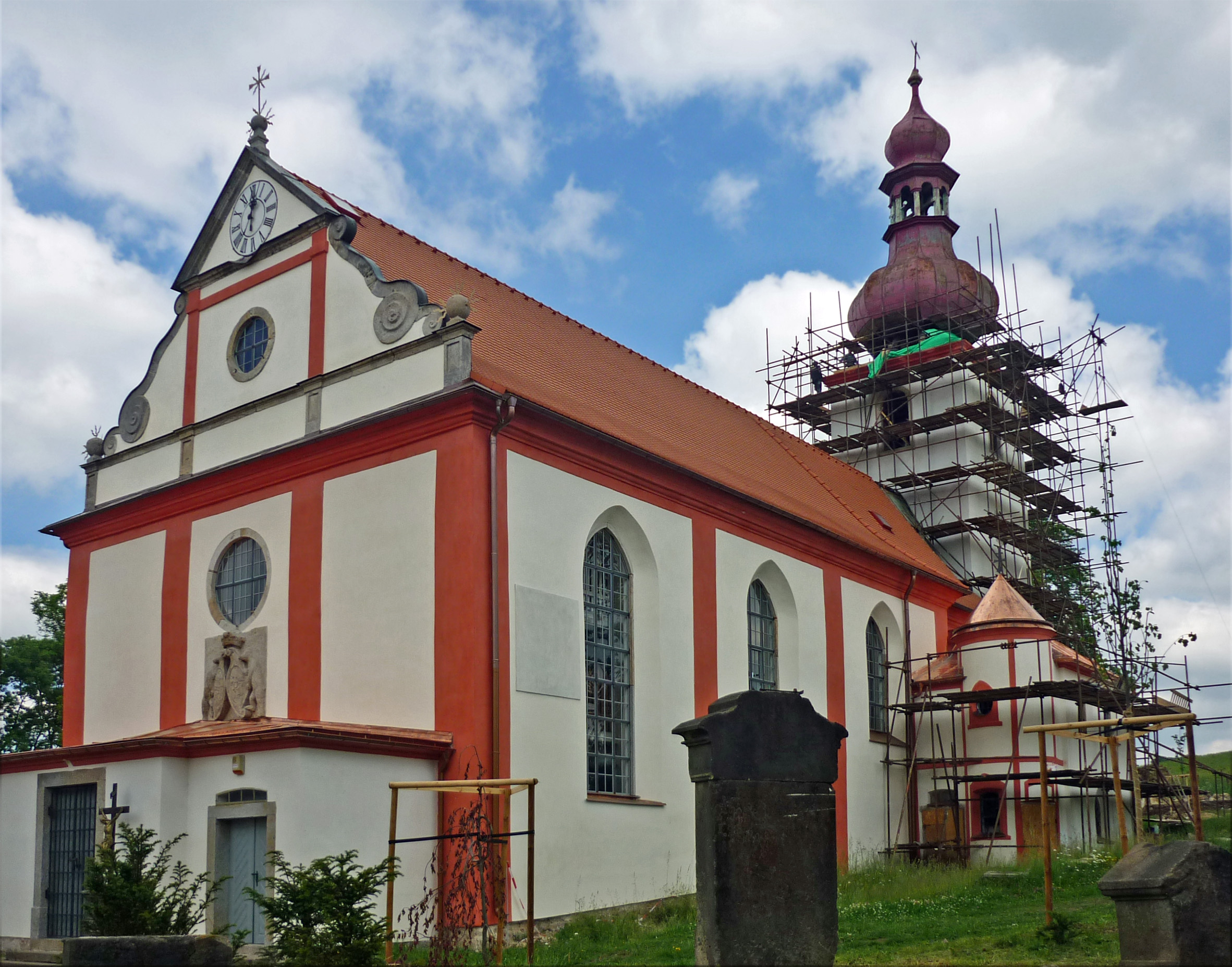
Church of Saints Simon and Jude

The main landmark of Lipová is the Church of Saints Simon and Jude, built in the Baroque style in 1691–1695. The tower was added in 1781.

Lipová Castle was built in 1736–1738. Today it is a ruin. It is surrounded by a park.
