= Franz Xaver Chwatal =

Czech pianist and composer (1808–1879)

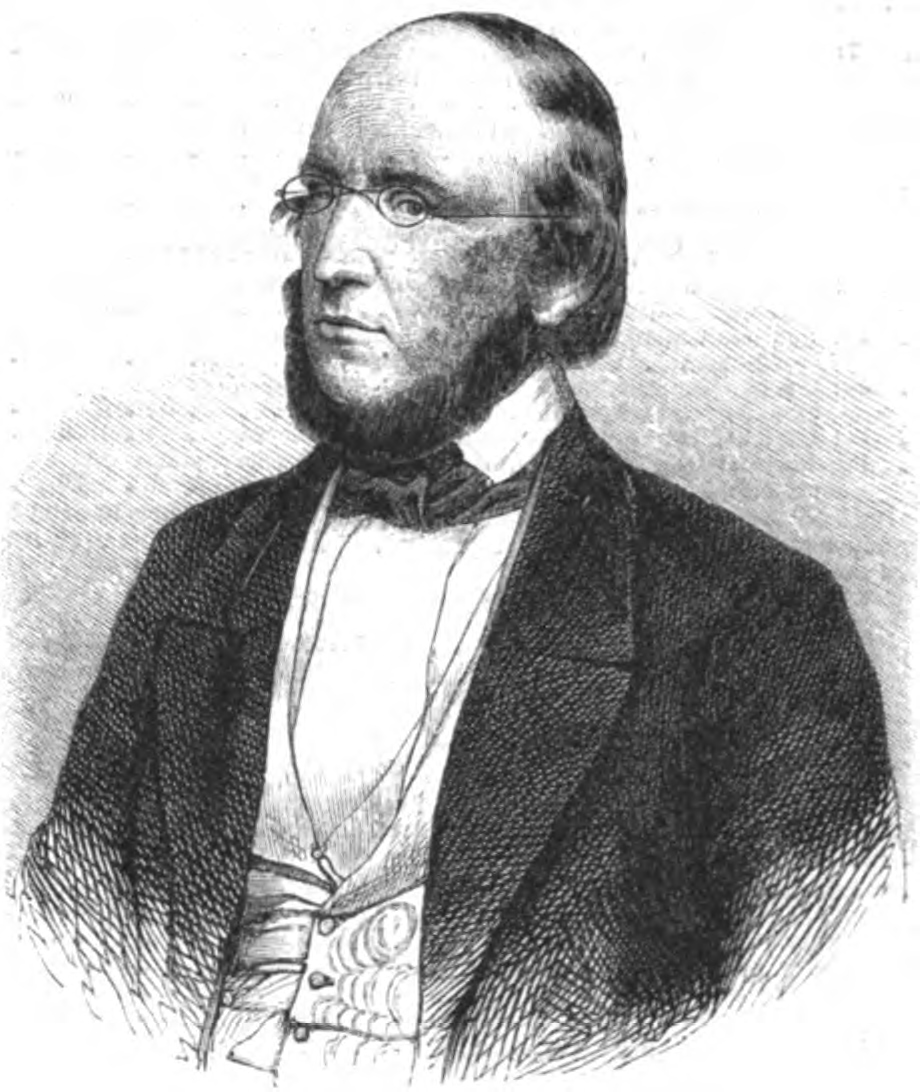
- Chwatal in 1861
- Born: 19 June 1808; Rumburk, Bohemia
- Died: 24 June 1879 (aged 71); Elmen, Austria-Hungary
- Era: Romantic

Franz Xaver Chwatal (19 June 1808 – 24 June 1879) was a Czech pianist, composer and music teacher.

== Life ==
Chwatal was born in Rumburk, Bohemia (in the modern Czech Republic). He was the son of an organ builder, who gave him piano lessons as a child. From 1822 to 1832, he worked as a music teacher in Merseburg, where he created his first compositions. From 1835, he worked as a music teacher in Magdeburg. In the 1850s, he travelled with Christian Friedrich Ehrlich to the Institute für Gemeinschaftlichen Clavierunterricht (Institute for Community Piano Lessons).

He composed numerous pieces of music. However, these compositions have had a reputation as lighter, popular music. The German music critic Robert Schumann called them "Stübchenmusik" (parlour music).

== Selected works ==
- Historischer Notizkalender für Musiker und Musikfreunde (1861)
- Methodisch geordnete Pianoforte-Schule
- Praktische Elementar-Pianoforteschule
- Alpenklänge. Miniatur-Bilder für das Pianoforte.
- Nacht, o Nacht, du heilge Nacht, choral song with Wilhelmine von Chezy
