= Rumburk rebellion =

1918 mutiny by Czech soldiers

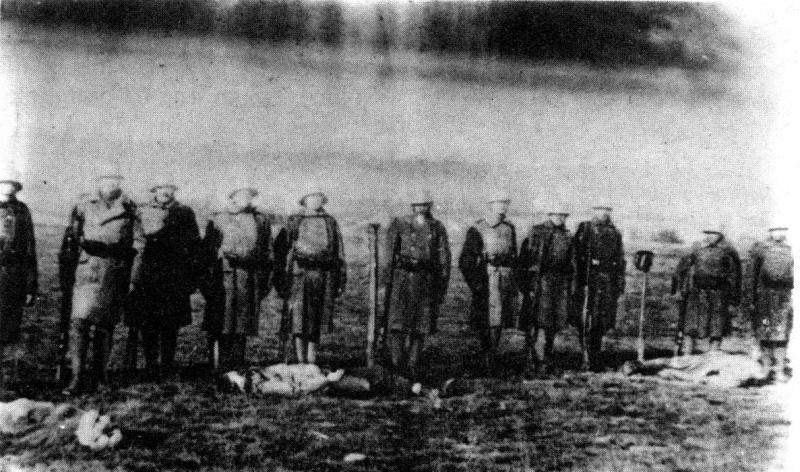
Execution of three of the leaders of the mutiny: František Noha, Stanko Vodička, and Vojtěch Kovář

The Rumburk rebellion was a mutiny by Czech soldiers in the Austro-Hungarian Army during the First World War. It took place on 21 May 1918 in the town of Rumburk in North Bohemia.

== The revolt ==
The Czech soldiers were former prisoners of the Imperial Russian Army. The revolt began on 21 May 1918, after 6 o'clock in the morning, when 65 men, led by František Noha, refused to obey his commanders: he armed himself with a rifle. Several soldiers were added to the rebellion, the total number was about 700. Although the revolt broke out spontaneously, its leaders quickly established contact with Czech soldiers from the 18th Infantry Regiment of Hradec Králové, who were stationed in Česká Lípa. Only this could translate the revolt into other areas, which could have grown into a revolution that had fallen in the Czech lands. The rebels initially captured the town of Rumburk and then marched on Nový Bor. Here they were surrounded by troops of the Austro-Hungarian army, including the 18th Infantry Regiment of Hradec Králové. Around 1,000 – 1,200 mutineers were defeated and most of them were captures.

== The consequences ==
Ten mutineers were sentenced to death and executed: František Noha, Stanko Vodička, and Vojtěch Kovář were shot on the morning of 29 May 1918, with Jakub Bernard, Jiří Kovářík, Jakub Nejdl, František Pour, Jan Pelnář, Antonín Šťastný and Jindřich Švehla being executed that evening. A further fourteen mutineers were given long prison sentences.

The prisoners were incarcerated in the Small Fortress at Terezín, a prison used by the Austro-Hungarian authorities for political prisoners.

== Memorials ==
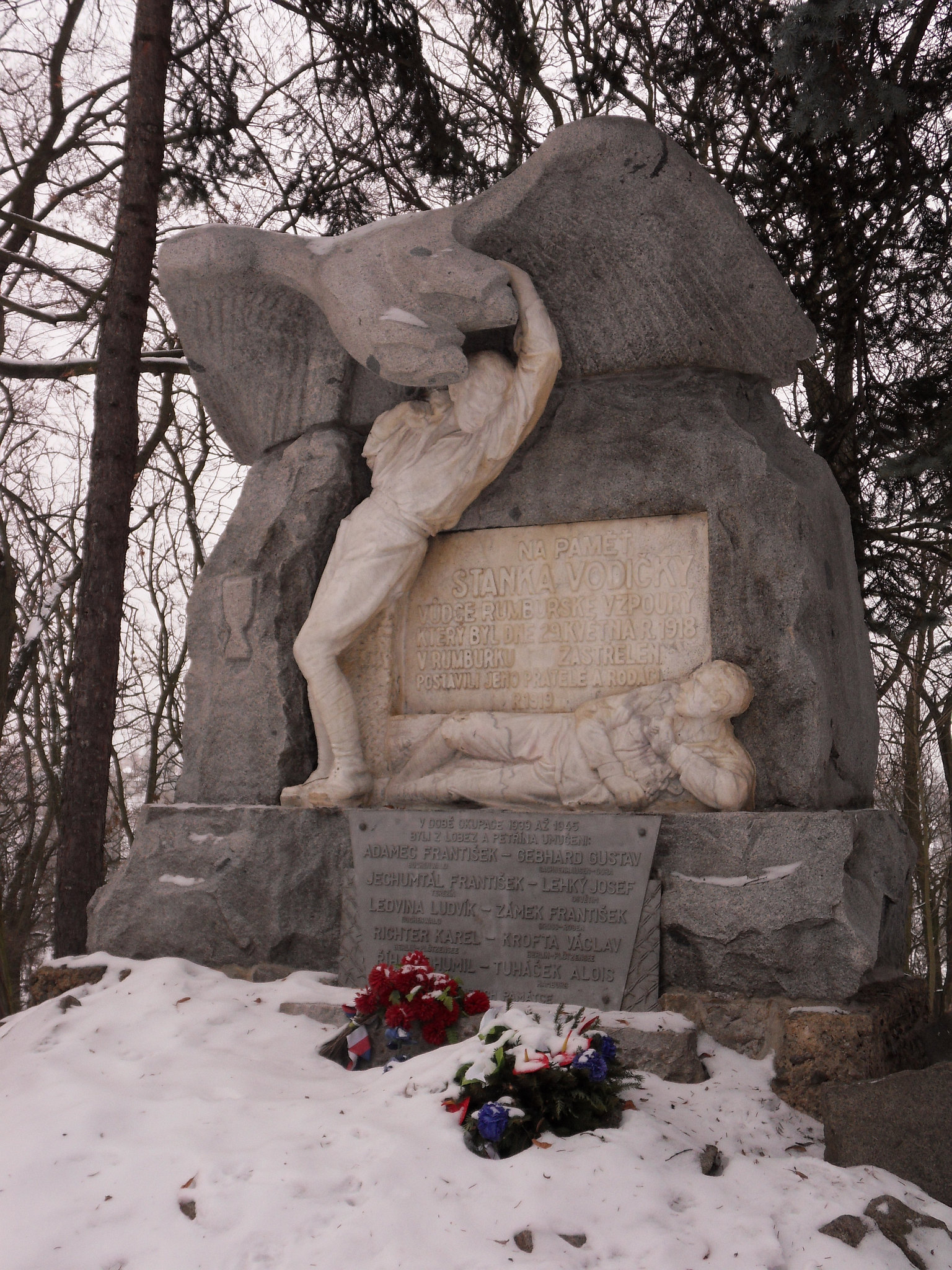
Memorial to Stanko Vodička, Lobzy, Plzeň

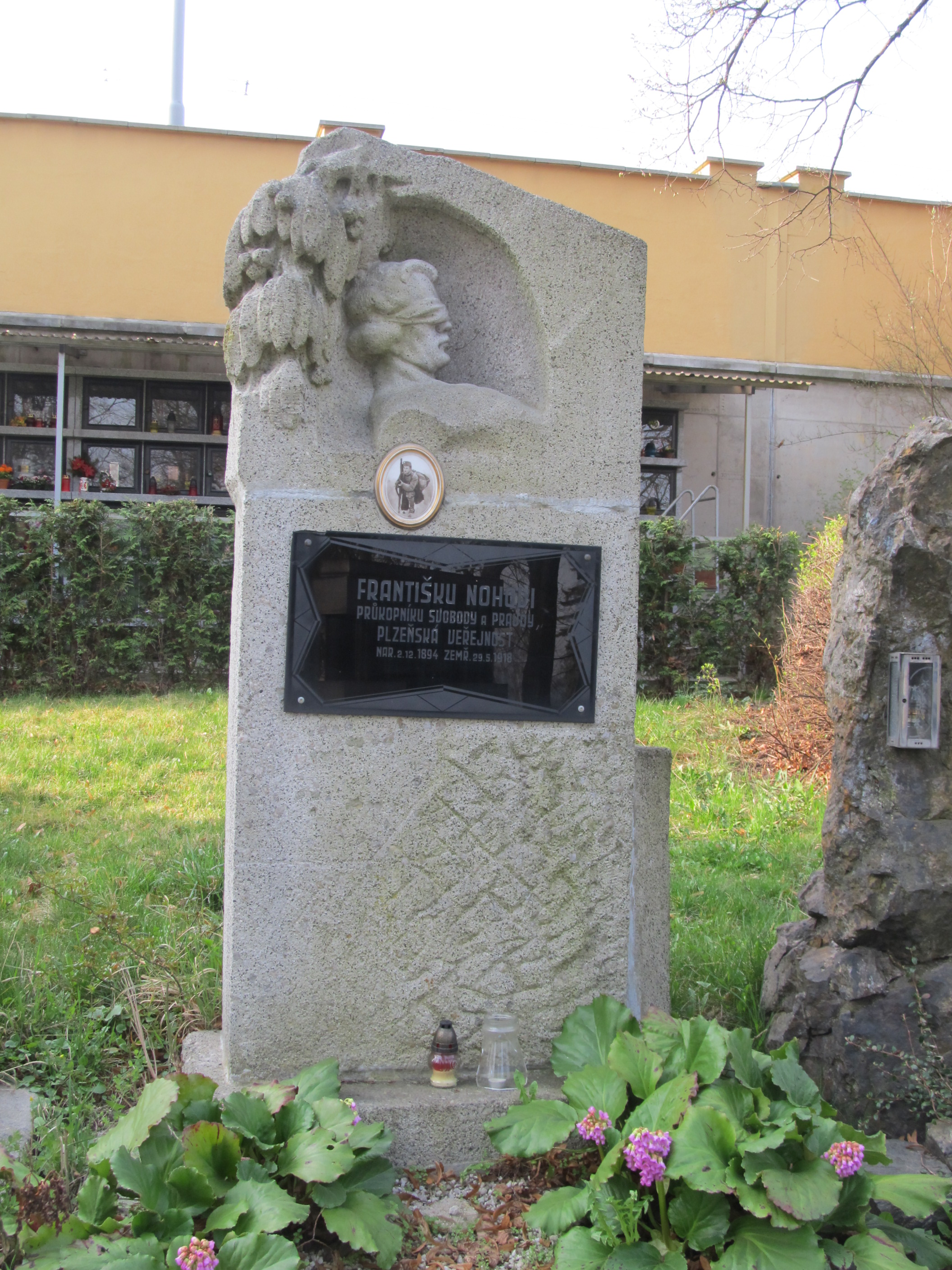
Gravestone of František Noha, Plzeň

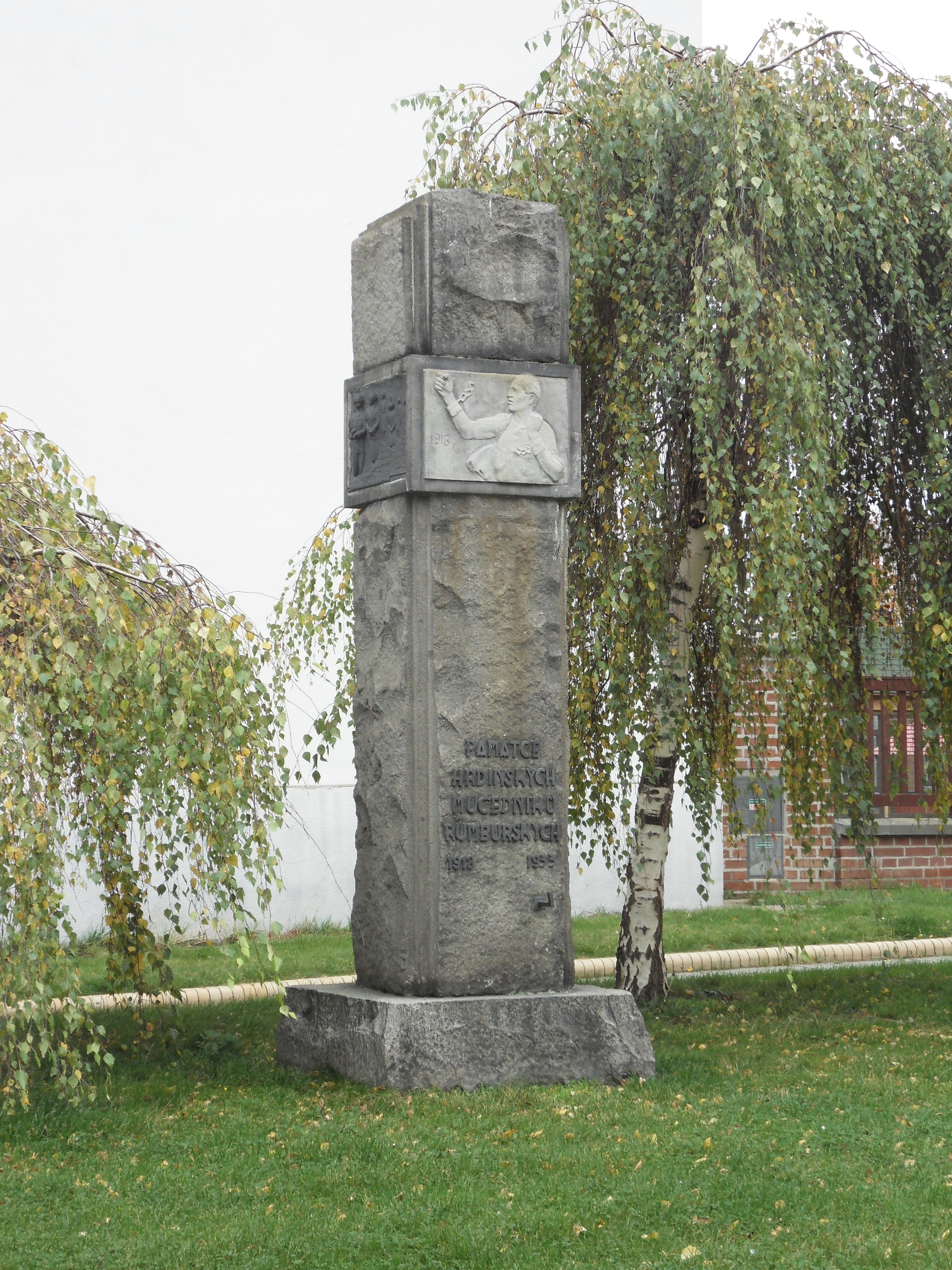
Monument to the mutineers, Plzeň

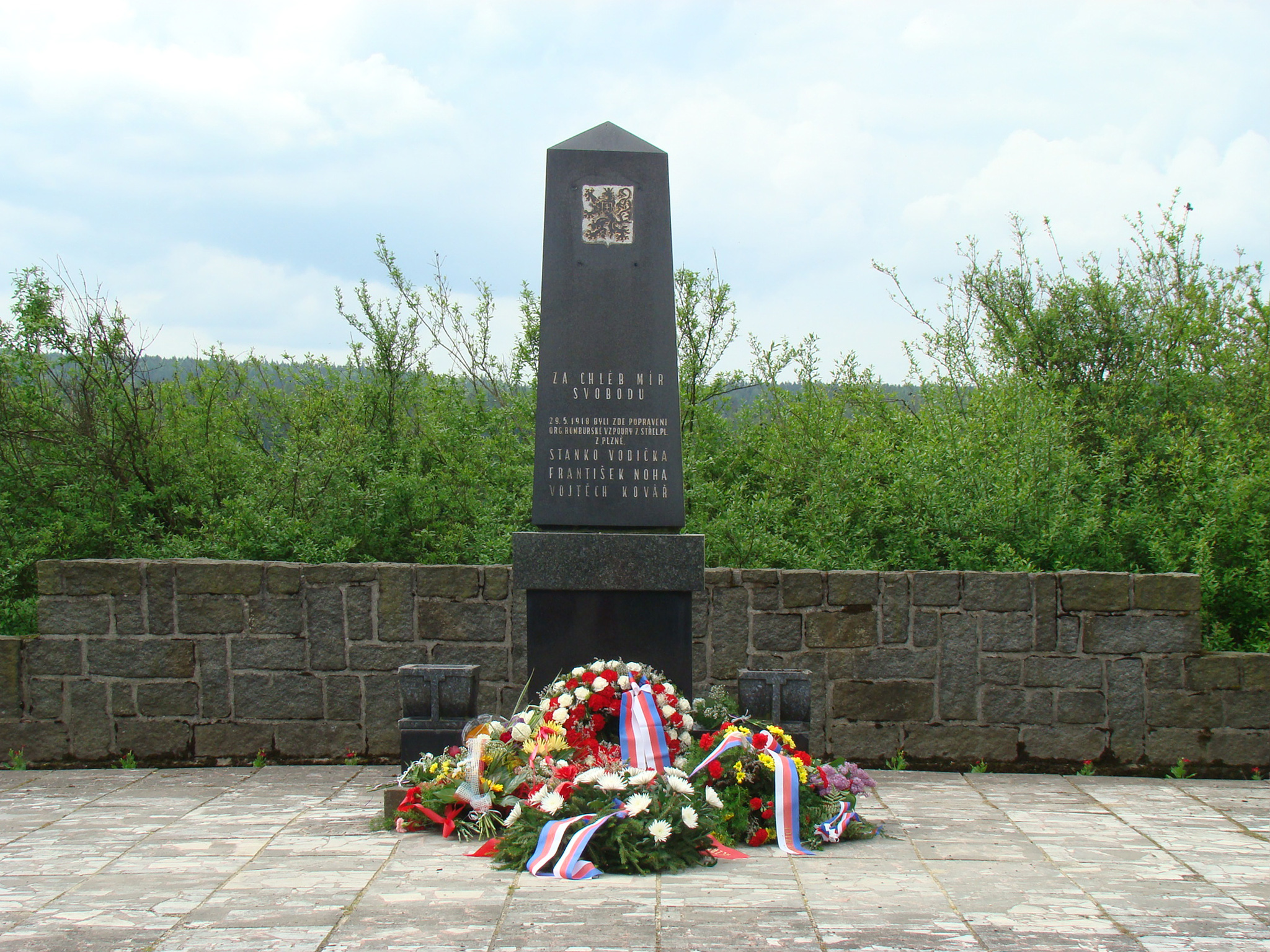
Monument to the mutineers, Rumburk

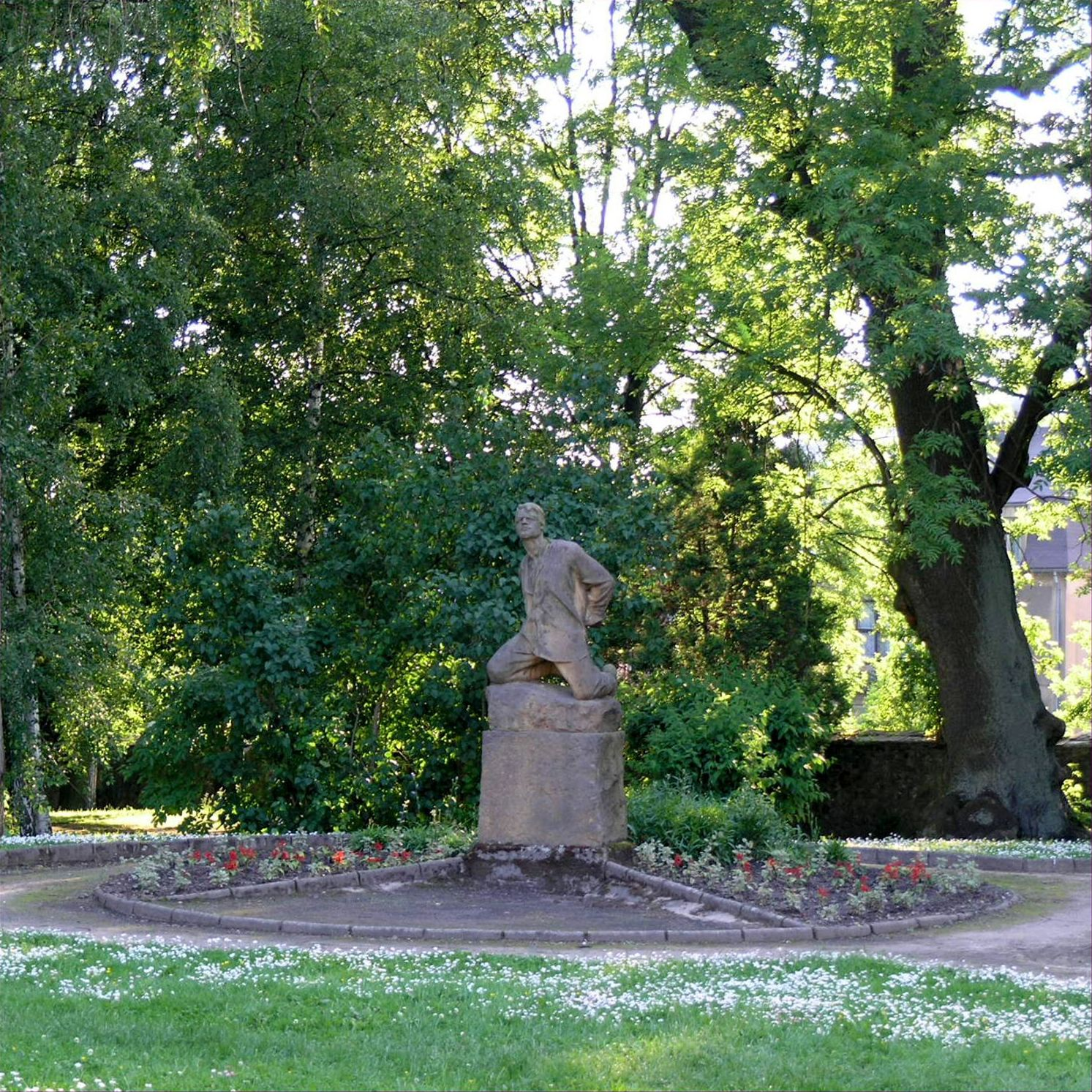
Monument to the mutineers, Rumburk

There is also a street named after Vojtěch Kovář in Rumburk.
