= Klunst =

Mountain in Germany

Coordinates: 51°00′55″N 14°35′27″E

Highest point
- Elevation: 440 m (1,440 ft)

Geography
- Location: Saxony, Germany

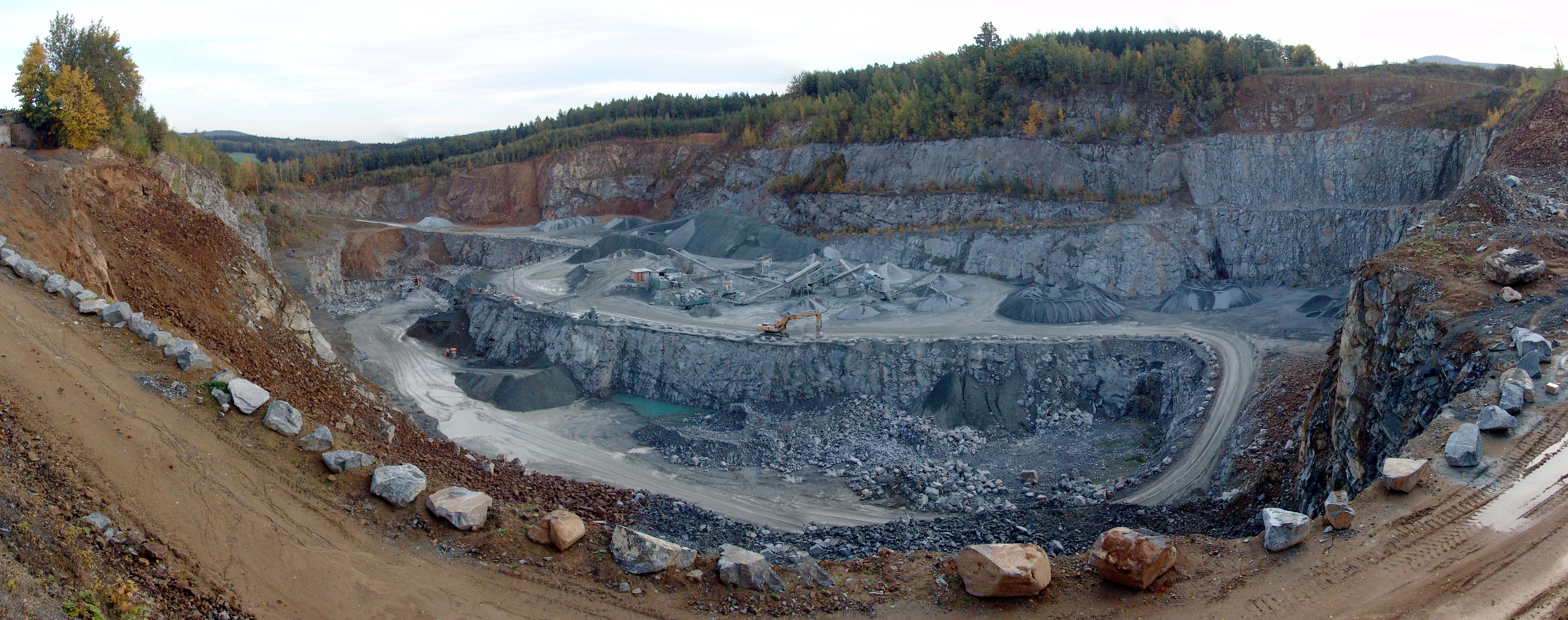
The Klunst quarry in Ebersbach, Saxony

Klunst was a mountain in Ebersbach, Görlitz in Saxony, southeastern Germany. It used to be 440 meters high. In the early 20th century It turned into a granite quarry.
