= Ebersbach-Neugersdorf =

- Town
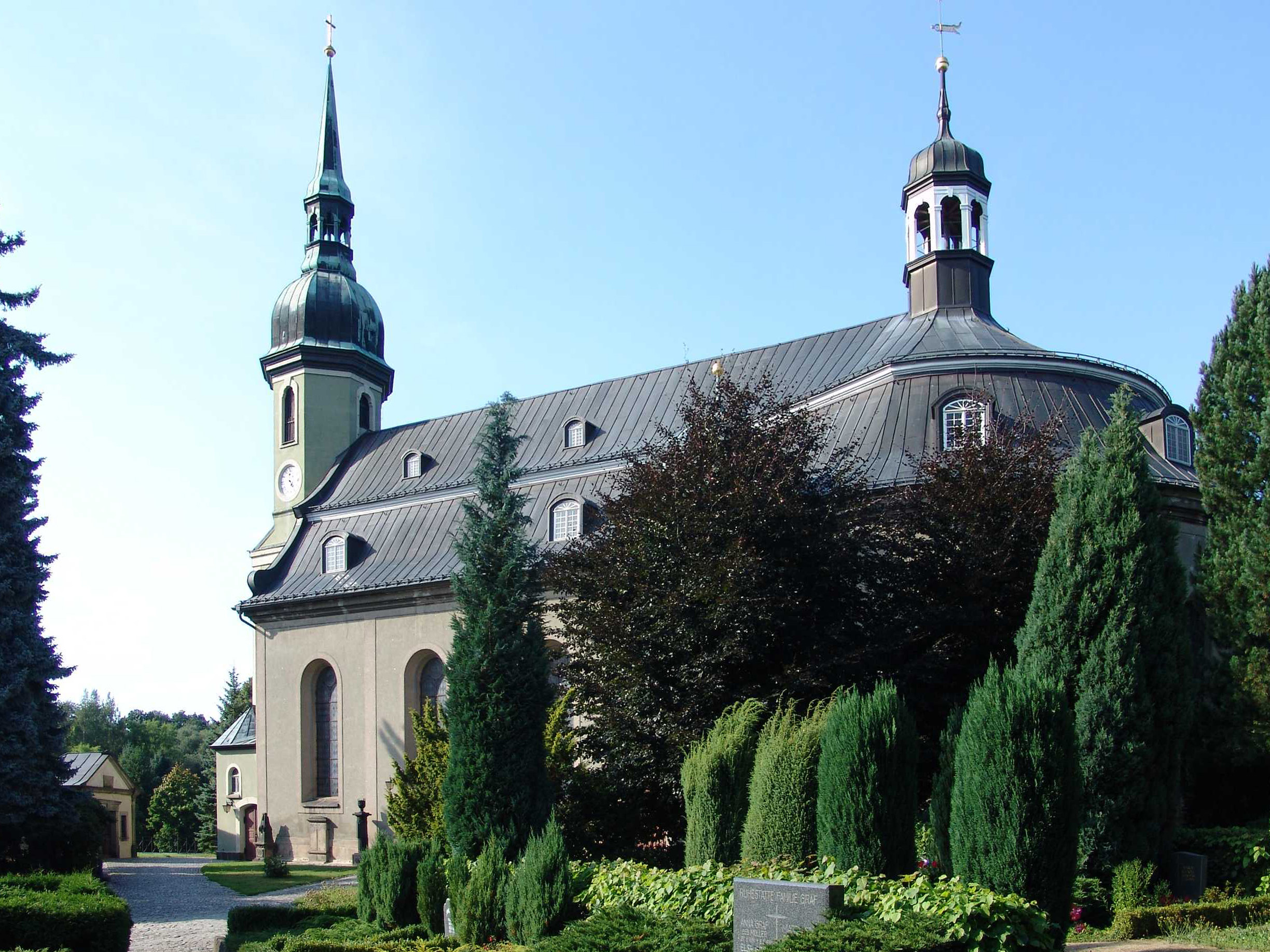
- Baroque church in Ebersbach

- Coat of arms

- Location of Ebersbach-Neugersdorf within Görlitz district
- Interactive map of Ebersbach-Neugersdorf
- Location within Germany Location within Saxony
- Coordinates: 51°0′N 14°36′E
- Country: Germany
- State: Saxony
- District: Görlitz

Government
  - Mayor (2018–25): Verena Hergenröder (Ind.)

Area
  - Total: 20.45 km^{2} (7.90 sq mi)

Population (2025-12-31)
  - Total: 10,749
  - Density: 525.6/km^{2} (1,361/sq mi)
- Time zone: UTC+01:00 (CET)
  - Summer (DST): UTC+02:00 (CEST)
- Postal codes: 02727, 02730
- Dialling codes: 03586
- Vehicle registration: GR, LÖB, NOL, NY, WSW, ZI
- Website: www.ebersbach-neugersdorf.de

Ebersbach-Neugersdorf (German pronunciation: [ˈeːbɐsbax ˌnɔʏˈɡɛʁsdɔʁf]; Lower Sorbian: Habrachćicy-Nowe Jěžercy) is a town in the district of Görlitz, in Saxony, Germany. It is situated on the border with the Czech Republic, just across from the Czech town of Jiříkov. It was formed on 1 January 2011 by the merger of the former municipalities of Ebersbach and Neugersdorf.
