= Lusatian Highlands =

Coordinates: 51°04′30″N 14°16′42″E

- German: Lausitzer Bergland; Polish: Pogórze Łużyckie; Czech: Šluknovská pahorkatina
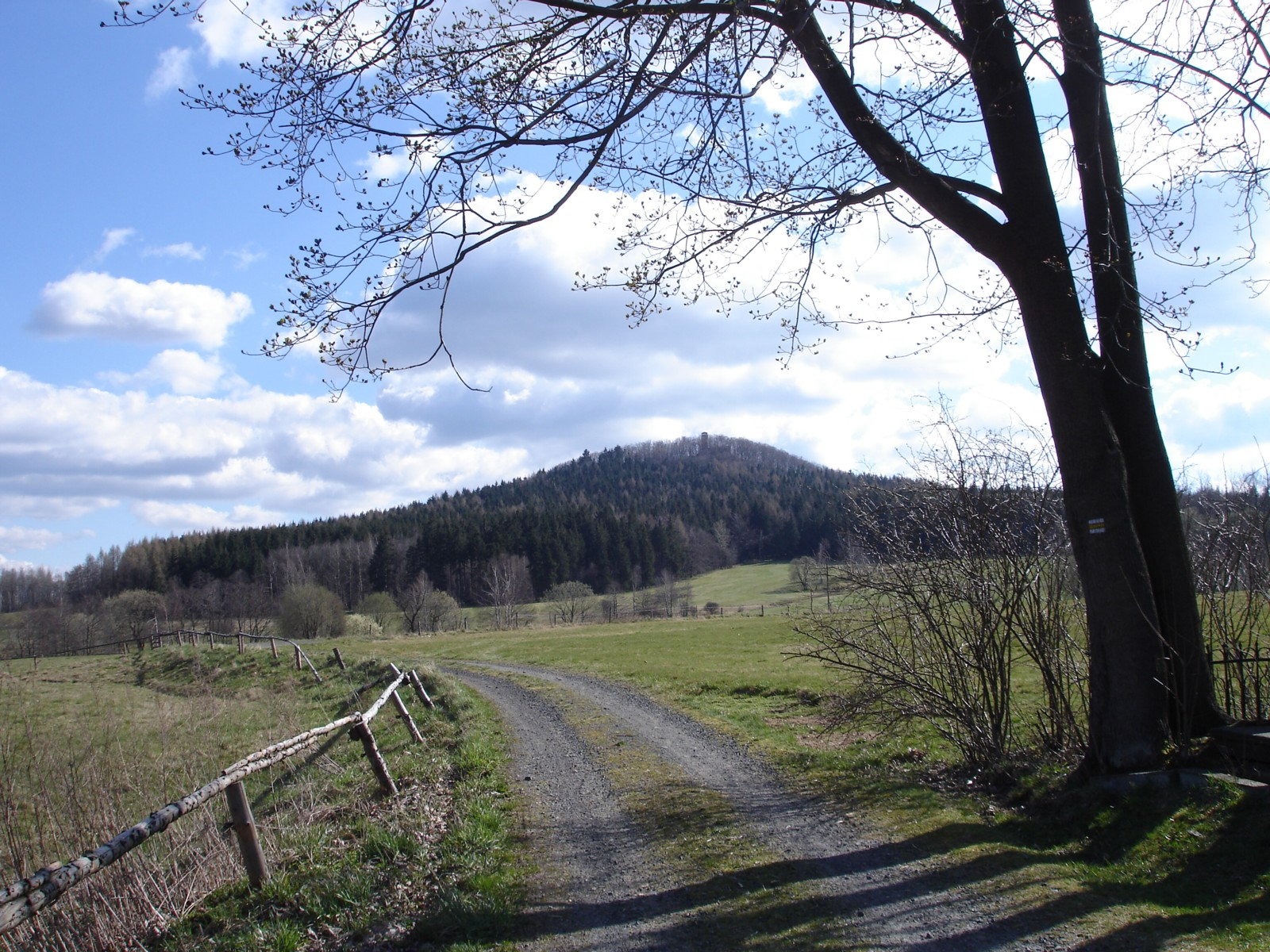
- Vlčí hora near Rumburk

Highest point
- Peak: Hrazený
- Elevation: 608 m (1,995 ft)

Geography
- Divisions of the Sudetes
- Countries: Germany; Czech Republic
- States: Saxony; Bohemia
- Parent range: Sudetes

Geology
- Rock type: Granite

The Lusatian Highlands or Lusatian Hills (German: Lausitzer Bergland [ˈlaʊzɪtsɐ ˈbɛʁkˌlant]; Czech: Šluknovská pahorkatina (for the Czech part only); Upper Sorbian: Łužiske hory) form a hilly region in Germany and the Czech Republic. A western extension of the Sudetes range, it is located on the border of the German state of Saxony with the Czech Bohemian region. It is one of the eight natural landscapes of Upper Lusatia.

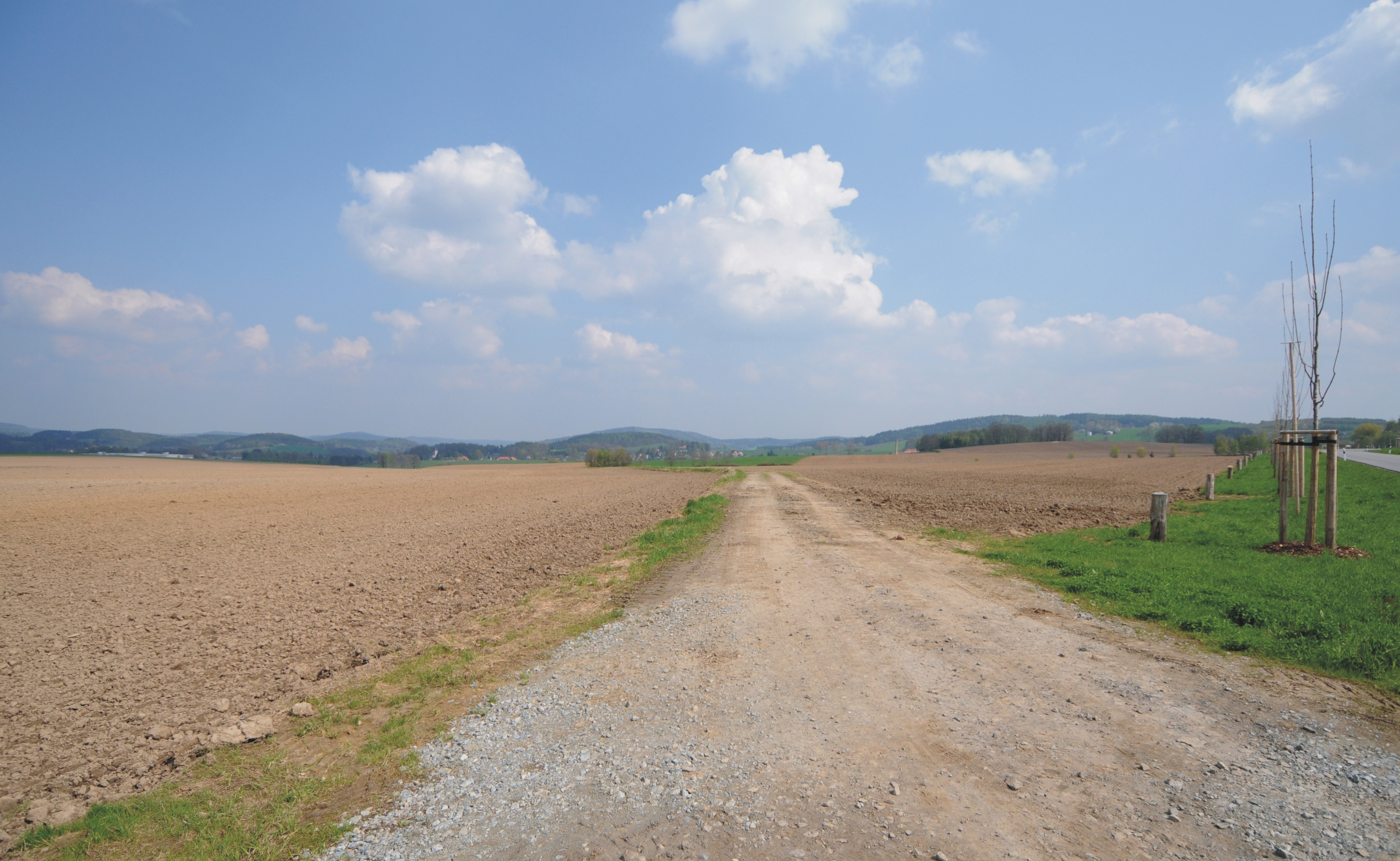
Sohland an der Spree in the Lusatian Highlands

The Lusatian Highlands are named after the historic region of Upper Lusatia, while the southern Czech portion is also known as the Šluknov Hook. The hills are situated between the Elbe Sandstone Mountains to the west and the somewhat higher Lusatian Mountains and the Zittau Mountains to the east. The source of the river Spree, which runs through central Berlin, is located near the small town of Ebersbach.

The Lusatian Highlands are a famous tourist region that is portrayed in several movies. They are known for the beauty of the landscape and their picturesque towns with Baroque churches and wooden houses. Popular tourist towns in the region are Schirgiswalde, also known as the capital of carnival in Upper Lusatia, Šluknov with its famous arboretum, and Rumburk with a medieval old town centre. Other notable towns include Ebersbach, Velký Šenov, Neukirch/Lausitz, Sohland an der Spree and Kirschau.

== See also ==
- List of regions of Saxony
- Lusatian Mountains
