= Ebersbach, Görlitz =

Ebersbach
- Ortsteil of Ebersbach-Neugersdorf
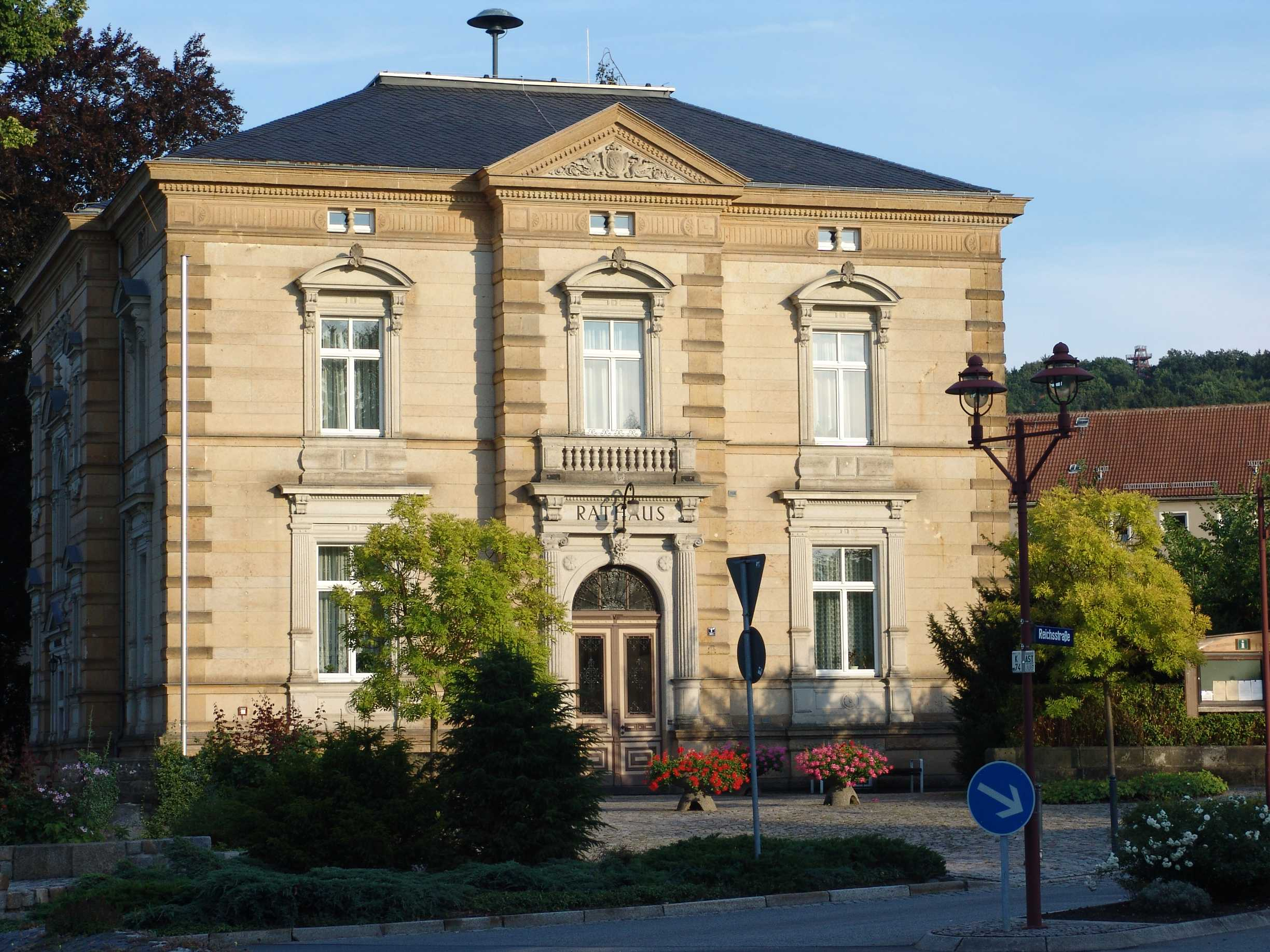
- Town hall

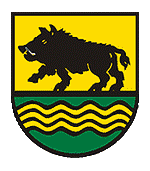
- Coat of arms
- Interactive map of Ebersbach
- Location within Germany Location within Saxony
- Coordinates: 51°0′30″N 14°35′7″E
- Country: Germany
- State: Saxony
- District: Görlitz
- Town: Ebersbach-Neugersdorf

Area
  - Total: 14.89 km^{2} (5.75 sq mi)
- Elevation: 382 m (1,253 ft)

Population (2009-12-31)
  - Total: 8,108
  - Density: 544.5/km^{2} (1,410/sq mi)
- Time zone: UTC+01:00 (CET)
  - Summer (DST): UTC+02:00 (CEST)
- Postal codes: 02730
- Dialling codes: 03586

Ebersbach (German pronunciation: [ˈeːbɐsbax]; Upper Sorbian: Habrachćicy) is a former town in the district Görlitz, in Saxony, Germany. It lies 20 km northwest of Zittau, and 23 km southeast of Bautzen. Since 1 January 2011, it has been part of the town Ebersbach-Neugersdorf. Close to the town is the Klunst granite quarry.

== International relations ==
Ebersbach is twinned with:

- Bourg-lès-Valence, France
- Ebersbach an der Fils, Germany
- Jiříkov, Czech Republic

== Notable people ==
- Antye Greie
- Ivica Račan (1944–2007)
