= Šluknov =

- Town
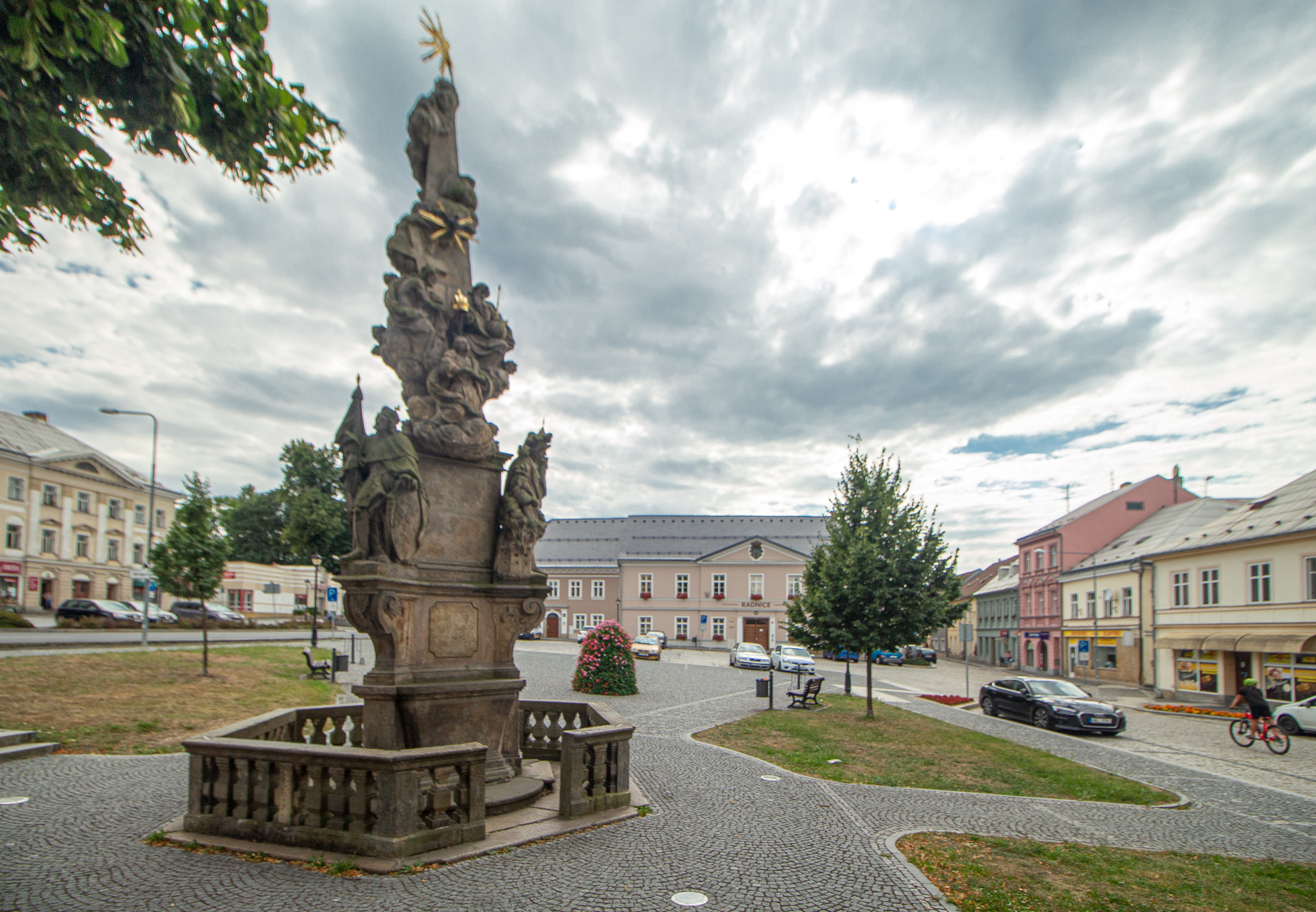
- The square Náměstí Míru with the Column of the Holy Trinity

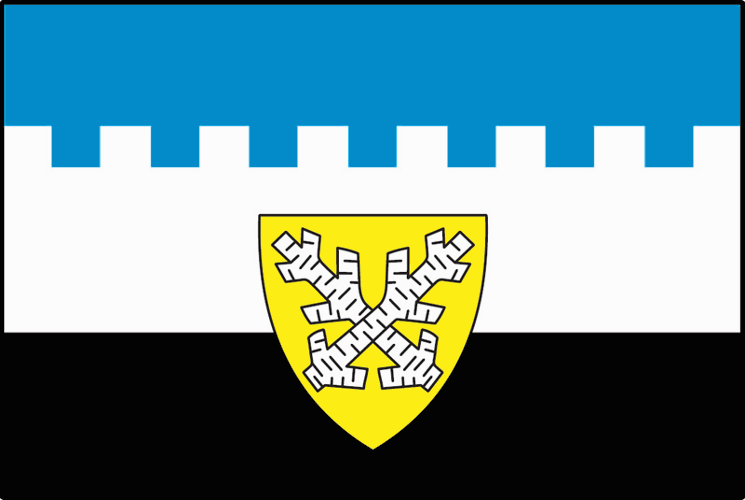
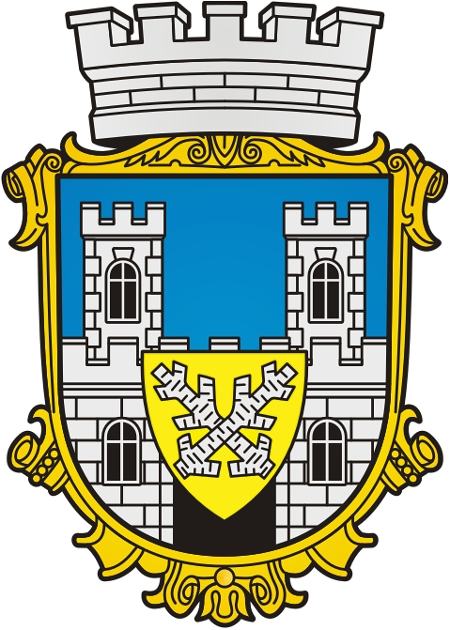
- Flag Coat of arms

- Location in the Czech Republic
- Coordinates: 51°0′14″N 14°27′10″E
- Country: Czech Republic
- Region: Ústí nad Labem
- District: Děčín
- First mentioned: 1281

Government
  - Mayor: Tomáš Kolonečný

Area
  - Total: 47.47 km^{2} (18.33 sq mi)
- Elevation: 340 m (1,120 ft)

Population (2026-01-01)
  - Total: 5,569
  - Density: 117.3/km^{2} (303.8/sq mi)
- Time zone: UTC+1 (CET)
  - Summer (DST): UTC+2 (CEST)
- Postal code: 407 77
- Website: www.mestosluknov.cz

Šluknov (Czech pronunciation: [ˈʃluknof]; German: Schluckenau) is a town in Děčín District in the Ústí nad Labem Region of the Czech Republic. It has about 5,600 inhabitants. It lies in the Lusatian Highlands on the border with Germany, and it is the northernmost town of the country. The location on the periphery of the country is the cause of Šluknov's economic problems.

The historic town centre are well preserved and are protected as an urban monument zone. The most important monuments of Šluknov are the Šluknov Castle and the complex of sacral buildings in the Křížový vrch area.

== Administrative division ==
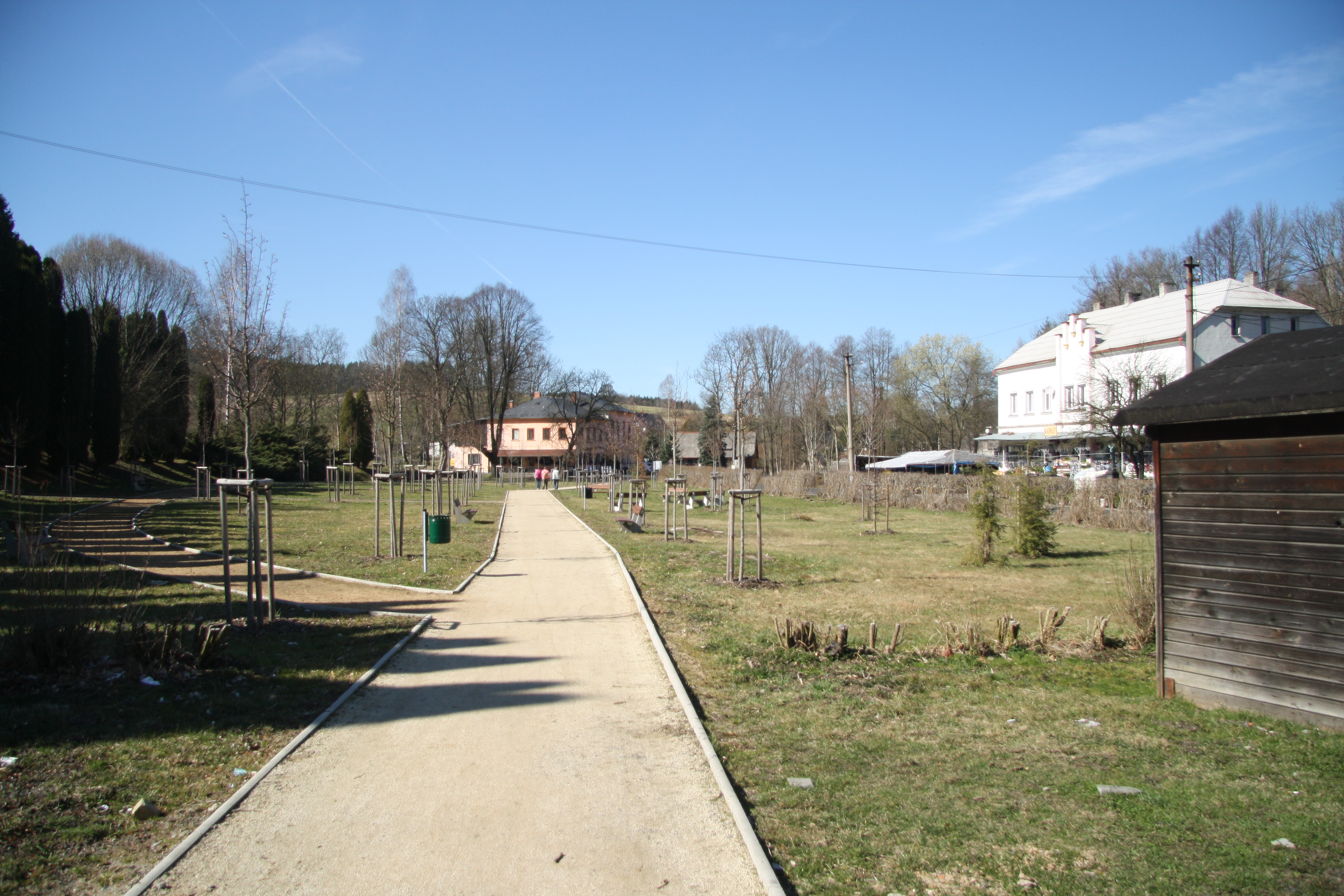
Rožany, a part of Šluknov

Šluknov consists of eight municipal parts (in brackets population according to the 2021 census):

- Šluknov (4,104)
- Císařský (499)
- Harrachov (5)
- Královka (16)
- Království (567)
- Kunratice (37)
- Nové Hraběcí (103)
- Rožany (159)

== Etymology ==
The oldest form of the name is Slaukenowe. The name probably meant "Slávek' meadow".

== Geography ==
Šluknov is located about 30 kilometres (19 mi) northeast of Děčín and 47 km (29 mi) northeast of Ústí nad Labem. It lies in the salient region of Šluknov Hook on the border with Germany. It is the northernmost town of the Czech Republic.

Šluknov is situated in the Lusatian Highlands. The highest point is located on the slopes of the Hrazený mountain at 567 m (1,860 ft) above sea level. The territory of Šluknov is rich in small watercourses; the longest of them is the stream Rožanský potok. Other notable streams are the Lesní potok, which supplies a system of fishponds, and the Stříbrný potok, which flows through the built-up area.

== History ==
=== Early history ===
The first written mention of Šluknov is from 1281. The first owners was the noble family of Berka of Dubá. Under their administration, Šluknov became the administrative and economic centre of the Czech part of their estate. The family's coat of arms is to this day the inescutcheon in the town's coat of arms. In 1359, Šluknov was promoted to a town.

During the reign of King George of Poděbrady, the property of Berkas of Dubá was confiscated and Šluknov was acquired by the Wartenberg family. Next owners of the estate were families of Schleinitz, Mansfeld, Dietrichstein and Harrach. Before the town became independent, the last noble owner of the estate was Count Erwin Leopold Nostitz-Rieneck of the Nostitz-Rieneck family.

Šluknov was struck by many fires, the largest of them were in 1634, 1710 and 1838, when almost the whole town burned down.

During the Thirty Years' War, the town was repeatedly severely damaged by Swedish army. In 1813, the town was plundered by a 100,000 man army during the Napoleonic Wars.

=== 20th century ===
Until 1918, the town was part of Austria-Hungary, head of the district of the same name, one of the 94 Bezirkshauptmannschaften in Bohemia.

In 1930, Šluknov was home to 5,578 inhabitants who were largely ethnic German. Prior to World War II, Šluknov was a centre in Czechoslovakia for the pro-Nazist Sudeten German Party (SdP) led by Konrad Henlein. This was one reason why, in March 1939, Adolf Hitler chose the town as the first stop of the Wehrmacht during the German annexation of Sudetenland. The Wehrmacht continued on to occupy Prague and establish the Protectorate of Bohemia and Moravia.

From 1938 to 1945, the town was annexed to Nazi Germany and administered as part of the Reichsgau Sudetenland. After World War II, the town returned to Czechoslovakia and the German inhabitants were expelled under the terms of Beneš decrees.

== Demographics ==
The town has a significant Romani population.

Historical population

Year	Pop.	±%
1869	11,995	—
1880	12,390	+3.3%
1890	12,527	+1.1%
1900	12,983	+3.6%
1910	13,685	+5.4%

Year	Pop.	±%
1921	12,414	−9.3%
1930	13,479	+8.6%
1950	6,428	−52.3%
1961	6,128	−4.7%
1970	5,820	−5.0%

Year	Pop.	±%
1980	6,204	+6.6%
1991	5,568	−10.3%
2001	5,658	+1.6%
2011	5,404	−4.5%
2021	5,490	+1.6%

Source: Censuses

== Economy ==
The town suffers from its location on the periphery of the Czech Republic. There is persistently high unemployment rate, low supply of services and poor quality of healthcare. Most industrial production has ended and revenues from tourism are insufficient.

== Transport ==
In Rožany is the road border crossing Šluknov-Rožany / Sohland an der Spree to Germany.

Šluknov is located on the railway line Děčín–Rumburk via Germany. The town is served by two train stations: Šluknov and Šluknov zastávka. In the territory of Šluknov is also the train station serving the adjacent village of Valdek.

== Education ==
Šluknov is home to two secondary schools and one of them is focused on forestry. There are three primary schools, including a special school.

== Sights ==
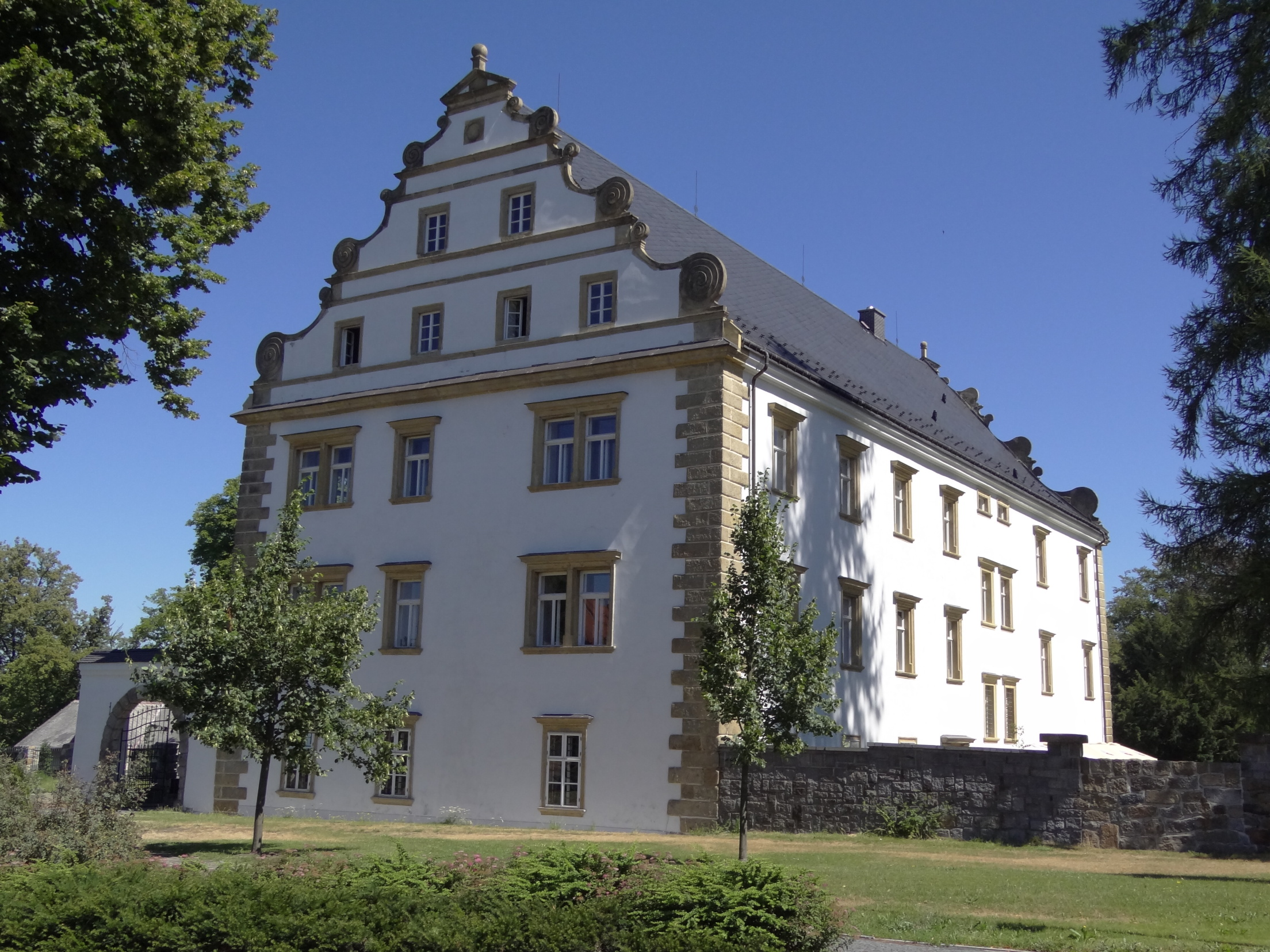
Šluknov Castle

The Šluknov Castle is the main landmark of the town. It was built in the Renaissance style in the 16th century by the Schleinitz family, when it replaced an old fortress from 1487. In the 17th century, Baroque modifications were made. In 1986, Šluknov Castle was burned down. After twenty years of decay, it was repaired. In addition to exhibition and event rooms located in the building, there is a tourist information office. The castle park is often used for public events.

The square Náměstí Míru is the historic centre of the town. Its main landmarks are the Baroque column of the Holy Trinity, built in 1751–1752, and an Empire fountain dating from 1794.

The Church of Saint Wenceslaus is the third church on its place. The previous were burn down by fires in 1634 and 1710 and the current early Baroque church was built in 1711–1722.

The hill Křížový vrch is a valuable complex of sacral buildings, including Stations of the Cross, several chapels and statues. The complex was consecrated in 1756.

== Notable people ==
- Rudolf Kauschka (1883–1960), sportsman and mountaineer
