= Šluknov Hook =

Coordinates: 51°N 14.4°E

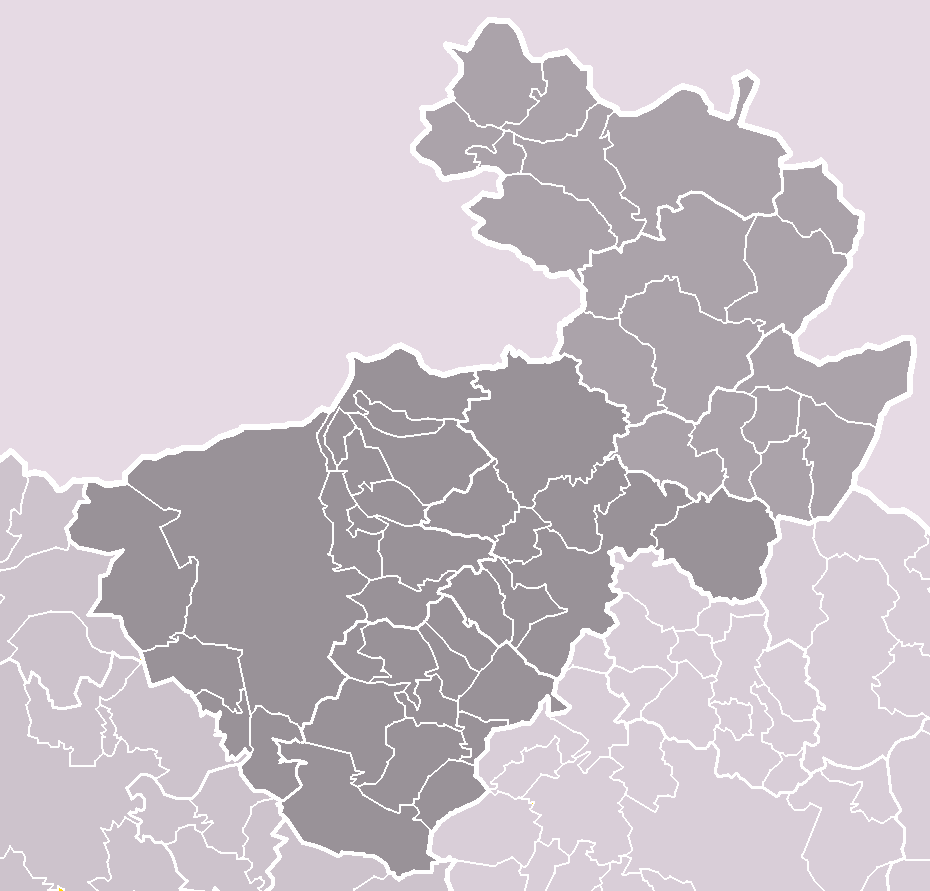
Municipalities in the Šluknov Hook (lighter grey) within the Czech Děčín District

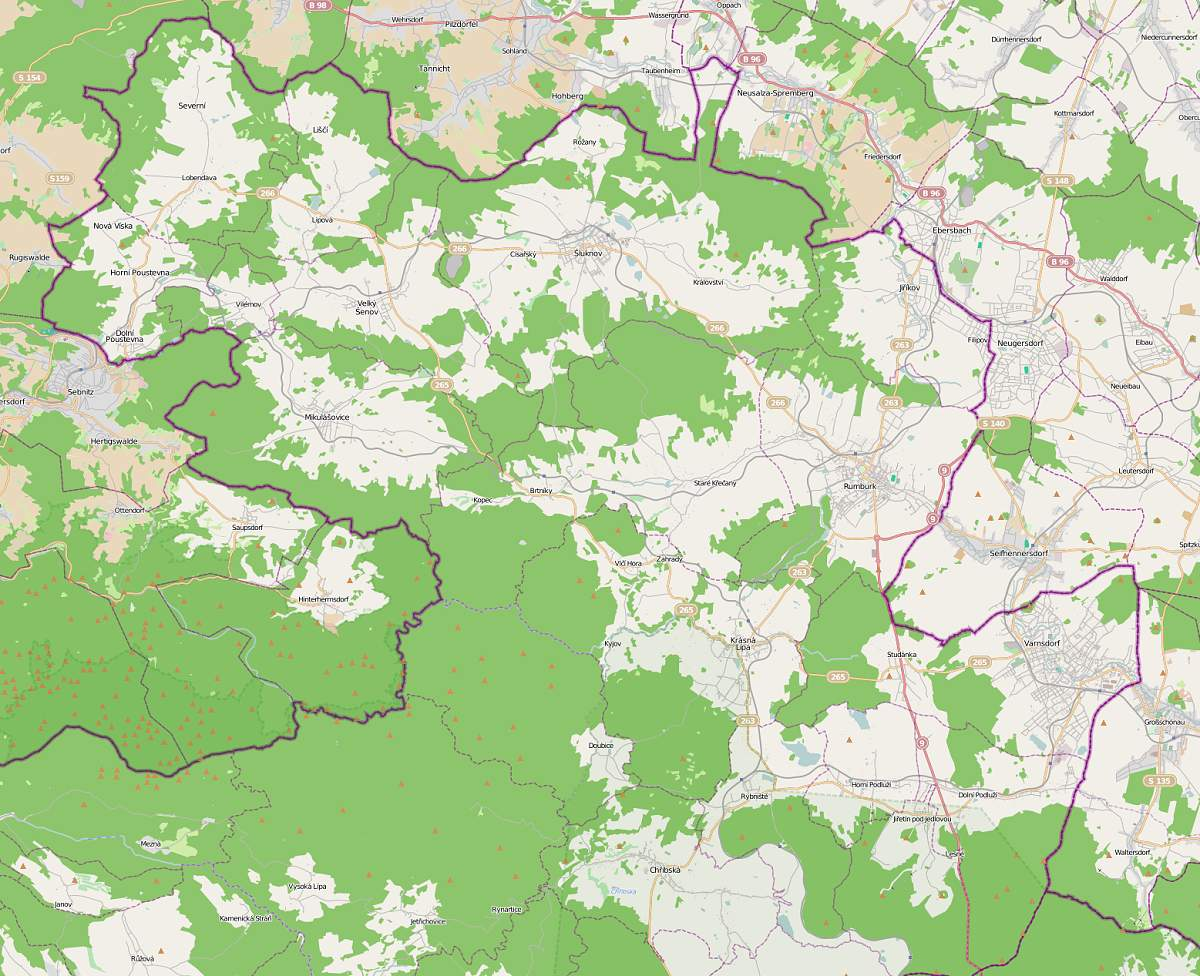
Map of the Šluknov Hook (large green area on the left, divided by state borderline, are the national parks Bohemian Switzerland and Saxon Switzerland)

Šluknov Hook (Czech: Šluknovský výběžek, pronounced [ˈʃluknofskiː ˈviːbjɛʒɛk]; German: Schluckenauer Zipfel or Böhmisches Niederland), Šluknov Spur, or Šluknov Projection is a salient region found in the northern Czech Republic along the border with Germany.

== Geography ==
The area is part of the southern Lusatian Highlands, between the Elbe Sandstone Mountains in the west and the Lusatian Mountains in the east. It is administratively included in the northeastern Děčín District. The largest towns in the region are Varnsdorf, Rumburk, and Šluknov, after which it is named.

== History ==
Šluknov Hook was inhabited by Slavic tribe Milceni since the 6th century. From the 9th century it was part of Duchy of Bohemia. The first German settlers arrived in the area in the 11th century. The territory was owned by the noble Berka of Dubá family, which also owned territories in neighbouring Margravate of Meissen. During the Thirty Years War the local towns were pillaged by Swedish armies.

The Great Depression hit the region from 1929 onwards, employment in the textile industry fell by 40 percent and many factories had to be closed. The unemployment crisis persisted until 1938 due to the orientation towards light industry. Sudeten German Party politician Konrad Henlein benefited from the economic crisis and made several agitation tours of the region. The activities against anti-fascist population began to escalate after the 1935 parliamentary elections, in which Sudeten German Party received majority of votes in German-speaking areas of Czechoslovakia. The first terrorist actions by the armed forces of the Sudeten German Party began to take place. On 12 September 1938, after Hitler's speech at the Nazi Party congress in Nuremberg, in which he publicly declared the right of the Sudeten Germans to self-determination and the will of the Reich to help them resolve this issue. This led to an escalation of tensions throughout the Sudeten German areas, in which the offices of Czechoslovak state, as well as the homes of Czechs, Jews and anti-Nazi Germans, were attacked. In the following hours, the situation escalated even further when Sudeten Germans launched an uprising to create a pretext for a German invasion. The police, gendarmerie and State Defense Guard were urged to restrain from fighting by the Ministry of the Interior. There was a strict ban on the use of firearms, even in the event of a direct armed attack, for fear that response could be used as a casus belli for a German attack against Czechoslovakia. After the Munich Agreement Czechoslovak Army left the region and the German Army arrived. On 6 October 1938 Adolf Hitler briefly visited the area. Most of the Czechs and Jews fled or were expelled from the region. After the outbreak of World War II, most of the factories were converted to war production.

After the WWII ended the German-speaking population was expelled. The region did not reach pre-war population because it could not attract enough new settlers to replace the expelled Germans.

== Tourism ==
The territory has traditionally been marked by Roman Catholicism and its textile industry. It has numerous Baroque churches and corresponding cemeteries, as well as many chapels, cloisters, and places of pilgrimage. Many were built on the mountains of the region, while the great Baroque churches are found in each larger town.

Most medieval castles in the area have been destroyed or have fallen into disrepair. Impressive ruins are found in the old town centre of Šluknov and in nearby Lipová; they are awaiting further reconstruction and restoration. The wooden houses of the region, already restored for the most part, are also popular with tourists. The local infrastructure is well-constructed in order to accommodate tourists.

The region extends into Bohemian Switzerland National Park in the west; the National Park Service is located in Krásná Lípa.
