= Rumburk =

- Town
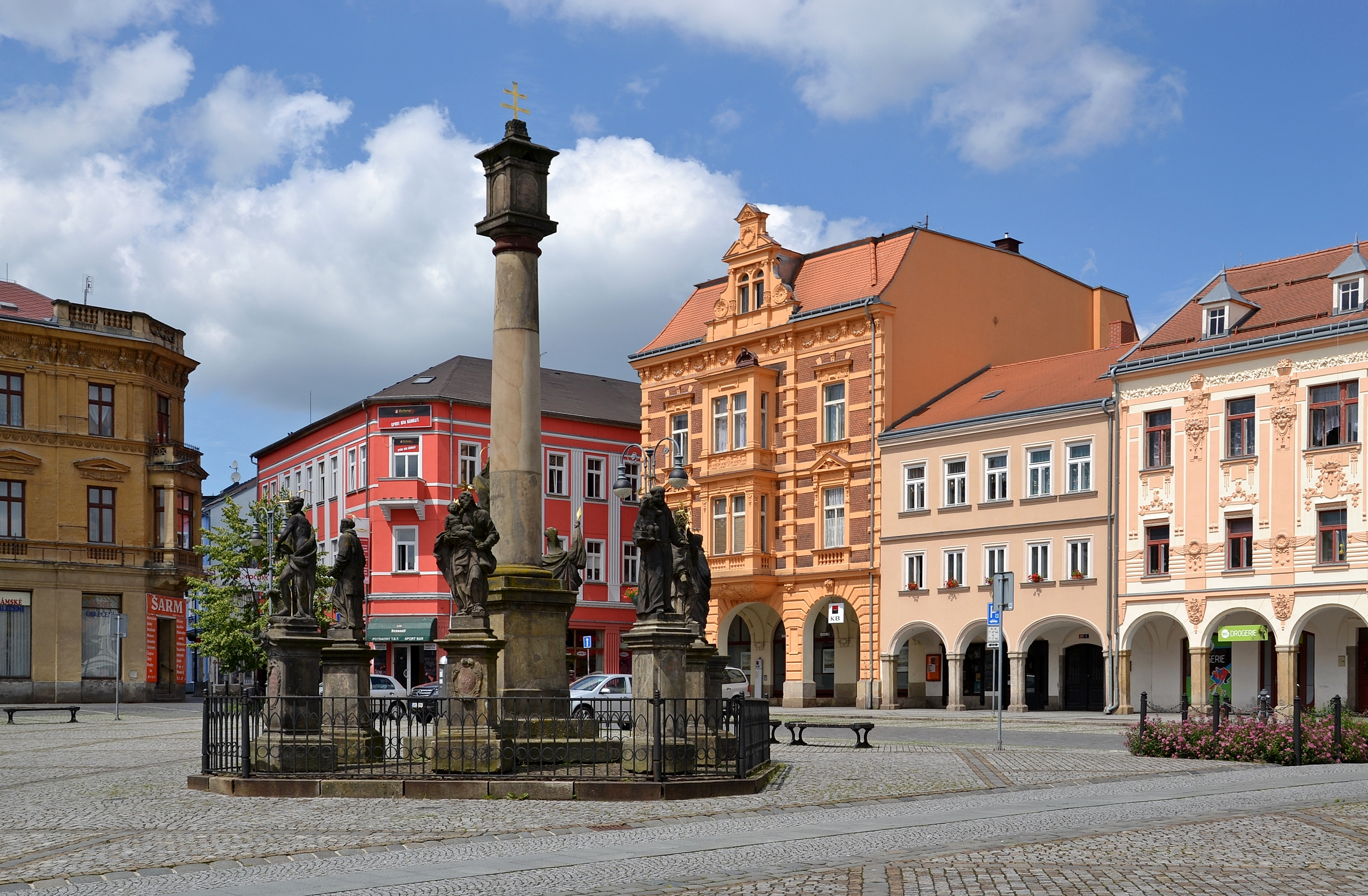
- The square Lužické náměstí

- Flag Coat of arms

- Location in the Czech Republic
- Coordinates: 50°57′6″N 14°33′26″E
- Country: Czech Republic
- Region: Ústí nad Labem
- District: Děčín
- First mentioned: 1298

Government
  - Mayor: Martin Hýbl (ANO)

Area
  - Total: 24.72 km^{2} (9.54 sq mi)
- Elevation: 387 m (1,270 ft)

Population (2026-01-01)
  - Total: 10,780
  - Density: 436.1/km^{2} (1,129/sq mi)
- Time zone: UTC+1 (CET)
  - Summer (DST): UTC+2 (CEST)
- Postal code: 408 01
- Website: www.rumburk.cz

Rumburk (Czech pronunciation: [ˈrumburk]; German: Rumburg) is a town in Děčín District in the Ústí nad Labem Region of the Czech Republic. It has about 11,000 inhabitants. The town is located on the Mandau River in the Lusatian Highlands, on the border with Germany.

The main landmark of Rumburk is the Loreta chapel, a Marian pilgrimage site. A locality in the centre of Rumburk with preserved half-timbered houses is protected as a village monument reservation.

== Administrative division ==
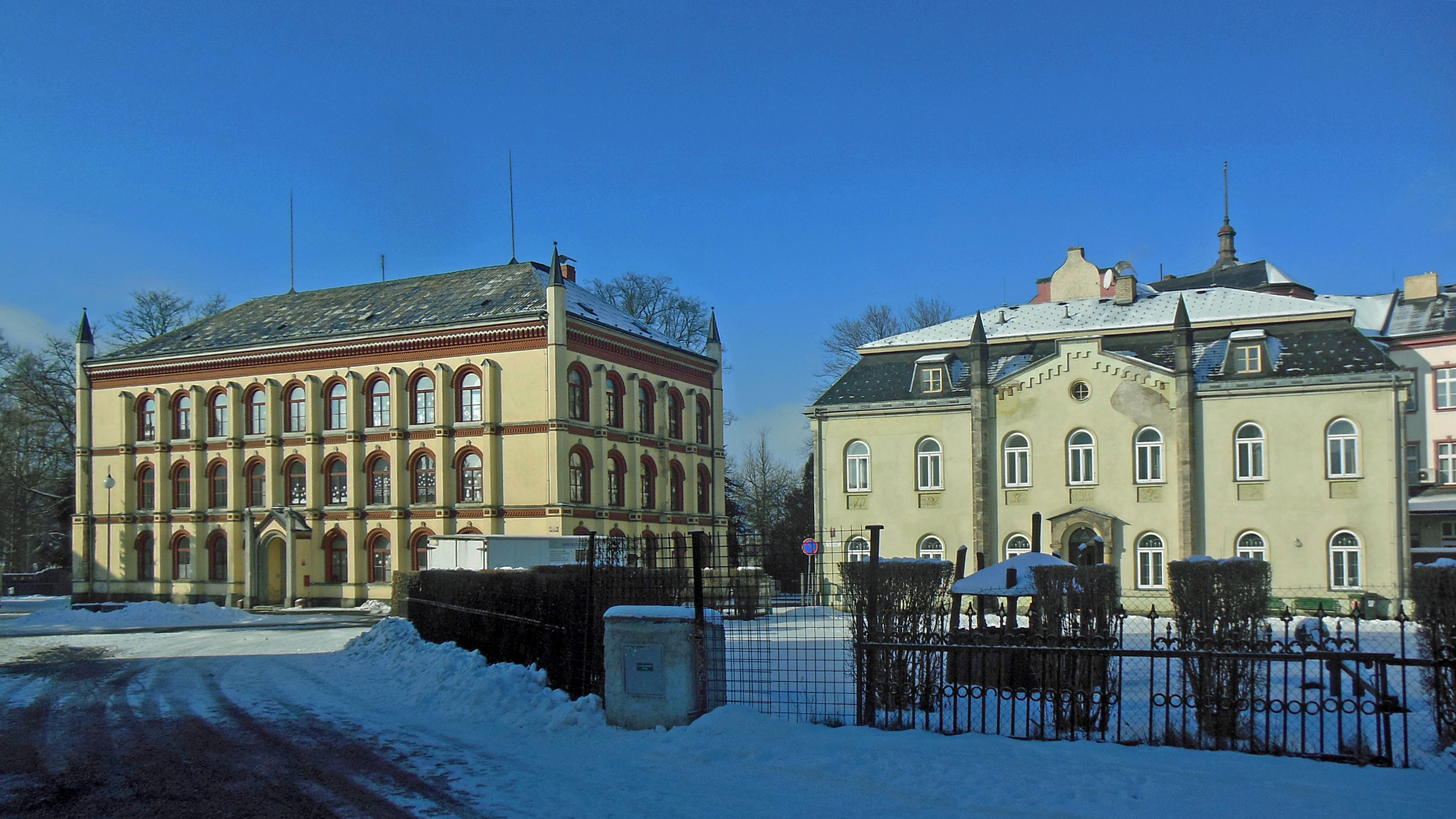
Dobrovského náměstí

Rumburk consists of three municipal parts (in brackets population according to the 2021 census):

- Rumburk 1 (8,224)
- Rumburk 2-Horní Jindřichov (1,185)
- Rumburk 3-Dolní Křečany (972)

== Etymology ==
The initial name of the settlement for Ronenberg. It was derived from the Middle High German words rone ('felled tree') and 'berg' ('mountain', 'hill'). The first part of the name gradually became distorted into its current form Rum- (through Ronen-, Ron- and Rom-). The second part of the name was replaced by the word burg ('castle'), which made more sense to people, and appeared in 1419 for the first time (but -berg appeared until the 16th century).

== Geography ==
Rumburk is located about 30 kilometres (19 mi) northeast of Děčín. It lies in the salient region of Šluknov Hook, on the border with Germany. It is situated in the Lusatian Highlands. The highest point is the hill Dymník at 515 m (1,690 ft) above sea level. The Mandau River (here called Mandava) flows through the town.

== History ==
The first written mention of Rumburk is from 1298. In 1377, it is already referred to as a town. In 1566, a Renaissance castle replaced an old fortress and Rumburk became the centre of the Tolštejn estate.

Between 1713 and 1764, English merchants settled here and foreign capital has contributed to long-term development of the town. In 1869, the railway was built.

Rumburk was the scene of the Rumburk rebellion in May 1918. Until 1918, the town was part of Austria-Hungary, in the district of the same name, one of the 94 Bezirkshauptmannschaften in Bohemia.

During the Paris Peace Conference after World War I, American, British, and Italian diplomats agreed that the Rumburk corner should be given to Germany for economic and ethnographic reasons. Eventually, the Conference followed the Czechs' demand based on alleged indivisibility of Bohemia.

In 1938, Rumburk was occupied by Nazi Germany and administered as part of the Reichsgau Sudetenland. After World War II, the German-speaking population was expelled and replaced by Czech settlers.

== Demographics ==
Historical population

Year	Pop.	±%
1869	13,204	—
1880	14,481	+9.7%
1890	14,602	+0.8%
1900	15,911	+9.0%
1910	16,397	+3.1%

Year	Pop.	±%
1921	14,041	−14.4%
1930	15,738	+12.1%
1950	9,300	−40.9%
1961	9,459	+1.7%
1970	9,095	−3.8%

Year	Pop.	±%
1980	10,255	+12.8%
1991	10,789	+5.2%
2001	11,024	+2.2%
2011	10,770	−2.3%
2021	10,381	−3.6%

Source: Censuses

== Economy ==
Following a number of years of depression after the fall of communism, the region is now poised to become an industrial centre again. The largest employer with headquarters in Rumburk is Benteler Automotive Rumburk, a manufacturer of automotive parts with more than 500 employees.

== Transport ==
Rumburk has a road border crossing with the German town of Seifhennersdorf.

The town is the starting point of the regional railway line to Kolín and of two local lines to Děčín (one via Česká Kamenice and one via Sebnitz).

== Sights ==
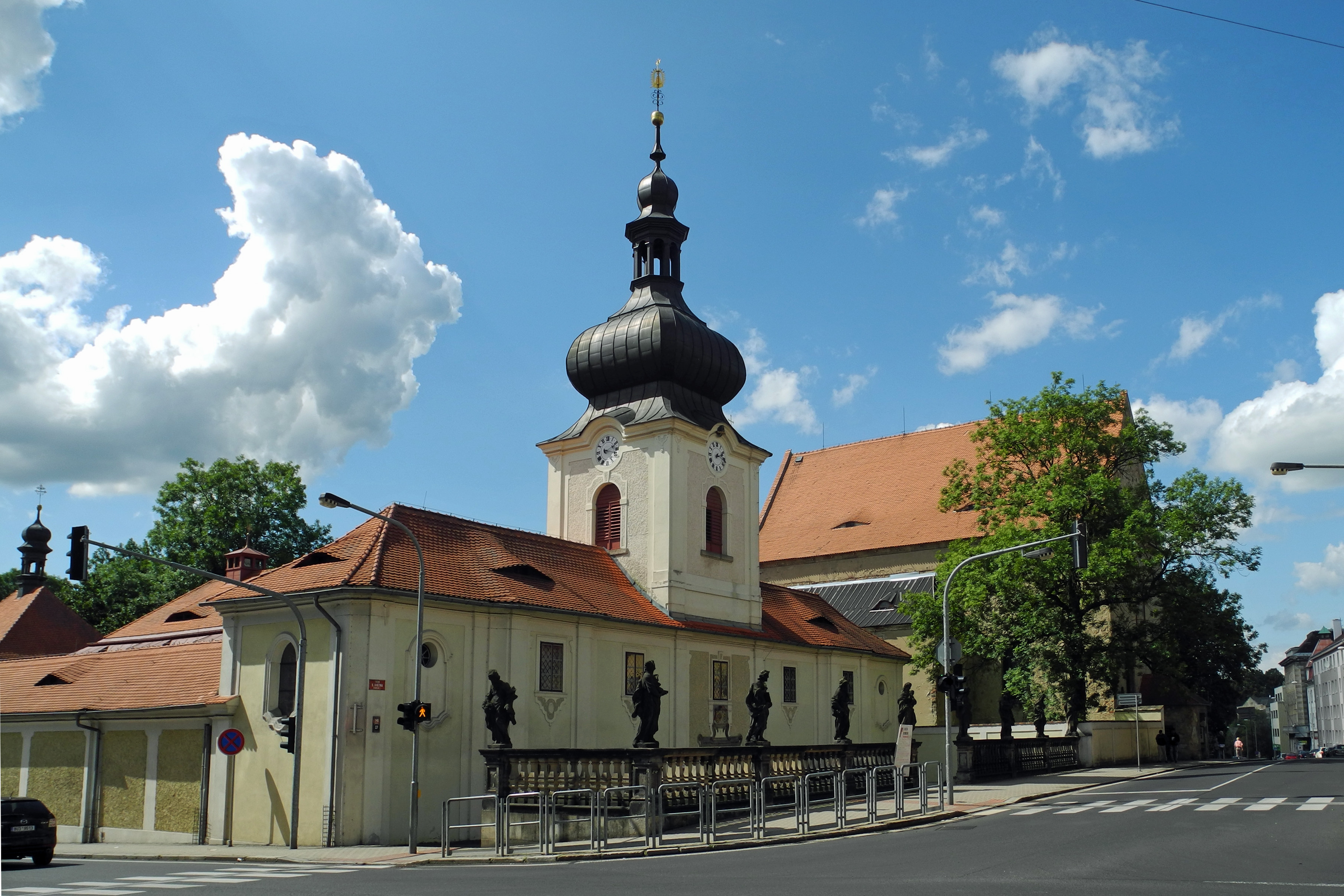
Loreta chapel

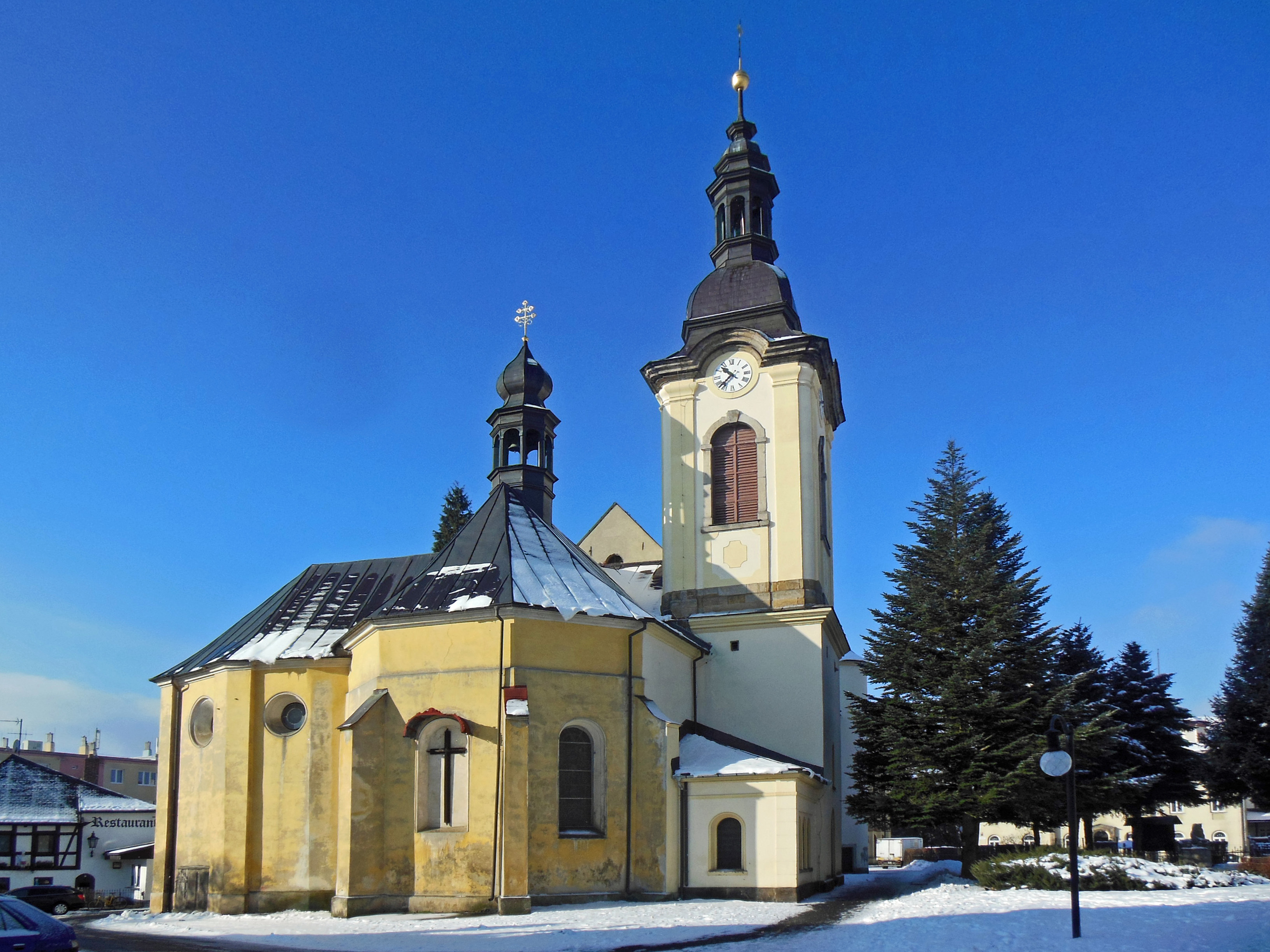
Church of Saint Bartholomew

Rumburk has historical centre with many valuable houses. In the town there are also important monuments of folk architecture – half-timbered houses. The area with eighteen half-timbered houses is protected as a village monument reservation.

The main landmark of Rumburk is the Loreta chapel. It was built in the Baroque style by plans of Johann Lukas von Hildebrandt in 1704–1707. It is surrounded by a cloister with a rich ceiling painting from the life of the Virgin Mary, four chapels and a restored Chapel of the Holy Steps (built in 1768–1770). Loreta in Rumburk is an important Marian pilgrimage site for the region.

The former Capuchin monastery and its Church of Saint Lawrence were built in 1683–1685. The monastery was abolished in 1950. The valuable building now serves as a library. The church still serves cultural and religious purposes.

The original wooden Church of Saint Bartholomew was built in the late 12th or early 13th century. The oldest written mention dates from 1352. The building was severely damaged by fires in 1515, 1624 and 1744. Its current appearance is a result of the reconstruction in 1755.

== Notable people ==
- Johann Nepomuk Fischer (1777–1847), Austrian ophthalmologist
- Josef Emanuel Fischer von Röslerstamm (1787–1866), Austrian entomologist
- Franz Xaver Chwatal (1808–1879), pianist, composer and music teacher
- Viktor Tietz (1859–1937), German chess player
- Rudolf Pitschak (1902–1988), Czech-German chess master
- Helmut Baierl (1926–2005), German playwright
- Jaroslav Falta (1951–2022), motocross racer
