= Jaroslava Fabiánová =

Czech serial killer

- Born: 1965 (age 60–61); Děčín, Czechoslovakia
- Other name: "The Czech Aileen Wuornos"
- Conviction: Murder
- Penalty: Life imprisonment

Details
- Victims: 4
- Span of crimes: 1981–2003
- Country: Czech Republic
- States: Ústí nad Labem Region, Prague
- Date apprehended: 22 August 2003

Jaroslava Fabiánová (born 1965) is a Czech serial killer who committed a total of four financially motivated murders between 1981 and 2003. She is currently serving a life imprisonment sentence for four murders and other crimes. Their similar backgrounds, psychopathology and modus operandi led the media to refer to Fabiánová as "the Czech Aileen Wuornos."

== Adolescence and first crimes ==
Jaroslava Fabiánová was born in 1965 and was allegedly raped as a child. Her parents divorced when she was 13 years old, and since neither parent showed interest in their children, she was abandoned. In 1981, in Děčín, she joined a group of her Roma peers who engaged in petty theft and occasional prostitution. Later that year, Fabiánová took part in several burglaries. In October, she killed 78-year-old Vladimir Z. using a masonry hammer and a kitchen knife when he refused to pay her for sexual services. She stabbed him in the face with a stitching awl. She was apprehended one day after the murder and charged with murder and her earlier burglaries. As a minor, she was sentenced to 7 years imprisonment, but served only 4 years and 9 months. After serving her sentence, she became a switchman at České dráhy, but continued engaging in prostitution, later drugging and robbing her clients. In 1996, she was arrested for the death of a Hungarian tourist, who died of an overdose as a result of her drugging his beer with a hypnotic to rob him. Fabiánová was sentenced to 10 years in prison, followed up with a 5-year ban on visiting Prague, serving her sentence in the Pardubice women's penitentiary. She was released on parole in 2001. Despite her legal banishment from Prague, she stole a cell phone there on 23 February and sold it to a pawnbroker. However, she sold it using her own ID, and was arrested and sentenced to one year in jail with 3 years probation.

== Apprehension and conviction ==
On 5 June 2003, Augustin K. was found in Prague's Poříčí district. He had been murdered in the kitchen with a cleaver, with the corpse then pulled out of the living room, sat in a chair and covered with a blanket. The apartment was then robbed of three paintings and electric tools worth 50,000 crowns. DNA traces found at the scene matched Jaroslava Fabiánová. A woman present in the building on the day of the murder recognized Fabiánová. Another witness said that she helped her by selling one of the stolen paintings to a gallery for 10,000 crowns. Originally, Fabiánová had offered all three paintings, but she sold one later herself for 2,000 crowns and she later disposed of the last one because it was damaged. After this, a warrant for her arrest was issued. At the beginning of August, she was hospitalized in Prague, and after release, she decided to stay in the city. On 8 August, she met 31-year-old Richard S. on a tram, who invited her to a disco and then to his home. There, Fabiánová stabbed him 38 times in the bathroom with a knife. Her DNA was found on the victim's fingernails. On 22 August, she was arrested and charged with both murders. During the investigation, she claimed that Augustin K. gave her the paintings, and because he did not feel well, she left the apartment. In the case of Richard S., she admitted that she had robbed the man, but denied having hurt him. In 2005, she was found guilty and became the third woman in the history of the Czech Republic to be sentenced to life.

== Media ==
Jaroslava Fabiánová (renamed "Ms. Fialová") was portrayed by Anna Polívková in the Případy 1. oddělení episode "Nenávist" ("Hatred").

== See also ==
- Aileen Wuornos
- List of serial killers by country
