= Děčín Zoo =

Zoo in Děčín, Czech Republic

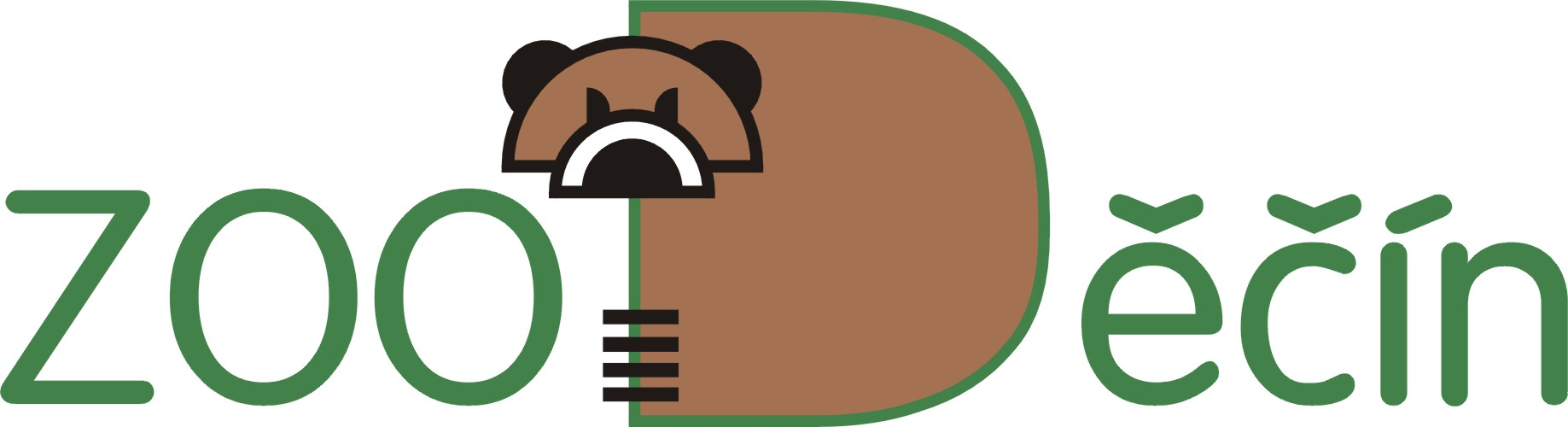

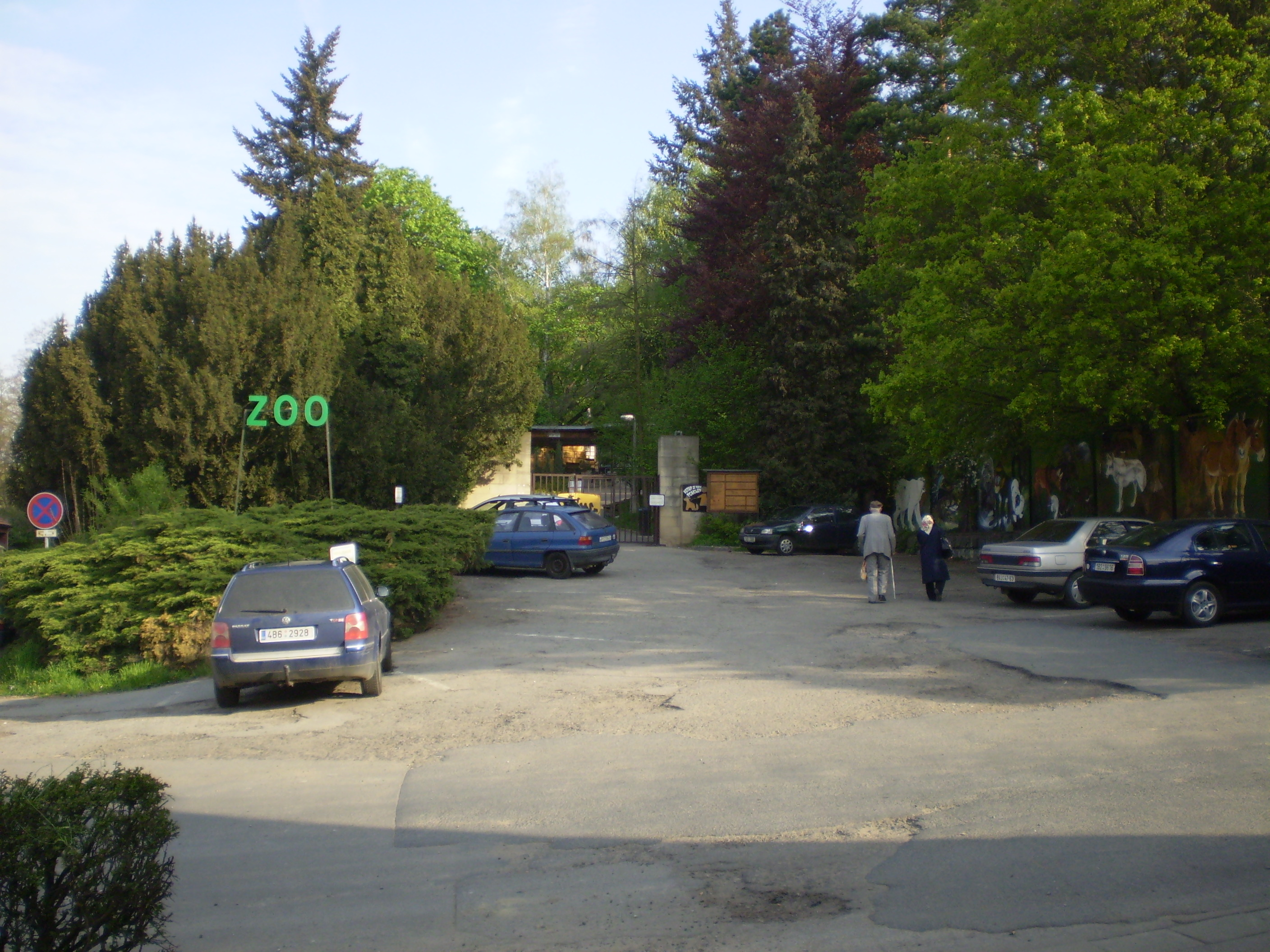
- Interactive map of Děčín Zoo
- 50°46′46″N 14°11′50″E
- Date opened: 1949
- Location: Žižkova 1286/15, 405 02 Děčín
- Land area: 6 hectares
- No. of animals: 400
- No. of species: 150
- Memberships: EEP, UCSZOO, IZE, WAZA, EAZA, ISIS, FFI
- Website: www.zoodecin.cz

Děčín Zoo, is a Czech zoo, located in Děčín in Czech Republic.

Děčín Zoo was founded in 1948, when only four zoological parks existed in Czechoslovakia.

The zoo in opened its gates in 1949, through Ludvík Grác, a local Podmokly businessperson and zoological specialist and a group of animal enthusiasts. Ludvík Grác became the first director, a title he kept until 1966. The present director is Kateřina Majerová.

In 2014 the zoo kept some 400 animals of over 150 species, among them rare species not encountered elsewhere in Czech Republic.
