= Děčín =

- Statutory city
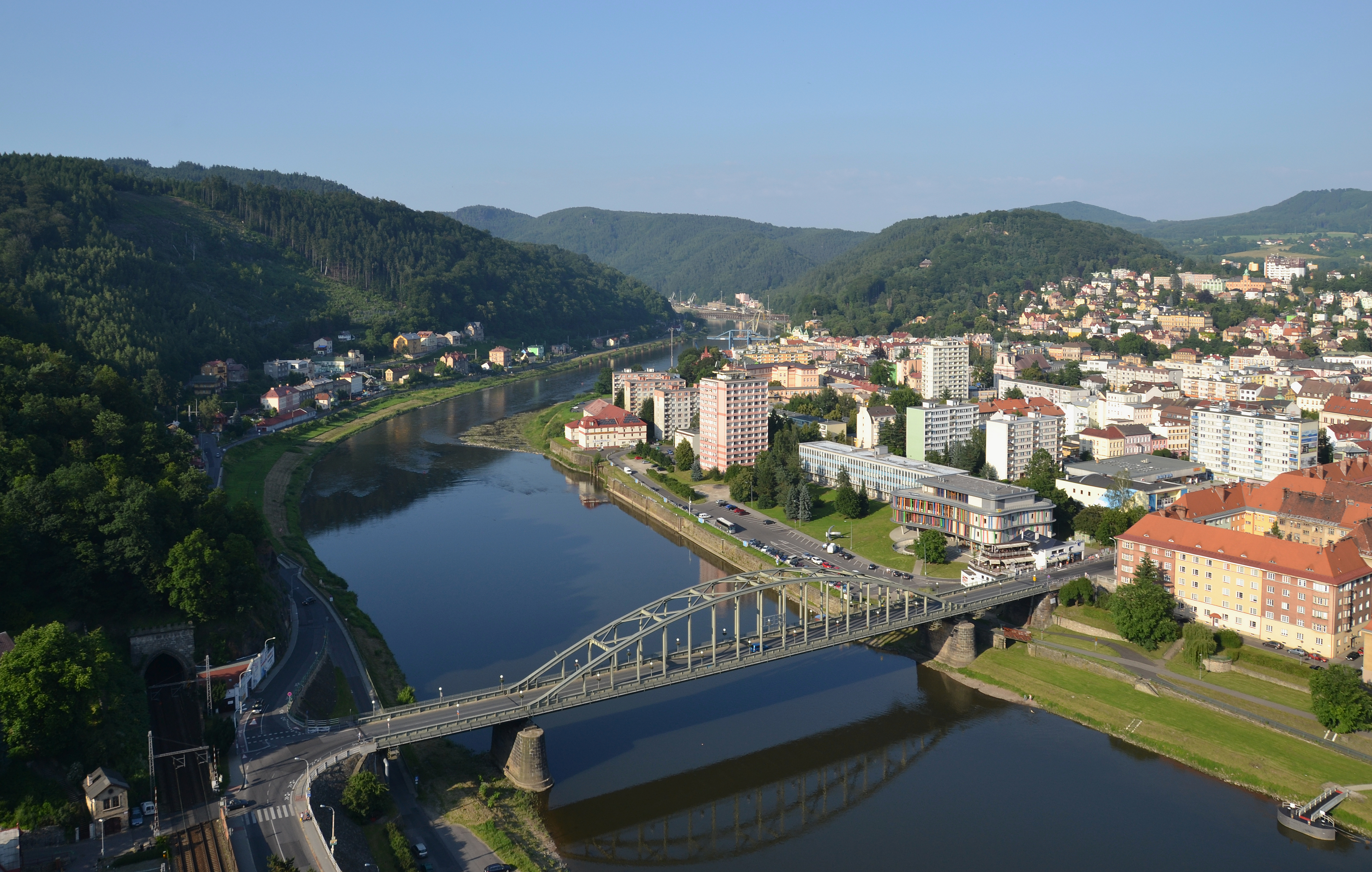
- View over the Elbe Valley

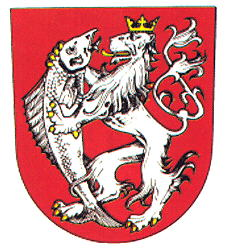
- Flag Coat of arms

- Location in the Czech Republic
- Coordinates: 50°46′25″N 14°11′46″E
- Country: Czech Republic
- Region: Ústí nad Labem
- District: Děčín
- First mentioned: 993

Government
  - Mayor: Martin Pošta (Volba pro Děčín)

Area
  - Total: 117.70 km^{2} (45.44 sq mi)
- Elevation: 135 m (443 ft)

Population (2026-01-01)
  - Total: 46,003
  - Density: 390.85/km^{2} (1,012.3/sq mi)
- Time zone: UTC+1 (CET)
  - Summer (DST): UTC+2 (CEST)
- Postal code: 405 02
- Website: www.mmdecin.cz

Děčín (Czech pronunciation: [ˈɟɛtʃiːn]; German: Tetschen) is a city in the Ústí nad Labem Region of the Czech Republic. It has about 46,000 inhabitants. It is the seventh largest municipality in the country by area. It is located near the border with Germany, at the confluence of the Elbe and Ploučnice rivers, on the border of two protected landscape areas.

Děčín is an important traffic junction of land, rail and water transport. The city first developed due to the importance of the Elbe River as a transport route and, from the mid-19th century, due to the important railway connection between Prague and Germany. Secondary and higher education in the city is focused on transport. Tourism is also important for Děčín's economy. The main tourist destinations in Děčín include Děčín Castle and Děčín Zoo.

== Administrative division ==
Děčín consists of 35 municipal parts (in brackets population according to the 2021 census):

- Děčín I-Děčín (4,723)
- Děčín II-Nové Město (5,948)
- Děčín III-Staré Město (3,687)
- Děčín IV-Podmokly (5,376)
- Děčín V-Rozbělesy (342)
- Děčín VI-Letná (7,502)
- Děčín VII-Chrochvice (1,252)
- Děčín VIII-Dolní Oldřichov (704)
- Děčín IX-Bynov (3,670)
- Děčín X-Bělá (907)
- Děčín XI-Horní Žleb (292)
- Děčín XII-Vilsnice (277)
- Děčín XIII-Loubí (185)
- Děčín XIV-Dolní Žleb (141)
- Děčín XV-Prostřední Žleb (232)
- Děčín XVI-Přípeř (97)
- Děčín XVII-Jalůvčí (559)
- Děčín XVIII-Maxičky (100)
- Děčín XIX-Čechy (195)
- Děčín XX-Nová Ves (218)
- Děčín XXI-Horní Oldřichov (445)
- Děčín XXII-Václavov (306)
- Děčín XXIII-Popovice (175)
- Děčín XXIV-Krásný Studenec (594)
- Děčín XXV-Chmelnice (297)
- Děčín XXVI-Bechlejovice (166)
- Děčín XXVII-Březiny (1,757)
- Děčín XXVIII-Folknáře (333)
- Děčín XXIX-Hoštice nad Labem (45)
- Děčín XXX-Velká Veleň (93)
- Děčín XXXI-Křešice (728)
- Děčín XXXII-Boletice nad Labem (4,437)
- Děčín XXXIII-Nebočady (312)
- Děčín XXXIV-Chlum (90)
- Děčín XXXV-Lesná (152)

== Etymology ==
The name is derived from the personal Slavic name Děk.

== Geography ==
Děčín is located about 18 kilometres (11 mi) northeast of Ústí nad Labem and 40 km (25 mi) southeast of Dresden. The municipal territory borders Germany in the north. With an area of 117.70 km^{2} (45.44 sq mi), Děčín is the 7th largest municipality in the country by area. It lies in the transition zone between the Elbe Sandstone Mountains in the north and the Central Bohemian Uplands in the south. The highest point is a contour line on the slopes of Děčínský Sněžník at 702 m (2,303 ft) above sea level.

The city proper lies at the confluence of the Elbe and Ploučnice rivers. Most of the built-up area is situated in the river valley with an elevation of 135 m (443 ft), which makes it the lowest city in the country. The entire area of the city falls into the protected landscape areas České středohoří and Labské pískovce.

=== Climate ===
Děčín's climate is classified as humid continental climate (Köppen: Cfb; Trewartha: Dobk). Among them, the annual average temperature is 9.7 °C (49.5 °F), the hottest month in July is 19.3 °C (66.7 °F), and the coldest month is 0.3 °C (32.5 °F) in January. The annual precipitation is 600.5 millimetres (23.64 in), of which July is the wettest with 82.1 millimetres (3.23 in), while April is the driest with only 28.7 millimetres (1.13 in). The extreme temperature throughout the year ranged from −26.6 °C (−15.9 °F) on 9 February 1956 to 38.6 °C (101.5 °F) on 28 July 2013.

Climate data for Děčín, 1991–2020 normals, extremes 1861–present
Month	Jan	Feb	Mar	Apr	May	Jun	Jul	Aug	Sep	Oct	Nov	Dec	Year
Record high °C (°F)	17.5 (63.5)	19.2 (66.6)	25.3 (77.5)	31.7 (89.1)	33.8 (92.8)	37.0 (98.6)	38.6 (101.5)	38.5 (101.3)	33.0 (91.4)	27.2 (81.0)	20.3 (68.5)	16.8 (62.2)	38.6 (101.5)
Mean daily maximum °C (°F)	3.1 (37.6)	5.5 (41.9)	10.0 (50.0)	16.4 (61.5)	21.1 (70.0)	24.4 (75.9)	26.2 (79.2)	25.9 (78.6)	20.4 (68.7)	14.2 (57.6)	8.2 (46.8)	4.0 (39.2)	14.9 (58.8)
Daily mean °C (°F)	0.3 (32.5)	1.5 (34.7)	4.8 (40.6)	9.7 (49.5)	14.4 (57.9)	17.7 (63.9)	19.3 (66.7)	18.5 (65.3)	13.9 (57.0)	9.3 (48.7)	5.1 (41.2)	1.6 (34.9)	9.7 (49.5)
Mean daily minimum °C (°F)	−2.4 (27.7)	−1.9 (28.6)	0.6 (33.1)	3.9 (39.0)	8.5 (47.3)	11.8 (53.2)	13.7 (56.7)	13.0 (55.4)	9.5 (49.1)	5.7 (42.3)	2.4 (36.3)	−0.9 (30.4)	5.3 (41.5)
Record low °C (°F)	−24.5 (−12.1)	−26.6 (−15.9)	−18.5 (−1.3)	−8.7 (16.3)	−3.0 (26.6)	−1.6 (29.1)	3.6 (38.5)	1.2 (34.2)	−2.4 (27.7)	−8.0 (17.6)	−13.4 (7.9)	−22.5 (−8.5)	−26.6 (−15.9)
Average precipitation mm (inches)	44.9 (1.77)	32.6 (1.28)	39.3 (1.55)	28.7 (1.13)	56.3 (2.22)	61.3 (2.41)	82.1 (3.23)	76.8 (3.02)	48.3 (1.90)	47.6 (1.87)	40.9 (1.61)	41.7 (1.64)	600.5 (23.64)
Average snowfall cm (inches)	15.1 (5.9)	11.8 (4.6)	4.8 (1.9)	0.8 (0.3)	0.0 (0.0)	0.0 (0.0)	0.0 (0.0)	0.0 (0.0)	0.0 (0.0)	0.0 (0.0)	2.1 (0.8)	13.5 (5.3)	48.1 (18.9)
Average relative humidity (%)	82.1	78.6	74.3	69.6	70.3	69.9	71.7	74.7	80.2	82.6	84.1	83.9	76.8
Mean monthly sunshine hours	15.2	34.9	76.4	120.7	136.8	170.5	160.3	142.9	119.5	69.6	20.4	11.6	1,078.6
Source: Czech Hydrometeorological Institute

== History ==
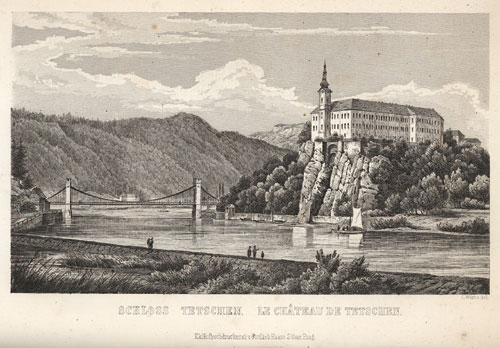
Děčín Castle, 1855

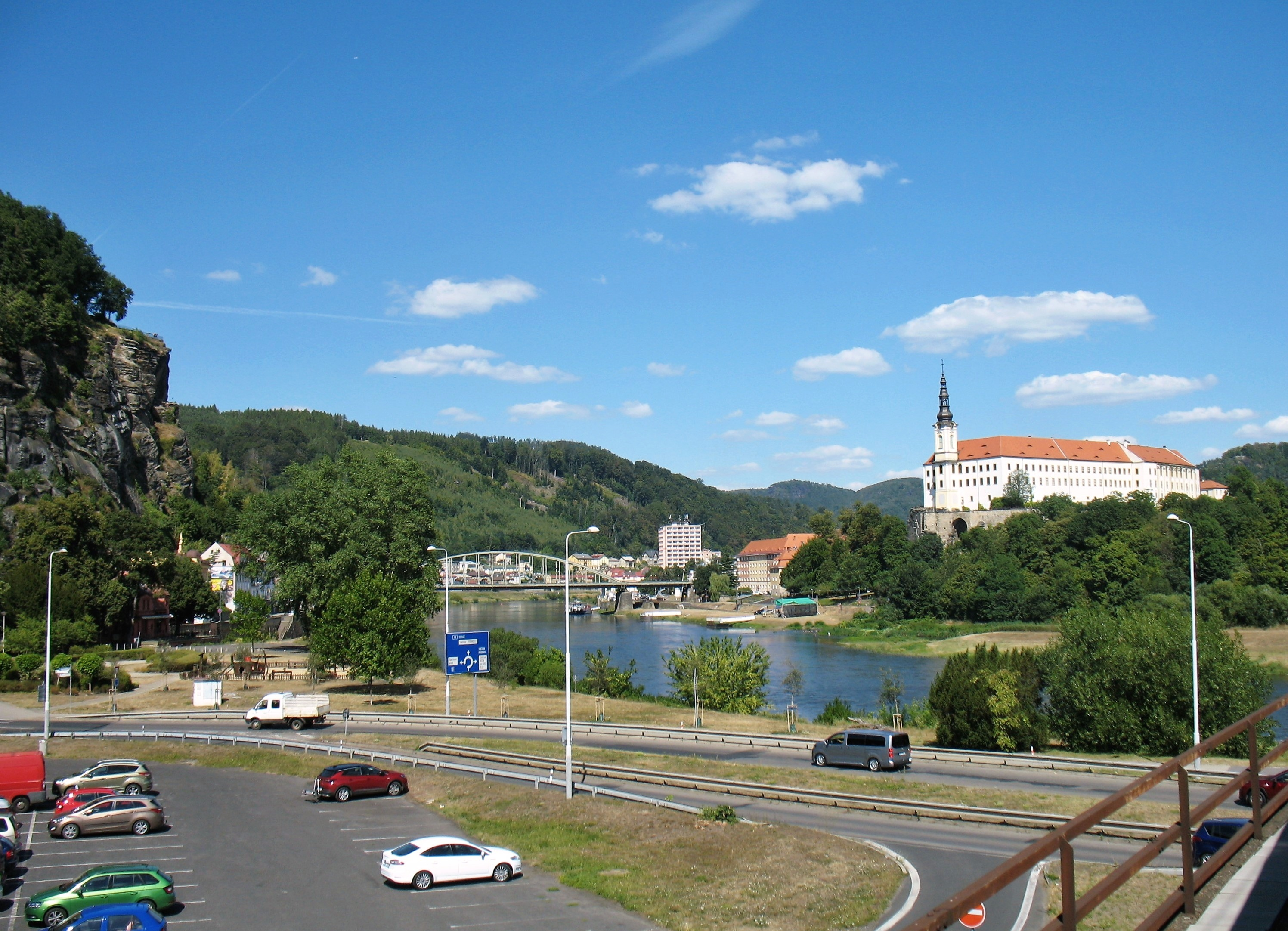
Děčín Castle above the Elbe River

According to archaeological discoveries, the settlement of the area began at the La Tène times. Slavic settlement can be documented since the 7th century. The first written mention of Děčín is from 993, when the Děčín province existed and it is assumed that Děčín was its administrative centre. Děčín was founded at the ford over the Elbe in the places where the trade route led. The Přemyslid dukes of Bohemia had a gord built for the protection of the waterway. The gord was replaced by a stone castle in the first half of the 13th century. In the second half of the 13th century, King Ottokar II founded a new royal city under the castle.

The Lords of Wartenberg acquired Děčín in 1305. They made the city their family seat, but had to sell it due to debts. From 1511 to 1515, the estate was owned by Mikuláš Trčka of Lípa, who then sold it to the Salhausen family. In 1534, Knights of Bünau purchased the estate. They had rebuilt a part of the castle into a comfortable Renaissance residence. During their rule, the city experienced rapid development. Trade, transport on the Elbe and handicrafts flourished. Stone quarries, a lime factory and a brickyard were established.

The Knights of Bünau introduced Protestantism to the region, however the Protestant belief was suppressed by the Habsburg kings in the course of the Counter-Reformation, and the Bünaus were driven out upon the 1620 Battle of White Mountain. In 1628, they sold the estate to the Thun und Hohenstein family. This family owned Děčín until 1918. The city suffered during the Thirty Years' War. In 1631 it was occupied by the Saxons and in 1639 and 1648 it was conquered by the Swedish army. As a result of the war, Děčín turned into a small insignificant town.

In the 1768, a spring of mineral water was discovered in the nearby village of Horní Žleb (today part of Děčín). Count Johann Joseph Thun founded here a small spa in 1777. The spa prospered and the Thun family built additional infrastructure. Due to the development of industry and traffic, which brought noise to the area, the spa began to decline, and in 1906 the Thuns sold it. In 1922, the spa was finally closed.

A new development of Děčín took place in the 18th century. The biggest impetus to the development of industry was the construction of a railway from Prague to Dresden in 1851. Děčín on the right bank of the Elbe and the village of Podmokly (German: Bodenbach) on the left bank became an important transport hubs. The growth of industry triggered the construction of apartments and an influx of residents. Between 1890 and 1914, population of Podmokly raised to 20,000 inhabitants. Podmokly was promoted to a town in 1901.

Following World War I, since 1918, the area was part of Czechoslovakia. Upon the 1938 Munich Agreement, both towns were annexed by Nazi Germany and incorporated into the Reichsgau Sudetenland. Under German occupation, a Gestapo prison and a forced labour camp were located in the city. After the war, the ethnic German population was expelled under terms of the 1945 Potsdam Agreement and the Beneš decrees. Both towns were merged in 1942. After 1945, the neighbouring municipalities gradually also merged with Děčín.

Děčín was badly hit by the 2002 European flood.

== Demographics ==
Historical population

Year	Pop.	±%
1869	17,492	—
1880	22,846	+30.6%
1890	28,298	+23.9%
1900	37,617	+32.9%
1910	48,148	+28.0%

Year	Pop.	±%
1921	50,010	+3.9%
1930	55,925	+11.8%
1950	42,563	−23.9%
1961	46,339	+8.9%
1970	50,301	+8.6%

Year	Pop.	±%
1980	53,207	+5.8%
1991	53,899	+1.3%
2001	52,506	−2.6%
2011	49,106	−6.5%
2021	46,337	−5.6%

Source: Censuses

== Economy ==
The largest employer based in Děčín is ČEZ Distribuce, a part of ČEZ Group engaged in the distribution of electricity. The largest industrial companies are Constellium Extrusions Děčín, a manufacturer of aluminium products, and Chart Ferox, a manufacturer of gas storage systems.

Tourism is a significant part of the city's economy. The city benefits from its location in protected landscape areas and the proximity of the Bohemian Switzerland National Park.

== Transport ==
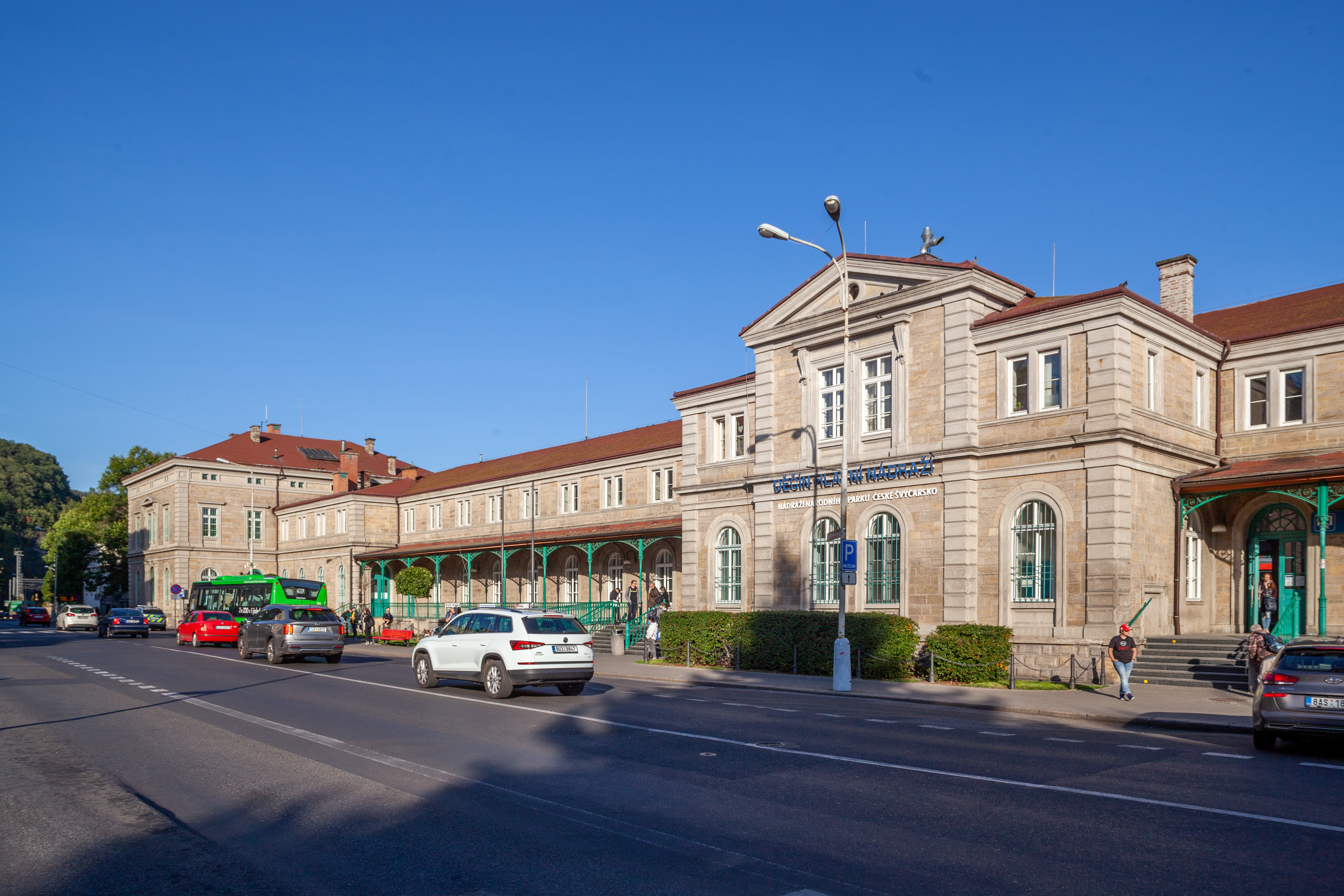
Děčín hlavní nádraží railway station

Děčín is a significant junction of land, rail and water transport, situated near an important Czech–German border crossing. The city is located at the intersection of roads I/13 (from Teplice to Liberec) and I/62 (from Ústí nad Labem to the Czech–German border), which are parts of the European route E442).

The railway station Děčín hlavní nádraží is located on one of the most important Czech railway lines, which leads from Prague to Děčín via Ústí nad Labem, and continues to Dresden, Berlin, Hamburg and Kiel. Other lines that lead from or through the city are Ústí nad Labem–Liberec, Děčín–Kadaň, and Děčín–Rumburk. In addition to the main railway station, the large territory of Děčín is served by eleven other train stations: Děčín-Staré Město, Děčín východ, Děčín-Přípeř, Děčín-Prostřední Žleb, Děčín-Čertova Voda, Boletice nad Labem, Březiny u Děčína, Dolní Žleb, Dolní Žleb zastávka, Křešice u Děčína and Vilsnice.

Other three train stops, Děčín zastávka, Děčín-Oldřichov and Děčín-Bynov, are located on the Děčín hlavní nádraží–Telnice line, which operates only during the tourist season on weekends and holidays. The ČSD Class M 152.0 retro train drives there.

There are two public river ports.

== Education and science ==
The Czech Technical University in Prague has a detached workplace in Děčín, specifically for its faculties of Nuclear Sciences and Physical Engineering and Transportation. The faculties are preparing to establish a scientific centre for research of Application of AI, Development of biomaterial and HPC computing in Děčín.

Děčín is known for the Secondary School of Shipping and Technical Crafts. The school owns the largest school workshop ship in the Czech Republic.

== Sport ==
Děčín is home to BK Děčín, a professional basketball team that plays its home games in the ARMEX Sportcentrum.

== Sights ==
=== Děčín Castle ===
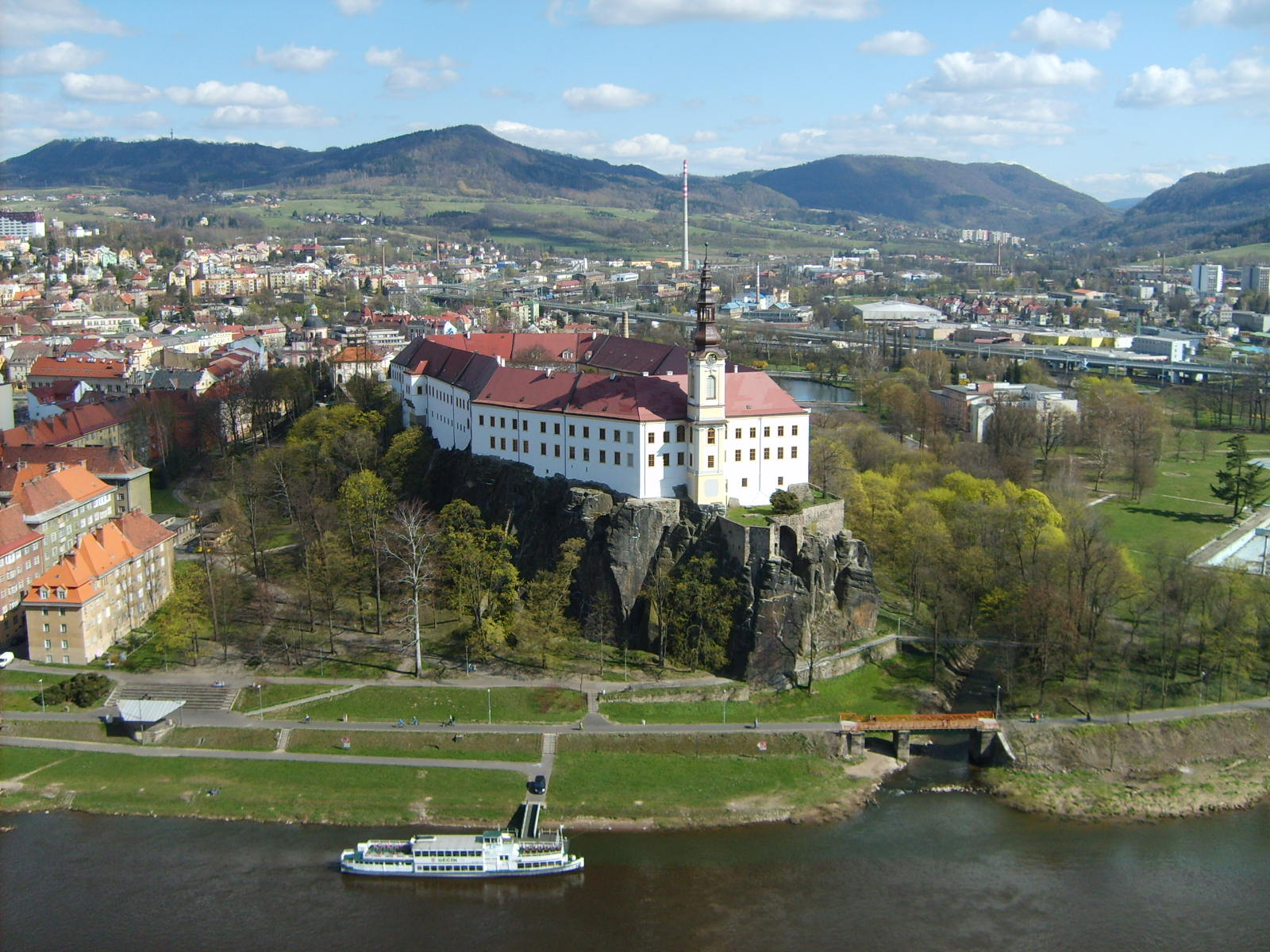
Děčín Castle

Děčín Castle is one of the most popular sights in the region. It is located on a hill near the city centre and overlooks the Elbe. Not later than in 1128, it was constructed as a wooden fortress, and replaced by a royal stone castle in the 13th century. In the 16th century, a grand Renaissance palace was constructed on the site, to be renovated in the Baroque style from the 17th century onward.

From 1628, the castle served as the administrative centre of the Thun und Hohenstein family. They built an unusual feature of the castle – the long, straight-walled road leading up to it, known as the "Long Ride" (Dlouhá jízda). The last major renovation was completed in 1803. In 1835, Frédéric Chopin wrote his Waltz in A-flat major, Op. 34 No. 1 here.

In 1932, financial problems forced the Thun und Hohenstein family to sell the castle to the Czechoslovak state. It served as army barracks, then it was appropriated by occupying Germans as a military garrison during World War II. Lastly, it was occupied by Soviet troops, who invaded from the east and rousted the Germans.

The Soviet Army departed in 1991, leaving the castle in a state of disrepair. In 2005, the government completed a restoration of a large part of the castle and opened it as a museum and venue for private gatherings and public events.

=== Sacral monuments ===
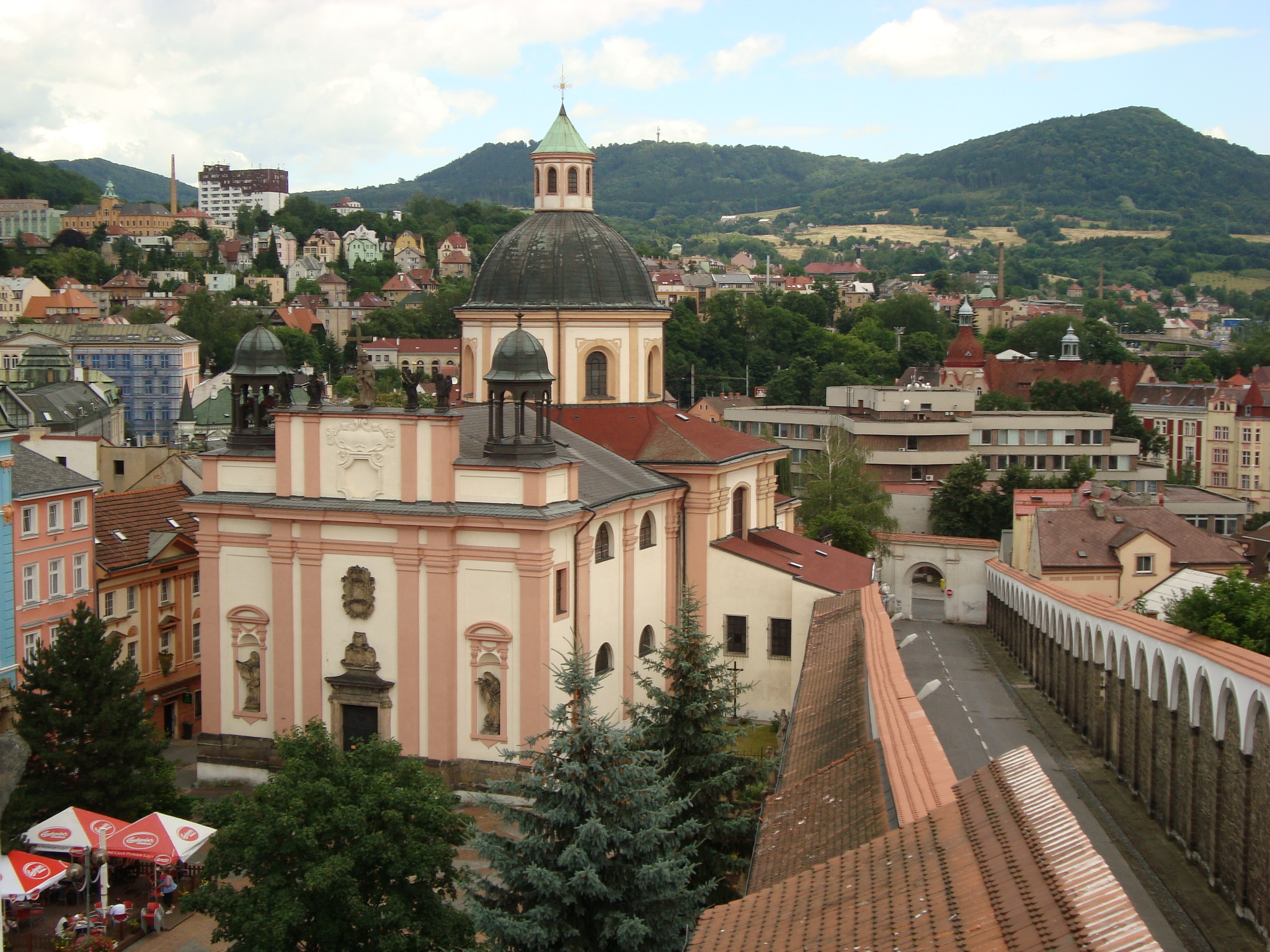
Church of the Exaltation of the Holy Cross and the Long Ride

The Church of the Exaltation of the Holy Cross is one of the most important monuments of the city. It was built in the early Baroque style in 1687–1691 by the Thun und Hohenstein family as a castle church. A covered corridor on pillared arcades connects the church with the castle. The Chapel of Our Lady of the Snows adjoins the church from the south side.

The Church of Saints Wenceslaus and Blaise was built in the Baroque style in 1754–1778. It replaced a church destroyed by a fire in 1749.

The Church of Saint Francis of Assisi in Děčín-Podmokly is a neo-Romanesque building. It was built in 1856–1858. The interior was painted by Joseph von Führich.

The Evangelical church in Děčín-Podmokly was built in 1881–1884. It is a three-nave eclectic building.

The Church of Saint Wenceslaus is located in Děčín-Rozbělesy. Built in 1723–1783, it was designed by Kilian Ignaz Dientzenhofer.

The synagogue in Děčín-Podmokly was built in 1906–1907 in the faux Oriental style with Art Nouveau elements. During World War II, it lost its function and served as a warehouse. In 1994, it was returned to the local Jewish community. Today the former synagogue serves cultural and social purposes.

=== Bridges ===
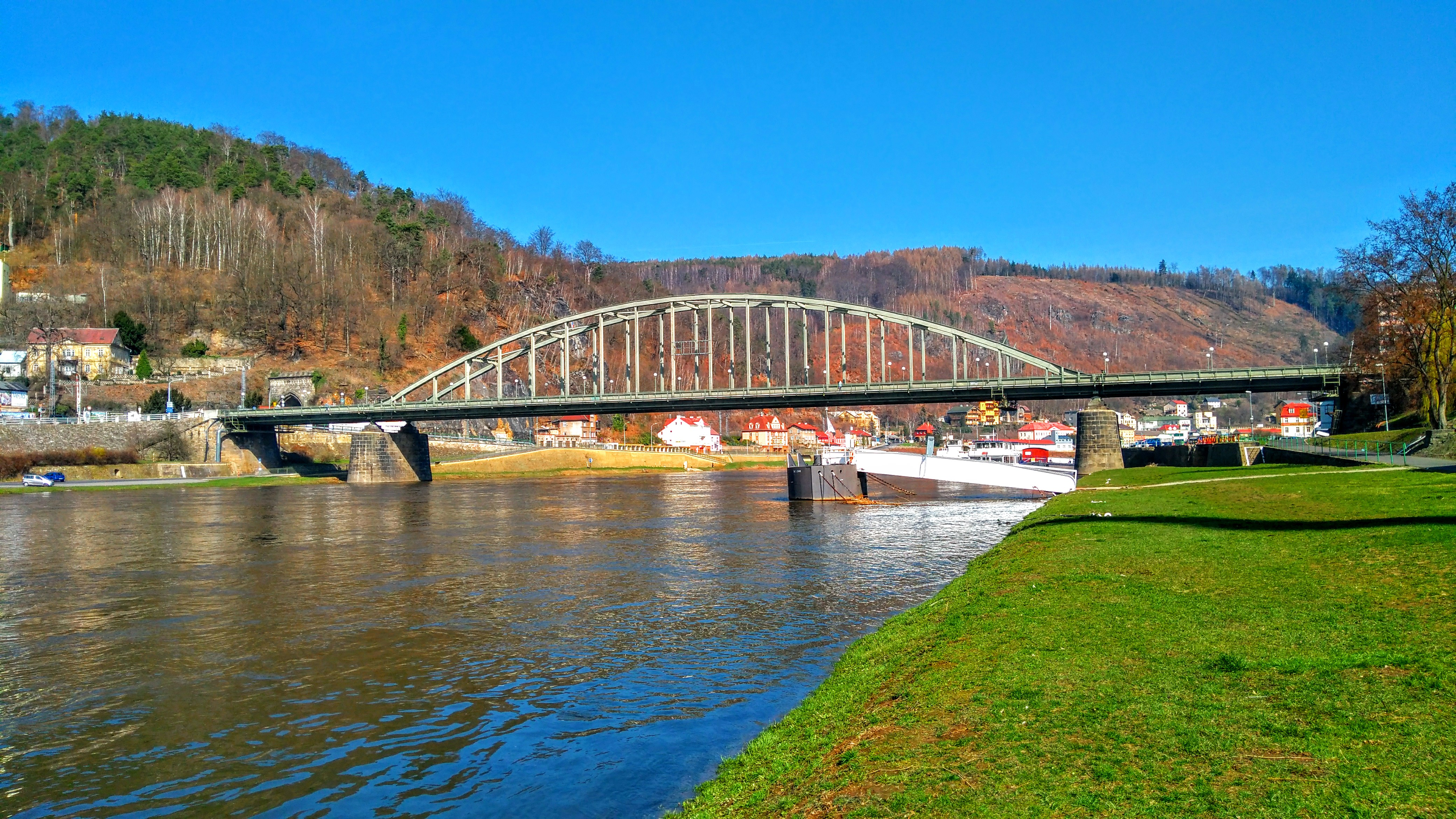
The bridge Tyršův most

Staroměstský most ("Old Town Bridge") dates from 1574. This stone bridge replaced an older stone bridge, destroyed during the 1561 floods. The bridge is decorated by a Baroque sculpture group of Saints Vitus, Wenceslaus and John of Nepomuk, created by Michael Brokoff in 1714.

Ovčí můstek ("Sheep Bridge") is a small Renaissance bridge from 1561. The bridge is significantly arched to protect it from floods.

Tyršův most ("Tyrš Bridge") is one of the main landmarks of Děčín. This steel bridge was built in 1933 on the site of the older Empress Elisabeth Bridge, which was no longer suitable for increased traffic. The steel structure is supported by modified pillars from the original bridge. The bridge was named in honour of the local native Miroslav Tyrš.

=== Other ===
In the Elbe near the left bank stands a basalt hunger stone, which is visible only when water levels are low. It is one of the oldest hydrological monuments in Central Europe. It is an indicator of drought in the region. The oldest legible record for which the time of origin is verified dates from 1616.

The most visited tourist destination in the city is Děčín Zoo. It was founded in 1948.

== Notable people ==
- Wenzeslaus of Thun (1629–1673), clergyman and bishop
- Anton Kern (1710–1747), painter
- Johann Münzberg (1799–1878), textile manufacturer in Bohemia
- Miroslav Tyrš (1832–1884), philosopher and sports organiser
- Franz, Prince of Thun and Hohenstein (1847–1916), Austro-Hungarian politician
- Adolf Wilhelm (1864–1950), Austrian classical philologist and epigrapher
- Johann Radon (1887–1956), mathematician
- Julius Arigi (1891–1985), Austro-Hungarian fighter pilot
- Johanna Haarer (1900–1988), German-Austrian writer
- Maria Paudler (1903–1990), German actress
- Hans-Georg Münzberg (1916–2000), German engineer
- Egon Klepsch (1930–2010), German politician
- Heinrich Hora (born 1931) German-Australian theoretical physicist
- Wolfgang Jeschke (1936–2015), German sci-fi author
- Bronislava Volková (1946–2026), Czech-American poet and translator
- Jiří Bartoška (1947–2025), actor and the president of the Karlovy Vary International Film Festival
- Dana Chladek (born 1963), American slalom kayaker
- Jaroslava Fabiánová (born 1965), serial killer
- Vladimír Šmicer (born 1973), footballer
- Jan Švec (born 1975), media pedagogue
- Karolína Kurková (born 1984), model

== Twin towns – sister cities ==
Děčín is twinned with:

- Bełchatów, Poland
- Jonava, Lithuania
- Pirna, Germany
- Přerov, Czech Republic
- Ružomberok, Slovakia

== Gallery ==
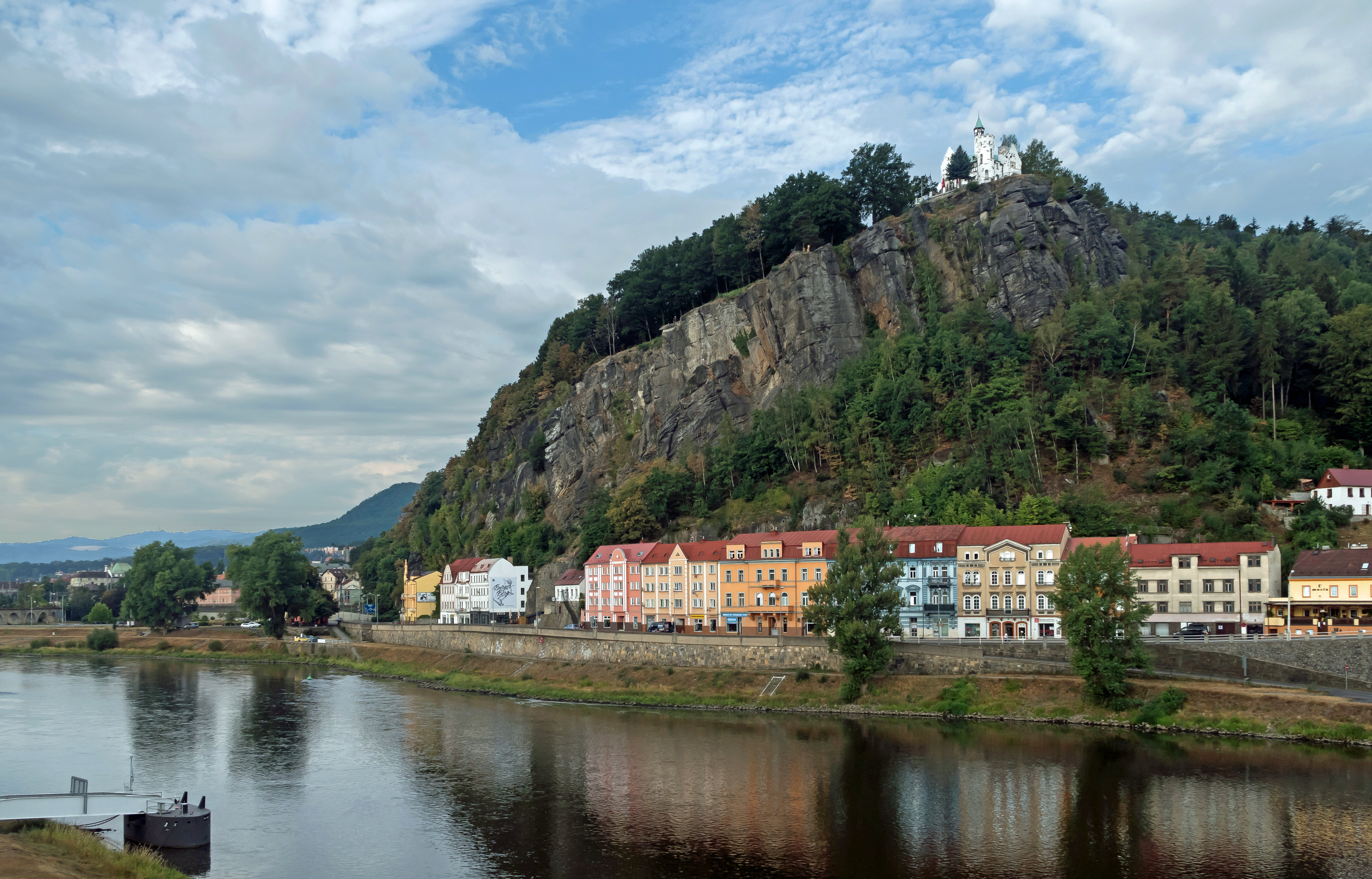
Left bank of the Elbe with Pastýřská stěna

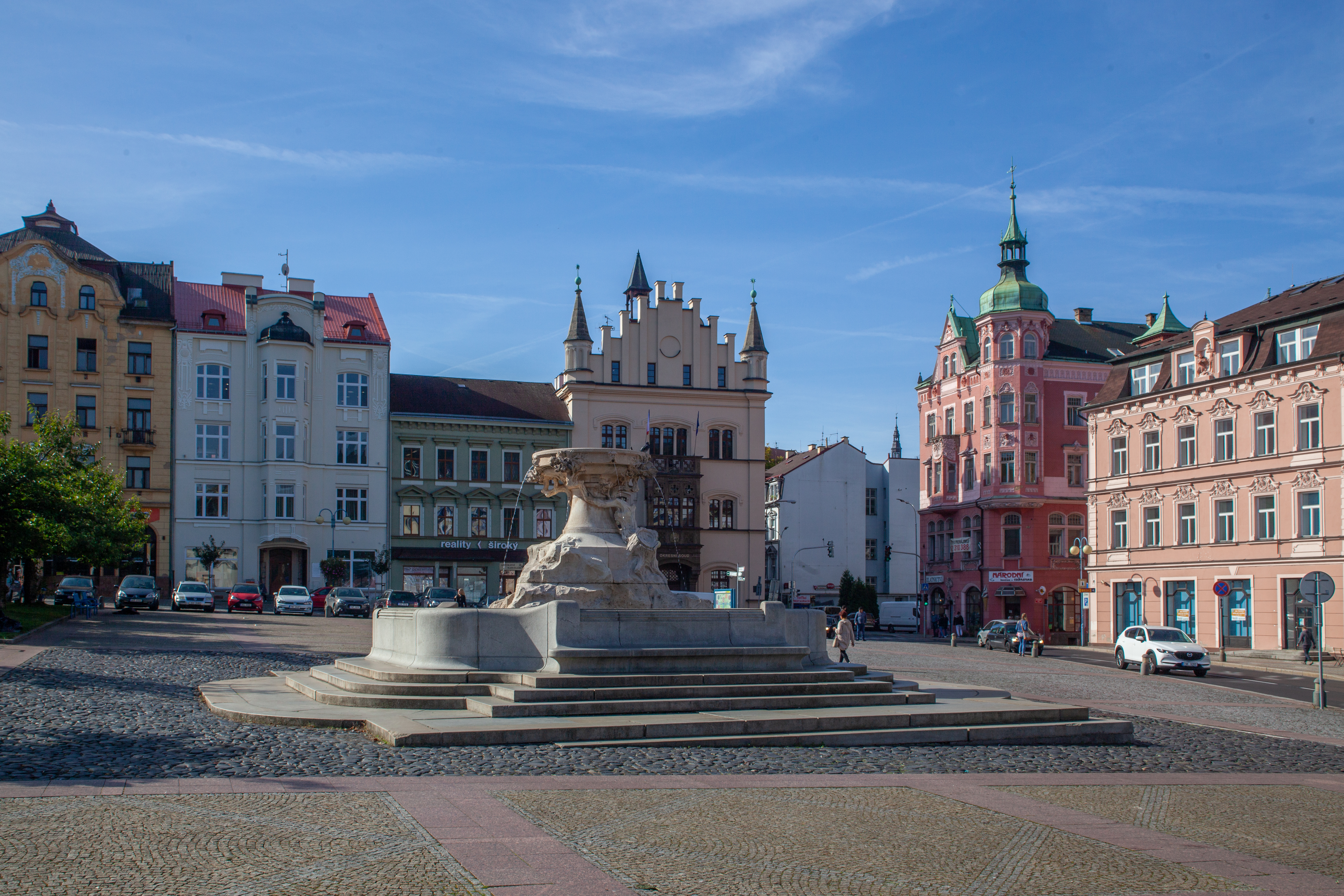
The square Masarykovo náměstí

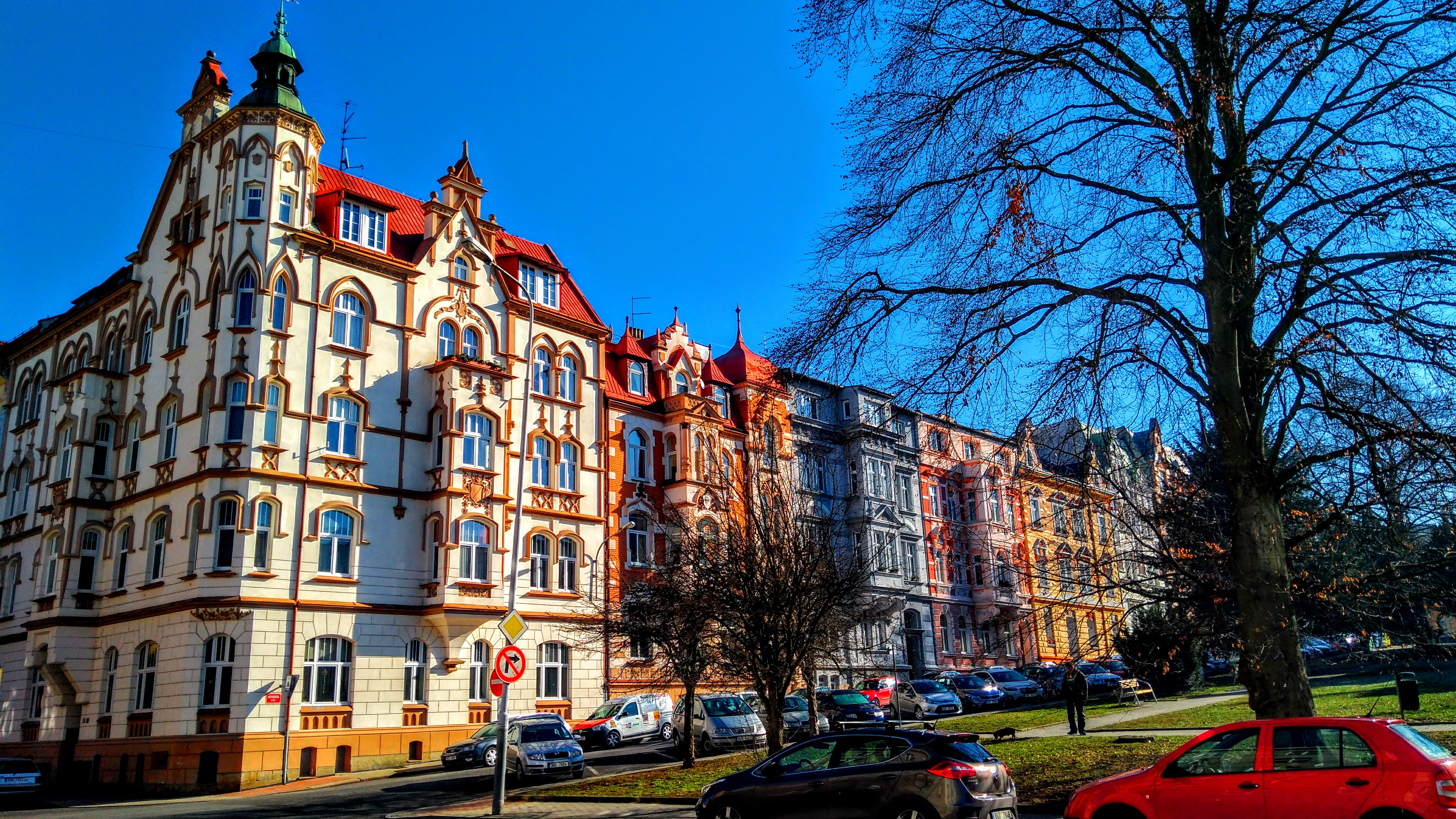
28. října Street

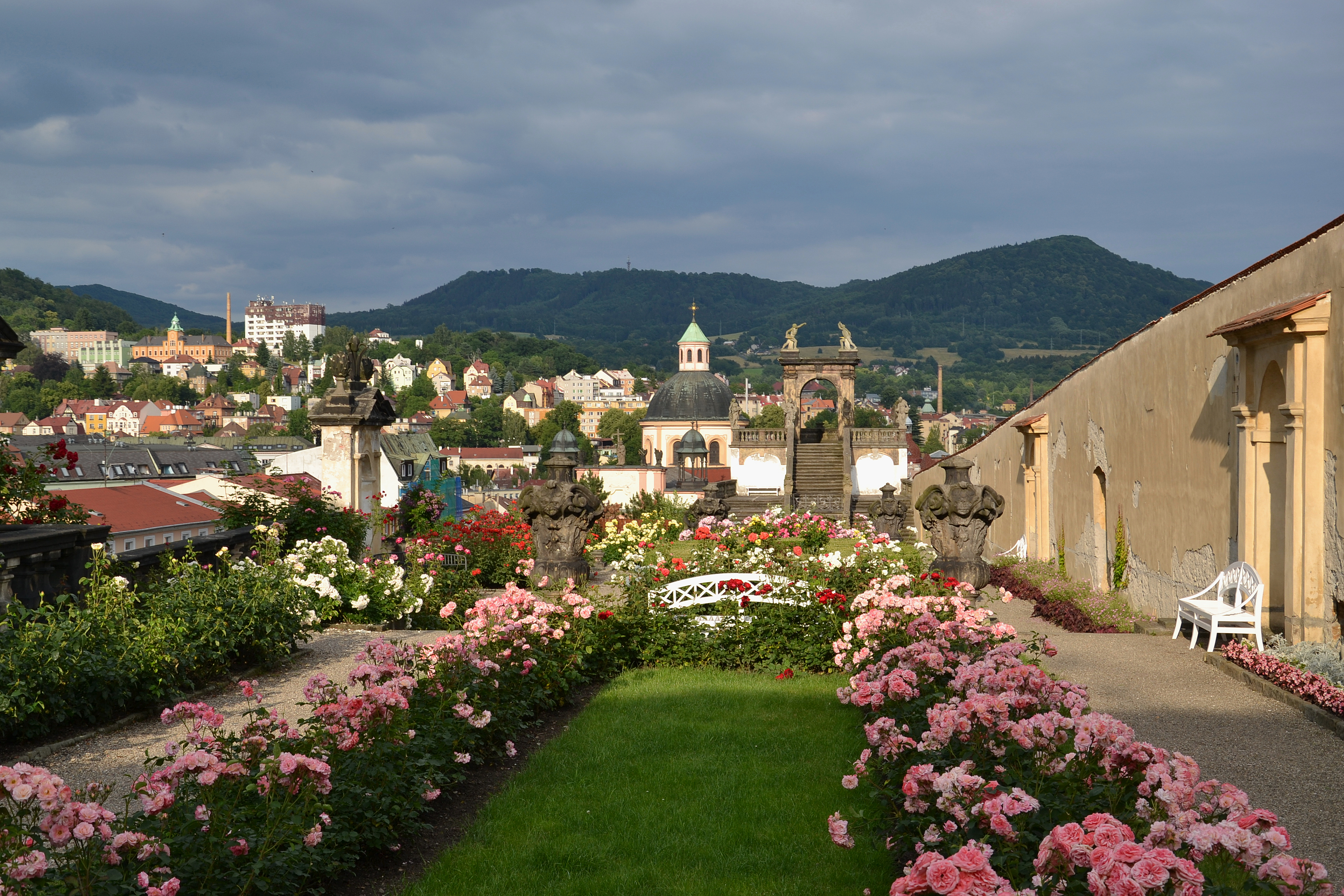
Děčín Castle's Rose Garden

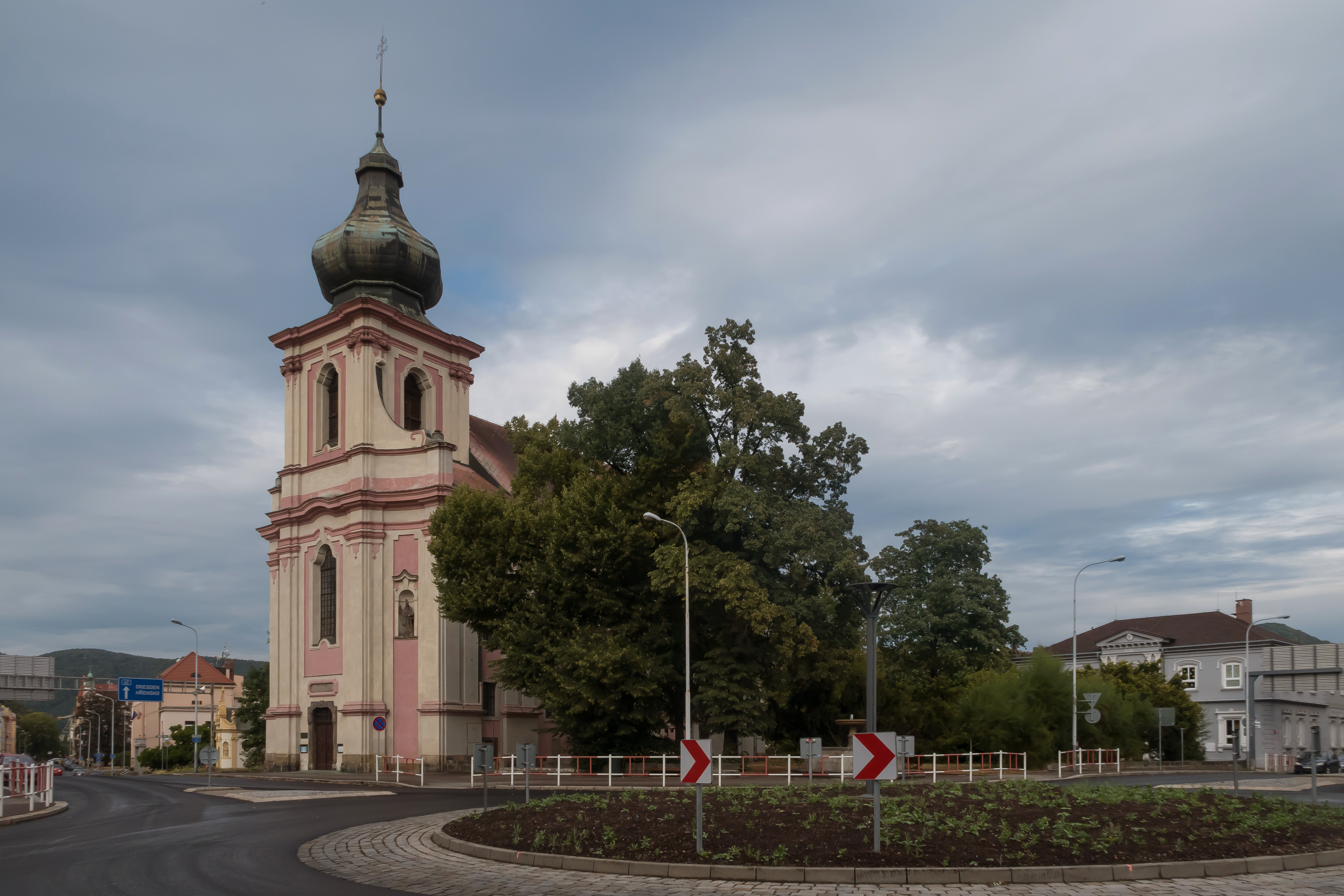
Church of Saints Wencelaus and Blaise

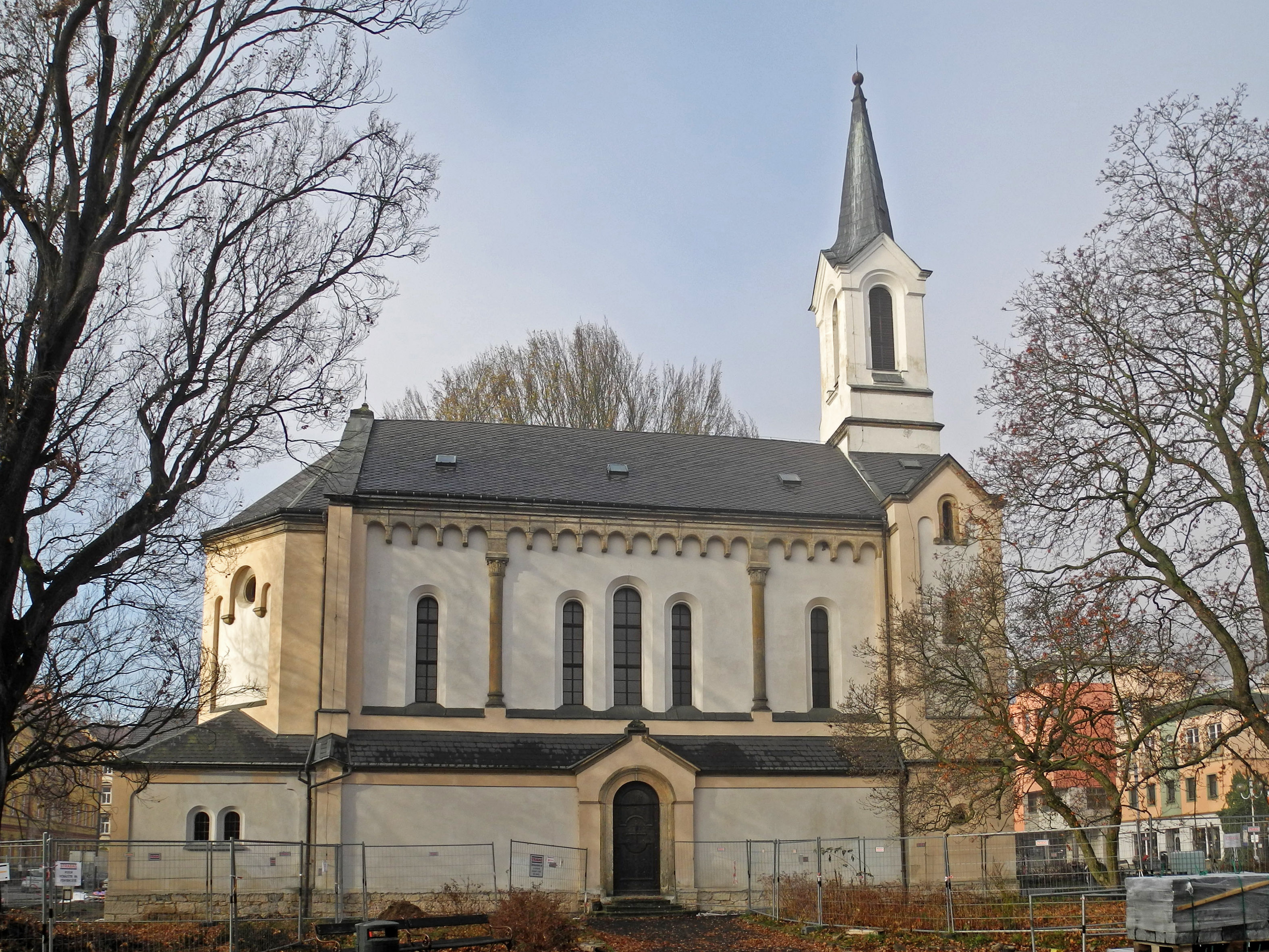
Church of Saint Francis of Assisi

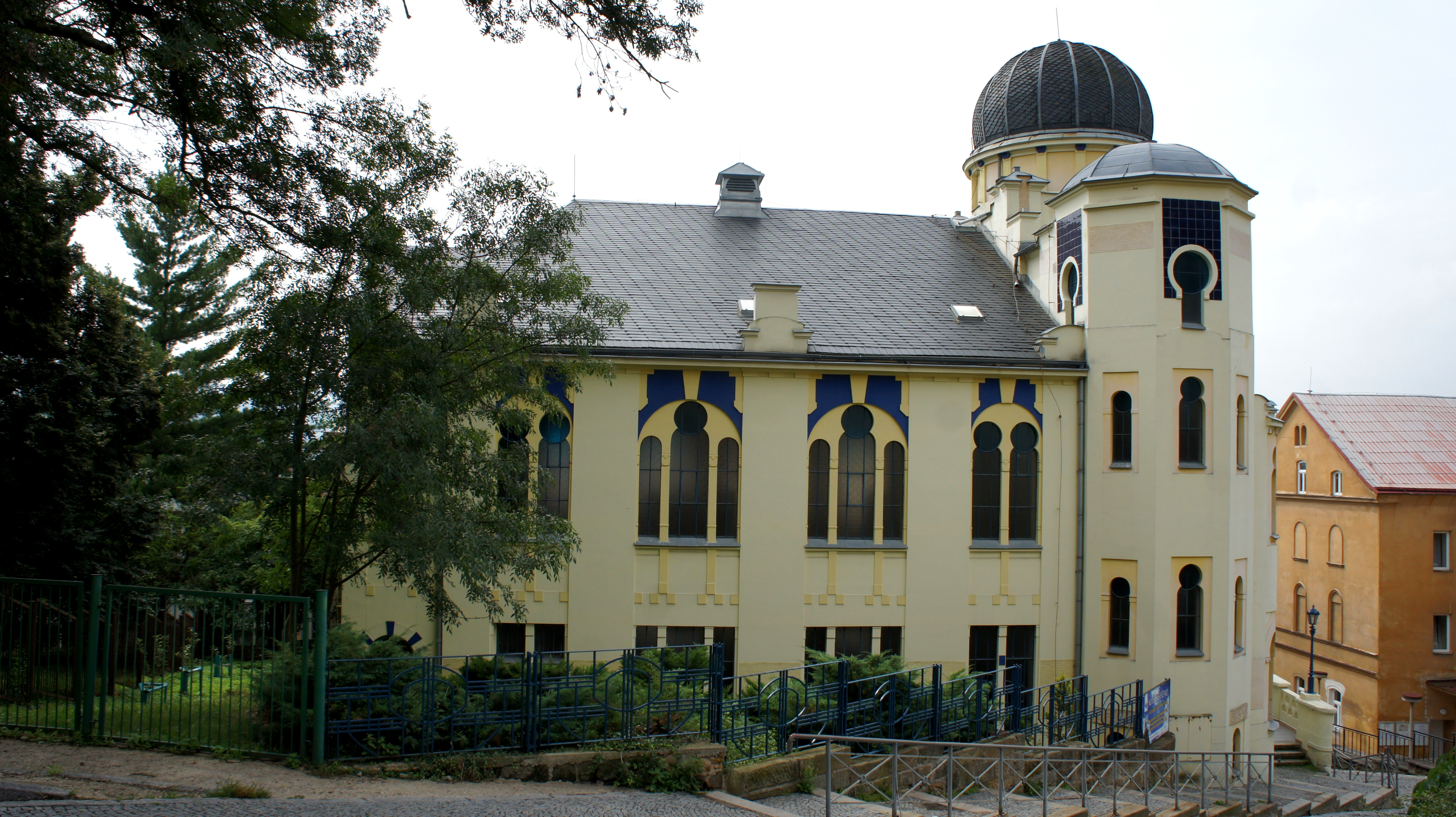
Former synagogue
