= Johanna Haarer =

German-Austrian author

- Born: 3 October 1900; Podmokly, Bohemia, Austria-Hungary
- Died: 30 April 1988 (aged 87); Munich, West Germany
- Occupations: Pulmonologist, author
- Writing career
- Language: German
- Period: 1934–1962
- Subject: Pedagogy
- Notable works: Die deutsche Mutter und ihr erstes Kind (1934); Mutter, erzähl von Adolf Hitler (1939)

Johanna Haarer (3 October 1900 – 30 April 1988) was a German-Austrian physician and author.

Haarer obtained her doctorate in medicine in 1925, but gave up her career as a doctor in 1932 after she married and had children. She began writing articles on parenting and baby care for Die deutsche Frau, the weekly supplement of the Nazi Party newspaper Völkischer Beobachter. The popularity of her articles led to the publication of her first book, Die deutsche Mutter und ihr erstes Kind (The German Mother and Her First Child), in 1934, which became the best-selling parenting guide in Nazi Germany. During the Third Reich, she was the most successful author of educational literature within the Nazi ideology.

After the Second World War, she was imprisoned for a year in American-run internment camps because of her involvement in the NSDAP and her party membership. In the post-war years, her involvement in the Nazi regime prevented her from opening her own medical practice, and for that reason she worked as a pulmonologist for the West-German government until 1965.

Until the 1970s, she was considered an influential figure in the field of child rearing. Her debut book was reprinted, in a modified form, until 1987. A total of 1.2 million copies of the book were sold.

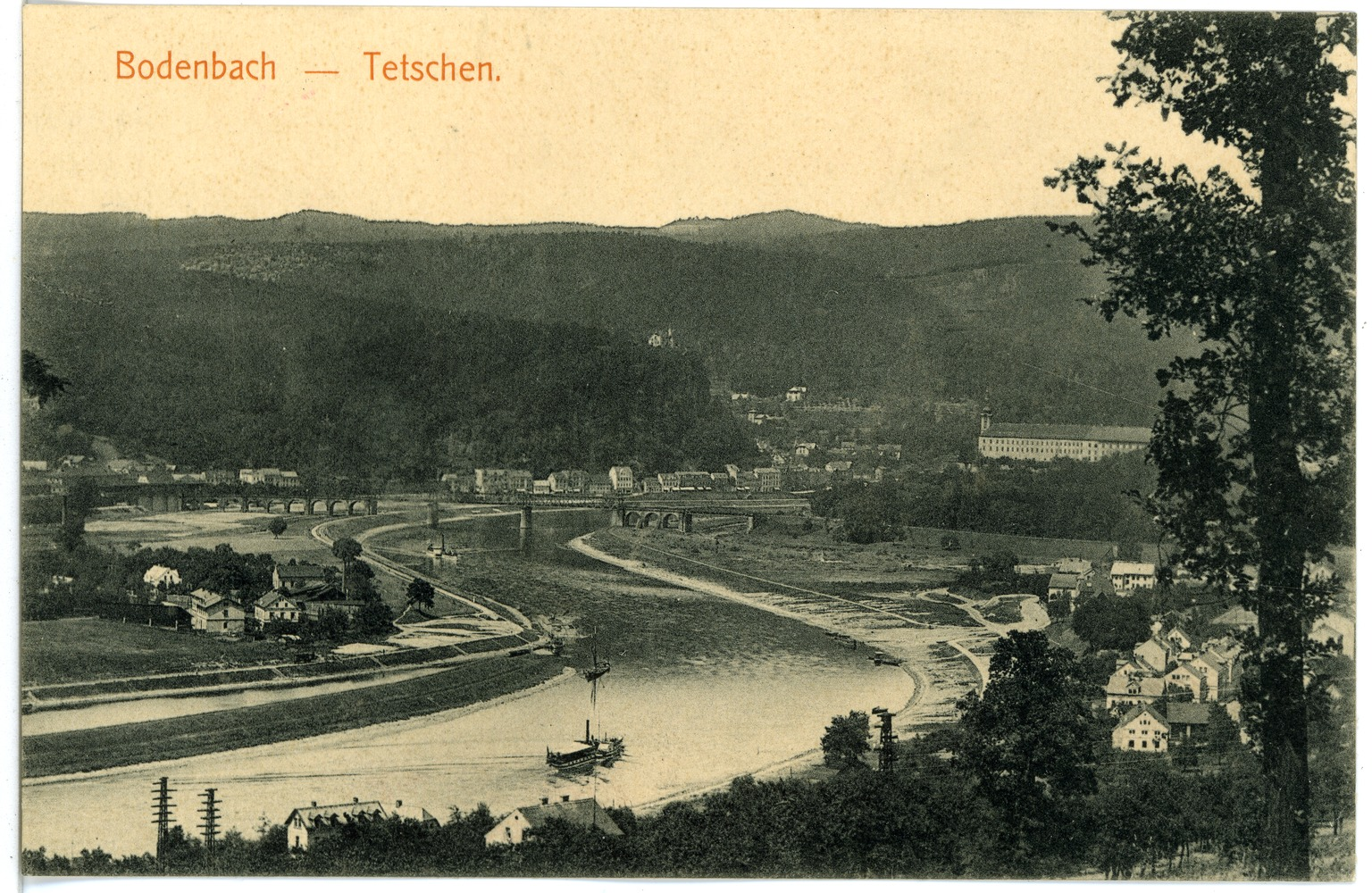
The towns of Podmokly and Děčín with the river Elbe running through the middle.

== Childhood ==
Johanna "Hanni" Haarer was born on 3 October 1900 in Podmokly, Bohemia, Austria-Hungary (today part of Děčín in the Czech Republic) as Johanna Barsch. She was the daughter of Alois Barsch and Anna Fremrová. She had a brother, Georg, who was two years older than her, who died of meningitis when he was ten years old. Her father was a bookbinder and came from a German-speaking family. Her mother's family came from a small town near Plzeň in the Bohemia. Haarer was raised by her Czech grandmother for the first two years of her life. When her father discovered that she only spoke Czech, he sent her grandmother away. Later, Haarer spoke both Czech and German.

Her parents owned an office supply store in Podmokly, but due to her father's alcohol problems, it was mainly her mother who worked in the shop. Haarer had a complex relationship with her parents. Her father suffered from depression throughout his life and had a deformity in his back. He tried to compensate for his feelings of inferiority by speaking German and seeking connection with the upper social classes. In addition, he developed strong anti-Semitic views. However, his excessive alcohol consumption dominated his daily life. As an eight-year-old child, Haarer regularly had to pick up her father from pubs when he had drunk too much. Nevertheless, she preferred him to her mother, whom she perceived as a strict woman who treated her with contempt when she disobeyed. Her mother was emotionally very distant and addressed Haarer as “child” instead of using her first name.

== Education ==
After completing primary school in 1914, she helped out in her parents' office supply store, even though she would have preferred to obtain her Abitur so that she could study medicine in Germany. Her mother was opposed to her plans, but her father agreed. Initially, he chose the Dürer School in Hochwaldhausen for his daughter, but changed his mind after noticing that most of the teachers and pupils were Jewish. Then, when she was sixteen, he enrolled her in the German nationalist boarding school Hermann-Lietz-Schule in the hamlet of Haubinda in Thuringia. Haarer was the only female student there. She then went to boarding school in Bieberstein in Hesse, where she graduated in 1920.

After graduating from high school, she studied medicine in Heidelberg, Göttingen and Munich. In Munich, she was taught by Friedrich von Müller, Ernst von Romberg, Ferdinand Sauerbruch and Walter Straub, among others, who were known as highly influential doctors during this period. During her training, in 1924, she married medical student Hellmut Weese, but the marriage lasted only five years. According to her, it was a case of “true love”, but the two were too different. In addition, her husband was unfaithful. When she found out that one of his extramarital partners was pregnant with his child, she filed for divorce.

In 1925, she passed her state examination. During her studies, she developed a keen interest in psychiatry, but disliked the unpredictability of psychiatric patients. For this reason, she chose a topic from pathology for her thesis. She graduated cum laude in 1926 with her thesis “A contribution to the aetiology of internal haemorrhagic pachymeningitis” and obtained a doctorate in medicine.

== Career ==
In 1926, she completed her internship and was licensed to practise medicine. Since it was not possible for her to become a surgeon as a young female doctor, she started volunteering at various hospitals in Munich. She then became a resident in the pulmonology department at the Harlaching Sanatorium in Munich. As a medical assistant, Haarer was able to support herself, but as a divorced woman she felt socially isolated. At the sanatorium she met chief physician Otto Haarer, and the two married in 1932. In January of the following year, their twins were born. According to her, a career, marriage and children were incompatible, so after marriage, she gave up her job as a doctor. The couple had a total of five children: four girls and one boy.

After the birth of her twins, she began writing articles about baby care. She approached the daily newspaper Münchner Neuesten Nachrichten, but they were not interested in publishing her pieces. After being rejected by the newspaper, she contacted the Völkischer Beobachter, the official newspaper of the Nazi Party. Her articles were published in the weekly supplement called Die deutsche Frau. In her articles, she addressed young women to guide them towards motherhood. Haarer was concerned about the large number of childless families and children growing up in poverty in Nazi Germany. According to her, a “worldview that was hostile to children” was the cause of the declining birth rate. She believed that every marriage should produce four children in order to counteract the ageing population in Nazi Germany. Because her articles were well received, she wrote ten more.

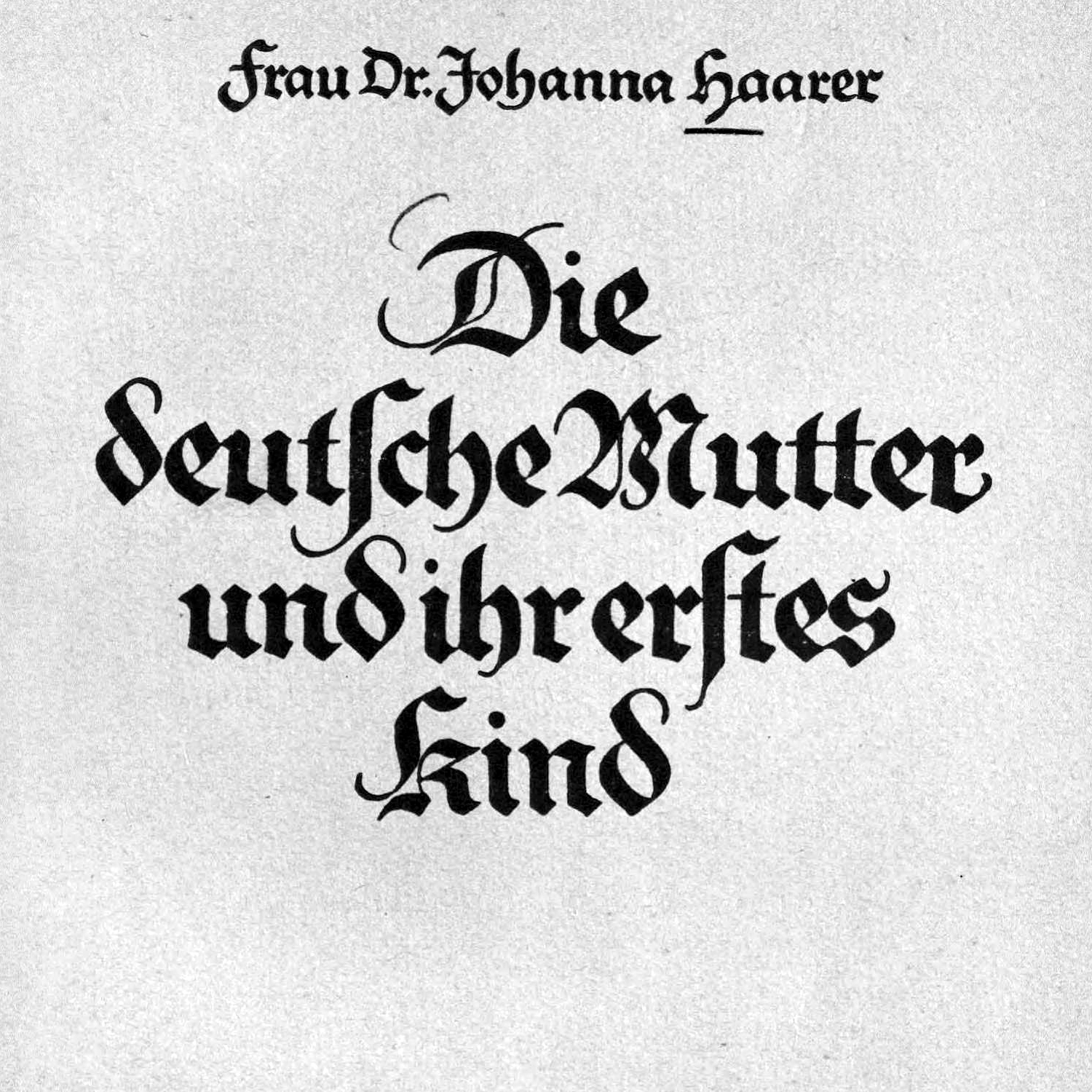
Cover of the book Die deutsche Mutter und ihr erstes Kind (The German Mother and Her First Child)

=== Start literary career ===
Haarer was asked to compile her advice, and in 1934 her first book, Die deutsche Mutter und ihr erstes Kind (The German Mother and Her First Child), was published by Carl Gerber Verlag. The first edition, with a print run of approximately 10,000 copies, sold out within a week. From 1935 onwards, the book was published by J.F. Lehmanns Verlag, a publisher of medical literature. Her name appeared on the covers of the books with her doctor title, which gave the outside world the impression that she was a paediatrician.

The book translated Nazi ideas into concrete parenting advice. Much of her advice was based on Adolf Hitler's book Mein Kampf. The book focuses on order, cleanliness, regularity, toughening up and absolute obedience, because this would make children obedient and employable members of National Socialist society. According to Haarer, parenting was a “power struggle” between mother and child, and gentleness would lead to the development of “domestic tyrants”. The book became a standard work in parenting literature.

After the publication of her first book, she regularly wrote articles for the Münchener Medizinische Wochenschrift, which was also owned by J.F. Lehmanns Verlag, the Völkischer Beobachter and for NS-Frauen-Warte, the Nazi magazine for women published by the Nationalsozialistische Frauenschaft. She also gave regular radio interviews on pregnancy and childcare. Her income grew thanks to her book sales. Together with her husband, she bought a large house in Munich's Schwabing district and invited her parents from the Sudetenland to move in with them.

In 1936, she published the book Unsere kleinen Kinder (Our Little Children), which was aimed at parents with children aged between two and six. Because the head of the publishing house was an influential Nazi, her works quickly found their way into library collections. In addition, her first book was used as a standard work in the Mütterschulen (mothers' schools) of the Reichsmütterdienst (Reich Mothers' Service) of the National Socialist Women's League.

=== Connection with the NSDAP ===
In the same year that her second book was published, she was recruited by the NSDAP. She volunteered as a district worker for racial policy issues at the National Socialist Women's League. She was also involved in the National Socialist People's Welfare Organisation (NSV), the Hilfswerk Mutter und Kind (Mother and Child Aid Organisation) and the Mütterschulen (Mothers' School) in Munich. A year after she started volunteering for the NSDAP, she became a member of the party on 1 May 1937, at the insistence of Otto Nippold, deputy party leader of the Munich-Upper Bavaria district.

In 1937, she published the books Säuglingspflege für junge Mädchen (Infant Care for Young Girls) and Unterrichtsbuch für Schulen en Mutterschaft und Familienpflege im neuen Reich (Textbook for Schools on Motherhood and Family Care in the New Reich), both of which were strongly influenced by Nazi ideology. During her lectures, she emphasised the importance of preserving traditional motherhood and family values. She was strongly opposed to abortion, contraception and the image of women that had been formed during the Weimar Republic, which she believed had prevented many women from becoming mothers. She praised the measures taken by the Nazi regime, including the large-scale dismissal of women from the workforce. According to Haarer, starting a family was the natural role of women.

In 1938, after the birth of her fourth child, she resigned from her voluntary position with the National Socialist Women's League. That year, she spent a school year teaching health education at the Munich City Kindergarten Teachers' Seminary. She also taught race studies and genetics at the youth leaders' school. The director of the schools, Maria Urban, was very enthusiastic about Haarer as a teacher. According to Urban, she had managed to convince several girls to join the Nationalsozialistische Frauenschaft, the women's organisation of the NSDAP, or the Nationalsozialistische Volkswohlfahrt (NSV).

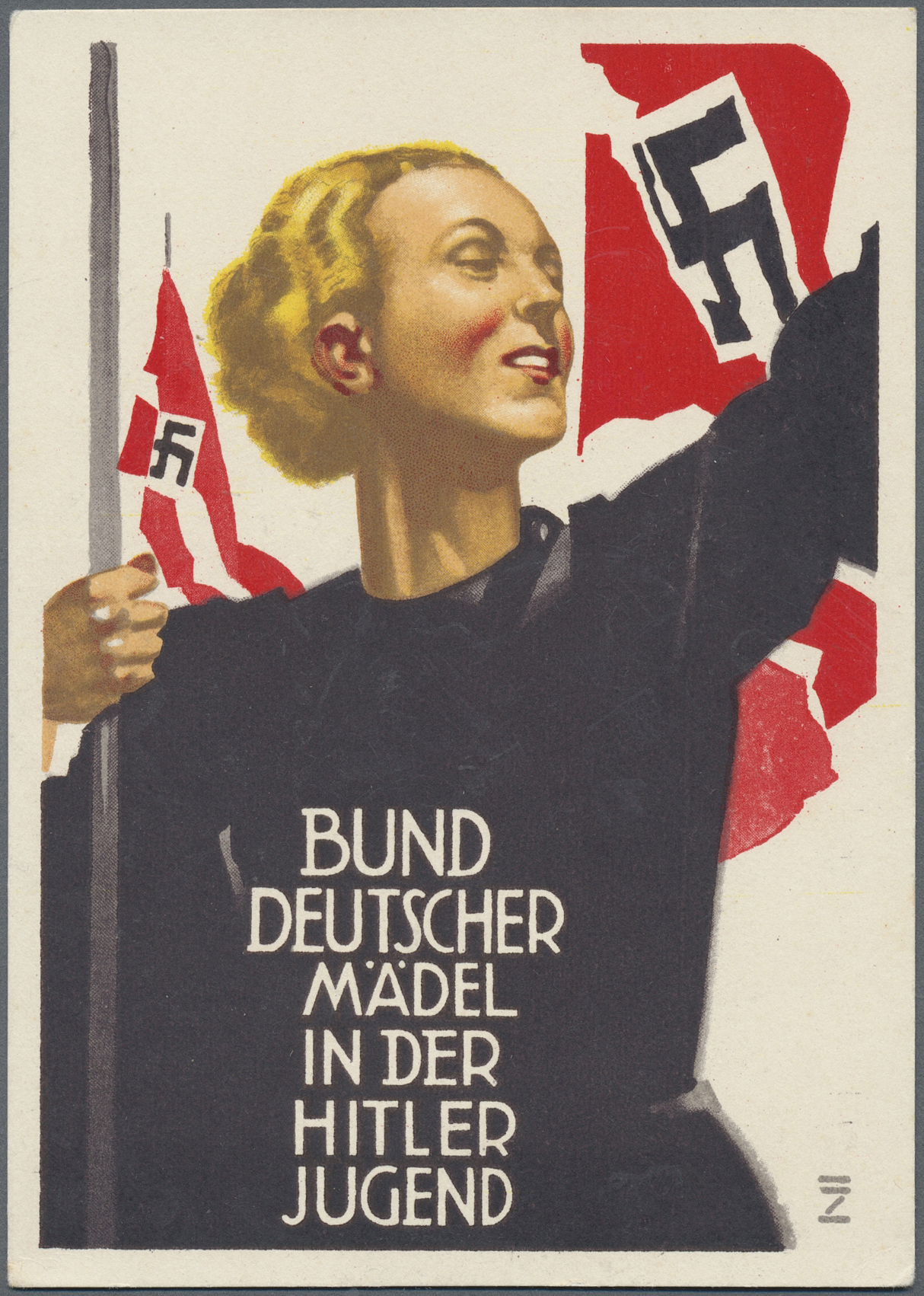
Propaganda poster for the League of German Girls (1933)

=== Mutter, erzähl von Adolf Hitler ===
Shortly before the outbreak of World War II in 1939, her anti-Semitic and anti-communist children's book Mutter, erzähl von Adolf Hitler (Mother, Tell Me About Adolf Hitler) was published, about the rise of the Third Reich, in which Adolf Hitler was given a heroic role. Children were encouraged in the book to join the Bund Deutscher Mädel or the Hitler Youth, and the book became required reading in kindergartens. She wrote the book on behalf of the NSDAP, and its publication earned her admission to the Reich Chamber of Literature.

Despite paper shortages and austerity measures during the war years, the book continued to be reprinted, with new editions adapted as new territories were occupied by Nazi Germany. In the Netherlands, the book was published in 1942 by Westland Publishers. It was translated into Dutch by Steven Barends, who also translated Mein Kampf.

== Post-war years ==
At the end of the war, Munich was heavily bombed and the family was evacuated to a guesthouse in Haag, in Upper Bavaria. In May 1945, Haarer was arrested by the American occupying forces. She was imprisoned in American-run internment camps in Stephanskirchen, Moosburg and Ludwigsburg until September 1946. Haarer was not informed why she had been arrested or what she was accused of. She worked as a doctor in the internment camps. Her husband was not a member of the NSDAP, but was part of the armed forces during the war. After his return, he was left alone to care for their five children and his elderly parents-in-law due to his wife's internment. In desperation, he committed suicide in April 1946 by jumping off the Großhesseloher Bridge in southern Munich into the Isar.

After her release, Haarer was denazified. She told the Americans that she had written the book Mutter, erzähl von Adolf Hitler solely for financial reasons. Due to her involvement with the NSDAP and her positions in Nazi organisations, she was not permitted to open her own practice in the post-war years. For this reason, she worked as a pulmonologist for the government. During this period, publishing books remained her main source of income. In East Germany, her book Die deutsche Mutter und ihr erstes Kind was banned, but in West Germany it was republished in a revised form under the title Die Mutter und ihr erstes Kind. The words “Führer” and “Volk” were removed from the text, but the content remained virtually unchanged. The last edition was published in 1987. In addition to reprints of her debut being sold, she also wrote several new works that focused primarily on handicrafts and self-development. In 1962, her last book, Frau sein und gesund bleiben (Being a Woman and Staying Healthy), was published, and Haarer gradually faded into the background as an author. In 1965, she stopped working as a pulmonologist and retired.

=== Final years and death ===
In her final years, Haarer wrote her autobiography, but her life story ended in 1933 and was continued after her internment. She retained her Nazi beliefs throughout her life. According to her, she and her fellow internees had “done nothing wrong”, but had merely “served a state ideology that was recognised worldwide”. She believed that in times of war, all peoples would do everything in their power to “benefit the fatherland”. She also said that she did not wish to comment on “guilt and collective guilt”, but that she was certain that the Germans “wanted the best for our people with all our hearts”.

In the last years of her life, Haarer became increasingly dependent on medication and alcohol due to severe anxiety, and struggled to accept her shortcomings. She died on 30 April 1988 at her home in Munich. She was 87 years old.

== Influence of her parenting methods ==
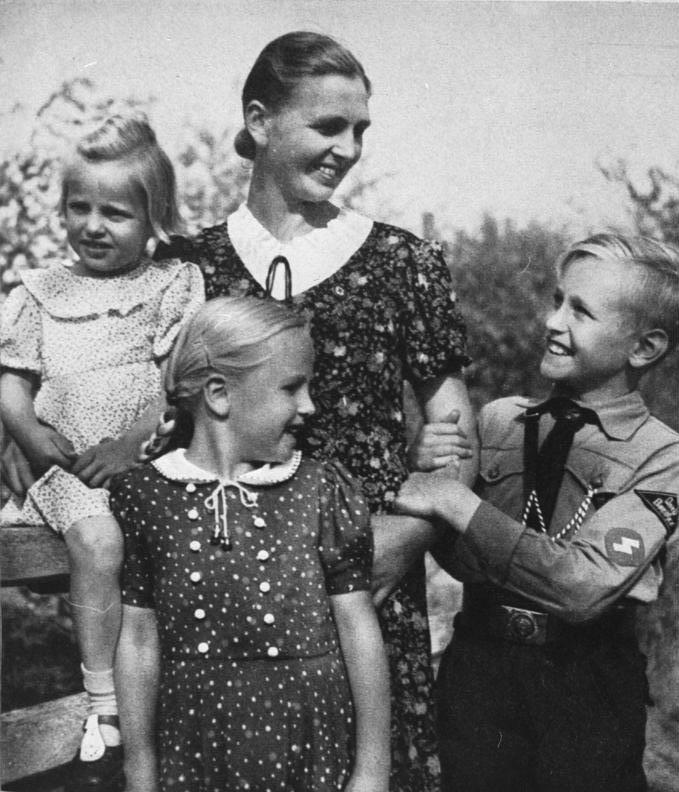
German mother with three children (1943)

Although some experts in the 1930s and 1940s considered her rules for care and upbringing to be harmful, Die deutsche Mutter und ihr erstes Kind became a standard work in Nazi educational literature. Between 1934 and 1945, 690,000 copies of the book were sold. Even after the end of the Second World War, the book remained popular, with the last edition appearing in 1987. A total of 1.2 million copies were sold.

=== Method ===
In the book, Haarer advocated strict parenting that began immediately after the birth of the child. According to Haarer, after the umbilical cord was cut, the baby should be kept in a dark room for 24 hours without food and separated from the mother. She argued that a baby is not yet capable of giving and receiving emotions, and therefore has no need for physical or psychological closeness. It was therefore necessary not to spend time with the child “without reason”.

Apart from washing, changing and feeding the child, parents had to leave the child completely alone: the child would eventually become “weak” if it was showered with affection. If the child cried at night, the mother should ignore it. In this way, the child would learn that crying was pointless, Haarer concluded. When children were held, they should be touched as little as possible and not looked in the eyes. According to Haarer, a baby was a tormentor whose will had to be broken. Children were punished by withholding love or by using violence.

=== Research into the effects ===
Research into the effects of Haarer's parenting methods began in the 1980s, fifty years after the book was first published. The first critical study was conducted by psychologist Ute Benz, who published her findings in 1988. German psychiatrist Hartmut Radebold conducted extensive research on children from the war generation. He argued that parents who strongly identified with the Nazi regime and women who came from broken families were particularly susceptible to Haarer's educational propaganda.

In 1997, social worker Sigrid Chamberlain wrote the book Adolf Hitler, die deutsche Mutter und ihr erstes Kind (Adolf Hitler, the German Mother and Her First Child) about Haarer's parenting methods. According to Chamberlain, a “lack of attachment” (“Bindungslosigkeit”), which makes it difficult for the child to form other attachment relationships later in life, is characteristic of National Socialist upbringing. The child also learned to suppress his feelings, which meant that he could no longer perceive or recognise his own feelings and bodily signals. According to various researchers of Haarer's work, this inner emptiness could then be filled with Nazi ideology and group solidarity.

According to German psychiatrist and psychotherapist Karl-Heinz Brisch, children who were easily seduced, did not think and did not feel were particularly useful for a warring nation. Brisch argues that Haarer's book also had a major impact in the post-war years: ‘Our mothers, and especially our grandmothers, all had the book on their bookshelves and received it as a gift when their children were born. Even after the end of the Second World War.’ His research revealed that individuals raised with Haarer's ideas are more likely to suffer from depression and alcohol addiction, have difficulty recognising their emotions and forming bonds with others because they are insecurely attached.

=== Johanna Haarer's children ===
Gertrud Haarer, Johanna Haarer's youngest daughter, wrote about her experiences with her mother and her childhood memories in the 2012 book Die deutsche Mutter und ihr letztes Kind (The German Mother and Her Last Child). Among other things, she recounted that she was never allowed to sit on her mother's lap and that she was only hugged by her mother once as a child: ‘When [at the liberation] the Americans arrived [...] she took me in her arms, because she knew that Americans love children.’ Despite her difficult relationship with her mother, she described her as: ‘my rock. My highest authority.’

In an interview in 2000, Johanna Haarer's eldest daughter Anna Hutzel said that her mother also applied the advice described in her books within her own family. According to Hutzel, family problems were solved with violence and the children suffered from their mother's emotional coldness.

== Works (selection) ==
- Die deutsche Mutter und ihr erstes Kind (1934)
- Unsere kleinen Kinder. Ernährung und Wachstum, Pflege und Kleidung, Entwicklung und Erziehung (1936)
- Säuglingspflege für junge Mädchen. Unterrichtsbuch für Schulen (1937)
- Mutterschaft und Familienpflege im neuen Reich (1937)
- Mutter, erzähl von Adolf Hitler (1939)
- Die Mutter und ihr erstes Kind (1949), revised edition of Die deutsche Mutter und ihr erstes Kind
- Unsere Schulkinder (1950)
- Mein Strickbuch (1950)
- Gesund und schön durchs Leben gehen. Eine ländliche Gesundheitsfibel (1952)
- Grosse Kinder – grosse Sorgen. Kinder in der Reifezeit (1954), with Esther von Reichlin
- Die Welt des Arztes. Ein medizinisches Buch für Ausländer (1957)
- Kinder auf dem Bauernhof (1957)
- 2. Band: Unser Kind und die Erziehung auf dem Lande (1959), as co-author
- Deutscher Alltag: Ein Gesprächsbuch für Ausländer (1959)
- Frau sein und gesund bleiben (1962)
