= Pastýřská stěna =

Coordinates: 50°46′47.42″N 14°11′54.6″E

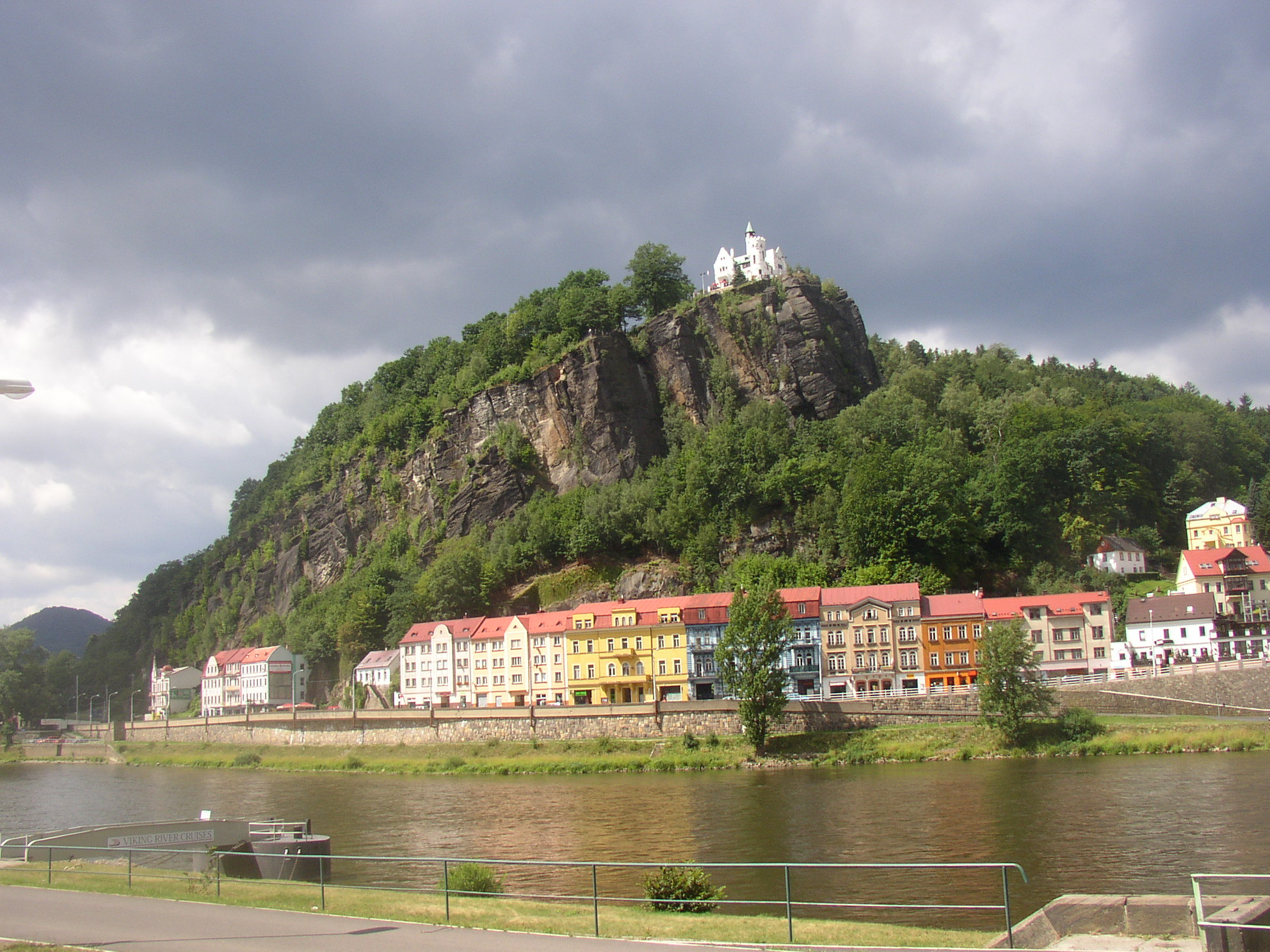
View over Weiher to the Schäferwand

The Pastýřská stěna, also Ovčí stěna (German: Schäferwand, English: Shepherd's Wall), is a sandstone rock massif on the shores of the River Elbe in the borough of Děčín (Tetschen) in the Czech Republic.

== History ==
According to language researchers, the name goes back to the German Schiefe Wand which means "inclined wall". The present Czech name is a translation of its German name, Schäferwand.

As early as the 19th century the Schäferwand (it was then Austrian) was a popular tourist destination due to its striking appearance. As a result it was decided to build a wooden refuge hut that, in 1905, was replaced by a solid wooden building in the shape of a romantic castle. After a period of closure, it reopened as a restaurant in 2016. From the terrace of the restaurant there is a picturesque view of the Elbe valley and Děčín Castle opposite.

After 1945 the zoo from Děčín was moved to the plateau. Within the rock a lift was built from the Elbe road to the hill plateau.

A tunnel on the Dresden–Děčín railway runs through the rock.

For hikers a red signposted trail runs from the station at Děčín to the summit and continues to the Hoher Schneeberg. Hikers had to be rescued by helicopter after falling from the rock in 2024 and 2025.

== Gallery ==
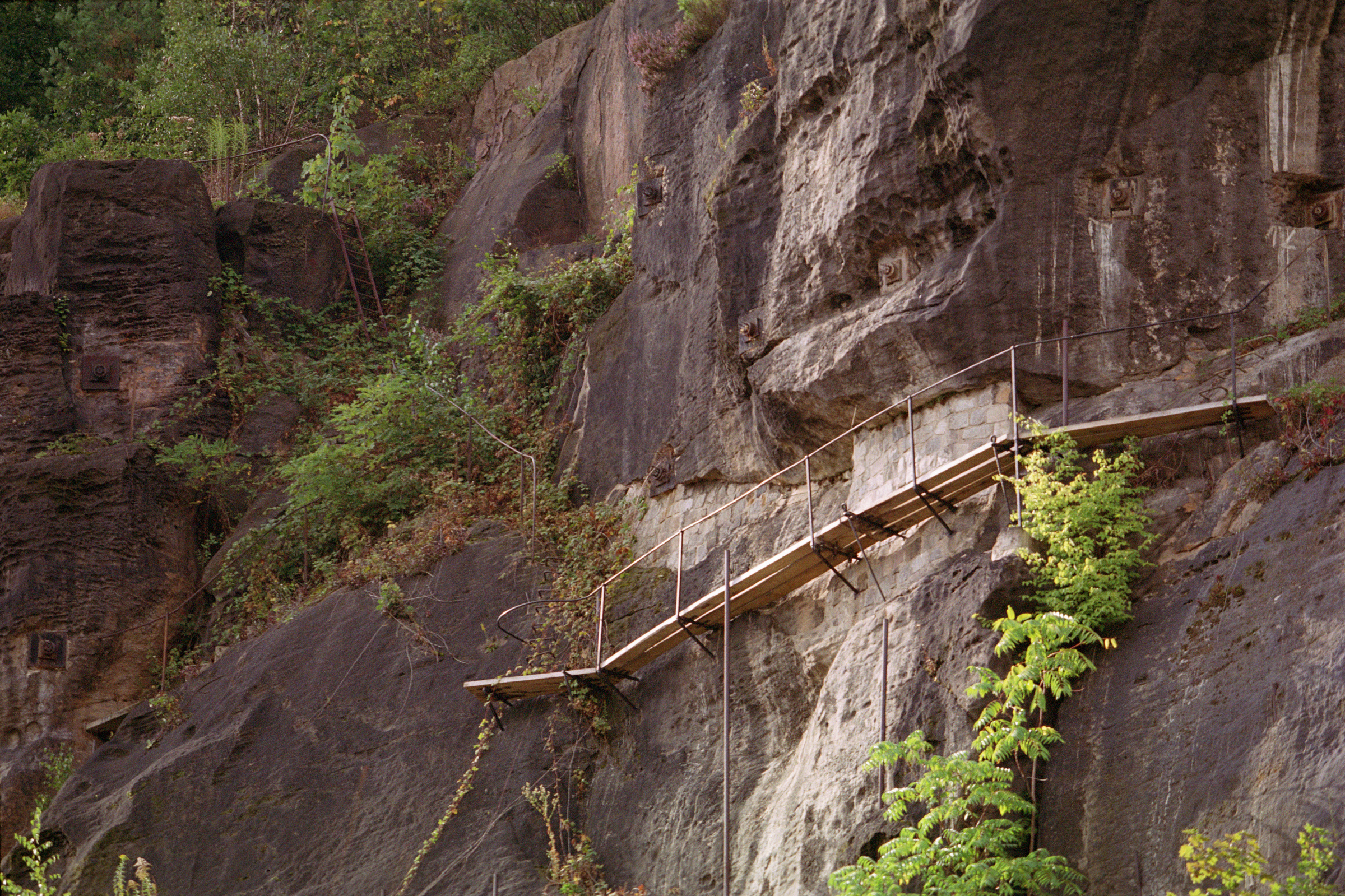
Climbing routes on the Schäferwand

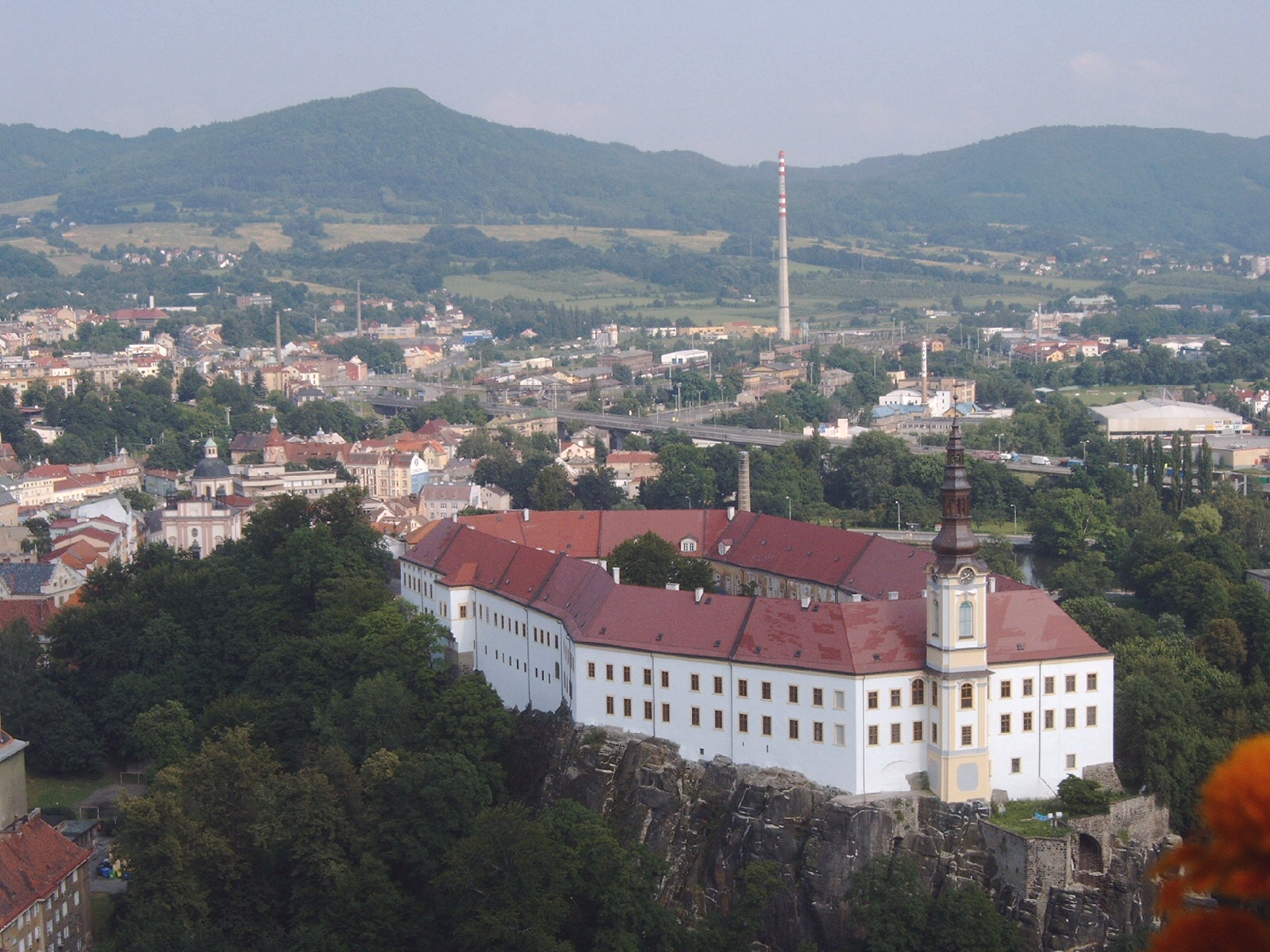
View from the Pastýřská stěna over Děčín to the right bank of the Elbe

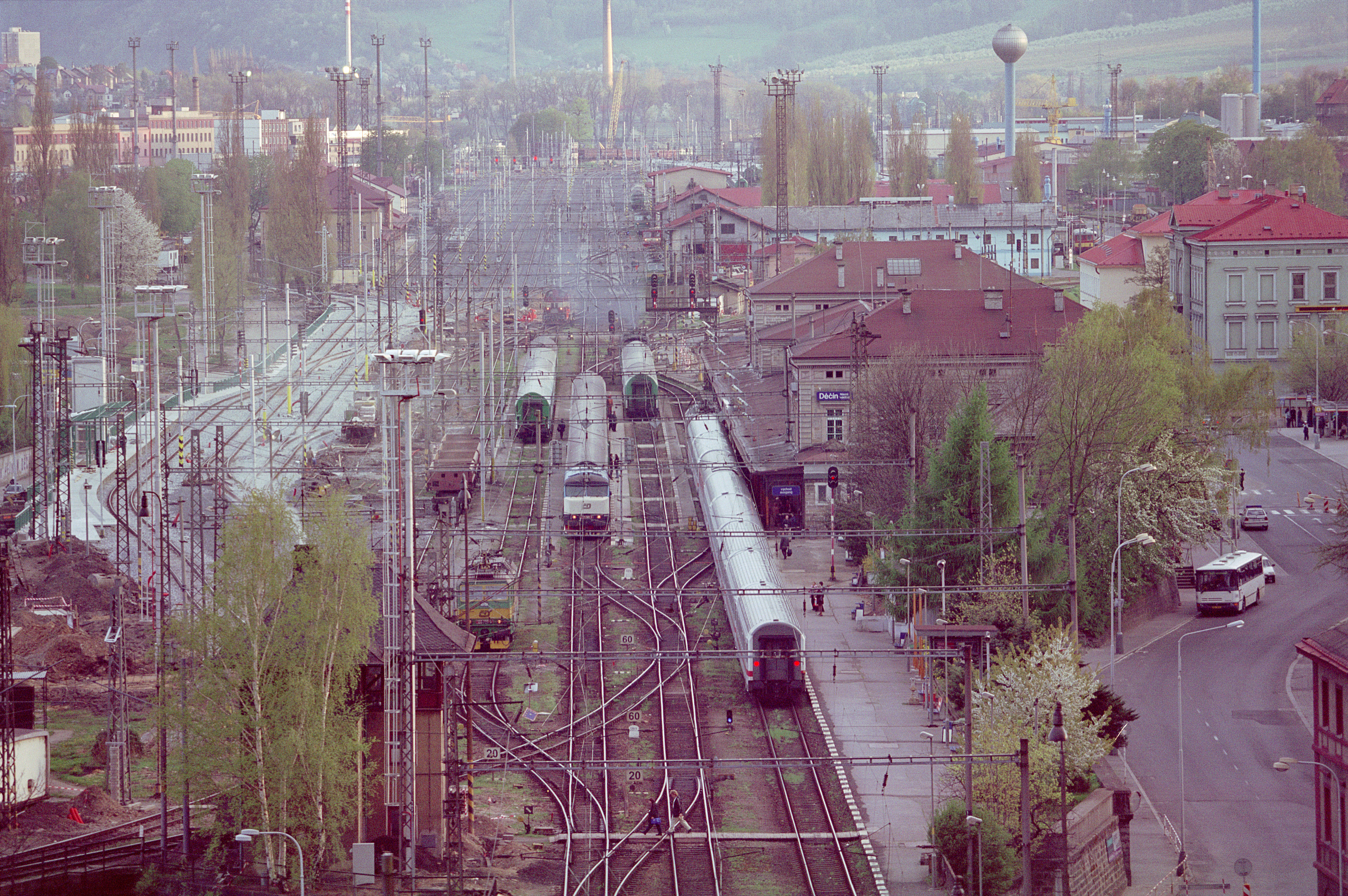
View of the station at Děčín from the Schäferwand

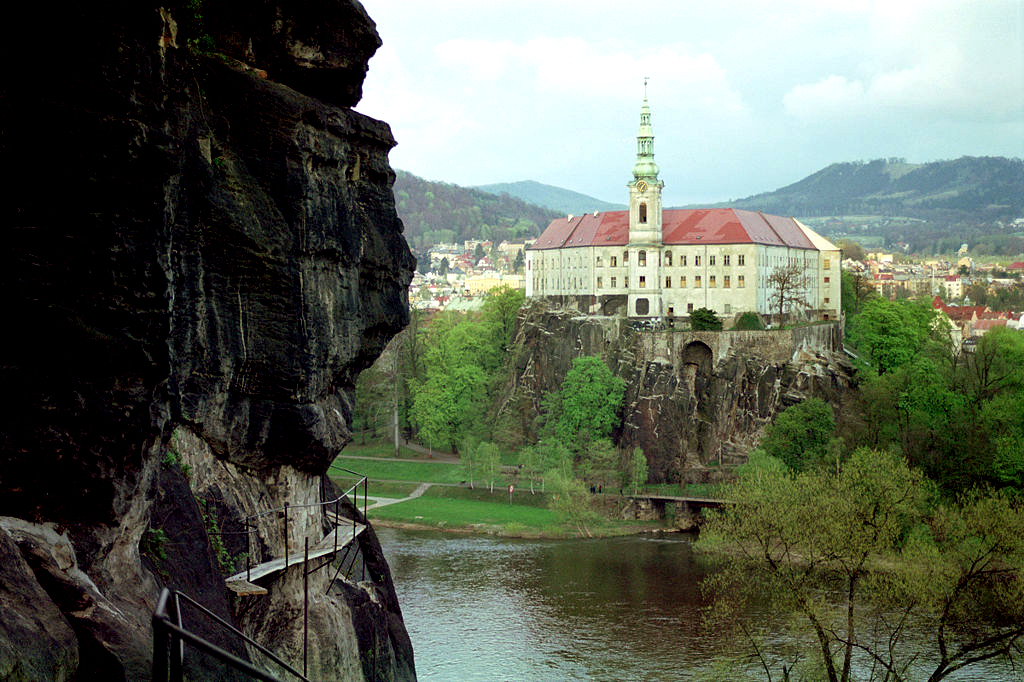
Disused climbing routes on the Schäferwand and view of the castle
