= Bronislava Volková =

Czech-American poet and academic (1946–2026)

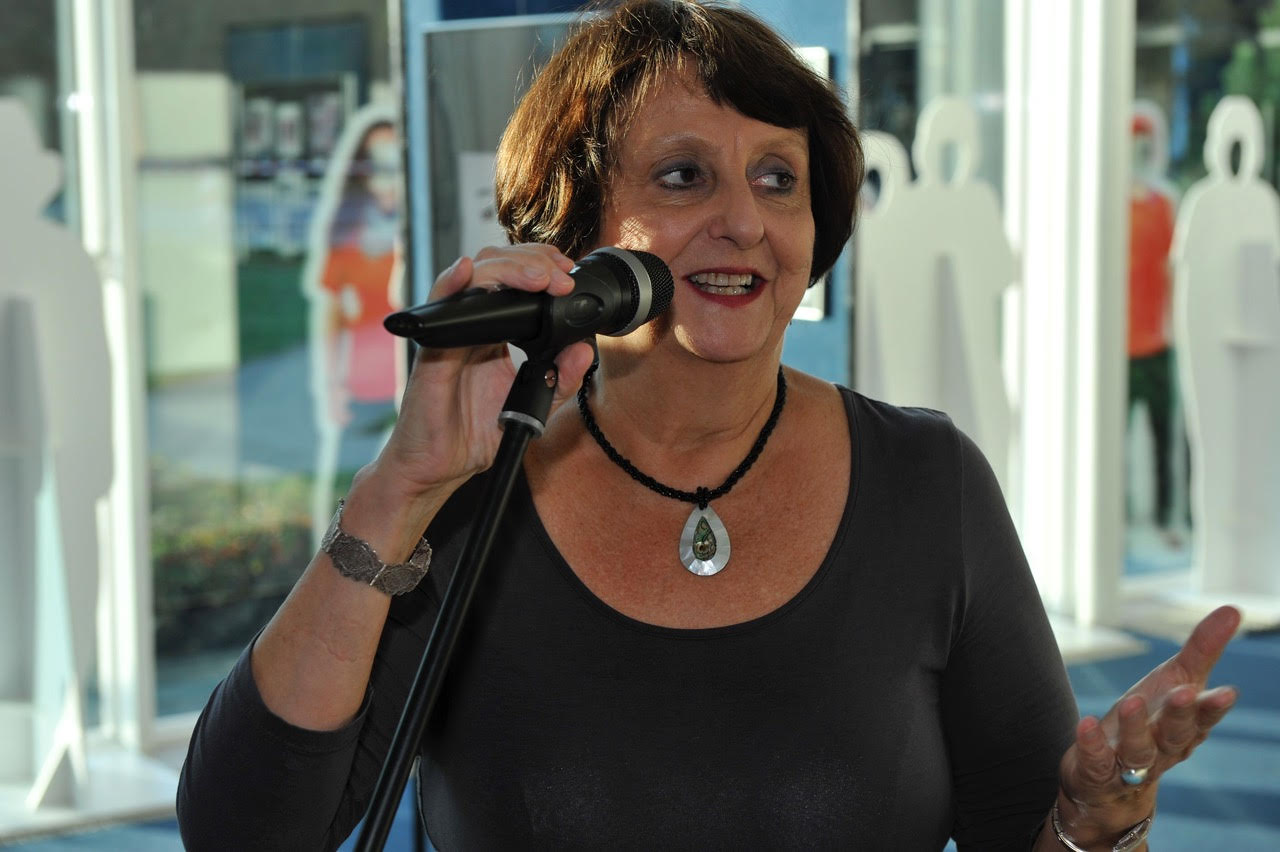
- Volková in 2014
- Born: Bronislava Fischerová; May 15, 1946; Děčín, Czechoslovakia
- Died: October 29, 2026 (aged 80)
- Occupations: Semiotician, poet, literary historian, translator, scholar
- Website: bronislavavolkova.com/eng/

Bronislava Volková (born Bronislava Fischerová; May 15, 1946 – October 29, 2026) was a Czech-American poet, translator, scholar and collage artist. She emigrated from Czechoslovakia in 1974 and spent more than 40 years in the United States.

== Life and work ==
Her father Štěpán Fischer was a machine engineer. and her mother Markéta Morenová (pseudonym Gita Morenová) was a violin virtuoso. Volková grew up in Prague, where she went to primary and secondary school. In 1969, she graduated the Philosophical Faculty of Charles University with an M.A. in Russian and Spanish. A year later, she obtained a doctorate from Slavic and General linguistics. Because she refused to enter the Communist party, she was forbidden to defend her dissertation for the degree of Candidate of Sciences. This was one of the reasons she opted to leave for exile. Between 1974 and 1976, she lived in Cologne, West Germany. Later she moved to the United States of America. She was condemned to year and a half in prison for leaving Czechoslovakia without permission.

Volková taught at six universities in three different countries, e.g. University of Cologne, University of Marburg, University of Virginia and Harvard University. Her home university eventually became Indiana University Bloomington, where she taught since 1982 in the Department of Slavic Languages and Literatures and for thirty years led the Czech program. She became a Full Professor in 1991.

She was the author of many academic articles and two monographs from linguistic and literary semiotics: Emotive Signs in Language (1987) and A Feminist's Semiotic Odyssey through Czech Literature (1997). Her newest work is a book of essays Forms of Exile in Jewish Literature and Thought:Twentieth-Century Central Europe and Migration to America (2021), Czech version Podoby exilu v židovské literatuře a myšlení: Střední Evropa ve dvacátém století a přesun do Ameriky (2022). Between the years 1976 and 1992, her work appeared under the name Bronislava Volek.

Volková contributed to theory and structure of emotive signs and meanings, developing differences between emotivity, expressivity, intensity and values, to Russian word-formation, pragmatics, etc. She also worked on functions of linguistic repetition in Russian and Spanish dialogue, levels of emphasis in Russian, Spanish and Czech syntax and other semiotic topics.

Apart from her linguistic analyses, she applied her semiotic theory to the work of important Czech authors (Mácha, Kundera, Němcová, Hrabal, Čapek, Havel and others). Her literary analyses focus on gender, responsibility, guilt, innocence, racism, nationalism, eurocentrism, relationship between private and public sphere, escape and vision, death and other topics. She also analyzed poetry on the basis of emotive signs and meanings, characterizing the poetics of individual authors or poems via typology and frequency of emotive signs used. Her work was reviewed in a number of countries and parts of it were translated into Czech, Russian, German and Spanish.

During her academic career, Volková taught courses and led investigations from many different fields, including general linguistics, Slavic studies, theater, comparative literature, philosophy, history, folklore, Jewish studies, communication and culture, semiotics, cognitive linguistics and literary translation.

Besides her scholarly work, Volková was also a poet. Her poetry appears in journals, anthologies, websites, as well as poetry collections. It has existential, reflective and spiritual character. Since 1999, her poetry appears in bilingual, Czech-English form. She also participated in many international anthologies of poetry and lectured at many universities around the world. Her poetry was reviewed by famous authors of various nationalities, e.g. Bohumil Hrabal, Miroslav Holub, Arnošt Lustig, W.S. Merwin, Willis Barnstone, Petr Král, Igor Hochel, Atanas Zvezdinov, Aleksandr Karpenko and many others.

Another area of Volková's work is poetry translation. She translated many poets from Czech to English, from other Slavic languages into Czech and from Spanish into Russian or Czech. She authored two books of translations of her own poetry from Czech to Russian and an extensive anthology of Czech poets in English (Po hřbetě ďábla / Up the Devil's Back).

She also authored stories and essays, especially on the theme of exile in both languages. Volková was a member of Czech and American PEN club and a recipient of various international cultural and literary awards.

Apart from literary and scholarly work, she engaged in creation of collages, which she used both as illustrations and covers of poetry books, as well as in exhibitions and multimedia shows.

Volková died on October 29, 2026, at the age of 80.

== Selected literature ==
=== Poetry ===
- Motáky do uší pěny (1984), bilingual edition Prison Notes Smuggled into the Ears of Sea Foam (1999)
- Dům v ohni (1985)
- Vzduch bez podpatků (1987)
- Jistá nepřítomnost (1990), bilingual edition A Certain Absence (2003)
- The Courage of the Rainbow (Selected Poems, 1993)
- Proměny/Transformations (2000), bilingual edition
- Zranitelnost země (1992)
- Hluchoněmá dlaň (1993)
- Roztříštěné světy (1995)
- Vstup do světla/Entering Light (2002), bilingual edition
- Ze tmy zrozená (2004), English edition Born out of Darkness (2005)
- A pít budem ze studní lahodných (2010), English edition And Drink We Will from Delectable Wells... (2011)
- Vzpomínky moře (Collected Poems, 2011)
- Az sym tvoiata sydba (Bulgarian, 2013)
- Neprinaležnisť (Ukrainian, 2014)
- Šepot vselennoj (Russian, 2015)
- Být stromem, který zpívá/Being a Tree that Sings (2016), bilingual edition
- Z druhej strany duše (Slovak, 2016)
- Viter na kolinax/Vítr na kolenou (Ukrainian-Czech bilingual edition, 2019)
- Heimkehr/Návrat (German-Czech bilingual edition, 2019)
- Lučše čem tišina zvučať… (Russian, 2020)
- Mirando las aguas (Spanish, 2020)

=== Scholarly publications ===
- Emotive Signs in Language and Semantic Functioning of Derived Nouns in Russian (1987)
- Czech Poets and Writers Reminisce and Envision (1991)
- A Feminist's Semiotic Odyssey through Czech Literature (1997)
- Up the Devil's Back/Po hřbetě ďábla: A Bilingual Anthology of 20th Century Czech Poetry (2008)
- Forms of Exile in Jewish Literature and Thought (2021)
