= Anton Kern =

German painter

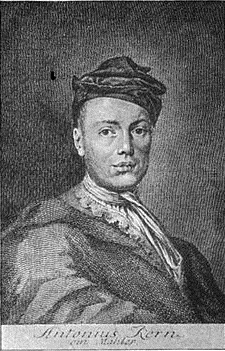
Anton Kern; portrait by Johann Balzer (1740)

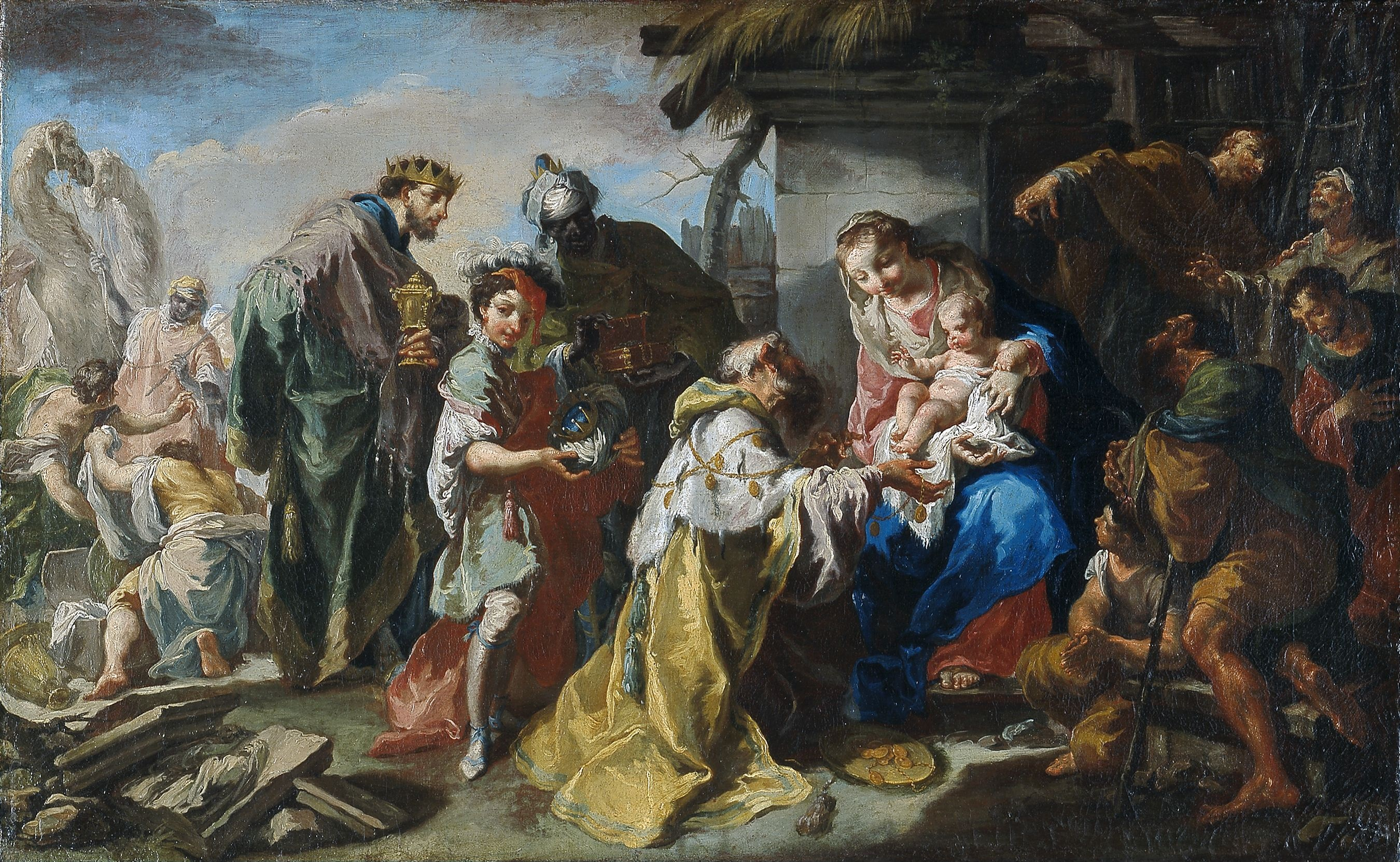
Adoration of the Magi

Anton Kern or Körne (12 December 1709 - 8 June 1747) was a Bohemian-born painter; primarily of religious and historical scenes.

== Biography ==
Kern was born in Děčín, where his father Johannes was the town clerk. He was brought by his father to Dresden, where his artistic talents first came to the attention of Laurentio di Rossi, an artist of Venetian origin who was serving as a court painter in Saxony, while Kern was attending the Jesuit school in Bohosudov. Rossi was sufficiently impressed to take him to his studio in Dresden and give him lessons.

In 1723, Rossi took him to Italy and secured him an apprenticeship with Giambattista Pittoni. He remained with Pittoni for seven years, although he also took lessons at various public and private schools. He returned to Bohemia in 1731, accompanied by Laurentio's brother, Ventura. Four years later, he was officially registered as a "Pictor" at the Faculty of Arts, Charles University in Prague.

Between 1734-1738 he worked in Prague and in the north Bohemia. His most important works of this period are: two altarpieces with Saint Apollonia and Saint Agata for Loreta Church in Prague, Saint Norbert for Strahov Monastery, Saint John at Patmos for Cistercian abbey church in Osek, Teplice District and an enthroned Virgin Mary, surrounded by St. Anthony, St. John of Nepomuk and St. Wenceslaus (National Gallery in Prague); this group of works shows the influence of Johann Christoph Lischka and Petr Brandl.

In 1738, he was summoned to Dresden, where he received several commissions related to the wedding of Princess Maria Amalia and King Charles VII of Naples (later Charles III of Spain). He made numerous sketches for altar and ceiling paintings at the court church that were never executed. That same year, Frederick Augustus II, the Elector of Saxony, presented him with a scholarship to study in Rome, where he may have worked with Francesco Trevisani. Upon his return in 1741, he was appointed a court painter. He died in Dresden.

In his last years, he turned to mythological subjects and developed stylistic elements that would later become part of the Rococo style. In 1747 he became ill, with an unknown ailment, and died the same day.

His older brother, Benedict (1704-c.1777), was also an artist and court painter in Saxony, who specialized in landscapes and restorations.
