= Cultural monument (Czech Republic) =

Protected property designation in the Czech Republic

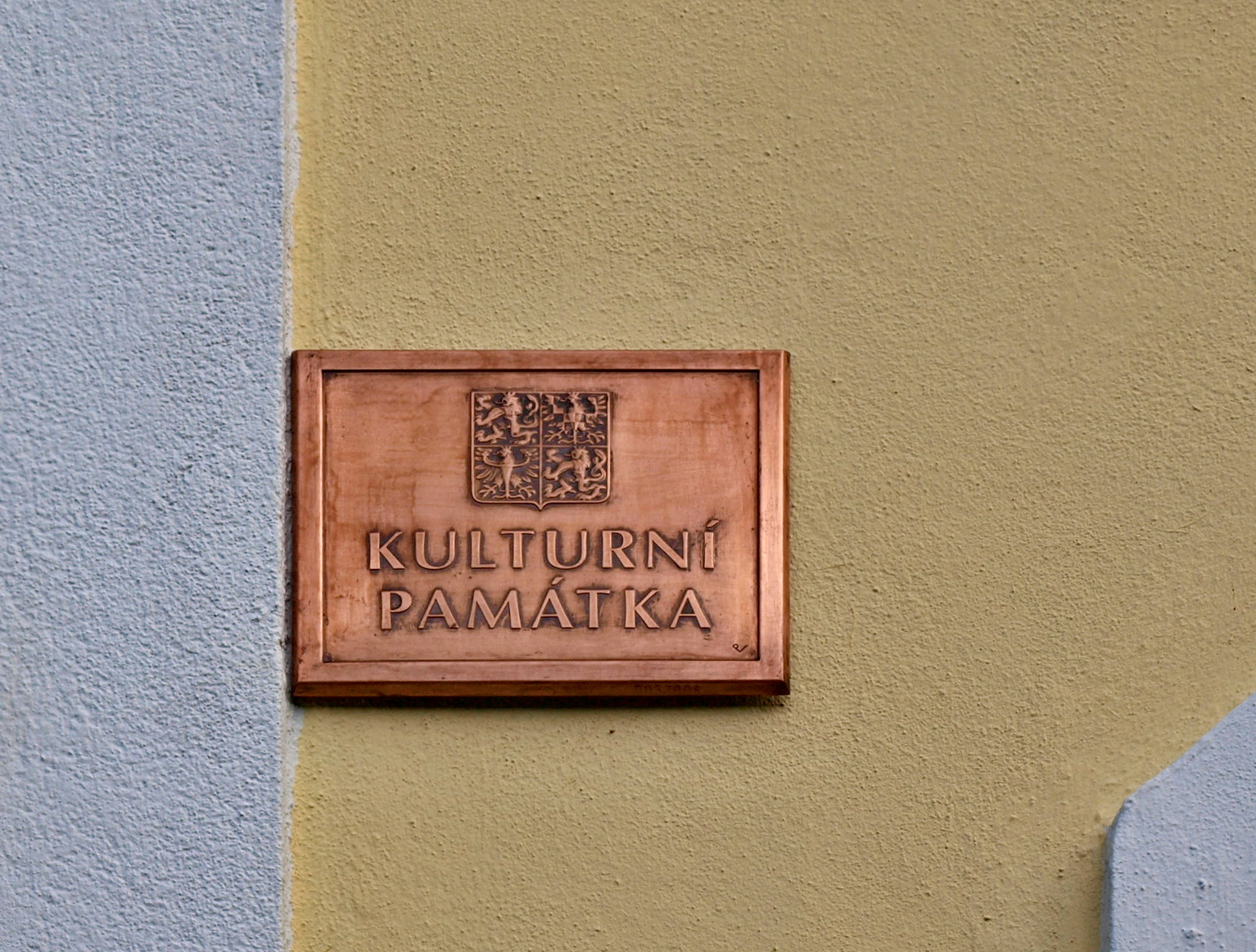
Cultural monument sign in Vrané nad Vltavou

The cultural monuments of the Czech Republic (Czech: kulturní památka) are protected properties (both real and movable properties) designated by the Ministry of Culture of the Czech Republic. Cultural monuments that constitute the most important part of the Czech cultural heritage may be declared national cultural monuments (Czech: národní kulturní památka) by a regulation of the Government of the Czech Republic. The government may also proclaim a territory, whose character and environment are determined by a group of immovable cultural monuments or archaeological finds, as a whole, as a monument reservation. The Ministry of Culture may proclaim a territory of a settlement with a smaller number of cultural monuments, a historical environment or part of a landscape area that displays significant cultural values as a monument zone.

As of 2019, there are 14 Czech cultural monuments on the World Heritage List.

== Proclaiming Objects as Cultural Monuments ==
The criteria for declaring an object a cultural monument, as well as the rules of their protection and management are defined in Act 20/1987 Coll., on State Heritage Preservation. The criteria include objects that are an "important record of historical development, way of life and environment of society from the most ancient times to the present day, as a display of creative skills and work of humankind from the various fields of human activities, for their revolutionary, historic, artistic, scientific and technical values, [or] that have a direct relation to important personalities and historic events".

== Cancellation of Proclamation of an Object as a Cultural Monument ==
Unless a national cultural monument is involved, the Ministry of Culture may, on extremely serious grounds, cancel the proclamation of an object as a cultural monument at the request of the owner or of an organization that demonstrates a legal interest in the cancelling of the cultural monument status or at its initiative.

Following the Velvet Revolution, the national cultural monument designation was removed from the commemorative sites of the workers' movement, however some of these buildings are still protected as cultural monuments.

=== 1991 ===
The protection was canceled by the Government Decree No. 112/1991 Coll . for these monuments:

- National House in Karlín, Prague
- Villa Tereza, Prague
- Workers' House in Kladno, Central Bohemian Region
- Birthplace of Antonín Zápotocký in Zákolany, Central Bohemian Region
- Restaurant in Liberec, Liberec Region
- Birthplace of Bohumír Šmeral in Třebíč, Vysočina Region
- Birthplace of Klement Gottwald in Dědice, South Moravian Region

In May 1991 the status was also removed from the Monument to Soviet Tank Crews in Prague.

=== 1992 ===
By the government decree No. 404/1992 Coll. cultural monument status was withdrawn from Tábor historical center at the request of the city authorities because the designation prevented the property restitution in the city. At same time the existing cultural monuments of the Old Town Hall (NKP no. 122) and Kotnov Castle with the Bechyně Gate (NKP no. 123) were promoted to the national cultural monuments.

=== 1995 ===
Protection was repealed by Government Decree No. 262/1995 Coll . for these monuments:

- pub U Kaštanu, Prague
- People's House, Prague
- The Workers' House "Peklo" in Plzeň, Plzeň Region
- Memorial to the Hungry March in Duchcov, Ústí nad Labem Region (transferred from the viaduct to the chateau park), Protection of the Duchcov Viaduct removed
- Rumburk Rebellion Monument "Untouched" in Rumburk, Ústí nad Labem Region
- Memorial to the victims of the Svárovská strike in Velké Hamry, Liberec Region
- Birthplace of Josef Hybeš in Dašice, Pardubice Region
- Memorial to the fallen partisans in Leškovice, Vysočina region
- Memorial of the Slavonic Brotherhood in Mnich, Vysočina Region
- Birthplace of Ludvík Svoboda in Hroznatín, Vysočina Region
- Memorial to the victims of the Frývaldov strike in Lipová lázně, Olomouc region
- Monument to the Ostrava Operation in Hrabyně, Moravian-Silesian Region

== Administration ==
The Ministry of Culture is the central body of the state administration for cultural monuments.

The National Heritage Institute (Czech: NPÚ) is the biggest state-funded organisation under the Culture Ministry of the Czech Republic. Under the current laws, it is entrusted with several expert tasks related to the state heritage conservation. The institute manages all the state-owned monuments. As of 2019, there are over a hundred castles, chateaux and other monuments under the NPÚ management. It also maintains the Central List of Cultural Monuments of the Czech Republic and the Tentative List of cultural monuments which the Czech Republic intends to consider for nomination for the World Heritage List. The institute is also required to provide free advice on the conservation, maintenance and renovation of the monuments, and provide expert supervision during their restoration and renovation.

The Ministry has also established a monument inspectorate as its specialized supervisory body in the area of state monument care. The main mission of the monument inspectorate is to exercise central supervision over compliance with this Act 20/1987 and with regulations issued for its implementation.

Each municipality manages cultural monuments within its territory. Municipalities with extended powers then carry out delegated state administration in the area of monument preservation, especially state building supervision during the monument restoration; they oversee compliance with the law.

== Central List ==
The central List of Cultural Monuments of the Czech Republic contains both immovable and movable objects. One index number identifies both a single item (for example a building, a painting) or a set of buildings or items (for example castle grounds, chateau furniture). Thus, the number of cultural monuments on the list (currently almost 89,000 entries) does not reflect the actual count of the protected objects - in reality, there are more than two million individual pieces, many of them recorded under the same index number.

There are almost 40 thousand immovable objects like historical buildings, archaeological sites, industrial monuments, and folk architecture.

The movable objects include works of art, valuable handicrafts, historical library collections and original furnishings of castles and chateaux and sacral buildings. There are hundreds of thousands of such items, and almost 49 thousand items are protected as cultural monuments. Unlike the immovable monuments data on movable monuments are not publicly accessible due to theft and personal data protection.

== Monument reservations ==
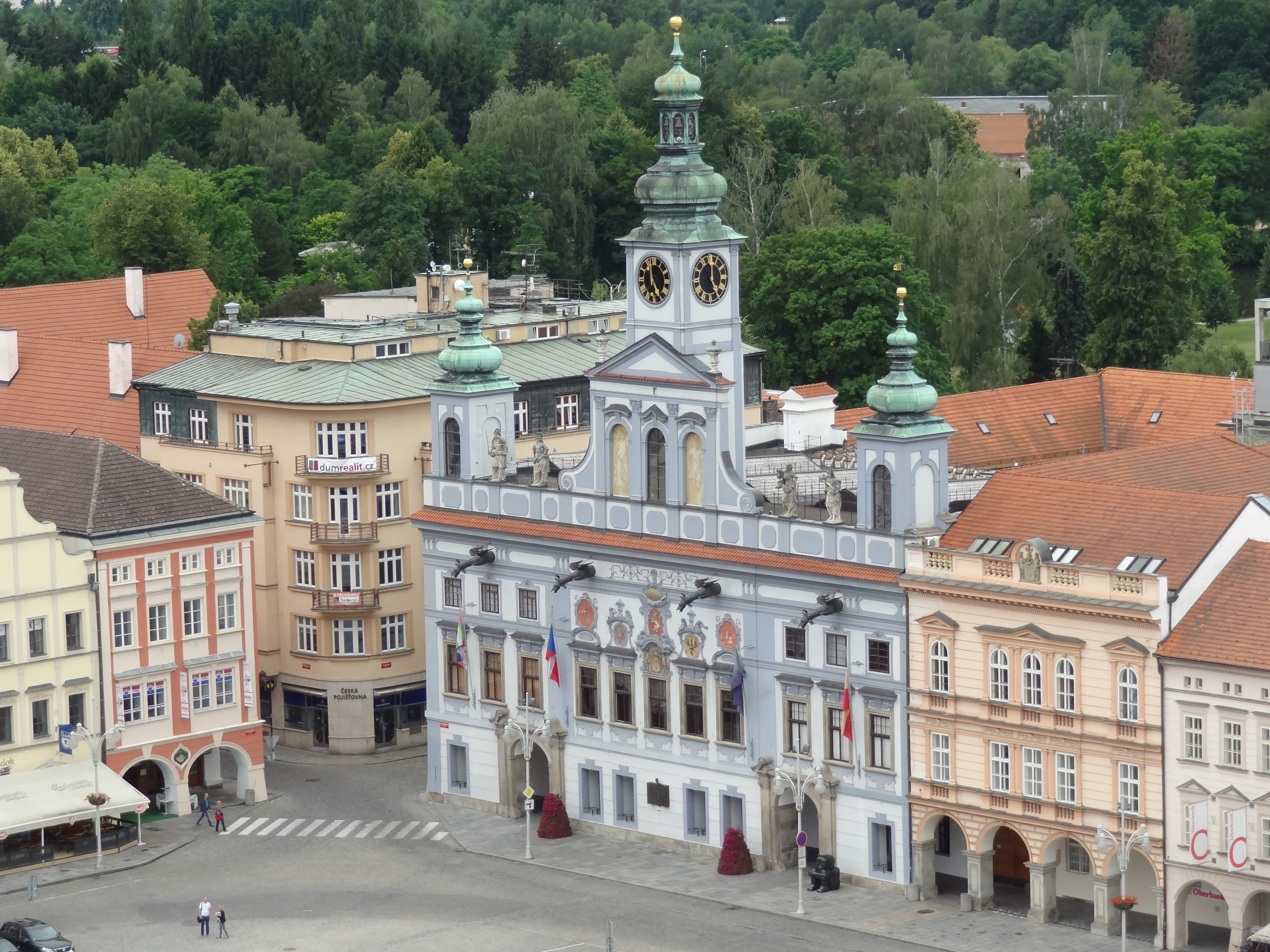
Urban monument reservation České Budějovice - city hall

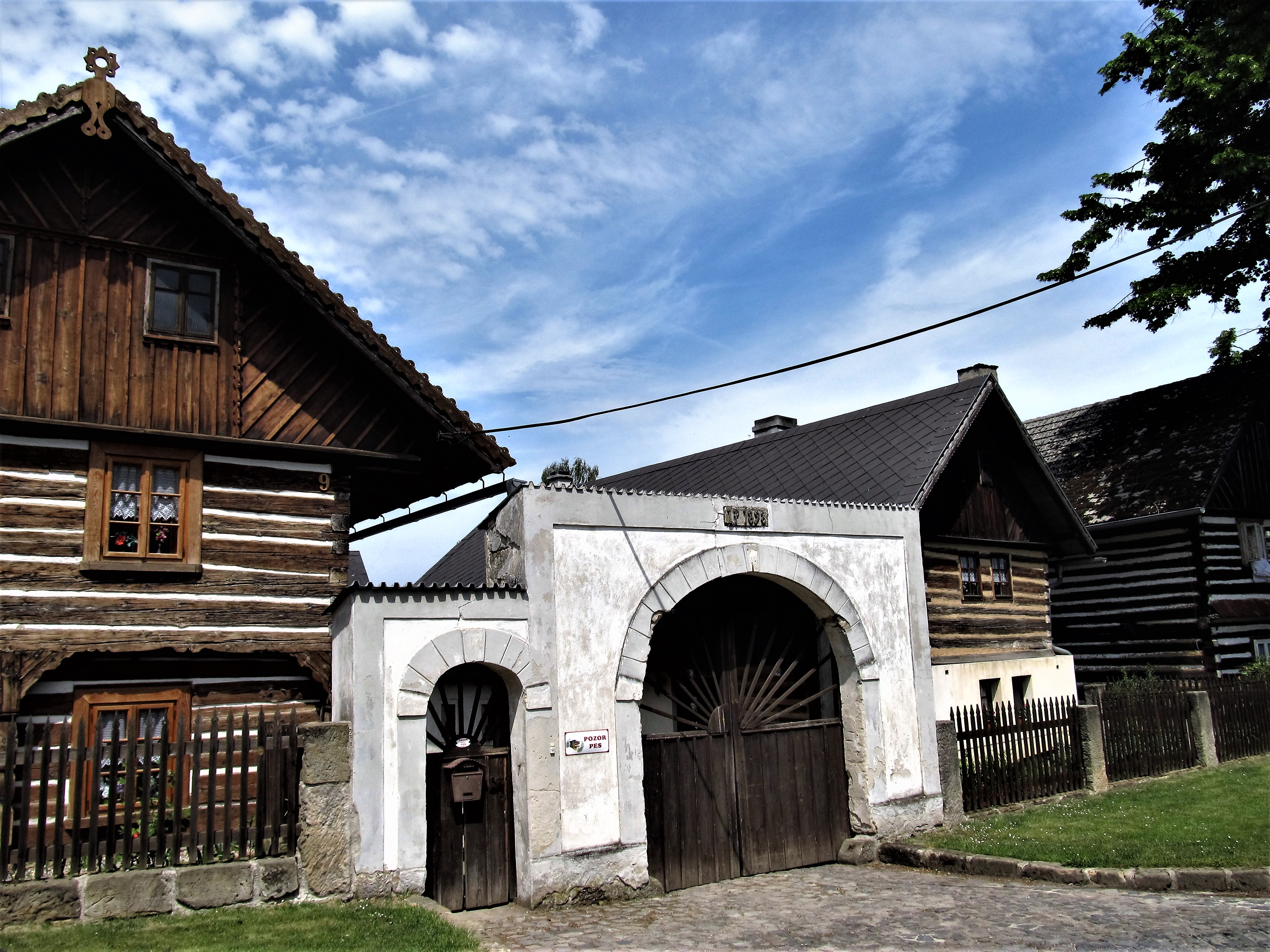
Village monument reservation Nosálov (okres Mělník)

Areas with sets of immovable cultural monuments preserved in the original historical environment or sites with archaeological finds can be declared as conservation areas. These are mainly the historical town or village centers. The Government of the Czech Republic defines them by government decree. In the Czech Republic, there are urban, village and archaeological monument reservations.

- The urban monument reservation is a selected part of the historic city center with preserved buildings (or their ensembles) and urban infrastructure (fountains, sculptures, etc.) without significant intrusive constructional interventions from the modern era. The designation protects not only the individual buildings but also the historical floor plan, the urban structure, the panorama, etc. In 2013 there were a total of 40 cities that were declared as an urban monument reservation. The largest among them is the Prague Monument reservation, followed by the Brno and the Olomouc reservations. The monument reservations are proclaimed by the government.
- The village monument reservation is an area with preserved buildings of a folk character, e.g. villages, workers' colonies or suburban districts with folk architecture. The most valued feature of such areas is the preserved (or only minimally disturbed) urban structure. There have been 61 village conservation areas established in the Czech Republic and their character differs by region.
- The archaeological monument reservation preserves the archaeological sites. As of 2019, there are eight such sites in the Czech Republic, all but one of which are hill-forts.

== Monument zones ==
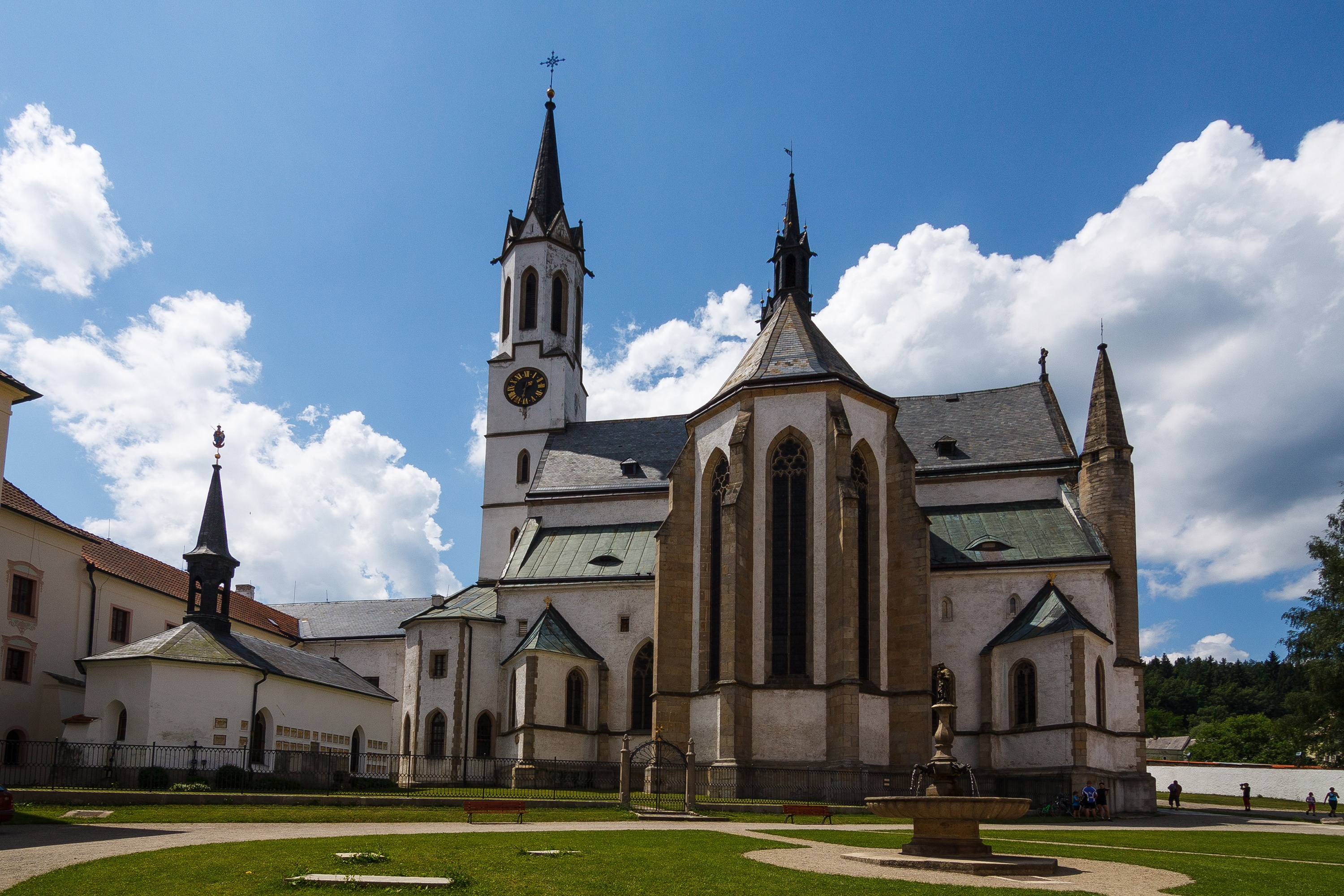
Cloister Vyšší brod - part of the urban monument zone Vyšší Brod.

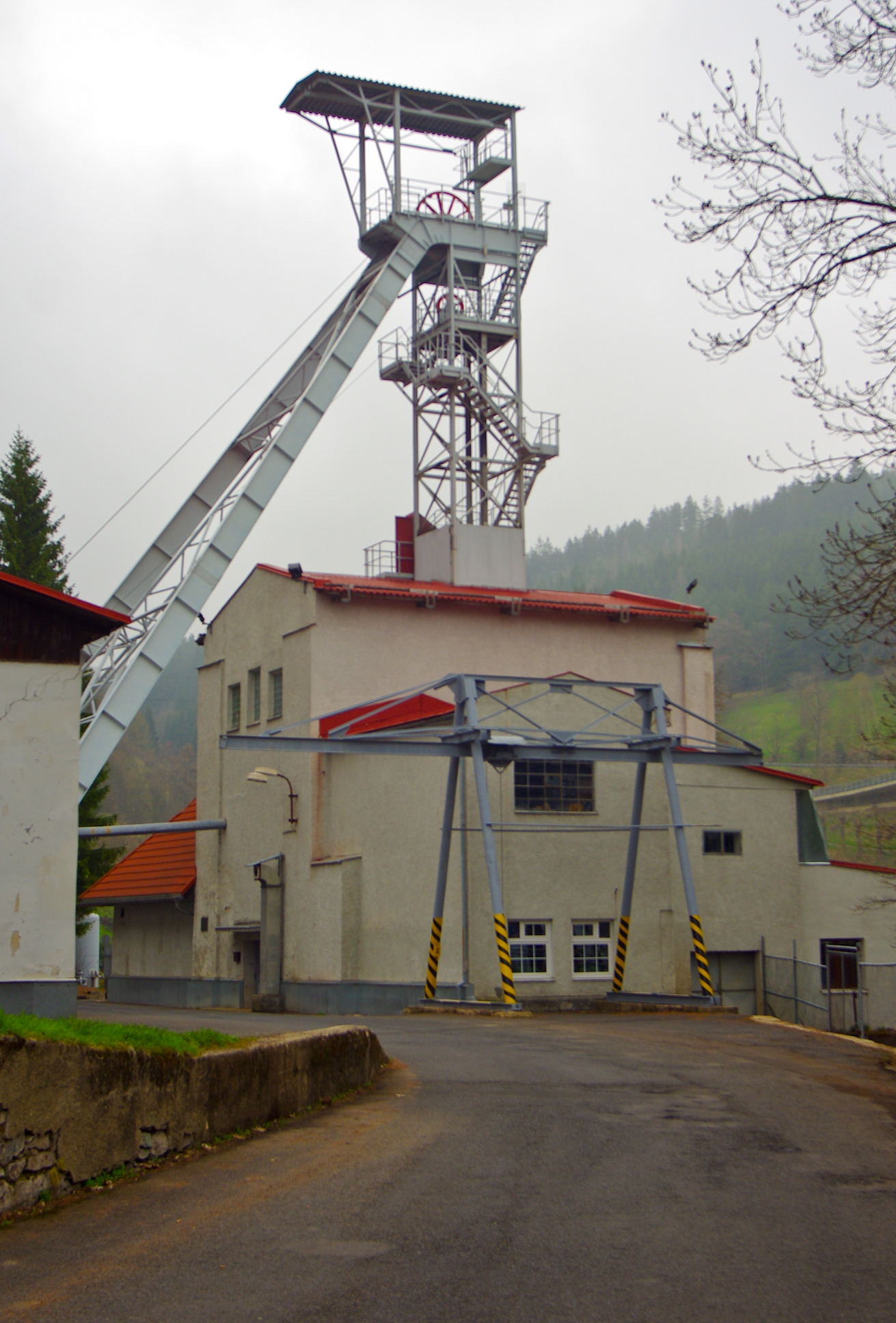
Village monument zone Jáchymov - shaft Svornost.

A monument zone can be a city, part of a city, or a part of a landscape unit that has significant cultural value. The Czech Republic has urban, village, and landscape monument zones. All are proclaimed by the Ministry of Culture.

=== Urban monument zone ===
An urban monument zone is a part of a city or town that is historically significant. It is declared by the Ministry of Culture of the Czech Republic. Most urban monument zones are of medieval origin, but some urban formations are from other historical eras. Among the historical zones are examples of the Renaissance upper towns (Horní Blatná, Jiřetín pod Jedlovou), Baroque and Classicist towns (Nový Bor, Jablonec nad Nisou), spa towns (Karlovy Vary, Mariánské Lázně, Luhačovice) or urban areas connected with industrial production (Vítkovice and Přívoz in Ostrava) or rental apartments construction (Prague districts Karlín, Vinohrady, Vršovice, Žižkov, Nusle, Bubeneč, Smíchov and Dejvice). Modern urban and residential districts dated from the 20th century (Plzeň Lochotín and Plzeň Bezovka, Prague's Ořechovka and Baba), or workers' colonies (Brumov) are among the urban monument zone. Even the era of the so-called socialist realism is included (Poruba neighborhood in Ostrava).

=== Village monument zone ===
A village monument zone has a lower concentration of cultural monuments than a village monument reservation but exhibits significant cultural value as a historical environment or part of the landscape. A total of 211 village monument zones are declared in the Czech Republic as of 2011.

=== Landscape monument zone ===
A landscape monument zone is an area protected primarily for the cultural value of the landscape. This means that such areas do not necessarily have to be of exceptional natural or ecological quality, although in most cases the protection of cultural and natural heritage is intertwined and complementary. The pool of the landscape monuments is very diverse – they can be architecturally composed landscapes with roads and alleys and related buildings (Novohradsko, Chudenicko, Lednice-Valtice area), or important pilgrimage sites (Římovsko, Libějovicko-Lomecko), areas with the remains of mining activities (Jáchymov, Krupka) or memorial lands, reminiscent of major battles (battlefield near Hradec Králové), near Slavkov or Chlumec).

== Funding ==
The owner of a cultural monument needs to care for its conservation, to keep it in good condition and to protect it at his/her own expense. The owner is entitled to free professional advice when providing care for the monument.

Since repairing a monument usually requires a specific approach like the use of traditional materials and technologies which may prove costly, the owner has an option to apply for various grants offered by some institutions in the Czech Republic, namely by the Ministry of Culture, or for funding available through the European Structural Funds. Financial support is also offered directly by some regional authorities, however the programs differ from region to region.

=== Funding Programs ===
The Ministry of Culture contributes to the restoration of a cultural monument from the state budget if there is an extraordinary social interest in preserving the cultural monument (for example, if the monument is one of its kind, or if the monument is in a state of disrepair not caused by its owner or if the monument is included in one of the specialized contribution programs offered by the Ministry of Culture). The grant recipients can be individuals, municipalities and legal entities established by them, churches, nonprofit organizations, legal entities and regions. Every year the Ministry publishes an evaluation report for six of the programs listed below. The report shows the total CZK amount allocated to the 14 regions of the Czech Republic broken up by the recipient type and the monument type.

==== Architectural Heritage Conservation Program ====
The program provides contributions to the restoration of the most valuable pieces of the architectural heritage (for example, castles, chateaux, monasteries, historical gardens and churches). In 2018 the Church received the bulk of the contributions.

==== Emergency program ====
The program provides contributions to ensure the most urgent repairs of the immovable cultural monuments. In 2018 the Church received the bulk of the contributions.

==== Program of regeneration of urban conservation areas and zones ====
This program provides contributions to the restoration of cultural monuments located in the most valuable parts of historic cities declared as conservation areas or zones. In 2018 municipalities received the bulk of the contributions.

==== Program of care for village conservation areas and zones and for landscape conservation zones ====
This program provides contributions to the restoration of cultural monuments located in rural monument reserves and in rural and landscape conservation zones (for example the folk architecture monuments). In 2018 individuals received the bulk of the contributions.

==== Program of restoration of movable cultural monuments ====
This program provides contributions to the restoration of movable cultural monuments, in particular important works of fine art or handicrafts placed in buildings open to the public for cultural, educational or religious purposes (e.g. paintings and sculptures in churches). In 2018 the Church received the bulk of the contributions.

==== Support for the restoration of cultural monuments through municipalities with extended powers ====
It was founded in 2008 to allow funding where other programs of the Ministry of Culture do not apply. The funds in the Program are intended for the preservation and restoration of immovable cultural monuments that are located outside the historical reserves and zones, are not national cultural monuments and are not owned by the Czech Republic. In 2018 the Church received the bulk of the contributions.

==== UNESCO Monuments Support Program ====
The UNESCO Support Program was created in 2008. Its main objective is to meet the Czech Republic's obligations arising from the adoption of the Convention on the Protection of the Underwater Cultural Heritage. The purpose of the program is to support the upkeep of the Czech monuments registered on the World Heritage List.

==== Cultural activities in monument conservation Program ====
It allows financial support of publicly beneficial projects submitted by associations, whose activities help to protect the immovable and movable heritage fund in the Czech Republic and who contribute to the popularization of its care.

== Classification ==
There are many different ways how to classify the monuments. Two of the most common are the classification by type according to Jaroslav Herout and the one listed in the Czech Tourism Atlas.

=== Classification by J.Herout ===
- Archaeological monuments
- Castles, fortresses and chateaux
- Churches and cloisters
- City fortifications and forts
- City architecture, buildings
- Statues, sculptural groups, fountains, and small stone work
- Historical and cultural historical monuments and military monuments
- Folk architecture
- Technical architecture
- Historical gardens and parks

=== Classification by Czech Tourism Atlas ===
- Architectural monuments (museum building, theater, villa, city hall, town square, fountain)
- Church monuments (chapel, church, cathedral, cloister, synagogue, burial site, cemetery)
- Hill-fort (and settlement)
- Castles and chateaux (and ruins)
- Technical monuments (bridge, buttress, railroad, fort, military cemetery)
- Folk architecture
- Military architecture

== See also ==
- List of national cultural monuments of the Czech Republic (in Czech)
- List of urban monument reservations in the Czech Republic (in Czech)
- List of urban monument zones in the Czech Republic (in Czech)
- List of village monument zones in the Czech Republic (in Czech)
- List of landscape monument zones in the Czech Republic (in Czech)
