= Ladislav Zápotocký =

Czech politician, journalist, translator and labor leader

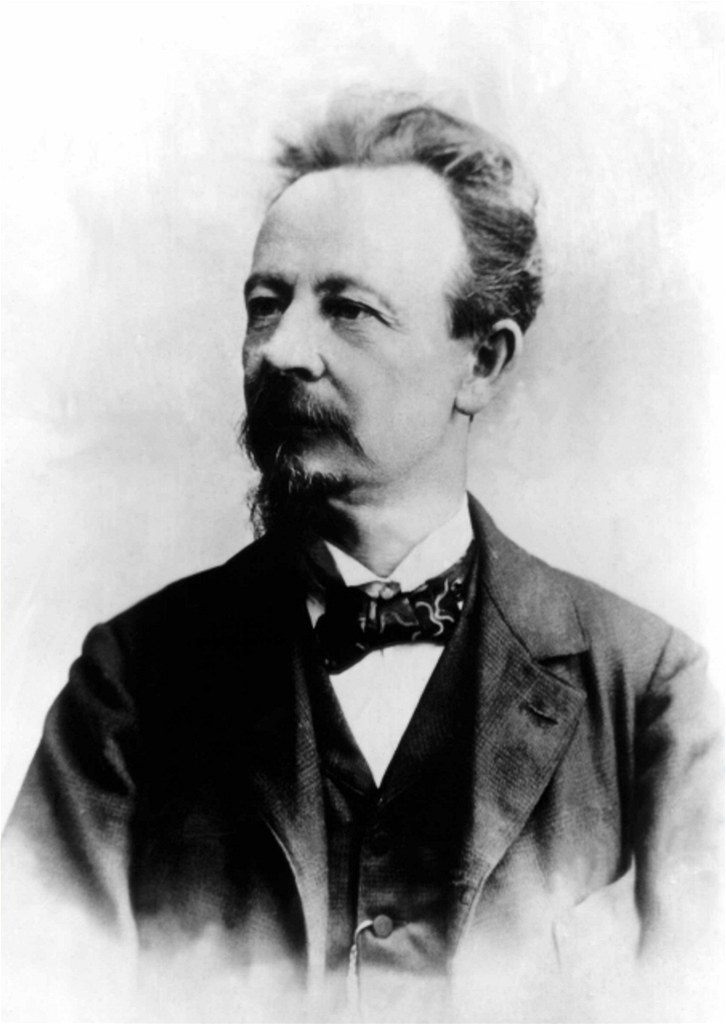
- Born: 12 January 1852; Prague, Austrian Empire
- Died: 16 November 1916 (aged 64); Prague, Austria-Hungary
- Resting place: Olšany Cemetery
- Occupations: Journalist, translator, publicist, tailor
- Children: Antonín Zápotocký

Ladislav Zápotocký (also known under the pseudonyms Budečský and Mikuláš Haštalský; 12 January 1852 – 16 December 1916) was a Czech politician, journalist, translator and labor leader, a pioneer of socialism and Marxism in Czechoslovakia and co-founder of the Czech Social Democratic Party. He was the father of the future Communist president and prime minister Antonín Zápotocký.

== Biography ==
Born in to the family of tailor, his father died at a young age. After graduating from primary school, he worked as a tailor and became involved in the workers' movement at the age of twenty-one.

Zápotocký founded the socialist newspaper Dělnické listy and then the Budoucnost. On 28 September 1876, Zápotocký participated in the founding of the Czech provincial organization of the Social Democratic Party of Austria and was elected to its leadership. In 1877, he founded the "Workers' Educational Discussion Association" which was dissolved as a result of Zápotocký's speeches promoting atheism.

On 7 April 1878, the so-called Břevnov Congress took place in the U Kaštanu inn in Břevnov (now Prague). The Czechoslovak Social Democratic Party in Austria was established at the congress, Josef Boleslav Pecka and Ladislav Zápotocký were the main leaders of fhe congress. This created a special organization of the Czech Social Democrats within the Social Democratic Party of Austria.

Shortly afterwards, a police investigation into the secret association was launched. Zápotocký was sentenced to two months in prison. In 1882, he was again convicted and imprisoned for his political activities, this time for a year and a half. After serving his sentence in January 1884, he was deported to his home village of Zákolany in Kladno. Here he returned to his original profession of tailor for sixteen years.

After returning to Prague, Zápotocký was employed in the trade union periodical Railway Establishment. He quit the newspaper in 1906, when he suffered a stroke. However, he still contributed to the social democratic press.

Ladislav Zápotocký died from pneumonia on 16 December 1916, and was buried at the Olšany Cemetery.

He translated for the first time some of the works of Karl Marx and Friedrich Engels in the Czech language.
