= Antonín Zápotocký =

Czech communist politician and statesman

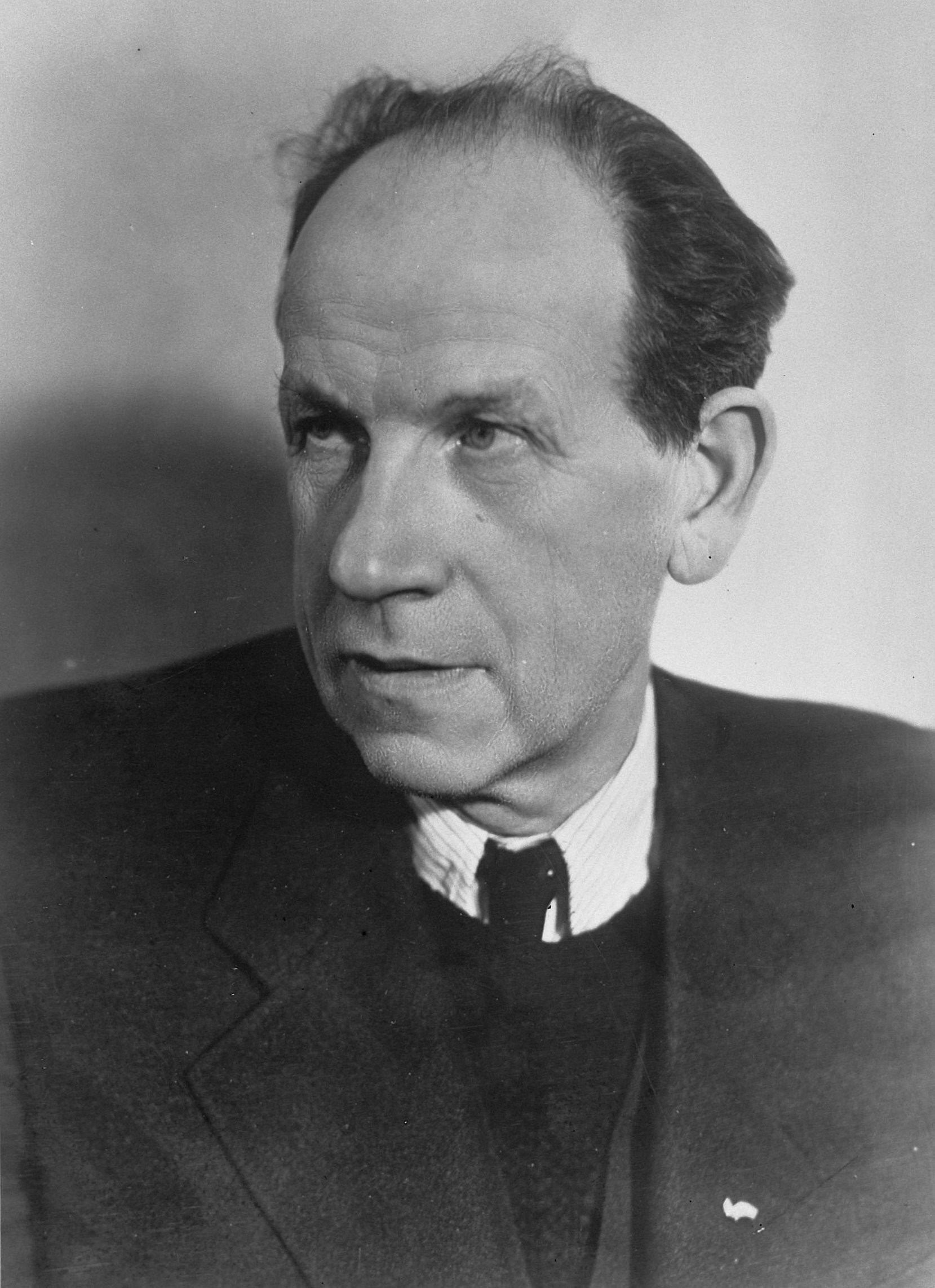
- Antonín Zápotocký in 1948

President of Czechoslovakia
- In office 21 March 1953 – 13 November 1957
- Prime Minister: Viliam Široký
- Preceded by: Klement Gottwald
- Succeeded by: Antonín Novotný

Prime Minister of Czechoslovakia
- In office 15 June 1948 – 14 March 1953
- President: Klement Gottwald
- Preceded by: Klement Gottwald
- Succeeded by: Viliam Široký

Personal details
- Born: 19 December 1884 Zákolany, Bohemia, Cisleithania, Austria-Hungary
- Died: 13 November 1957 (aged 72) Prague, Czechoslovakia
- Party: Communist Party of Czechoslovakia
- Other political affiliations: Czechoslovak Social Democratic Workers' Party
- Spouse: Marie Zápotocká
- Parent: Ladislav Zápotocký
- Occupation: Politician, writer
- Profession: Stonemason

Antonín Zápotocký (Czech pronunciation: [ˈantoɲiːn ˈzaːpototskiː]; 19 December 1884 – 13 November 1957) was a Czech communist politician and statesman in Czechoslovakia. He served as the Prime Minister of Czechoslovakia from 1948 to 1953, and then as President of Czechoslovakia from 1953 to 1957.

== Biography ==
Zápotocký was born in Zákolany, Kingdom of Bohemia, Cisleithania (then in Austria-Hungary, now in the Czech Republic). His father was Ladislav Zápotocký, one of the founders of the Czech Social Democratic Party (ČSSD), together with Josef Boleslav Pecka-Strahovský and Josef Hybeš. Antonín Zápotocký was himself active in the ČSSD from an early age as a party functionary in the Kladno district, and as an editor of the party press. During World War I, he served as a soldier in the Austro-Hungarian Army.

Following the end of the war and the establishment of Czechoslovakia in 1918, Zápotocký emerged as one of the leaders of the left wing of the ČSSD. He was a delegate of the party's left wing to the Second World Congress of the Comintern, which was held in Petrograd between 19 July and 7 August 1920. Together with Bohumír Šmeral, he co-founded the Communist Party of Czechoslovakia (KSČ) after the party left broke away from the ČSSD in 1921. He was General Secretary of the KSČ from 1922 to 1925. During the 1930s, Zápotocký focused on trade union work; in 1932, he was among the organizers of a widespread strike in the Most area. Towards the later half of the 1930s, Zápotocký worked to unite the Czechoslovak trade unions on an anti-fascist platform.

After the activities of the KSČ were suppressed under the terms of the Munich Agreement in 1938 and the majority of the party leadership started operating clandestinely, Zápotocký and Jaromír Dolanský represented its official leadership until it was officially banned in December of that year. After the occupation of the Czech lands by Nazi Germany the following year, Zápotocký was arrested in April while illegally trying to cross the border into Poland. After being held in Pankrác Prison in Prague, Zápotocký was then imprisoned in Dresden before being sent to Sachsenhausen concentration camp in 1940.

After the liberation of Sachsenhausen and the end of World War II in 1945, Zápotocký returned to Czechoslovakia, where he was appointed chairman of the Central Council of Trade Unions and a member of the presidium of the Central Committee of the KSČ. He was elected to the Interim National Assembly in the same year, and went on to serve as Chairman of the succeeding Constituent National Assembly from 18 June to 18 July 1946.

Zápotocký replaced Klement Gottwald as prime minister on 15 June 1948, when the latter became president. On 14 March 1953, shortly after returning from Soviet leader Joseph Stalin's funeral in Moscow, Gottwald died. As per the Ninth-of-May Constitution, Zápotocký took over most presidential duties, and was formally elected president in his own right a week later.

Zápotocký favoured a more humane way of governing, but was outflanked by the Stalinist First Secretary Antonín Novotný. In May 1953, in the wake of a monetary reform which effectively deprived the farmers and better-paid workers of all their savings, sporadic riots against the communist authorities took place. This occasion gave Novotný a chance to seize the upper hand. At a meeting in Moscow, Zápotocký was told to adhere to "collective leadership" — in effect, give up power to Novotný.

Zápotocký stayed in office until his death in Prague in 1957, making him the second Czechoslovak President to die in office. His body was cremated at Strašnice Crematorium and interred.

Zápotocký wrote several novels, based on the history of the labour movement in Czechoslovakia. Two of these were made into films: Red Glow Over Kladno (Rudá záře nad Kladnem) and New Warriors Will Rise (Vstanou noví bojovníci).

== Honours and awards ==
=== Czechoslovak honours ===
- Czechoslovak War Cross 1939 (1947)
- Order of Klement Gottwald, three times (21 March 1953; 19 December 1954; 7 May 1955)
- Order of the White Lion, 1st Class (21 March 1953)
- Military Order of the White Lion, 1st Class (1953)

=== Foreign honours ===
- (Bulgaria) Order of 9 September 1944, 1st Class (1948)
- (North Korea) Order of the National Flag, 1st Class (1955)
- Grand Cross of the Royal Order of Cambodia (1956)
- (Romania) Order of the Star of the Romanian People's Republic, 1st Class (1956)
- (East Germany) Order of Karl Marx (1957)
- (China) Order of Liberation, 1st Class (1957)

== Gallery ==
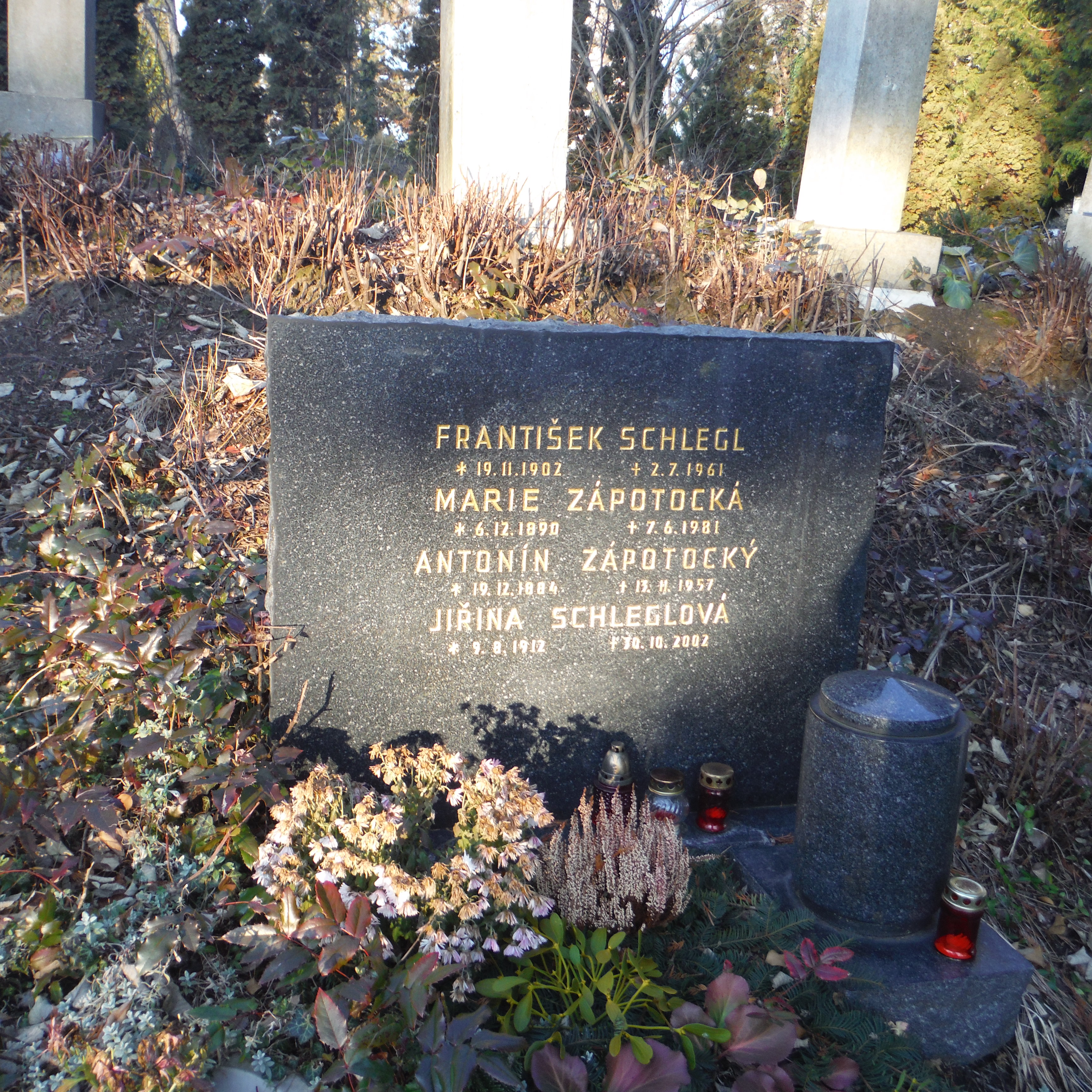
Grave of Antonín Zápotocký

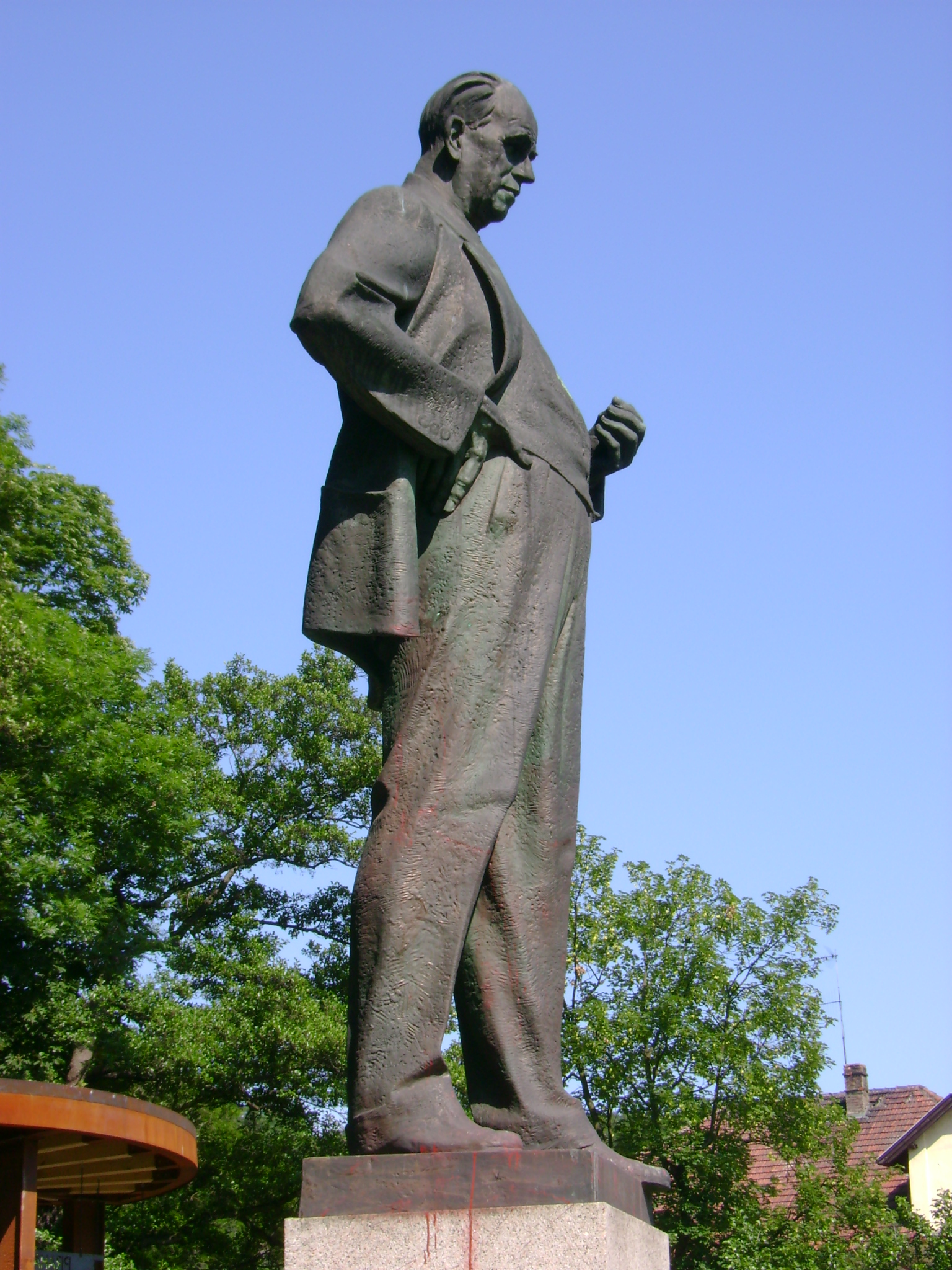
Statue of Antonín Zápotocký in his birthtown Zákolany

Political offices
| Preceded by Klement Gottwald | Prime Minister of Czechoslovakia; 1948–1953 | Succeeded by Viliam Široký |
| Preceded by Klement Gottwald | President of Czechoslovakia; 1953–1957 | Succeeded by Antonín Novotný |
