= Dašice =

- Town
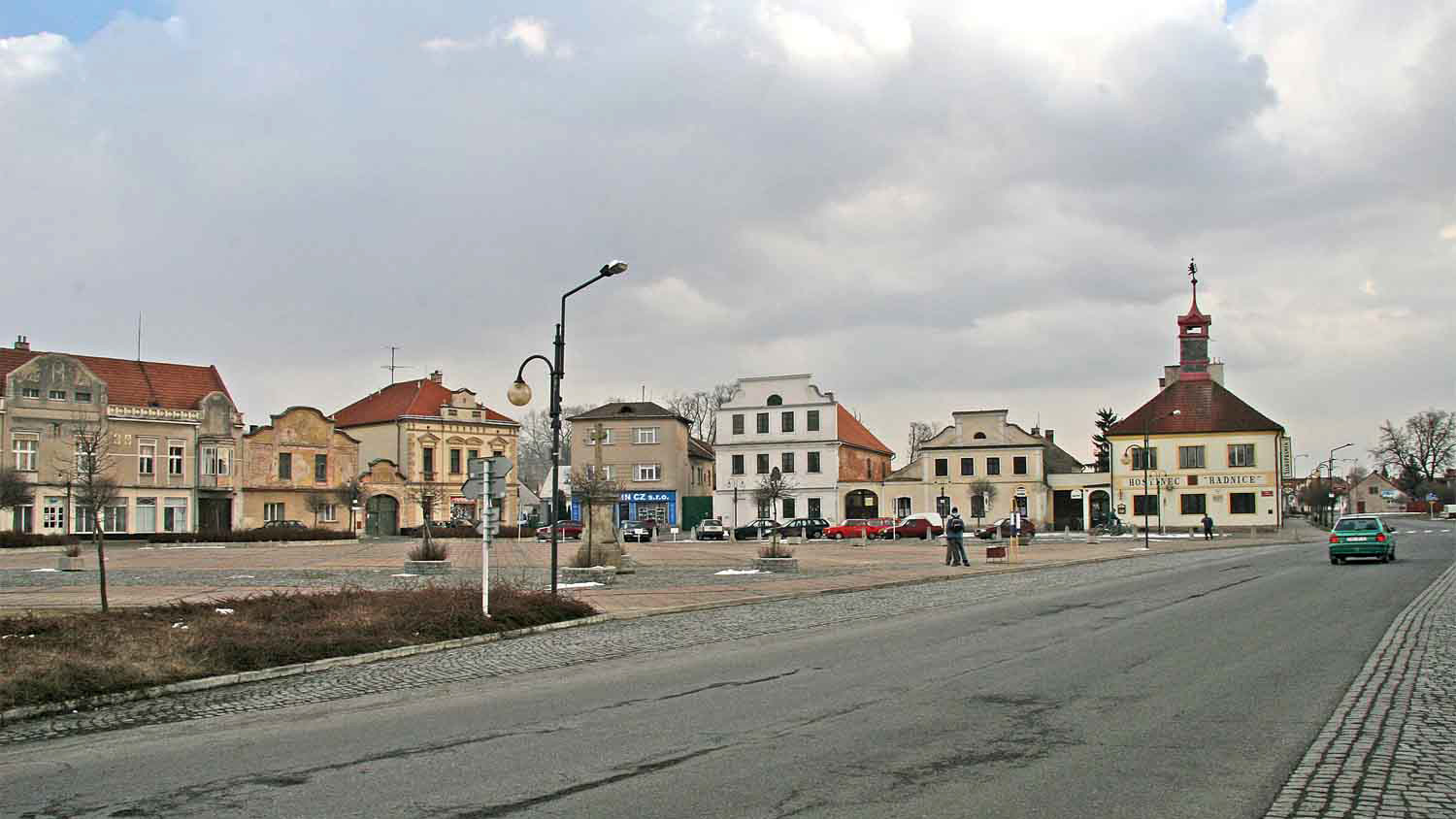
- Town square

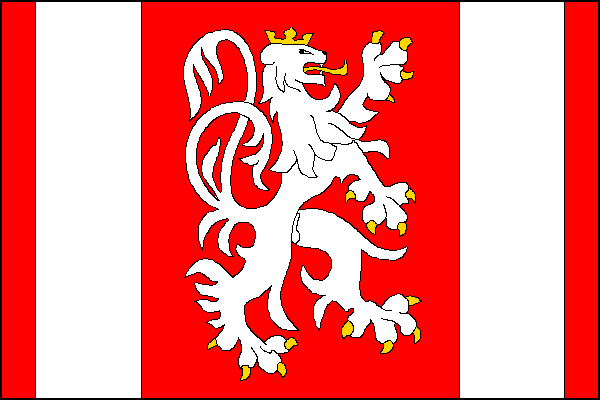
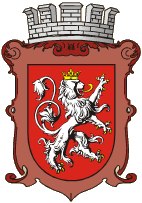
- Flag Coat of arms

- Location in the Czech Republic
- Coordinates: 50°1′48″N 15°54′47″E
- Country: Czech Republic
- Region: Pardubice
- District: Pardubice
- First mentioned: 1318

Government
  - Mayor: Pavla Žídková

Area
  - Total: 17.73 km^{2} (6.85 sq mi)
- Elevation: 227 m (745 ft)

Population (2026-01-01)
  - Total: 2,773
  - Density: 156.4/km^{2} (405.1/sq mi)
- Time zone: UTC+1 (CET)
  - Summer (DST): UTC+2 (CEST)
- Postal codes: 530 02, 533 03
- Website: www.dasice.cz

Dašice (Czech pronunciation: [ˈdaʃɪtsɛ]) is a town in Pardubice District in the Pardubice Region of the Czech Republic. It has about 2,800 inhabitants. The historic town centre is well preserved and is protected as an urban monument zone.

== Administrative division ==
Dašice consists of six municipal parts (in brackets population according to the 2021 census):

- Dašice (1,698)
- Malolánské (25)
- Pod Dubem (173)
- Prachovice (95)
- Velkolánské (42)
- Zminný (178)

== Etymology ==
The name is derived from the personal name Daš, meaning "the village of Daš's people".

== Geography ==
Dašice is located about 8 kilometres (5 mi) east of Pardubice. It lies in a flat landscape in the East Elbe Table, on the edge of the Polabí region. The Loučná River flows through the town.

== History ==
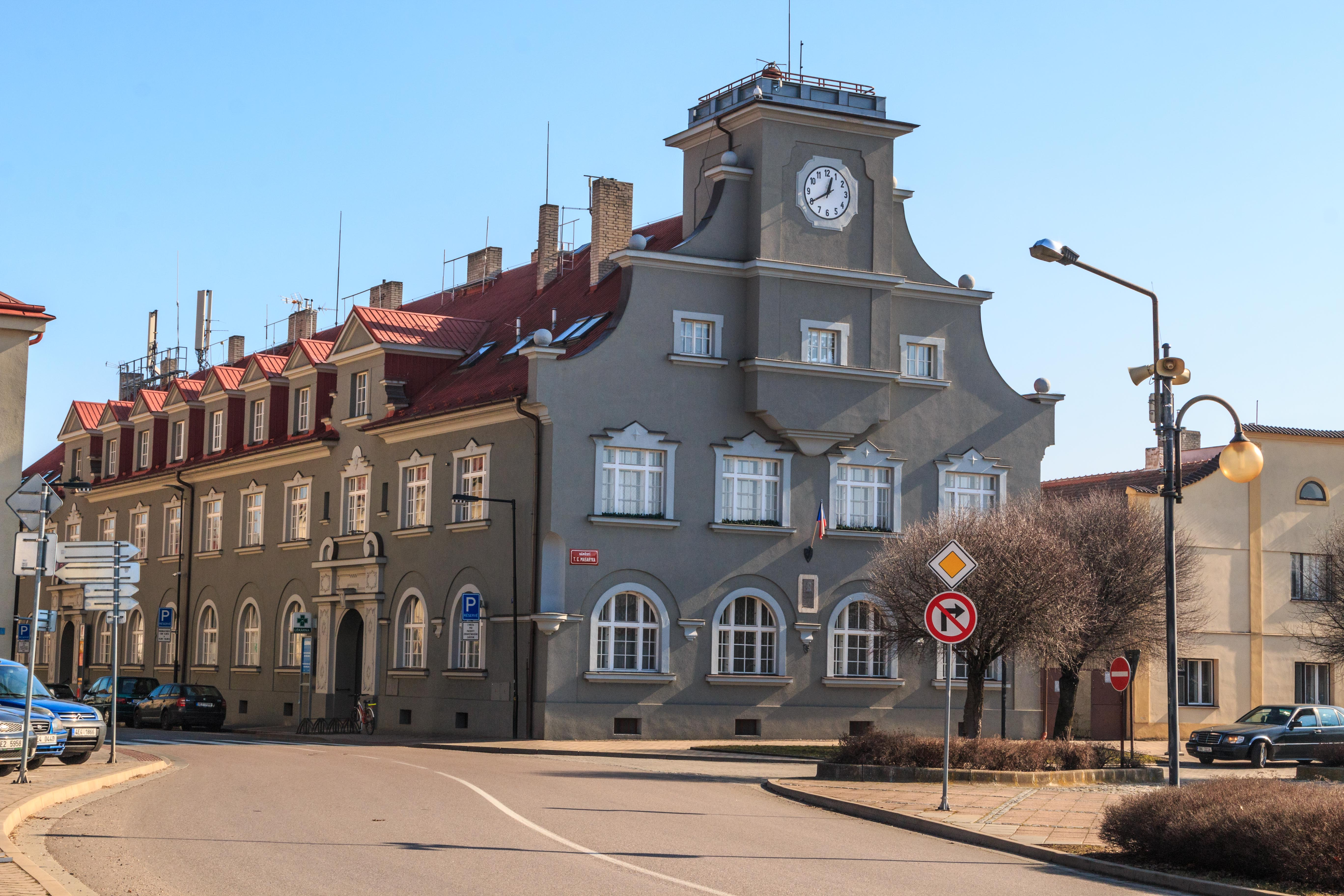
Town hall

The first written mention of Dašice is from 1318. In 1437, Dašice was first referred to as a market town. In 1517, Dašice estate was acquired by the Pernštejn family and was annexed to the Pardubice estate. In 1917, Dašice was promoted to a town.

== Demographics ==
Historical population

Year	Pop.	±%
1869	2,316	—
1880	2,630	+13.6%
1890	2,620	−0.4%
1900	2,635	+0.6%
1910	2,696	+2.3%

Year	Pop.	±%
1921	2,571	−4.6%
1930	2,817	+9.6%
1950	2,277	−19.2%
1961	2,156	−5.3%
1970	1,961	−9.0%

Year	Pop.	±%
1980	1,872	−4.5%
1991	1,764	−5.8%
2001	1,750	−0.8%
2011	2,285	+30.6%
2021	2,211	−3.2%

Source: Censuses

== Transport ==
The D35 motorway (part of the European route E442), which connects the D11 motorway with Olomouc, runs northeast of the town.

== Sights ==
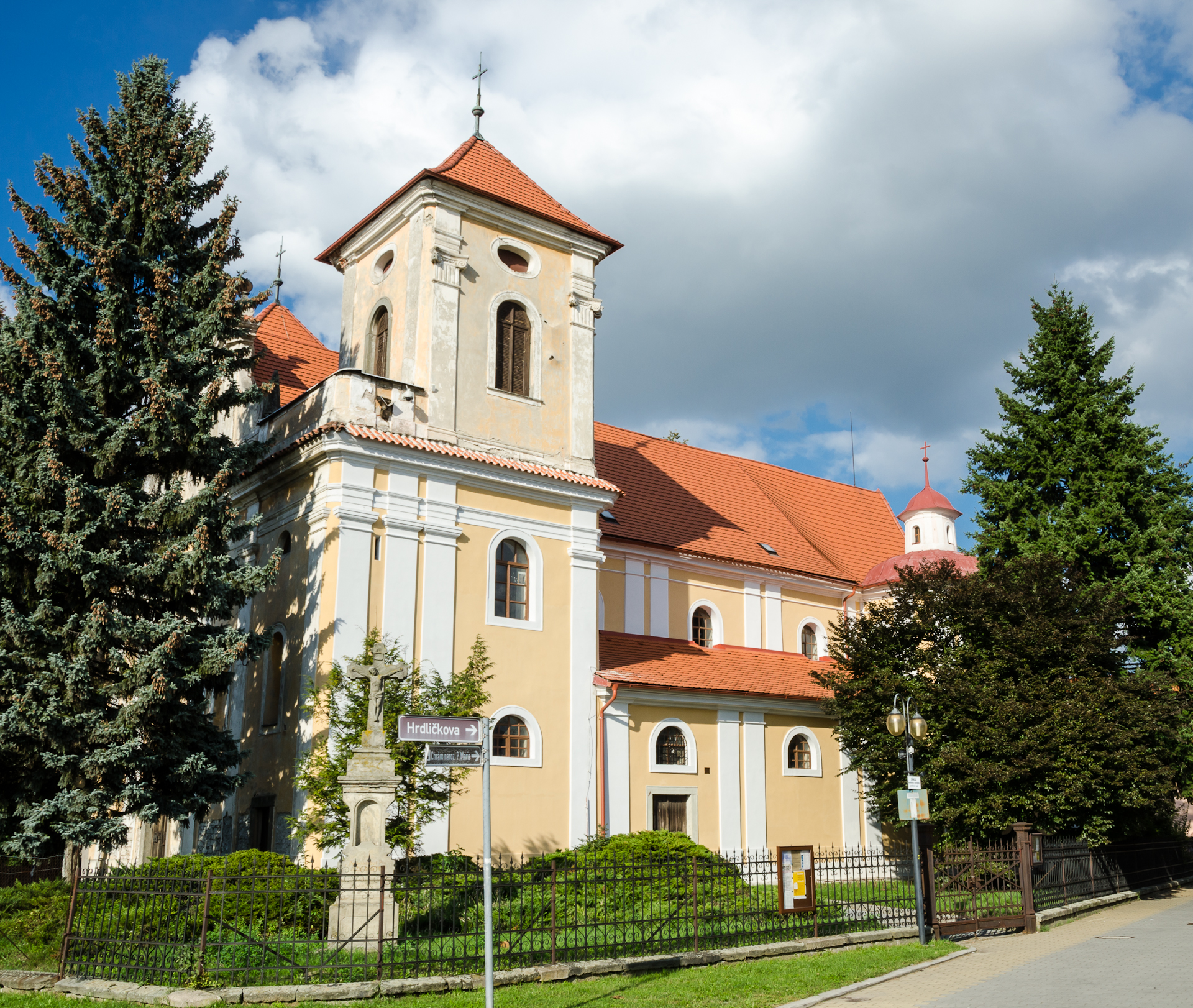
Church of the Nativity of the Virgin Mary

The historic centre is formed by the large square Náměstí T. G. Masaryka with preserved burgher houses from the turn of the 18th and 19th centuries, characterised by late Rococo Empire façades.

One of the main landmarks is the Church of the Nativity of the Virgin Mary. It is a Baroque basilica built in 1677–1707.

A historical and technical monument is the Neo-Renaissance building of the local water mill, in which two Francis turbines have been working non-stop since 1922.

== Notable people ==
- Josef Hybeš (1850–1921), labour leader, politician and journalist
