= Budeč (gord) =

Coordinates: 50°11′28″N 14°14′39″E

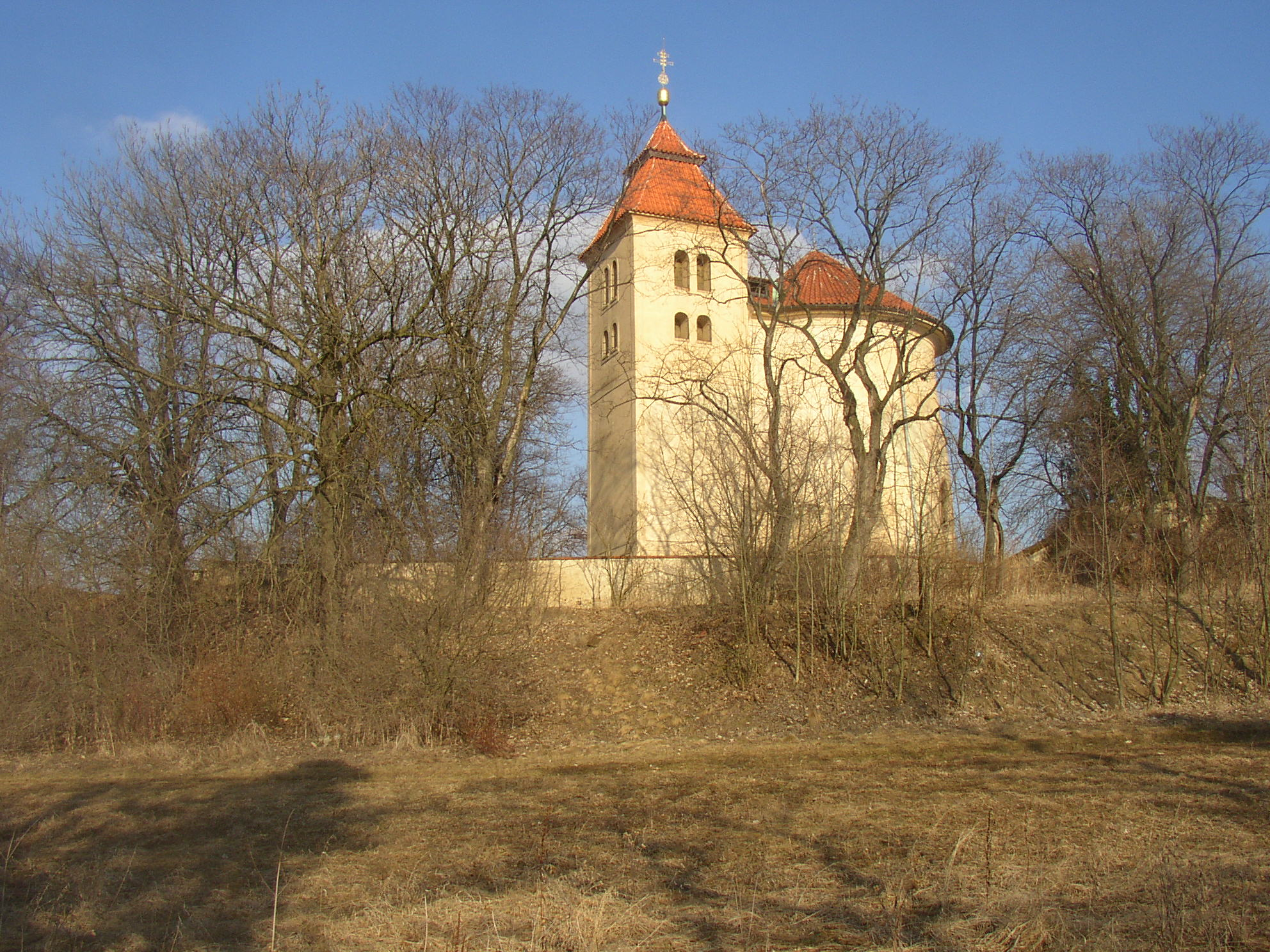
Church of Saints Peter and Paul and the wall of western side of the former Acropolis fortification

Budeč was a gord in Duchy of Bohemia within the modern Czech Republic, founded by the Přemyslid dynasty. It is connected with the presence of St. Wenceslaus. Today it is known as a place with the oldest preserved building in the country, the Church of Saints Peter and Paul.

== Location ==
Budeč is located on a hill in what is today the municipality of Zákolany in the Central Bohemian Region, about 15 kilometres (9 mi) northwest of Prague.

The remains of the gord have an area of 22 hectares (54 acres). It makes Budeč one of the largest early medieval settlements in the country.

== History ==
According to archaeological findings, the hill was inhabited already in prehistoric times. The oldest evidence of the settlement comes from the period dating from the Middle Bronze Age and Knovíz culture of the Late Bronze Age. The first wall in the Slavic period was built right on the remains of prehistoric walls in the 9th century AD, perhaps by the Duke Bořivoj I. The written sources show that at the end of 9th and at the beginning of 10th century Budeč belonged to the main bases of Přemyslid dynasty.

The Church of Saints Peter and Paul is a rotunda built by the Duke Spytihněv I after the year 895. Its nave is the oldest standing building in the country.

Budeč was the place where Saint Wenceslaus (Wenceslaus I, Duke of Bohemia) stayed in his youth. According to "St. Wenceslaus legends", he lived here and learned the basics of education, reading Latin books and singing psalms.

The last mention of Budeč is from the second half of the 13th century, when Queen Kunigunda of Halych donated Budeč to the Vyšehrad Chapter.
