= Mnich (Pelhřimov District) =

- Municipality
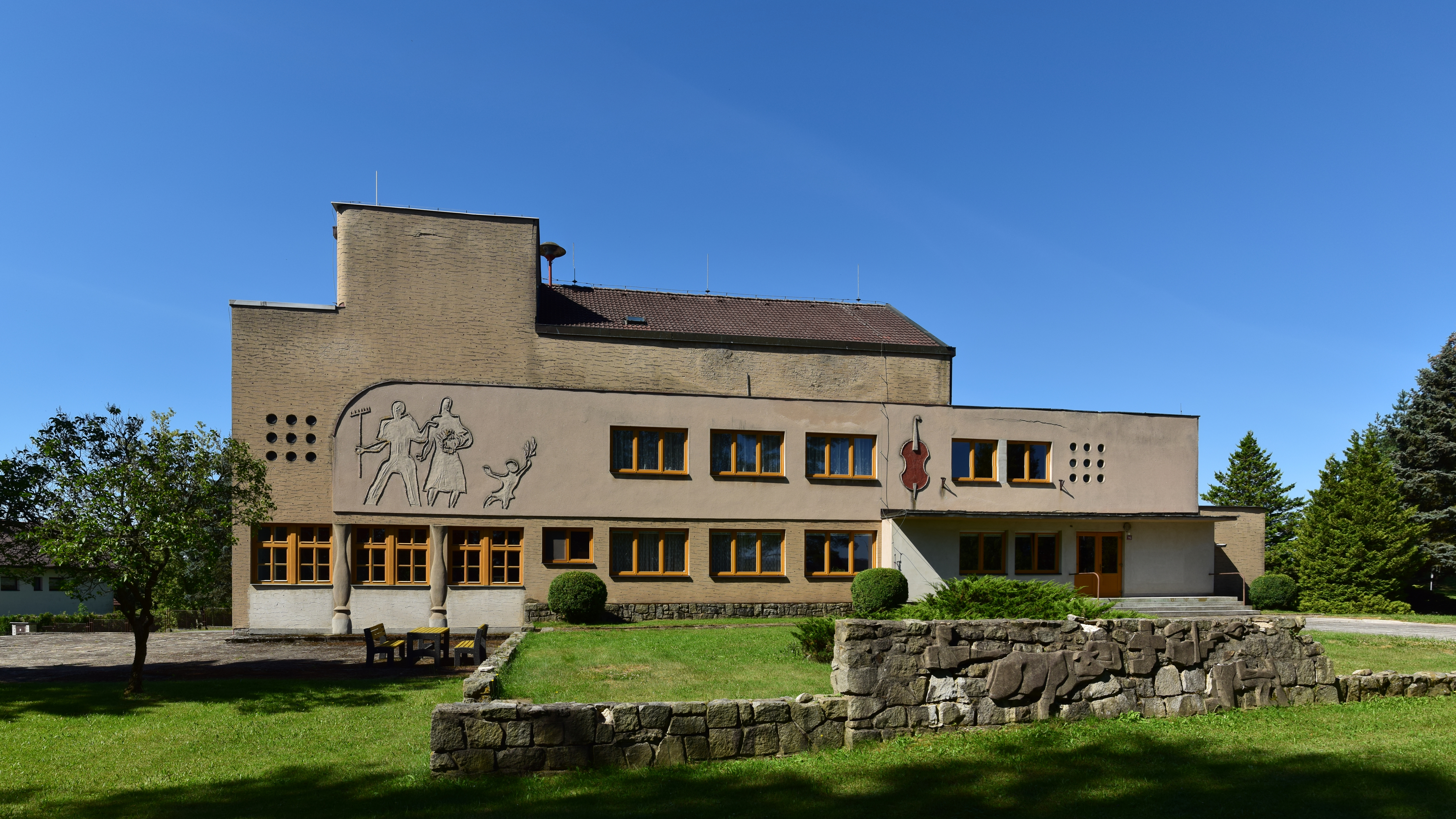
- Municipal office

- Location in the Czech Republic
- Coordinates: 49°17′54″N 14°57′57″E
- Country: Czech Republic
- Region: Vysočina
- District: Pelhřimov
- First mentioned: 1352

Area
  - Total: 19.71 km^{2} (7.61 sq mi)
- Elevation: 553 m (1,814 ft)

Population (2026-01-01)
  - Total: 405
  - Density: 20.5/km^{2} (53.2/sq mi)
- Time zone: UTC+1 (CET)
  - Summer (DST): UTC+2 (CEST)
- Postal codes: 394 70, 394 92, 394 93
- Website: www.mnich.cz

Mnich is a municipality and village in Pelhřimov District in the Vysočina Region of the Czech Republic. It has about 400 inhabitants.

Mnich lies approximately 23 kilometres (14 mi) south-west of Pelhřimov, 46 km (29 mi) west of Jihlava, and 97 km (60 mi) south-east of Prague.

== Administrative division ==
Mnich consists of five municipal parts (in brackets population according to the 2021 census):

- Mnich (232)
- Chválkov (96)
- Dvořiště (11)
- Mirotín (43)
- Rutov (16)

== Demographics ==
Historical population
Year	Pop.	±%
1869	1,262	—
1880	1,296	+2.7%
1890	1,376	+6.2%
1900	1,399	+1.7%
1910	1,406	+0.5%
1921	1,316	−6.4%
1930	1,208	−8.2%
1950	907	−24.9%
1961	842	−7.2%
1970	663	−21.3%
1980	552	−16.7%
1991	488	−11.6%
2001	412	−15.6%
2011	391	−5.1%
2021	398	+1.8%
Source: Censuses
