= Dědice =

- Municipality
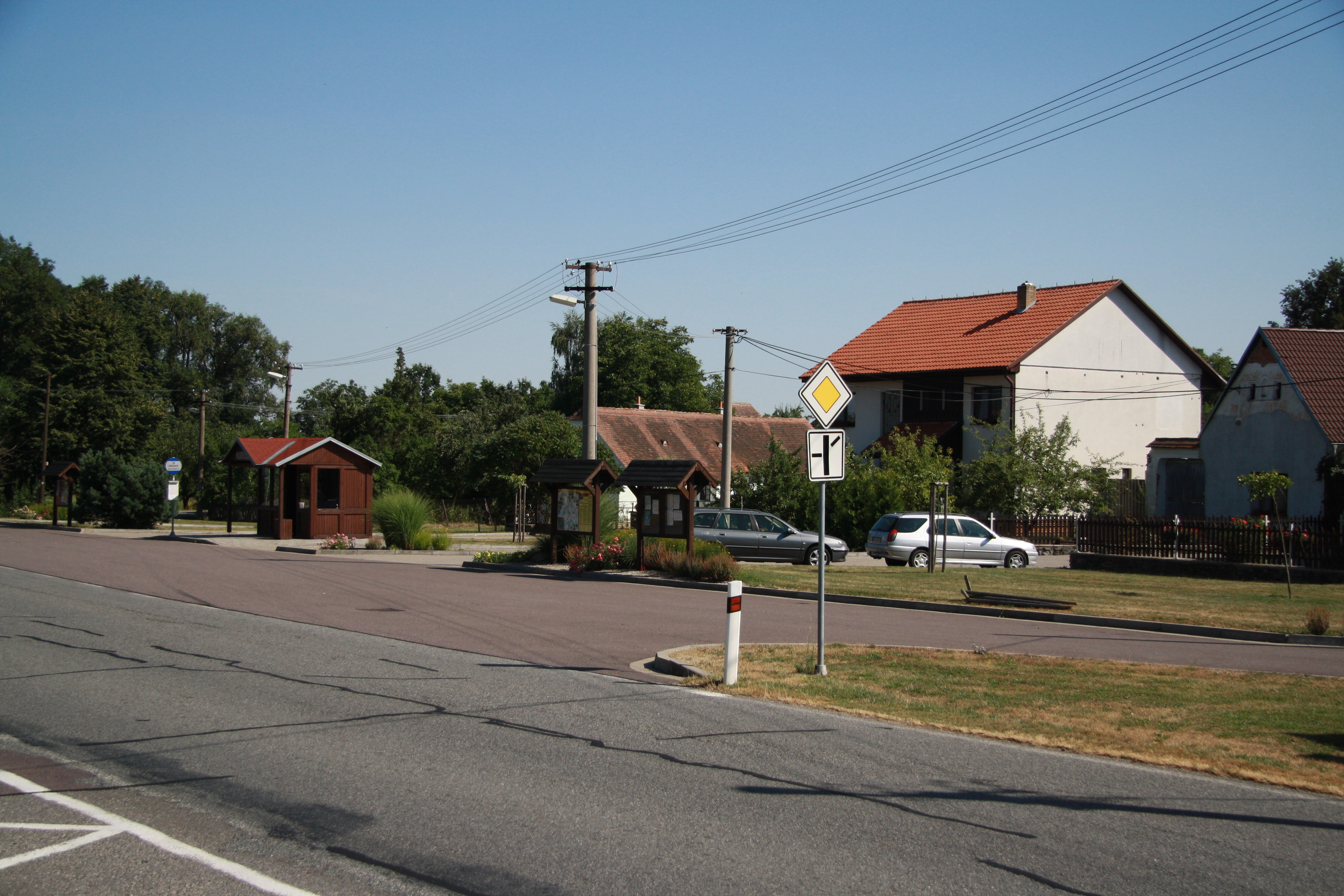
- Centre of Dědice

- Flag Coat of arms

- Location in the Czech Republic
- Coordinates: 49°1′47″N 15°43′40″E
- Country: Czech Republic
- Region: Vysočina
- District: Třebíč
- First mentioned: 1353

Area
  - Total: 4.04 km^{2} (1.56 sq mi)
- Elevation: 475 m (1,558 ft)

Population (2026-01-01)
  - Total: 144
  - Density: 35.6/km^{2} (92.3/sq mi)
- Time zone: UTC+1 (CET)
  - Summer (DST): UTC+2 (CEST)
- Postal code: 675 41
- Website: www.dedice.cz

Dědice is a municipality and village in Třebíč District in the Vysočina Region of the Czech Republic. It has about 100 inhabitants.

Dědice lies approximately 24 kilometres (15 mi) south-west of Třebíč, 42 km (26 mi) south of Jihlava, and 151 km (94 mi) south-east of Prague.

== Demographics ==
Historical population
Year	Pop.	±%
1869	226	—
1880	199	−11.9%
1890	191	−4.0%
1900	200	+4.7%
1910	187	−6.5%
1921	192	+2.7%
1930	210	+9.4%
1950	185	−11.9%
1961	174	−5.9%
1970	174	+0.0%
1980	158	−9.2%
1991	138	−12.7%
2001	141	+2.2%
2011	146	+3.5%
2021	114	−21.9%
Source: Censuses
