= Leškovice =

- Municipality
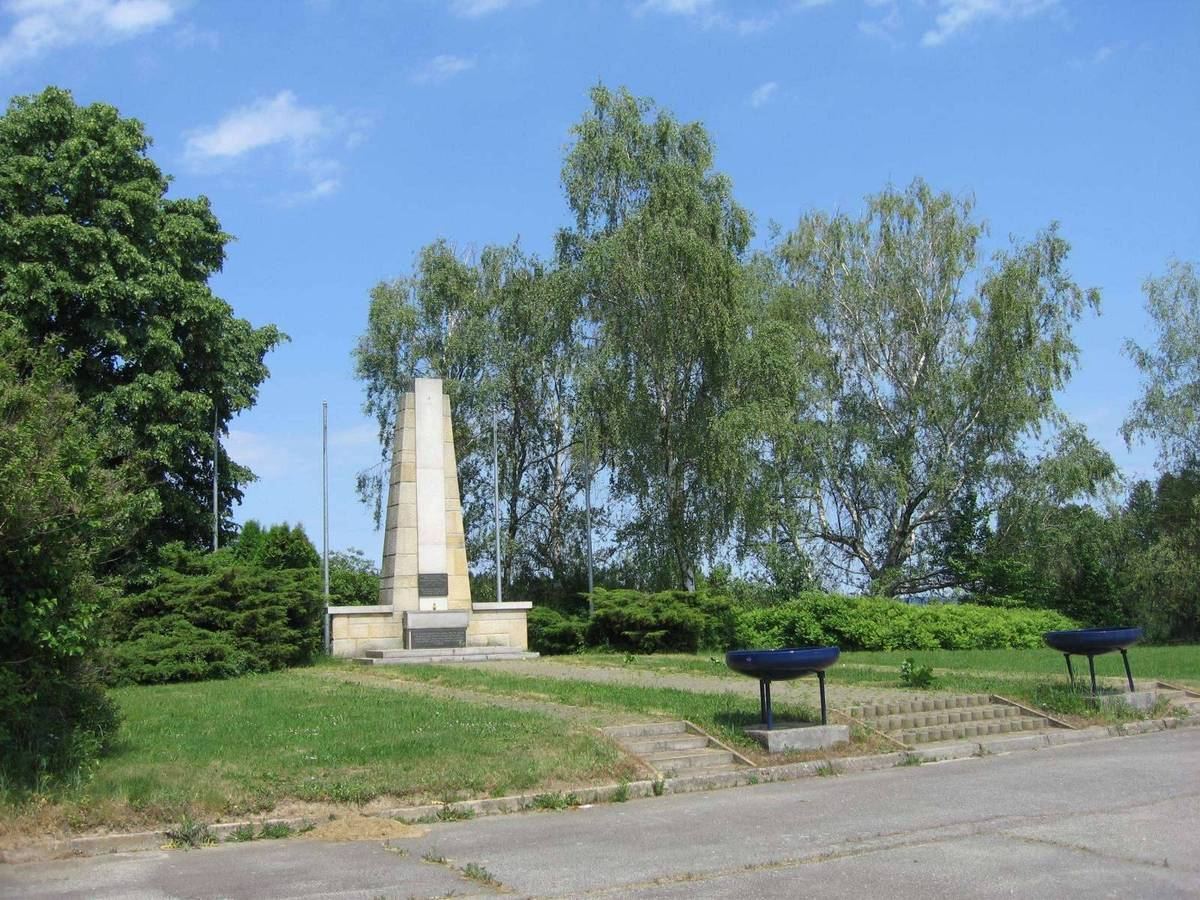
- Monument to the Fallen Partisans

- Flag Coat of arms

- Location in the Czech Republic
- Coordinates: 49°45′47″N 15°32′13″E
- Country: Czech Republic
- Region: Vysočina
- District: Havlíčkův Brod
- First mentioned: 1401

Area
  - Total: 4.25 km^{2} (1.64 sq mi)
- Elevation: 493 m (1,617 ft)

Population (2026-01-01)
  - Total: 93
  - Density: 22/km^{2} (57/sq mi)
- Time zone: UTC+1 (CET)
  - Summer (DST): UTC+2 (CEST)
- Postal code: 582 82
- Website: www.leskovicehb.cz

Leškovice is a municipality and village in Havlíčkův Brod District in the Vysočina Region of the Czech Republic. It has about 90 inhabitants.

Leškovice lies approximately 18 kilometres (11 mi) north of Havlíčkův Brod, 41 km (25 mi) north of Jihlava, and 88 km (55 mi) south-east of Prague.

== Demographics ==
Historical population
Year	Pop.	±%
1869	246	—
1880	251	+2.0%
1890	212	−15.5%
1900	194	−8.5%
1910	216	+11.3%
1921	230	+6.5%
1930	215	−6.5%
1950	149	−30.7%
1961	145	−2.7%
1970	142	−2.1%
1980	116	−18.3%
1991	95	−18.1%
2001	81	−14.7%
2011	67	−17.3%
2021	83	+23.9%
Source: Censuses
