= Josef Boleslav Pecka =

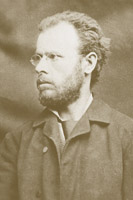

Leader of the Social Democratic Party
- In office 1878–1887
- Preceded by: Position established
- Succeeded by: Josef Hybeš

Personal details
- Born: Josef Boleslav Pecka-Strahovský; 19 September 1849; Prague, Austrian Empire
- Died: 25 July 1897 (aged 47); Chicago, United States
- Political party: Social Democratic Party of Austria Czechoslavonic Social Democratic Party of Austria

Josef Boleslav Pecka (19 September 1849 – 25 July 1897) was a Czech journalist, poet and social democratic politician.
