= Josef Hybeš =

Czech labour leader

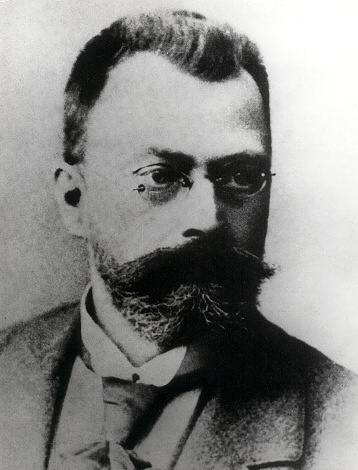
- Josef Hybeš, 1910
- Born: 29 January 1850; Dašice, Austrian Empire
- Died: 19 July 1921 (aged 71); Brno, Czechoslovakia
- Occupations: Labour leader, journalist
- Political party: Czech Social Democratic Party; Communist Party of Czechoslovakia
- Other political affiliations: Social Democratic Workers' Party of Austria

Josef Hybeš (29 January 1850 – 19 July 1921) was a Czech labour leader, socialist politician and journalist. He was a founding member of the Czech Social Democratic Party.

== Biography ==
Josef Hybeš was born into a working-class family of weavers. Due to financial difficulties, he was unable finish school due and began working in textile companies as a child at the age of nine. In 1867 he went to Vienna to look for work and subsequently joined the Workers' Education Association, the cradle of the social democratic movement in Austria. In 1876 he was elected to the central committee of the Austrian Social Democratic Workers' Party.

On 7 April 1878, he co-founded in Prague the Social Democratic Party of Czechoslovakia in Austria with headquarters in Vienna, the first social democratic Czech political party. After a series of police raids and a wave of arrests crippled the Social Democratic leadership in Bohemia in 1881–1882, Hybeš's group in Vienna temporarily became the center of party activity. The party newspaper Dělnické listy was moved here from Prague and the leadership of the Czech Social Democrats was also active there. After the arrest of its members, Hybeš managed the temporary party leadership, and after Josef Boleslav Pecka was arrested, he also took over the management of the editorial office of Dělnické listy.

From 1881 to 1884 he was editor and for some time also editorial director of the Vienna Workers' Papers and a member of Die Zukunft publishing house as well as co-editor of the magazine Die Zukunft. After the state of emergency was declared in Vienna on 31 January 1884, all leading Social Democratic officials were arrested. After his expulsion, he continued to work as a textile worker and was also the publisher of the Prostějov newspaper Hlas lidu for four years. In 1887, Hybeš went to Brno and organized the meeting of Czech workers there and worked as a journalist for the newspaper Rovnost. In 1907 he founded the Association for the Construction of Cheap and Affordable Housing and organized workers' strikes.

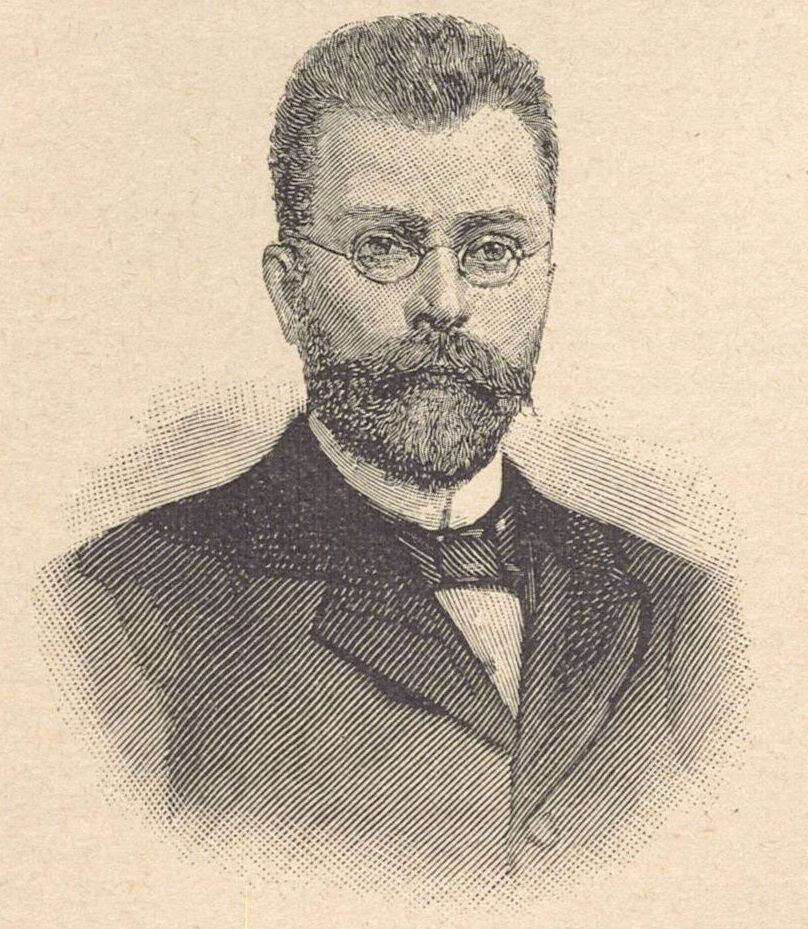
Portrait of Josef Hybeš in 1897

From 1897 until 1919 he was a representative of the Social Democrats in the Imperial Council.

Before the First World War, he was involved in a splinter political formation, the Czech Social Democratic Party in Austria (the so-called centralists), which rejected the excessive division of the social democratic movement by nationality and was a competitor of the traditional Czech Social Democratic Party. After the creation of Czechoslovakia, he (temporarily) represented the unified Czechoslovak Social Democratic Workers' Party. From January 1919 until the end of his term of office in 1920, he sat for it in the Revolutionary National Assembly of the newly formed Czechoslovakia.

He strongly opposed the First World War and after the October Revolution in Russia he sympathized with the extreme left. During the split of Social Democracy in 1919–1921, together with other centralists he joined the left wing of the party.

Grave of Josef Hybeš at the Brno Central Cemetery

In the parliamentary elections of 1920, Hybeš won a senatorial seat in the National Assembly for the Social Democrats. He sat in the senate only briefly, until his death in 1921. The left wing of the Social Democratic Party which by the time of his death had developed in to the Communist Party of Czechoslovakia turned his funeral in to a large communist demonstration. He was buried in the Brno Central Cemetery.

== Honours ==
In Brno, since 1928 (until 1939) and again from 1946, the street “Hybešova”, the former street alley or Silniční in Old Brno (Staré Brno), has been named of Josef Hybeš. After the Second World War, there were numerous places named after Hybeš, most of which were renamed after the Velvet Revolution.

== Bibliography ==
- Otakar Franěk: Josef Hybeš. Práce a vzpomínky, I. – III. díl, Brno 1976.
- Jindřich Veselý: Josef Hybeš, průkopník socialismu, Rovnost, Praha 1951, OCLC 27260074.
- Pavel Kosatík: Čeští demokraté: 50 nejvýznamnějších osobností veřejného života (Tschechische Demokraten: die 50 bedeutendsten Persönlichkeiten des öffentlichen Lebens). Mladá fronta, Praha 2010, ISBN 978-80-204-2373-3.
