= Zákolany =

- Municipality
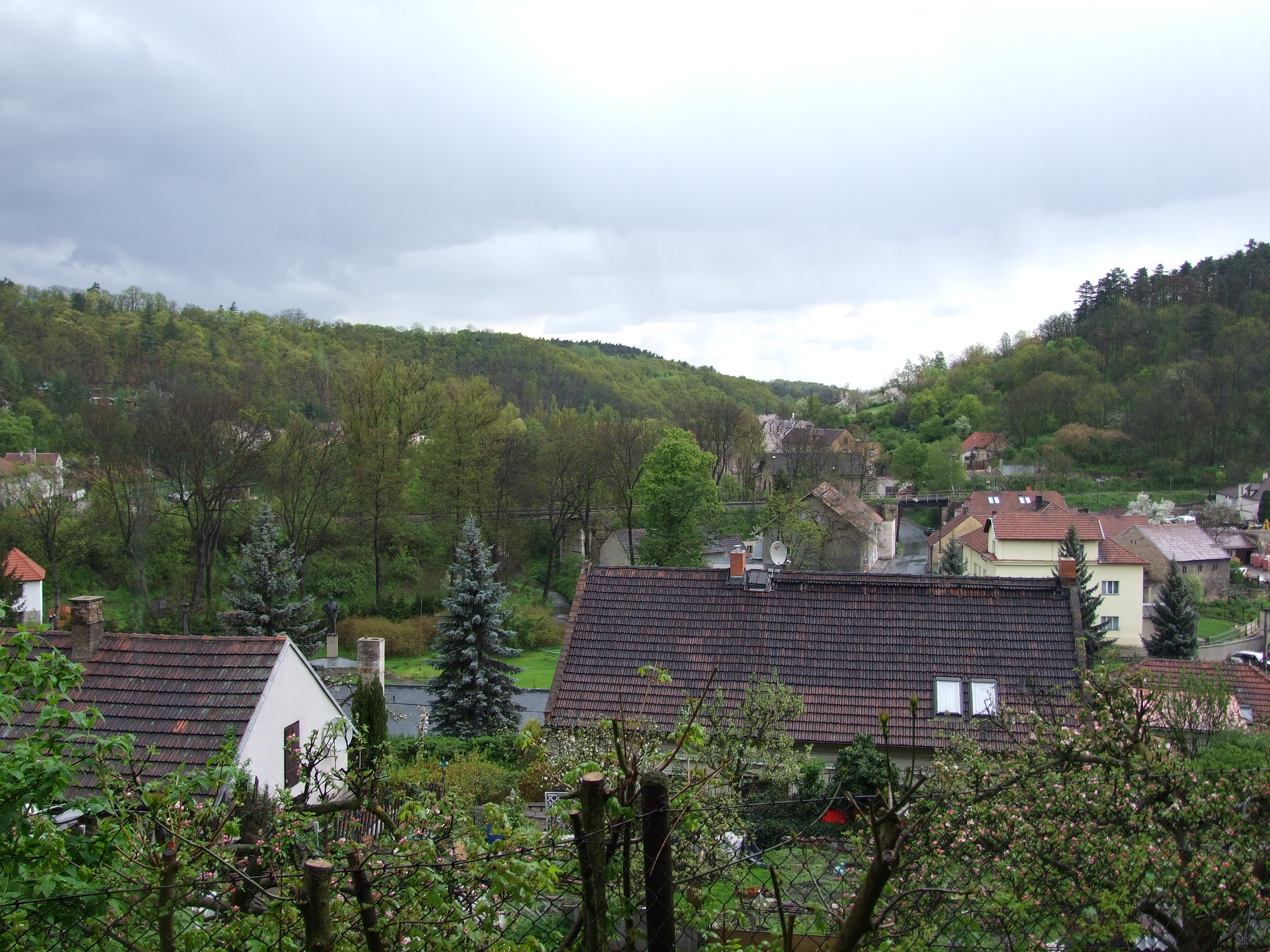
- General view of the village

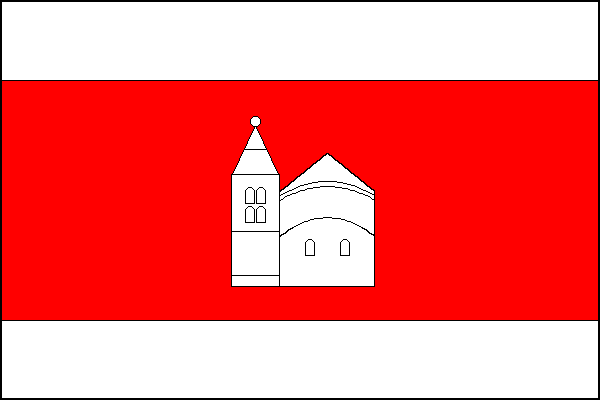
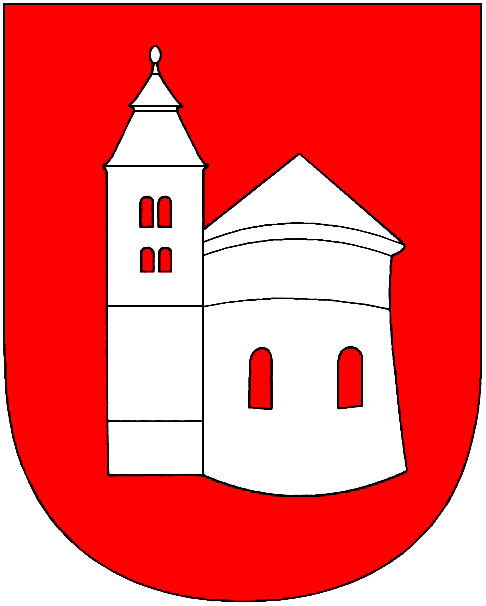
- Flag Coat of arms

- Location in the Czech Republic
- Coordinates: 50°11′49″N 14°14′56″E
- Country: Czech Republic
- Region: Central Bohemian
- District: Kladno
- First mentioned: 1282

Area
  - Total: 5.68 km^{2} (2.19 sq mi)
- Elevation: 235 m (771 ft)

Population (2026-01-01)
  - Total: 610
  - Density: 110/km^{2} (280/sq mi)
- Time zone: UTC+1 (CET)
  - Summer (DST): UTC+2 (CEST)
- Postal code: 273 28
- Website: www.zakolany.cz

Zákolany is a municipality and village in Kladno District in the Central Bohemian Region of the Czech Republic. It has about 600 inhabitants.

== Administrative division ==
Zákolany consists of three municipal parts (in brackets population according to the 2021 census):

- Zákolany (312)
- Kováry (112)
- Trněný Újezd (179)

== Etymology ==
The name Zákolany is derived from the Czech words za kolím (lit. 'behind the stakes') and meant "the village of people who lived behind the palisade".

== Geography ==
Zákolany is located about 11 kilometres (7 mi) northeast of Kladno and 15 km (9 mi) northwest of Prague. It lies in the Prague Plateau. The villages of Zákolany and Kováry are situated in the valley of the stream Zákolanský potok.

== History ==
The first written mention of Zákolany is from 1282.

== Demographics ==
Historical population

Year	Pop.	±%
1869	876	—
1880	961	+9.7%
1890	1,029	+7.1%
1900	1,092	+6.1%
1910	1,079	−1.2%

Year	Pop.	±%
1921	1,068	−1.0%
1930	1,018	−4.7%
1950	889	−12.7%
1961	844	−5.1%
1970	763	−9.6%

Year	Pop.	±%
1980	605	−20.7%
1991	516	−14.7%
2001	485	−6.0%
2011	544	+12.2%
2021	603	+10.8%

Source: Censuses

== Transport ==
Zákolany is located on the railway line Kladno–Kralupy nad Vltavou.

== Sights ==
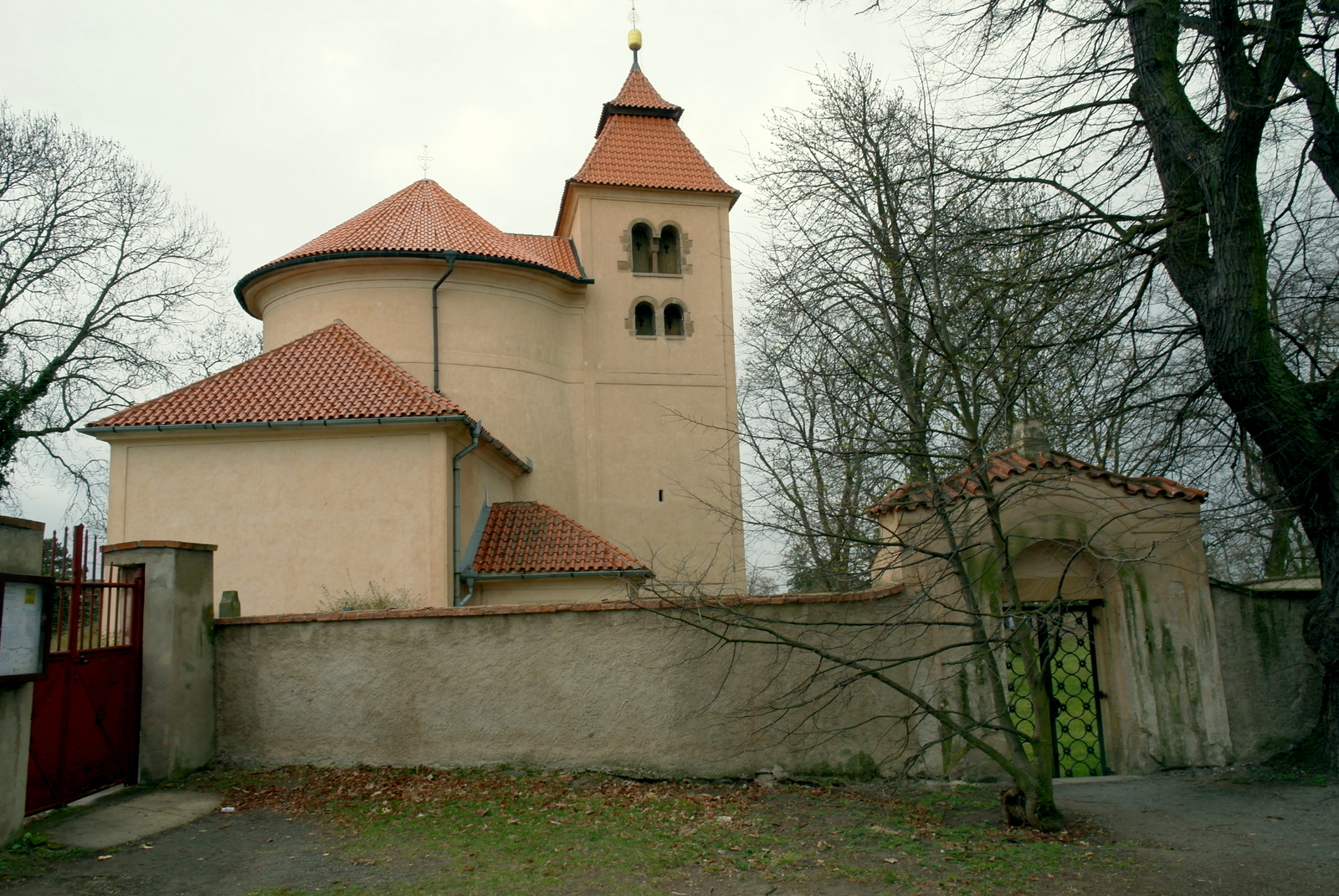
Church of Saints Peter and Paul in Budeč

Zákolany is known for Budeč, which was a 22 ha (54 acres) large gord founded by the first members of the Přemyslid dynasty. The Rotunda of Saints Peter and Paul was built here after 895. The nave of the rotunda is the oldest preserved building in the Czech Republic.

== Notable people ==
- Wenceslaus I (c. 907 – c. 935), Duke of Bohemia, saint; studied in Budeč
- Antonín Zápotocký (1884–1957), communist politician, president of Czechoslovakia in 1953–1957
