= Pirkštejn family =

Czech noble house

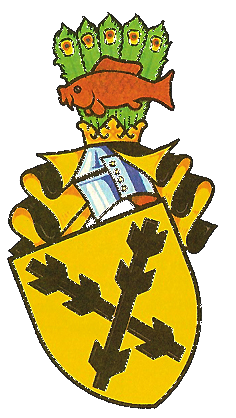
- Parent family: Ronovci family
- Founder: Čeněk of Oybin
- Historic seat: Sloup Castle; Rataje nad Sázavou
- Titles: Lord of Rataje nad Sázavou; Lord of Polná; Supreme Hofmeister of the Kingdom of Bohemia
- Connected members: Jan Ptáček of Pirkštejn; Hynce Ptáček of Pirkštejn

The Lords of Pirkštejn, also known as the Ptáček family of Pirkštejn, were a Czech and later Moravian noble family in the Kingdom of Bohemia.

== History ==
The founder of the Pirkštejn branch is considered to be Čeněk of Oybin. He took the family name from Sloup Castle which was the families first seat. Čeněk acquired additional estates in Moravia through his marriage to Jitka of Honcovice.

Their son, Jan Ješek Ptáček of Pirkštejn, significantly expanded the family’s holdings. He exchanged Sloup Castle for the town and estate of Polná, and later purchased the town of Rataje nad Sázavou, which included two castles. One of these he renamed Pirkštejn Castle in accordance with the family name.

His son Jan was likely one of the signatories of the protest letter against the burning of Jan Hus. However, he otherwise acted as an opponent of the Hussites. Together with Petr II of Šternberk, he also took part in military campaigns against them.

The last male member of the family was Hynce Ptáček of Pirkštejn (the unusual name Hynce is the original Czech form of the German name Heinrich, later written as Hynek). At first, like his father, he supported the royal side, but later he joined the Hussites. Hynce became famous as a politician and diplomat, whose abilities were respected by both Emperor Sigismund of Luxembourg and the diplomat and later Pope Pius II, Aeneas Silvius Piccolomini. With him, the family died out in the male line.

== Legacy ==
Today, the family is mainly remembered through Jan Ptáček of Pirkštejn and his son Hynce Ptáček of Pirkštejn. Jan Ptáček of Pirkštejn was portrayed as the character Hans Capon in the video game Kingdom Come: Deliverance.
