= Jan Ješek Ptáček of Pirkštejn =

Bohemian and Moravian nobleman

- Lord of Polná; Lord of Sloup v Čechách; Lord of Rataje nad Sázavou
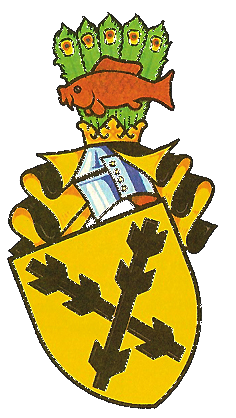
- Coat of arms
- Noble family: Pirkštejn family
- Spouse: Hedvika of Dauba
- Issue: Jan Ptáček of Pirkštejn
- Father: Čeněk of Oybin
- Mother: Jutte of Vildenberka

Jan Ješek Ptáček of Pirkštejn (Note: The family name may also be rendered as Pirkstein, Pirkenstein, Birkenstein, Pürkstein, or Bürgstein.) was a Bohemian and Moravian noble and lord of Sloup v Čechách, Polná, and Rataje nad Sázavou.

== Biography ==
The son of Čeněk of Oybin, Jan Ješek inherited the castles at Sloup v Čechách and Polná. He later acquired the town of Rataje nad Sázavou and its two castles, renaming the lower castle Pirkštejn Castle. It was around this time where Jan Ješek started using the name Ptáček, or "Birdie", which was continually used in his lineage.

Jan Ješek was around 50 years old when his son, Jan Ptáček of Pirkštejn, was born. Soon after, he returned to Polná and retired from political life. He died around the end of the 14th century.

== In popular culture ==
Jan is mentioned in the video game Kingdom Come: Deliverance as Sir Jeschke, the father of Hans Capon.
