= Jan Ptáček of Pirkštejn =

Bohemian nobleman (d. 1419)

- Lord of Rataje nad Sázavou; Lord of Polná
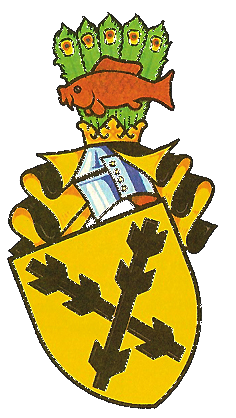
- Coat of arms
- Born: c. 1388
- Died: 1419
- Noble family: Pirkštejn family
- Spouse: Jitka of Kunštát
- Issue: Hynce Ptáček of Pirkštejn
- Father: Jan Ješek Ptáček of Pirkštejn
- Mother: Hedvika of Dubá

Jan Ptáček of Pirkštejn (Note: The family name may also be rendered as Pirkstein, Pirkenstein, Birkenstein, Pürkstein, or Bürgstein.) (c. 1388 – 1419) was a Bohemian noble and lord of Rataje nad Sázavou and Polná. He served as a provincial judge, and later as a Catholic military leader against the Hussites.

== Biography ==
Jan was born to Jan Ješek Ptáček of Pirkštejn likely in 1388, given that some sources declare that he came of age in 1406. He inherited the name "Ptáček", or "Birdie", from his father.

Jan was a minor when his father died at the end of the 14th century. Consequently, Henry III of Lipá became his guardian. Hanuš of Lipá, the son of Henry, became Jan's guardian and administered the holdings after Henry's death. It was not until 1412 that Hanuš was ordered to leave and Jan began to rule his possessions.

Jan served as a judge in the Moravian provincial court. At the beginning of the Hussite Wars, Jan followed the command of his powerful neighbour Petr Konopišťský of Šternberk and fought against the Hussites in the Battle of Živohoště on 4 November 1419. However, after the battle, Jan also signed a declaration in support of the Prague Hussites, effectively ended his hostility against the Hussites. There is no evidence of his subsequent participation in the war, and Petr Konopišťský was later killed in Prague during the Battle of Vyšehrad in 1420.

Jan died in 1419 and was buried in the family crypt in the Church of Saint Matthew in Rataje nad Sázavou.

== Family ==
Jan married Jitka of Kunštát, a daughter of Moravian nobleman Erhart the Elder of Kunštát. Together they had one son, Hynce Ptáček of Pirkštejn, who became an important military leader and diplomat. Hynce succeeded the Rataje and Polná estates in 1420.

== In popular culture ==
Hans Capon, a major character in the 2018 video game Kingdom Come: Deliverance, is based on Jan Ptáček. The character is depicted as part of the pro-Wenceslaus faction. He also features in the 2025 sequel Kingdom Come: Deliverance II.
