= Oybin =

- Municipality
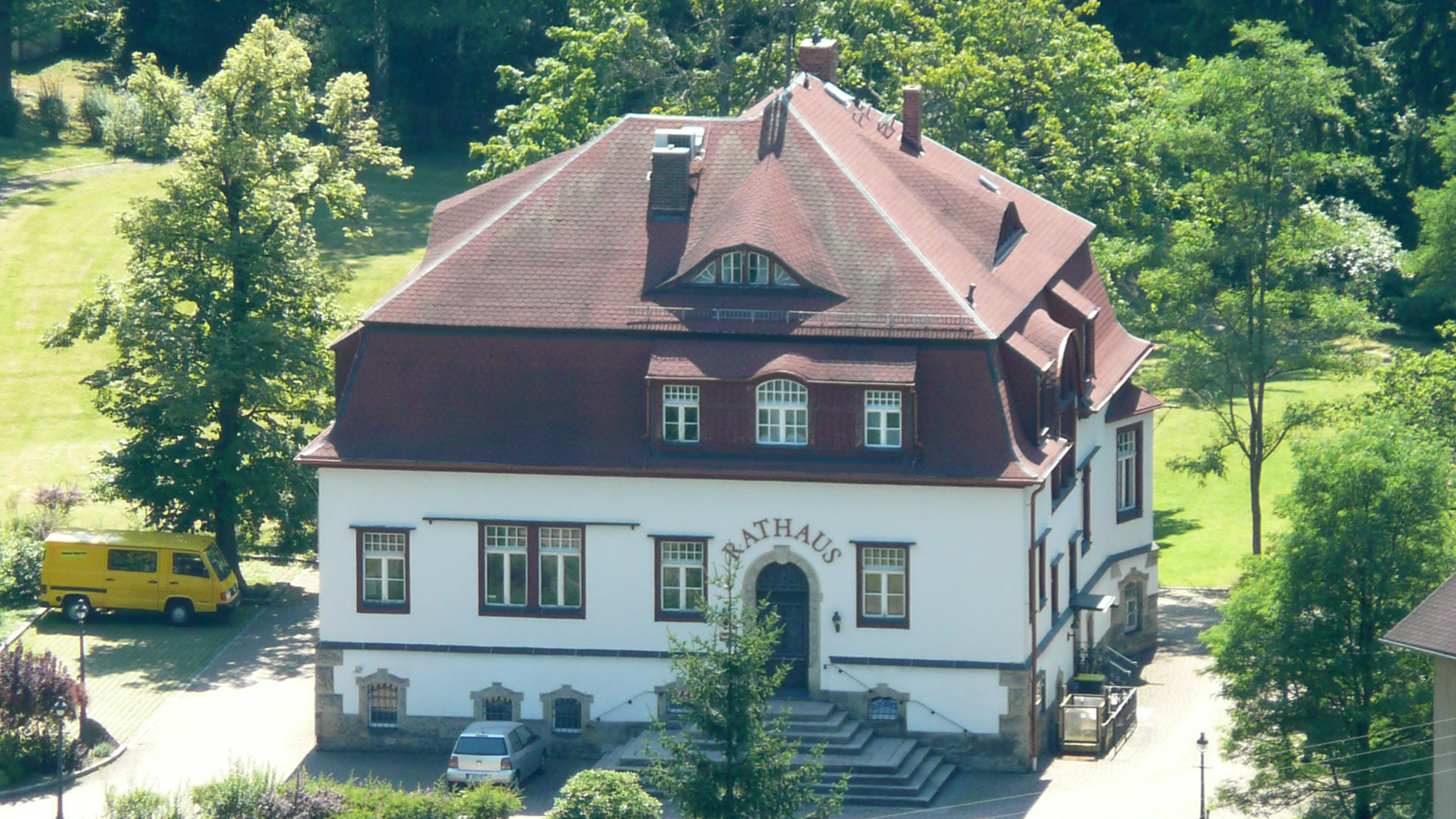
- Town hall

- Coat of arms

- Location of Oybin within Görlitz district
- Interactive map of Oybin
- Location within Germany Location within Saxony
- Coordinates: 50°50′32″N 14°44′34″E
- Country: Germany
- State: Saxony
- District: Görlitz
- Subdivisions: 4 Ortsteile

Government
  - Mayor (2018–25): Tobias Steiner

Area
  - Total: 18.29 km^{2} (7.06 sq mi)
- Elevation: 389 m (1,276 ft)

Population (2025-12-31)
  - Total: 1,271
  - Density: 69.49/km^{2} (180.0/sq mi)
- Time zone: UTC+01:00 (CET)
  - Summer (DST): UTC+02:00 (CEST)
- Postal codes: 02797
- Dialling codes: 035844
- Vehicle registration: GR, LÖB, NOL, NY, WSW, ZI
- Website: www.oybin.com

Oybin (Upper Sorbian: Ojbin, pronounced [ˈɔjbʲin]) is a municipality in the Görlitz district, in Saxony, in eastern Germany, located very close to the border of the Czech Republic. It is a "Kurort", a resort or spa certified by the state, where people go for rest and recuperation.

It is most famous for its mountain of the same name, an exposed natural sandstone dome that towers above the town. The ruins of a medieval monastery lend a wild romantic beauty to it and it was a favorite subject of 19th-century Romantic painters like Caspar David Friedrich. Many bizarrely shaped geological rock formations can be found in the surroundings. The scenic narrow gauge Zittau–Kurort Oybin/Kurort Jonsdorf railway runs from Oybin to Bertsdorf, from there to the neighboring municipality of Jonsdorf and the town of Zittau. Oybin municipality has 3 districts: Oybin, Hain and Lückendorf.

== History ==
In 1319 it passed to the Duchy of Jawor, the southwesternmost duchy of fragmented Piast-ruled Poland, and later on it was also ruled by Bohemian, Hungarian, Saxon and Polish monarchs. Following the defeat of the Protestant armies by the Habsburgs in the Battle of the White Mountain in 1620, many Protestant Czechs found refuge across the border in the hills of Upper Lusatia.

== Culture and sights ==
- a baroque mountain church built in 1734
- Periodic historical monk processions lit by torchlight
- Oybin railway station with small museum about the history of the Zittau Narrow Gauge Railway
- Teufelsmühle ("Devil's Mill")
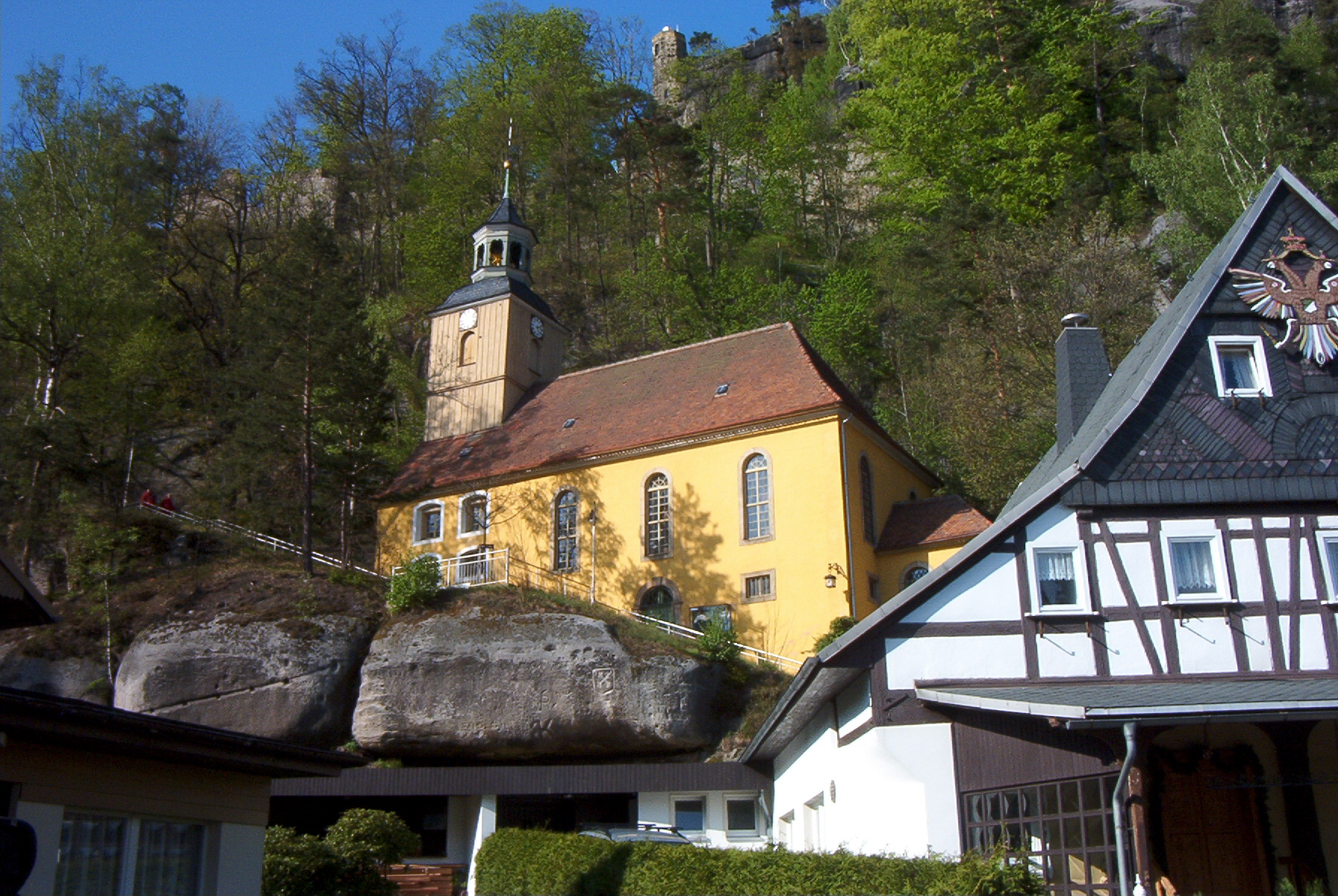
Church in Oybin

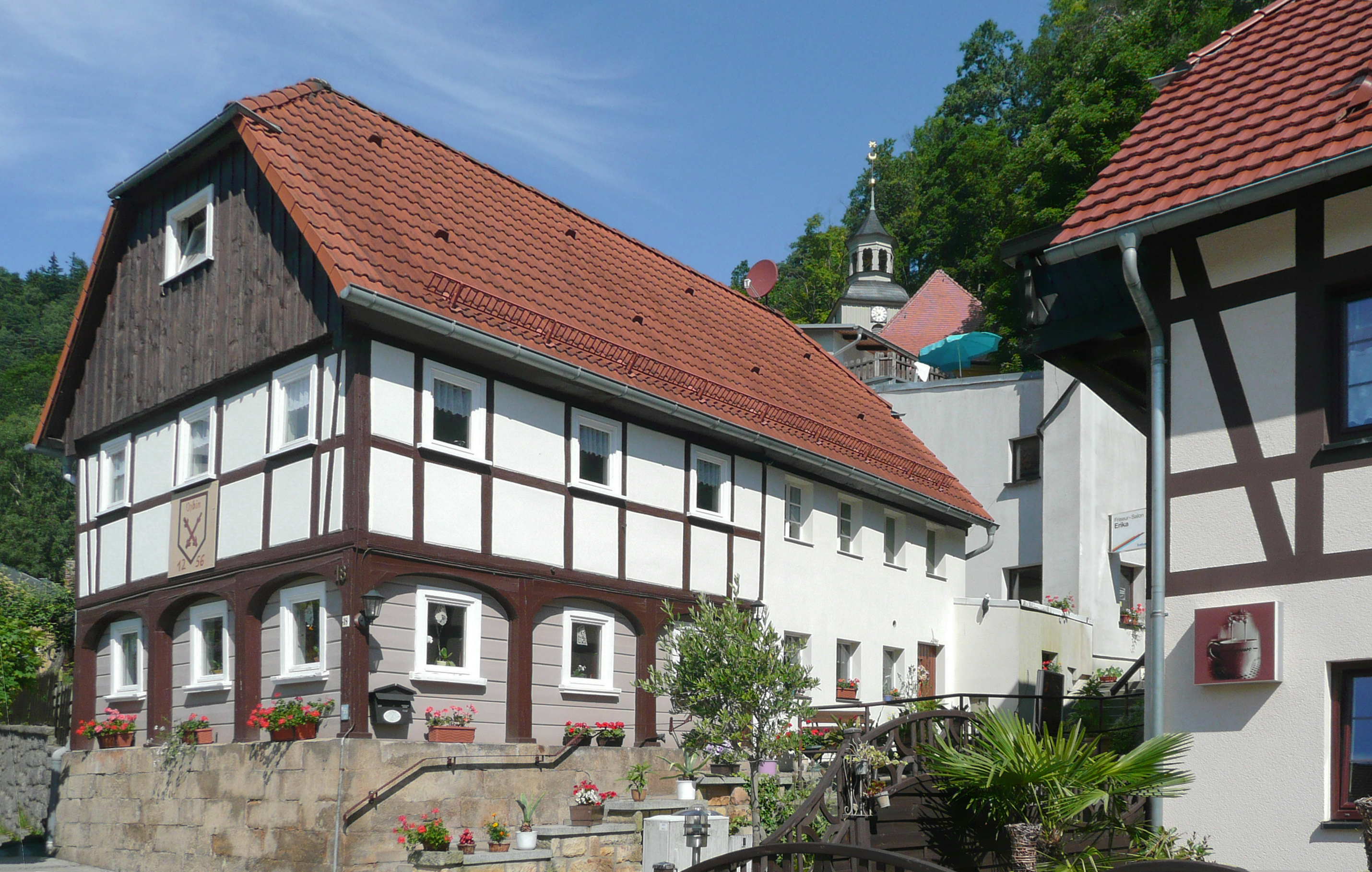
Timber-frame house

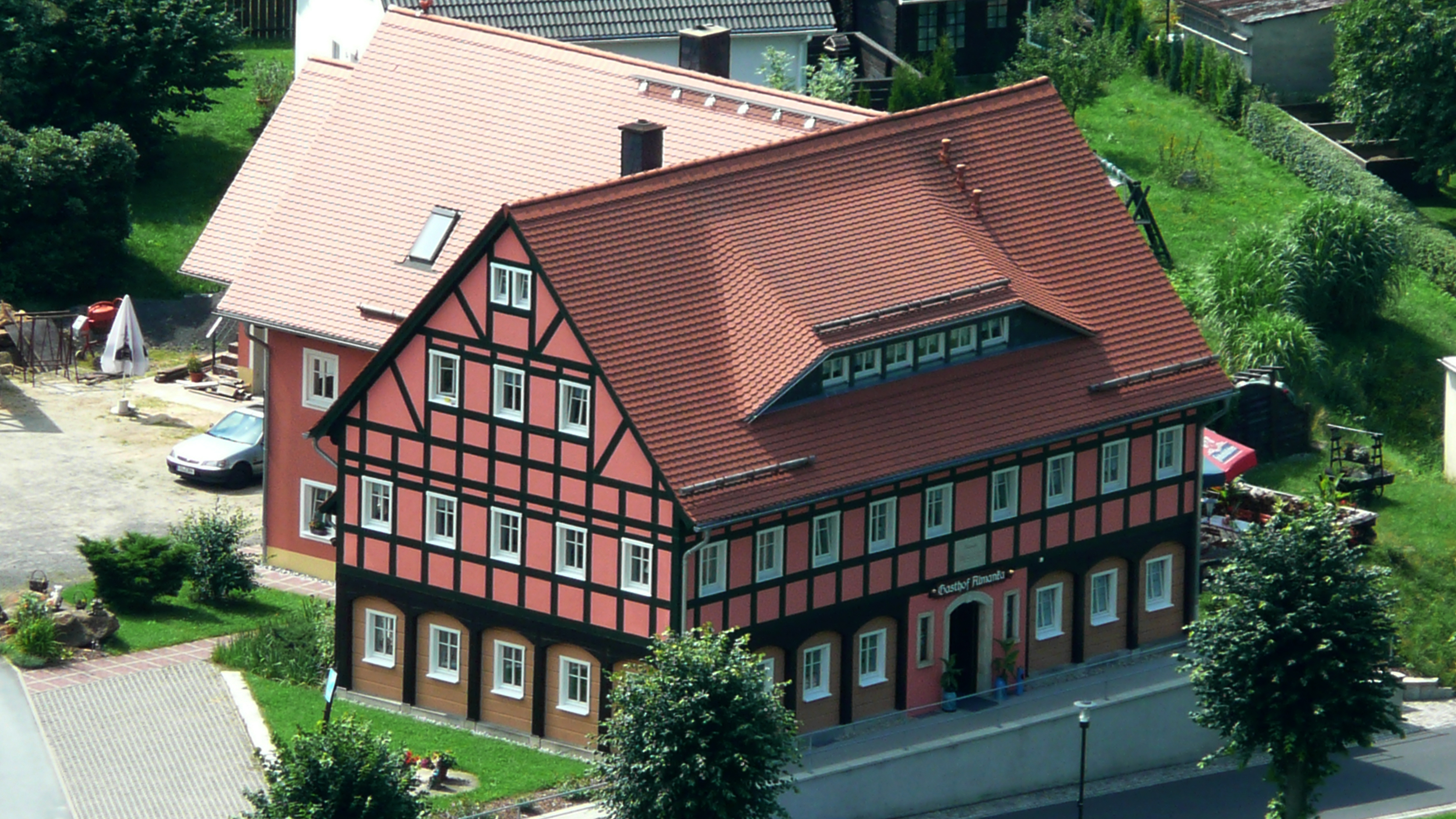
The half-timbered "Almanka" Inn

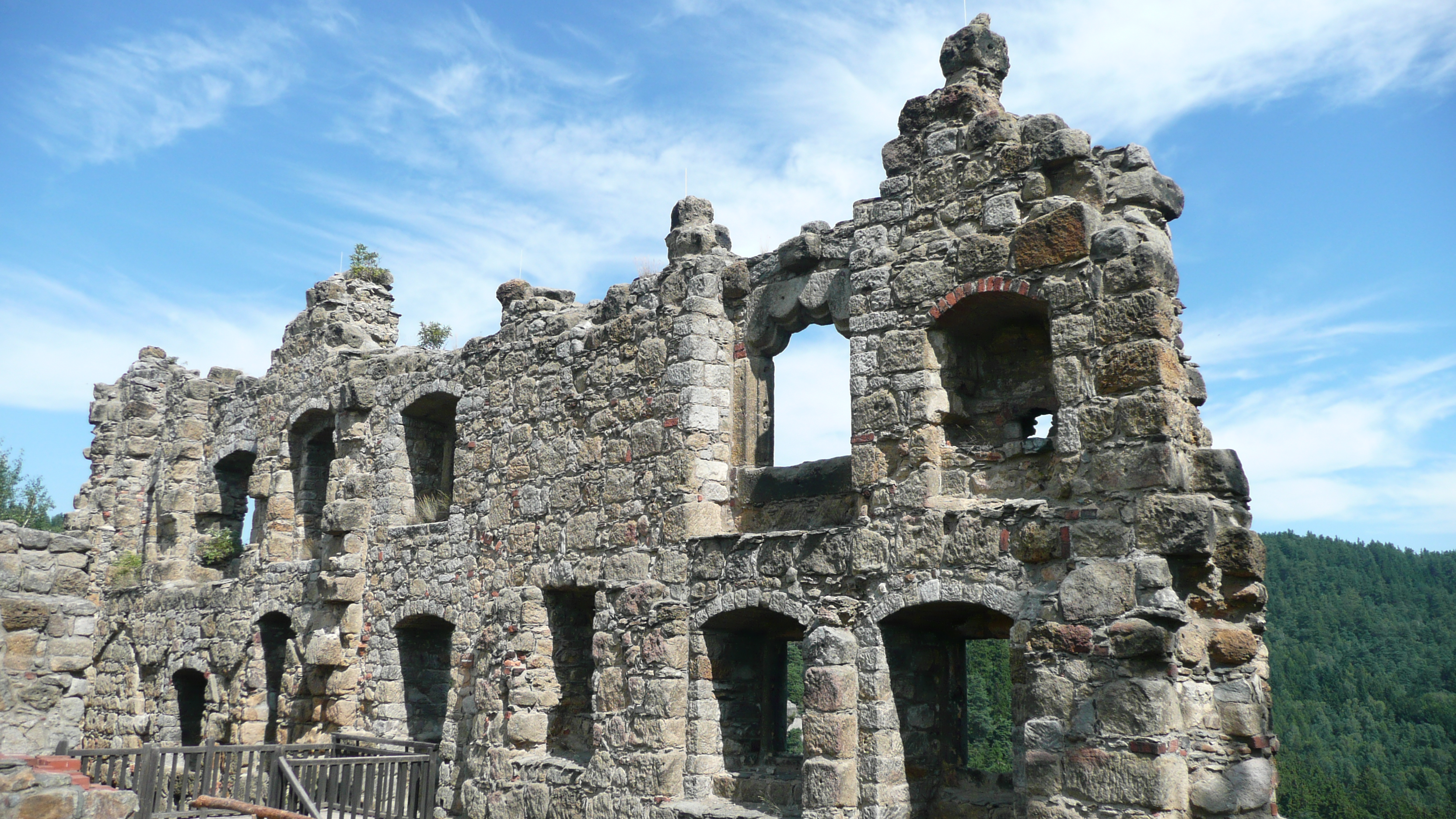
Castle ruins on mount Oybin

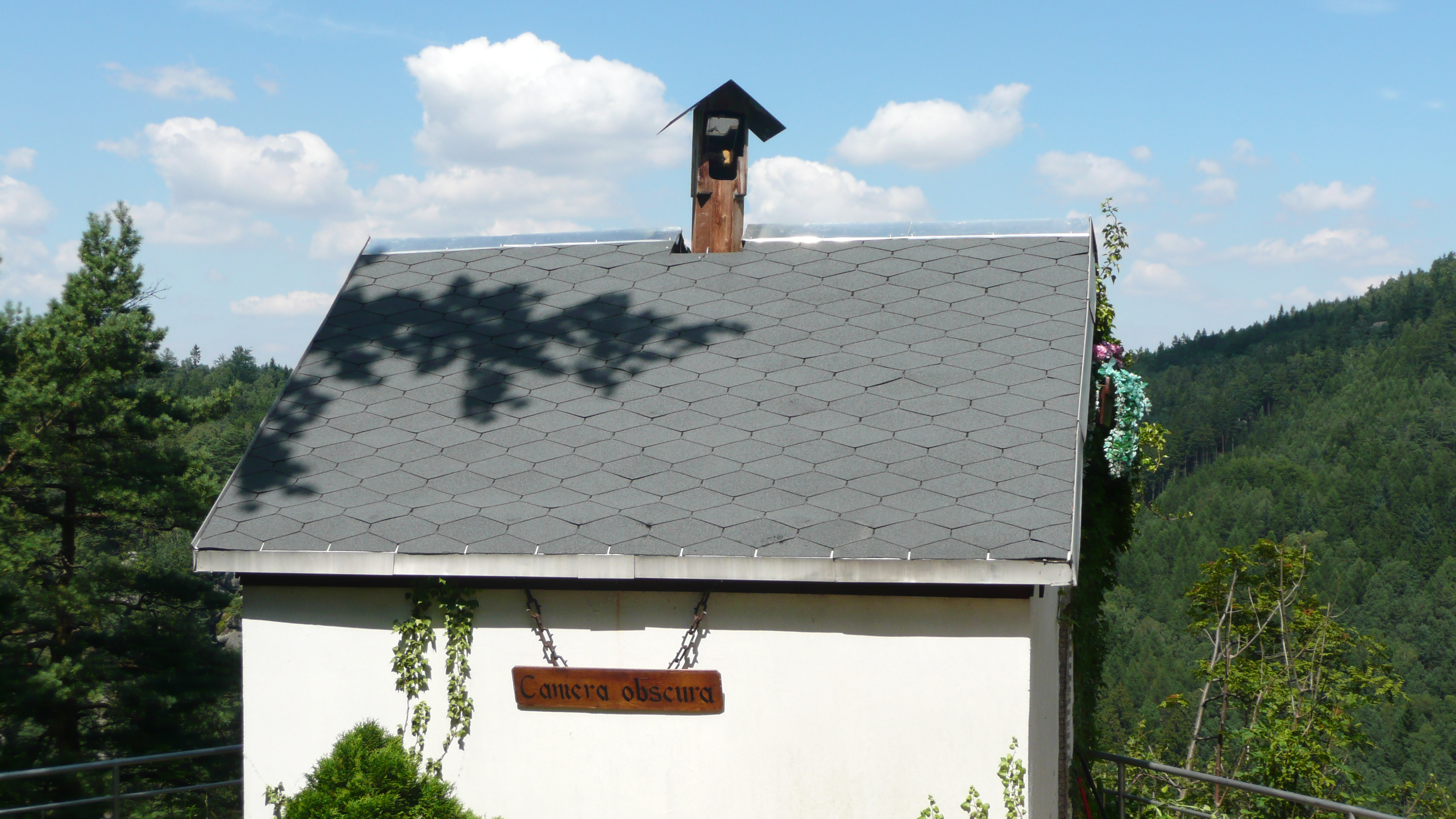
Camera obscura

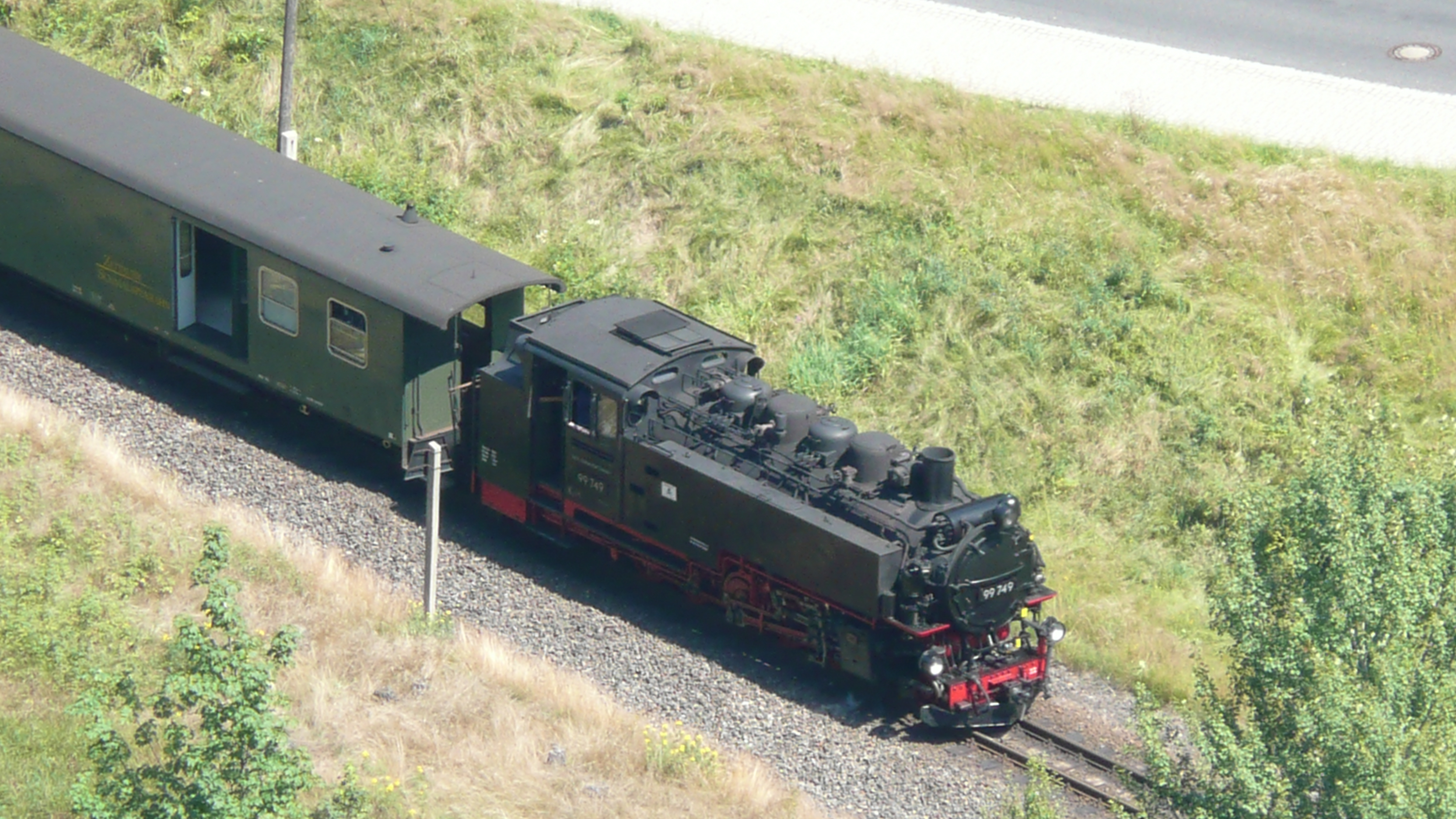
Narrow-gauge steam train

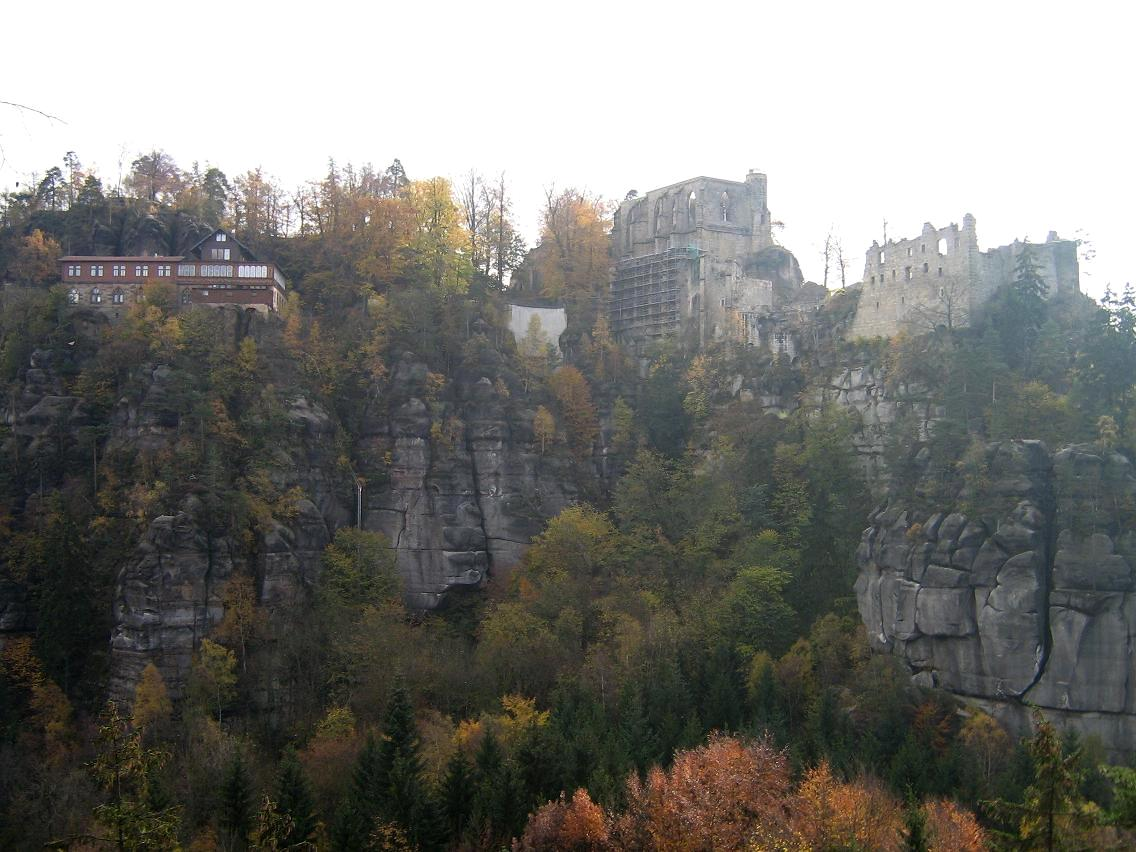
Mount Oybin with restaurant and castle ruins

== Surroundings and landmarks ==
- Rosensteine (Rose Stones) with Kelchstein (Chalice Rock), a red mushroom rock
- The Große Felsengasse (Large Canyon Alley) with Muschelsaal (Shell Hall) and the via ferrata "Alpiner Grat"
- Mount Scharfenstein (Sharp Stone)
- Mount Hochwald (Highwood) with look-out tower and 2 mountain huts
- Mount Töpfer (Potter) with mountain hut
- Ameisenberg (Anthill rock)
- Mount Oybin
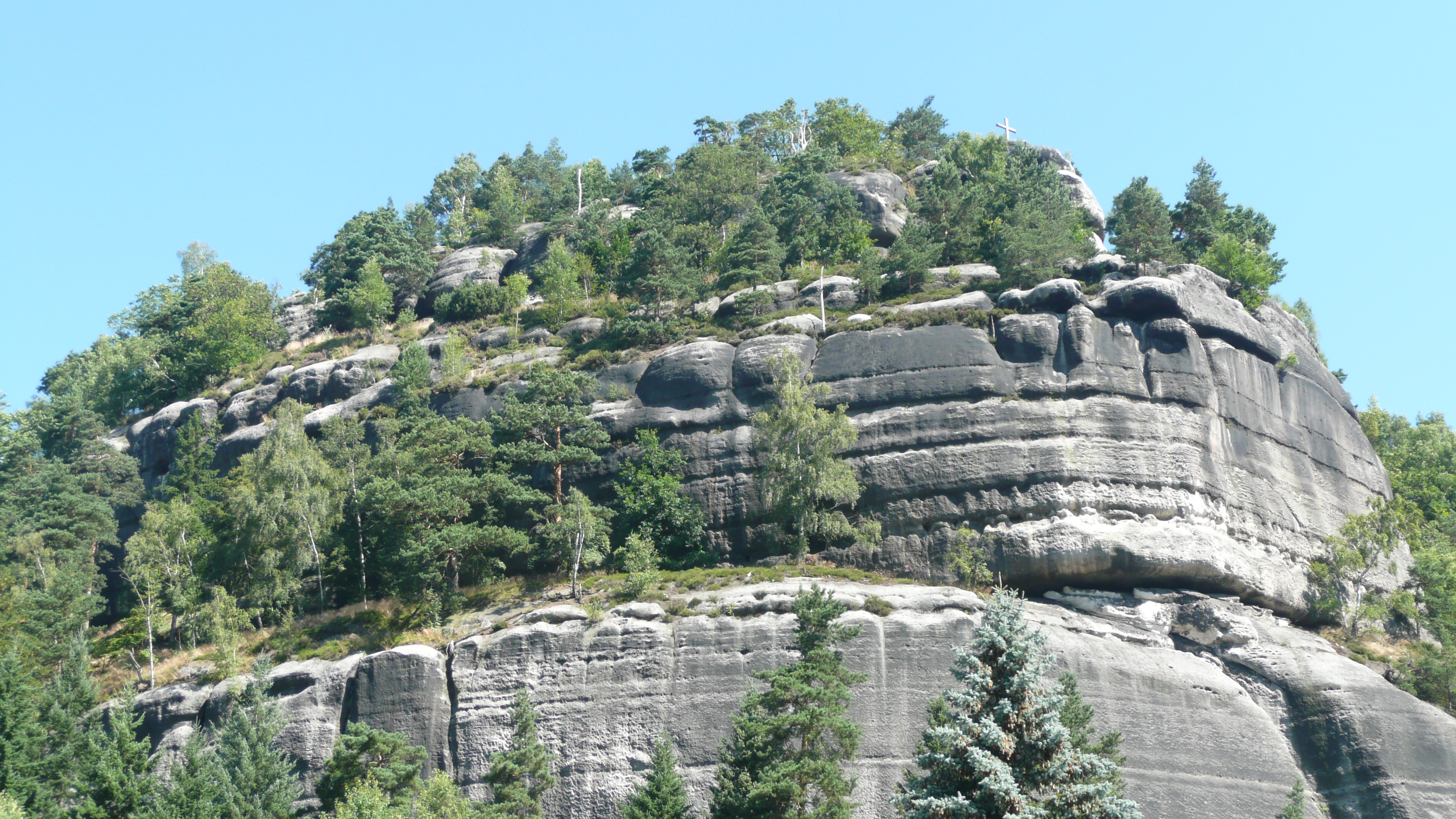
Mount Oybin

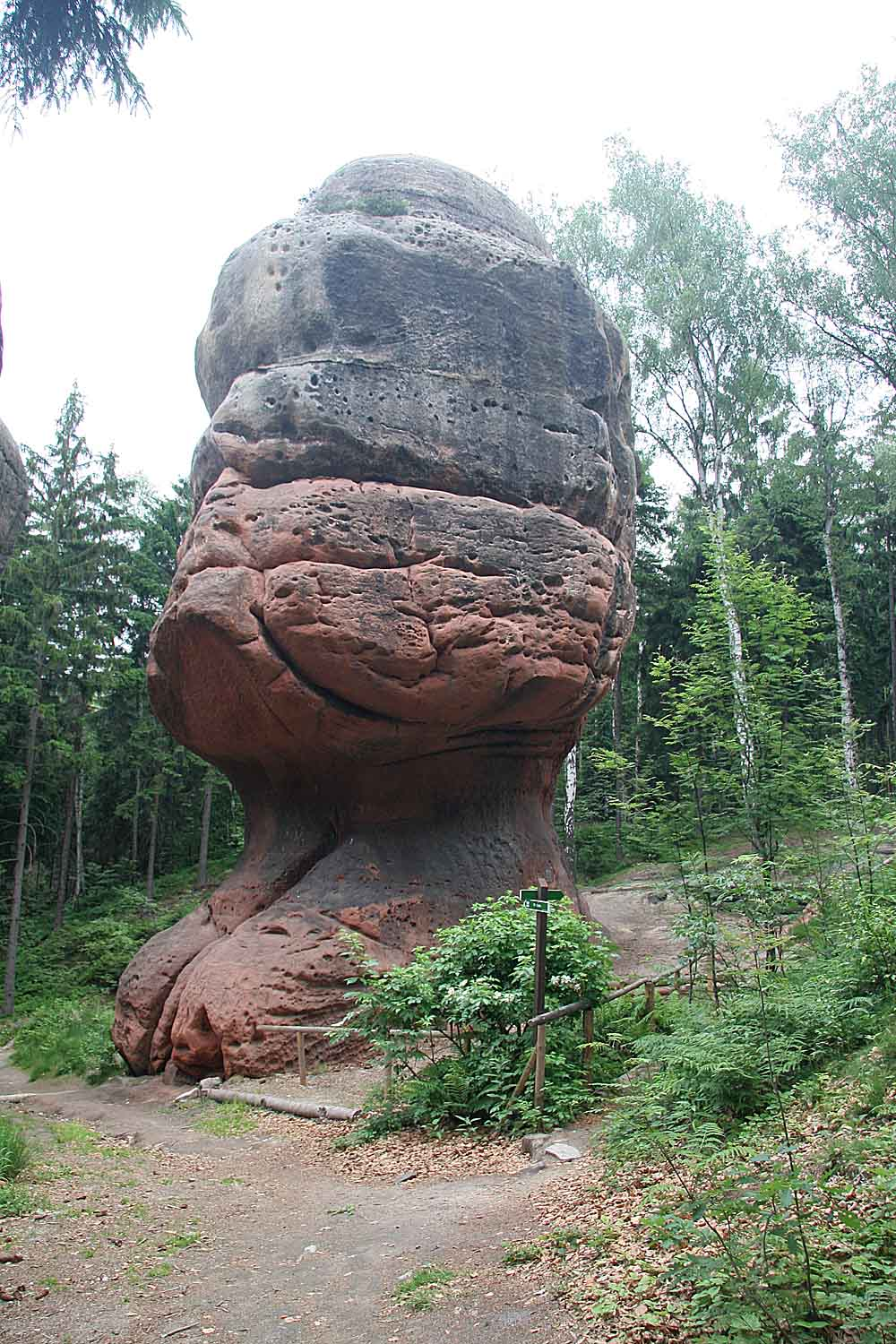
The "Chalice rock" (Kelchstein)

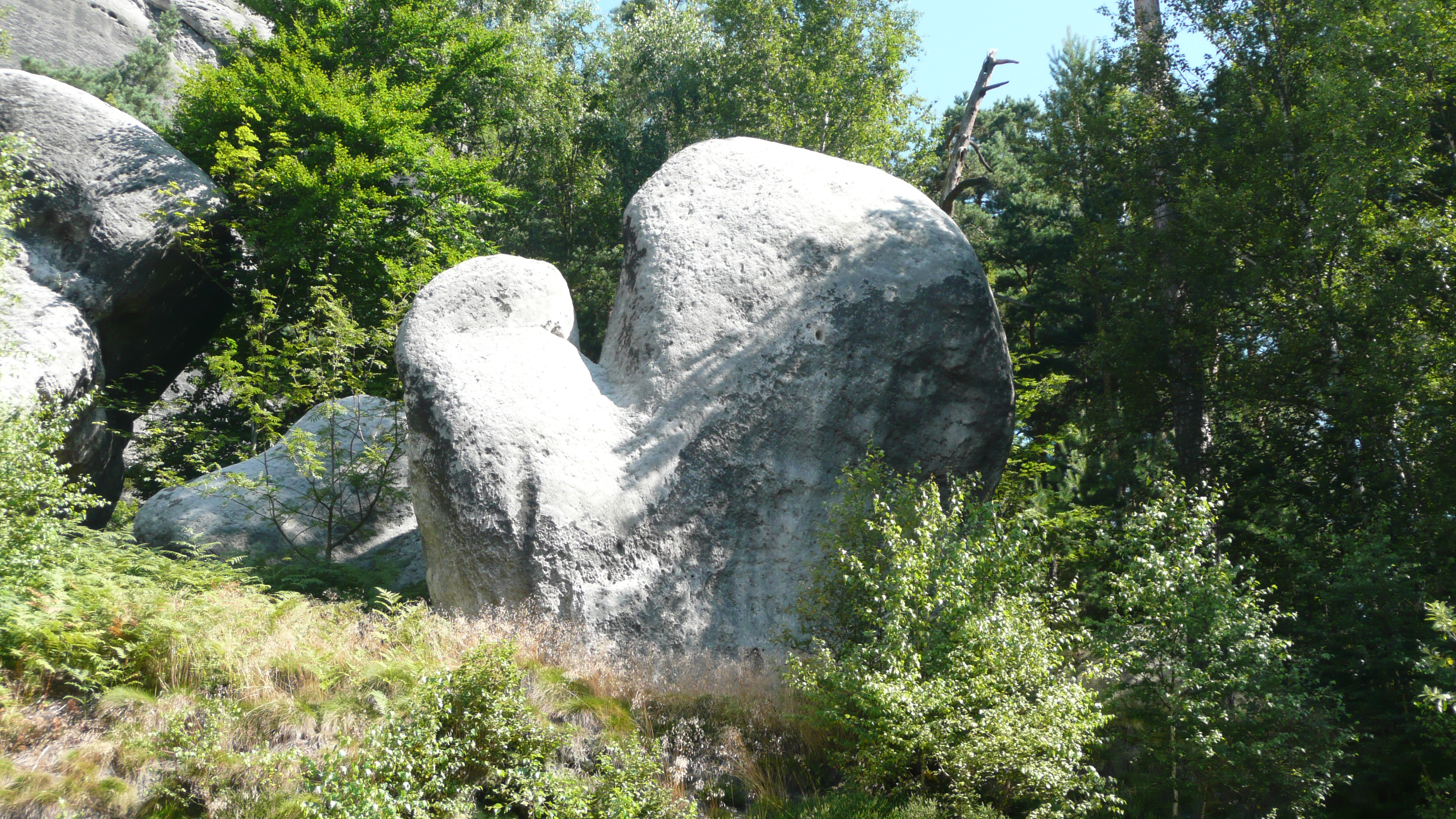
The "Mitten Rock" (Handschuh-Felsen)

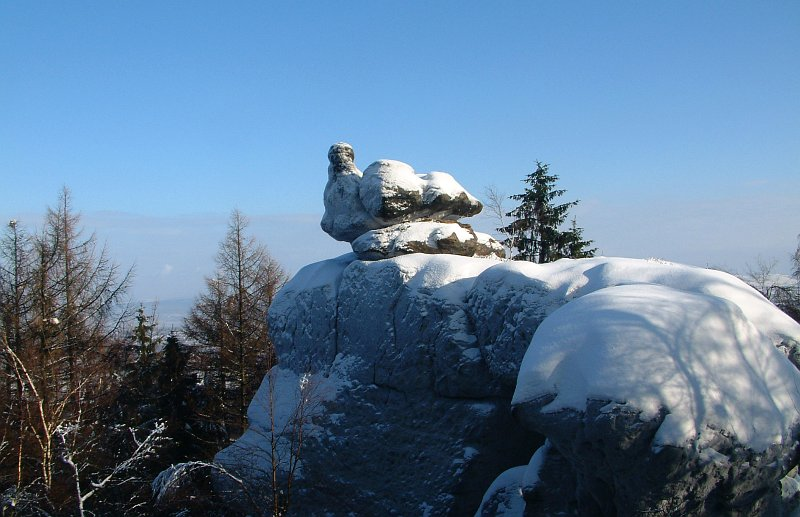
The "Broody Hen" (Brütende Henne) on Mount Töpfer

== Notable people ==
- Chval of Lipá (born and died in the 13th century), Czech nobleman from the Ronovci family and the founder of the family of the Lords of Lipá.
- Čeněk of Oybin (fl. 1290–1346), Czech nobleman, landowner, and founder of the Pirkštejn family.
