= Čeněk of Oybin =

Czech nobleman

- Lord of Sloup v Čechách
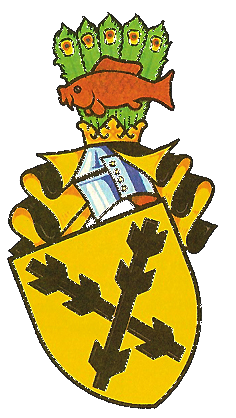
- Coat of arms
- Native name: Čeněk z Ojvína
- Other names: Čeněk of Pirkštein; Čeněk of Ojvína
- Noble family: Pirkštejn family
- Spouse: Jitka of Honcovice
- Issue: Jan Ješek Ptáček of Pirkštein
- Father: Chval of Lipá (disputed)

Čeněk of Oybin (Note: Czech: Čeněk z Ojvína, Čeněk z Berkenstein, or Čeněk z Pyrkenstein; German: Čeněk von Oybin or Čeněk von Birkenstein) (fl. 1290–1346) was a Czech nobleman, landowner, and founder of the Pirkštejn family.

== Biography ==
Čeněk was born to the prominent Ronovci family, though the date of his birth remains unknown. Čeněk is traditionally considered to be the son of Chval of Lipá. However, some research suggests that there is a missing generation, and that Čeněk and his brother Henry of Lipá may be the grandsons of Chval instead. It has been proposed that Chval's son Čeněk of Lipá is not identical to Čeněk of Oybin, and perhaps the two brothers are the sons of the elder Čeněk. (Note: Čeněk of Lipá is last mentioned in 1278, and according to M. Sovadina, he probably died in battle. Čeněk of Oybin first appears in sources in 1290 and Henry of Lipá in 1296.)

Čeněk of Oybin first appears in the record in 1290 at Oybin. He was later mentioned in documents from the royal court of Prague in 1296 with his brother Henry.

Čeněk built the castle at Sloup v Čechách, which was first mentioned in 1324. He used stones reminiscent of the ones used for building Ojivín Castle. Sloup Castle, known as Perkenstein or Pirkštejn, became his main seat and was integrated into his family name.

Čeněk acquired other estates in Moravia by marrying Jitka of Honcovice. The last time he was mentioned is in the will of his nephew Pertold of Lipá, documented in 1346. Pertold bequeathed his uncle the farm and castle of Račice (part of modern-day Račice-Pístovice) in Moravia.
