= Battle of Živohoště =

1419 battle of the Hussite Wars

Coordinates: 49.7544°N 14.4214°E

Battle of Živohošť
- Part of Hussite Wars
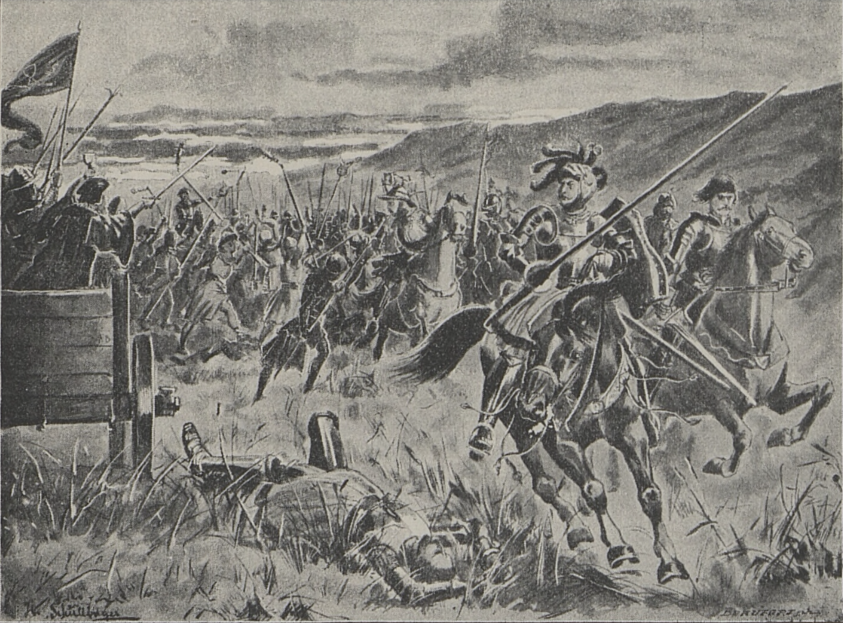
- Battle of Živohošť (by Hugo Schüllinger, c. 1900)
Date	4 November 1419
Location	Živohošť
Result	Partial surrender of Hussites, retreat of Catholics

Belligerents
Bohemian Catholic nobility	Hussite pilgrims from Sezimovo Ústí; Hussites of Western Bohemia

Commanders and leaders
Peter of Sternberg; Jan Ptáček of Pirkstein	Unknown

Strength
1,300	4,000

Casualties and losses
Unknown	Several killed and wounded Large number of prisoners

The Battle of Živohošť took place on 4 November 1419 during the Hussite Wars. Hussite pilgrims from Alttabor (Czech: Sezimovo Ústí) came to the countrywide congress in Prague, where they fought the Czech Catholic nobility following King Sigismund of Luxembourg and under the command of Peter Konopišťský of Sternberg. After the first attack, a number of Hussites were killed, wounded, or captured, but reinforcements from West Bohemia led by the Hussites from Nový Knín arrived, forcing the Czech barons to retreat to Kuttenberg. According to contemporary written sources, the Battle of Živohošť was the first major battle of the Hussite Wars.
