= Chval of Lipá =

Czech nobleman and marshal

- Lord of Zittau, Oybin, and Ronov
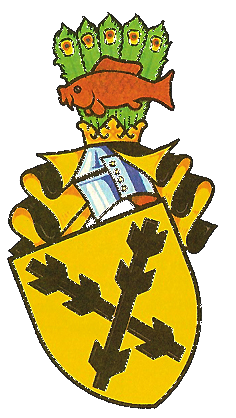
- Coat of arms
- Native name: Chval z Lipé
- Other names: Chval of Zittau
- Noble family: Ronovci family Lipá family
- Spouse: Jitka of Honcovice
- Issue: Henry of Lipá (disputed); Čeněk of Oybin (disputed)
- Father: Častolov of Zittau

Chval of Lipá (also known as Chval of Zittau; born and died in the 13th century) was a Czech nobleman from the Ronovci family and the founder of the family of the Lords of Lipá.

== Biography ==
He was the grandson of the first known ancestor of the Ronovci family, Smil of Tuháň, as the youngest son of Častolov of Zittau. He appears sporadically in historical sources from 1253 to 1262, probably holding Zittau, Oybin and Ronov. Chval likely founded Lipý castle, around which the town Česká Lípa later arose. Chval's son Čeněk was the first to use the epithet of Lipá in 1277.

Chval is considered to be the father of Henry of Lipá and Čeněk of Oybin. However, some research suggests that there is a missing generation, and Chval is their grandfather instead. It has been proposed that Chval's son Čeněk of Lipá is not identical to Čeněk of Oybin, and perhaps the two brothers are the sons of the elder Čeněk. (Note: Čeněk of Lipá is last mentioned in 1278, and according to M. Sovadina, he probably died in battle. Čeněk of Oybin first appears in sources in 1290 and Henry of Lipá in 1296.)
