= Hynce Ptáček of Pirkštejn =

Bohemian nobleman (1404–1444)

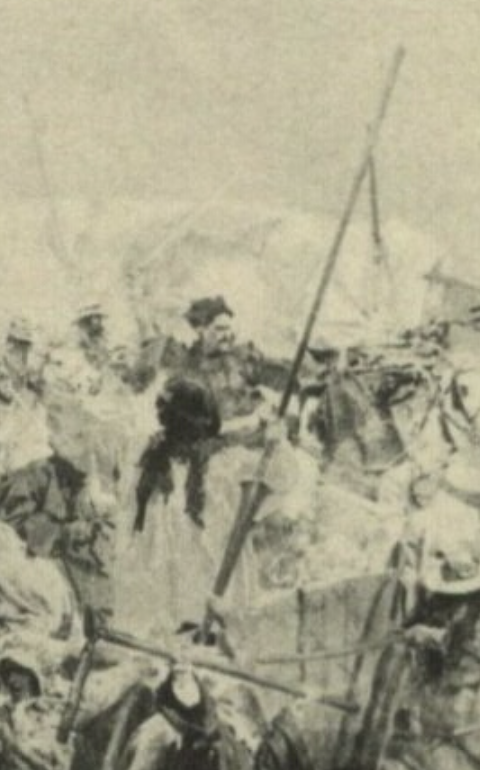
- Detail of Hynek from Luděk Marold's Bitva u Lipan (1898)

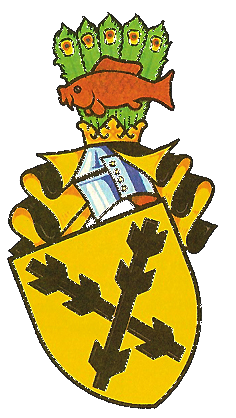
- Coat of arms
- Born: 1404
- Died: 27 August 1444 (aged 39–40); Rataje nad Sázavou
- Buried: St. Matthew's Church in Rataje nad Sázavou
- Noble family: Pirkštejn family
- Father: Jan Ptáček of Pirkštejn

Hynce Ptáček of Pirkštejn (Note: The first name Hynce is the Czech version of the German name Heinrich, and may also be rendered as Hynek or Hyncík. The family name Pirkštejn may be rendered as Pirkstein, Pirkenstein, Birkenstein, Pürkstein or Bürgstein.) (1404 – 27 August 1444) was a Czech nobleman, the Supreme Hofmeister of the Kingdom of Bohemia, and an influential leader of the moderate Hussites.

== Family background ==
Hynce Ptáček's family, the House of Pirkštejn, was originally a side branch of the Lipé family, and the family seat was the Pirkštejn Castle in Rataje nad Sázavou. He was the son of Jan Ptáček of Pirkštejn and Jitka of Kunštát.

Since his mother was from the influential Kunštát-Poděbrady family, Hynce was a cousin of George of Poděbrady, the future King of Bohemia, and the two were long-time political allies.

== Hussite War ==
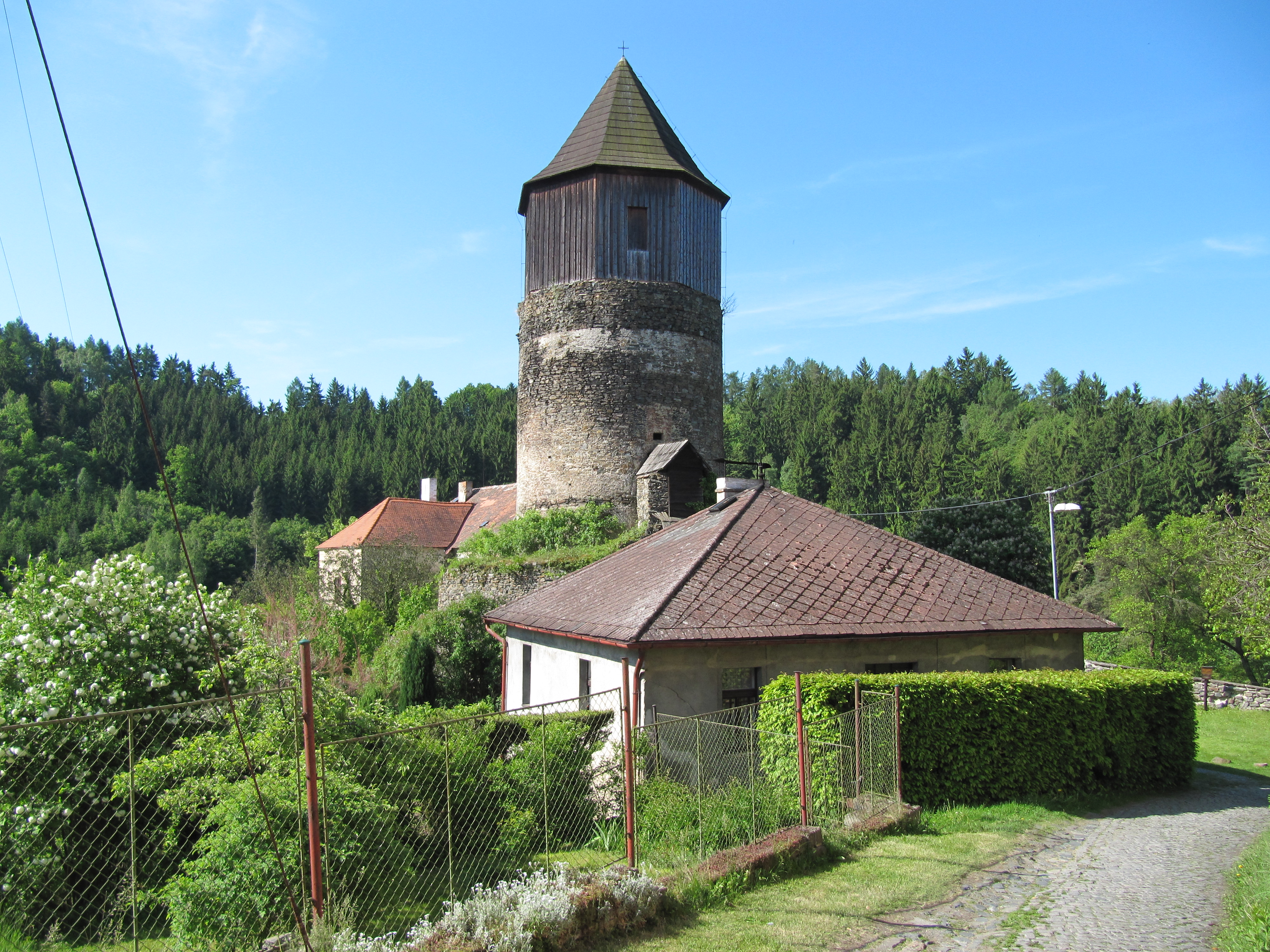
Pirkštejn Castle in Rataje nad Sázavou

Beginning in 1420, Hynce inherited the Pirkštejn family holdings in Rataje. He enjoyed a peaceful relationship with the Hussites, and the Hussite forces never besieged his castles in Rataje during the Hussite War. Hynce began to support the moderate Hussites (also known as the Utraquist Hussites) since 1427, and was selected in a delegation to defend the Four Prague Articles in Nuremberg in 1430.

In 1434, Hynce Ptáček, together with George of Poděbrady, joined the Utraquist-Catholic alliance; both fought on the side of the moderate Prague Hussites and defeated the radical Hussites in the Battle of Lipany. This put them on the winning side of the Hussite War.

== Under Sigismund of Luxembourg ==
Hynce rose through the ranks after the war, and was one of the eighteen noblemen electors who elected the Utraquist theologian Jan Rokycana as the Archbishop of Prague in 1435. Beginning in 1436, Hynce served as the Supreme Hofmeister of Bohemia, one of highest offices in the kingdom, under King Sigismund.

Many were dissatisfied with Sigismund's rule, who did not fully honor the agreement with the pro-Hussite Bohemians. Jan Roháč of Dubá, a leader of the radical Taborite Hussites and a follower of Jan Zizka, marched from Tábor and took control of the Sion Castle near Kutná Hora. Sigismund sent Hynce to besiege the castle in May 1437. Despite being a minor fortress held by a handful of fighters, Sion withstood a four-month siege before finally fell in September 1437; Jan Roháč was captured, tortured, and hanged in Prague.

Modern historians believe that Hynce intentionally dragged the siege to the last possible moment, since the siege was politically unpopular (many Bohemian nobles boycotted the siege and refused to join), and he repeatedly complained to Sigismund about the lack of money and troops, even though he lacked neither and had heavy artillery in his disposal. Hynce's force seemed only to begin to storm the castle after Sigismund's own Hungarian reinforcements, led by the ambitious Hungarian nobleman Michael Ország, arrived near the scene.

== Conflict with Albert II of Habsburg ==
After Sigismund's death in December 1437, many Utraquist Bohemian nobles, as well as the Queen Barbara of Cilli, opposed the election of Sigismund's son-in-law Albert II to King of Bohemia. Both Hynce and George of Poděbrady joined the anti-Albert party. Hynce successfully negotiated with the Polish Sejm and made Casimir IV Jagiellon of Poland a candidate for the Bohemian throne.

In May 1438, Hynce Ptáček and Jan Rokycana, now Archbishop of Prague, gathered the Utraquist nobilities in Kutná Hora and elected Casimir IV as the King of Bohemia. Albert II then marched into Bohemia with Saxonian and Hungarian troops in June 1438; the anti-Albert party failed to prevent his coronation as the King of Bohemia in Prague. His army eventually forced the Polish army to withdraw, and Hynce Ptáček made a truce with Albert II. However, Albert II unexpectedly died in 1439 after he returned to Hungary to campaign against the Turks.

== Role in the Interregnum ==
Albert II died without a male heir, which drove Bohemia into a period of interregnum known as the Post-Hussite Interregnum (1439-1453), during which the Kingdom lacked a central government, and many Bohemian nobles, knights, and royal cities organized into Landfriedens to maintain peace and order in the locality.

Hynce Ptáček emerged as one of the most influential Bohemian nobles during the interregnum. In January 1440, on the initiative of Hynce, the Bohemian Diet further ratified the Compacts of Basel and the result of Jan Rokycana's archbishopric election. The 1440 Diet was a successful political compromise between the Bohemian Hussites and the Catholics, and the Kingdom of Bohemia avoided another destructive civil war despite not having a king for thirteen years.

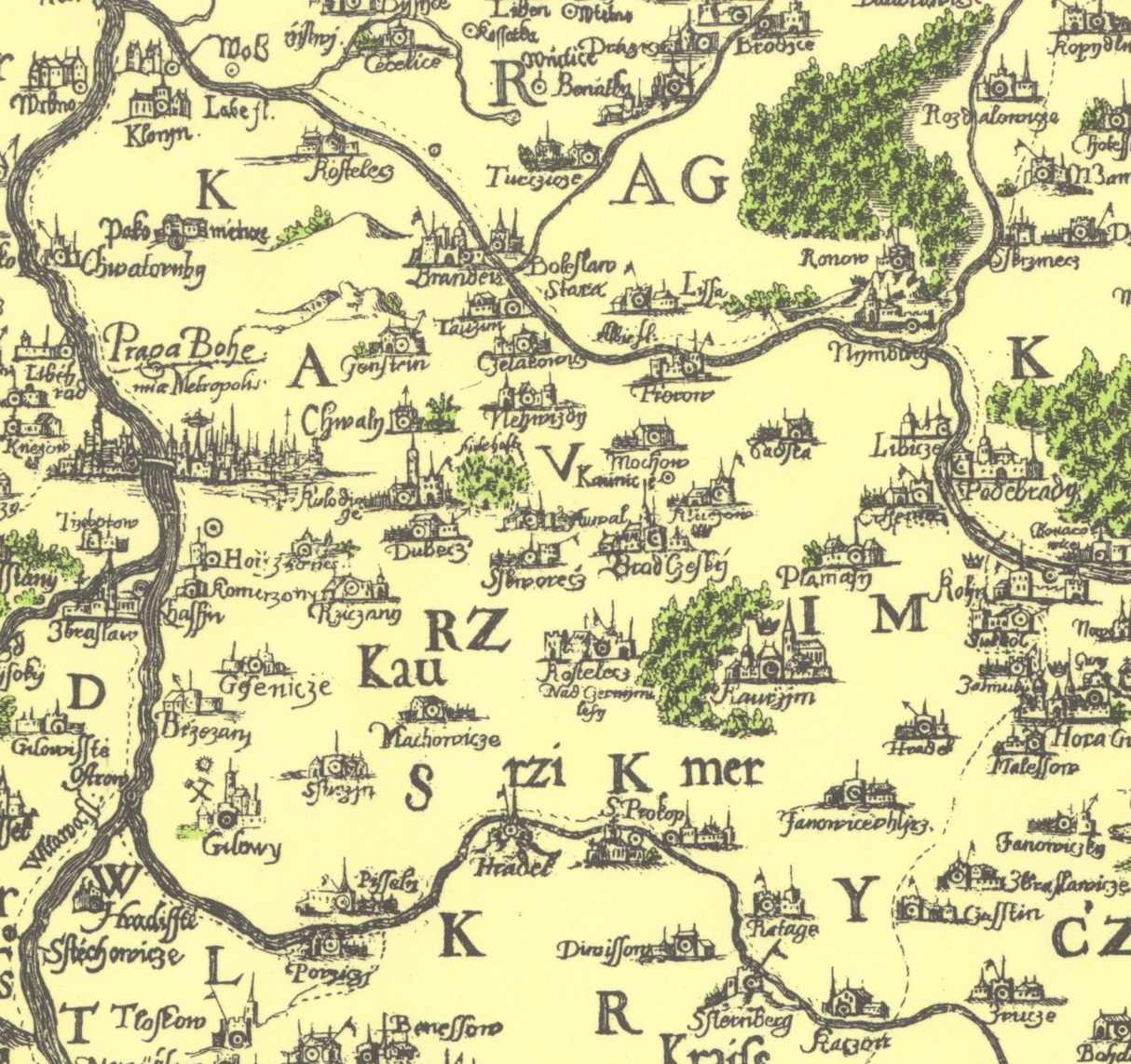
Map of the Kouřim Region (1619). Rataje (Ratage) is at the southern edge of the region.

In March 1440, Hynce established a pan-Eastern Bohemia Landfrieden with the nobles of the Kouřim, Čáslav, Hradecký, and Chrudim regions; all four regions are located to the east of Prague. Hynce himself was elected as the hetman of the Kouřim region, which includes his family seat in Rataje, as well as important royal cities of Kouřim, Český Brod, and Kolín. In 1441, Hynce commanded the combined Eastern Bohemia Landfrieden forces against the former Taborite hetman, Jan Kolda of Žampach, now an infamous robber baron.

As the de facto leader of the Eastern Bohemian alliance, Hynce became one of the most powerful lords in the Bohemian realm and the political leader of the Utraquist Hussites. His contemporaries referred to him as východočeský král or "the King of Eastern Bohemia"; in comparison, the powerful leader of the Catholic nobles and an opponent of Hynce, Oldřich II of Rosenberg, was nicknamed "the King of Southern Bohemia".

From 1440 to 1444, Hynce Ptáček tried to elect a new king and end the anarchy in Bohemia. He organized the Bohemian Diet to invite Albert III of Bavaria, and then Frederick III Habsburg, to accept the Bohemia throne, although both eventually declined the offer after negotiations failed. In addition, Oldřich of Rosenberg also opposed Frederick III's candidacy; he boycotted the Bohemian Diet in January 1443, and Hynce openly criticized Oldřich's party in the Diet in January 1444.

Hynce was more successful in strengthening the moderate Hussites into one alliance, and laid the groundwork of the post-war Hussite unity. He helped to reconcile Jan Rokycana with Jan Příbram, another influential Hussite theologian. He also managed to convince the Bohemian Diet to approve the theological positions of Jan Rokycana and condemn Mikuláš of Pelhřimov's Taborite teachings in January 1444.

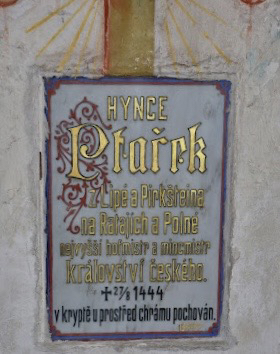
Memorial Plaque of Hynce Ptáček of Pirkštejn

After suddenly falling ill (possibly had a stroke), Hynce Ptáček died on 27 August 1444 in Rataje, and was buried in the St. Matthew's Church. His memorial plaque remained in the church to this day. The leadership of the Eastern Bohemian Hussite alliance passed to his cousin and ally, George of Poděbrady, who would eventually become the King of Bohemia in 1458.

== Marriage and issue ==
Hynce Ptáček married Anne of Neuhaus (d. 1452), daughter of the Chief Mint-Master Oldřich Vavák of Hradec of Kutná Hora. He had a daughter, Margaret of Pirkštejn, who married to Victor, Duke of Münsterberg, the second son of George of Poděbrady, in 1463. The House of Pirkštejn ended with his daughter.

== Bibliography ==
- ŠANDERA, Martin. Hynce Ptáček z Pikrštejna – opomíjený vítěz husitské revoluce. Prague: Vyšehrad, 2011.
- ŠMAHEL, František. Husitská revoluce. 3. Kronika válečných let. Prague: Karolinum, 1996.
- PALACKÝ, František. Dějiny národu českého v Čechách a v Moravě. Prague: Kočí, 1907.
- PRCHAL, Jan. Biografický slovník Polenska. Polná: Linda, 2002.
- Ze zpráv a kronik doby husitské. Prague: Svoboda, 1981.
