= Ferdinand Břetislav Mikovec =

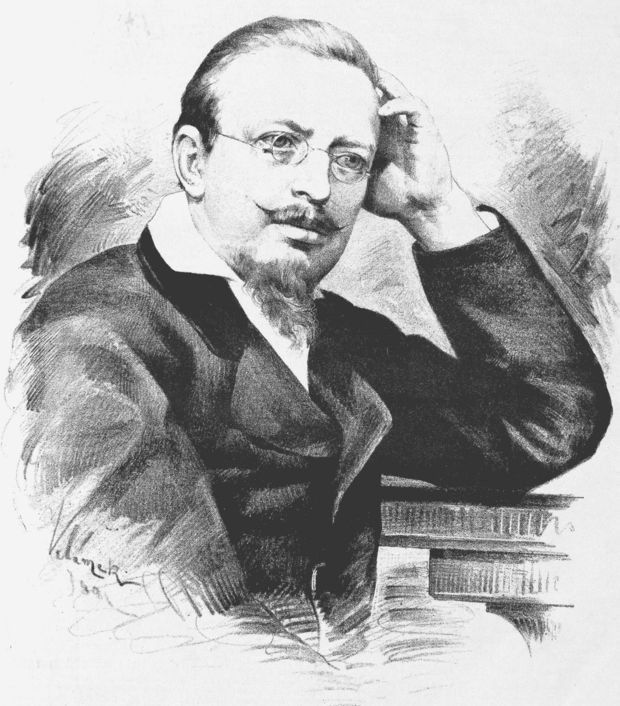
- Portrait of Mikovec by Jan Vilímek
- Born: 14 December 1826; Sloup v Čechách, Bohemia, Austrian Empire
- Died: 22 September 1862 (aged 35); Prague, Bohemia, Austrian Empire
- Education: Charles University
- Occupations: Writer, publisher, historian, theatre critic, nationalist

Ferdinand Břetislav Mikovec (14 December 1826 – 22 September 1862) was a Czech writer, publisher, historian, theatre critic and nationalist.

== Life and work ==
Mikovec was born on 14 December 1826 in Sloup v Čechách in Bohemia, Austrian Empire (now the Czech Republic). His father was the administrator of a manor house. After attending primary school in Česká Lípa, he went to Prague in 1842 to study philosophy at the Charles University, but he left the studies unfinished.

Although he had been raised in a German-speaking environment, he became interested in Czech history and the Czech National Revival. In 1848, he was deeply involved in the Revolution and was forced to flee to Zagreb when it was suppressed. When it was safe to travel, he went to Leipzig, where he studied the life of Jan Hus.

In 1851, he was able to return to Prague and established the literary magazine, Lumír. He would occasionally provide copies of works by Czech artists to his readers, as a bonus. He also contributed to the completion of St. Vitus Cathedral, published a monograph on Karlštejn Castle, and initiated the creation of an art and literary association known as "Arkadia". He became its first Chairman and organized an exhibition of Czech art, which took place in 1861. Today, he is largely remembered for his efforts to establish a Czech national theatre; writing criticism and dramas and serving on the committee for the construction of the National Theatre.

Mikovec suffered from a congenital heart defect, which worsened in 1862. His mother came to help nurse him through his illness, but he died of it a few months later. A major work on Czech monuments was left unfinished. In 1911, when the cemetery where he was interred was demolished, his remains were returned to his hometown.
