= Lumír =

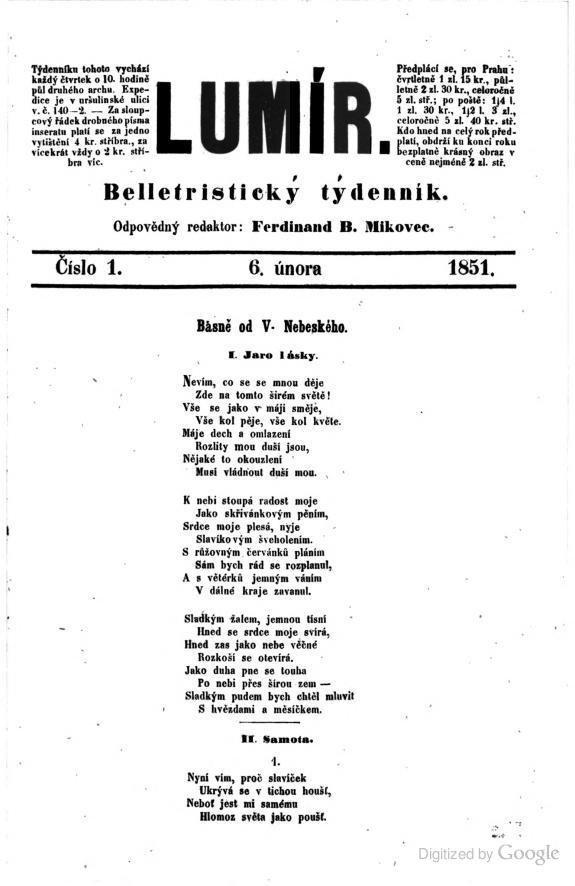
The first issue of Lumír 1851

Lumír is a weekly literary magazine that was established in 1851 by Ferdinand Břetislav Mikovec. It was the focal point of the neo-romantic nationalist poet Jaroslav Vrchlický and his Ossianic followers. Lumír is the name of a bard in Czech legend.

The magazine's followers were known by the same name as the magazine. The writers and artists involved started a new direction in Czech culture. Previously culture was seen as coming from Germans and sources in German. German poets like Heinrich Heine were translated poem by poem from German to Czech. With the emergence of the Lumir group, the focus of the work of writers like Vrchlický, Viktor Dyk and Julius Zeyer turned towards Latin roots and the Anglo Saxon countries in particular. This cultural focus is said to have led other Czech intellectuals to also look in the same direction for scientific, economic and social ideas.
