= Sloup Castle =

Castle in the Czech Republic

Sloup
- Sloup v Čechách, Liberec Region
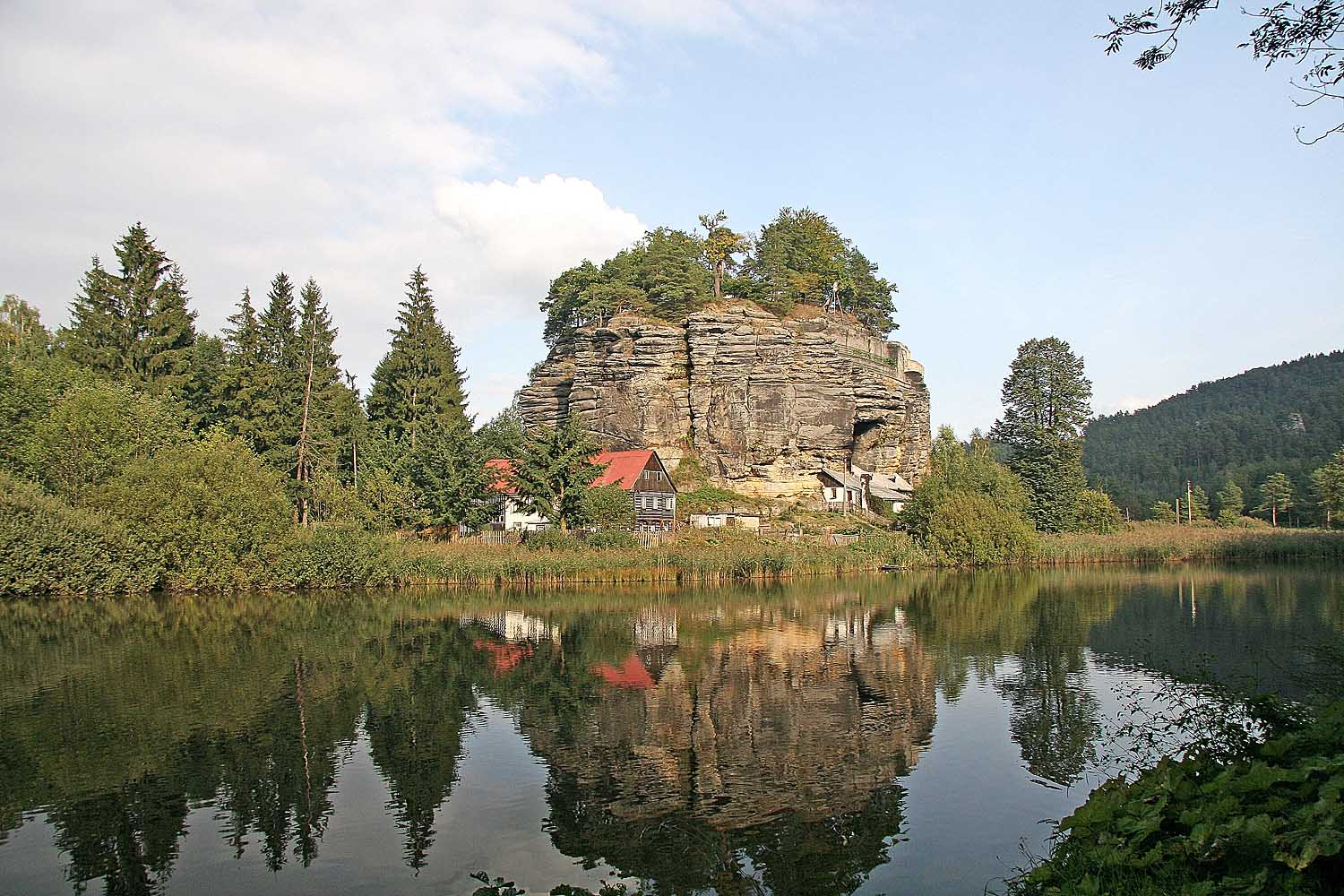
- View across the Hradní Pond

Site information
- Type: Fort

Location
- Location in the Czech Republic
- Coordinates: 50°44′9″N 14°34′51″E

Site history
- Built: 1324

Sloup Castle (Czech: Perkenstein or Pirkštejn; German: Einsiedlerstein or Bürgstein) is a rock castle in the municipality of Sloup v Čechách in the Liberec Region of the Czech Republic.

== Etymology ==
It takes its name from the special appearance of the freestanding 35-metre (115 ft) high sandstone rocks (its name literally means "column"), into which it was carved in the 14th century.

== History ==
The castle was first mentioned in records dating from 1324 owned by Čeněk of Ojvína. It was established beside a salt trade route from Meissen to Česká Lípa by the Ronovec family. The edges of the outcrop, which was a level summit, were carved to resemble castle walls with loopholes, and some of the gullies in the outcrop were filled in with masonry. Thanks to an ingenious system of trenches it was possible to flood the area around the rocks. The combination of natural conditions and human ingenuity turned the castle into a fortress unassailable by medieval warriors.

During the 15th century, Knight Mikeš Pancíř of Smojno was based here and launched a raid on Lužice, and as a consequence the castle was besieged in 1445–45. When the starving troops capitulated after three months of isolation it was burned down by the end of 1447. The castle was repaired, but it gradually ceased to meet the desired standards of comfort, and during the 16th century it was deserted and became dilapidated.

In 1639, the Swedes burned it down, and the castle became a ruin. From 1670 to 1785 hermits were based here, making use of the rock for their needs. Among other things, they carved out new rooms and created recesses for the Stations of the Cross, built a chapel in the rock and formed a new entrance. Historical documents talk about several men: Konstantin was a bricklayer; Vaclav painted a solar clock on the wall; and an optician and gardener called Samuel grew corn on the plains around the castle, as well as wine on its southern terraces.

After the hermitage ceased to exist the state owners, the Kinsky family, turned the complex into a romantic tourist attraction. Little has been preserved of the original structure on the elevated plateau, although the spaces sunk into the rock can be clearly seen today like the dungeon, well, hermitage, passage and the terraced walkways. In the former prison, dungeon carvings have been preserved, which were dug out of the walls by former prisoners. Sloup has now become a romantic place for outings and occasionally candlelit concerts and historical jousting matches are held.

== See also ==
- List of castles in the Liberec Region
- Macocha
