= Polná =

- Town
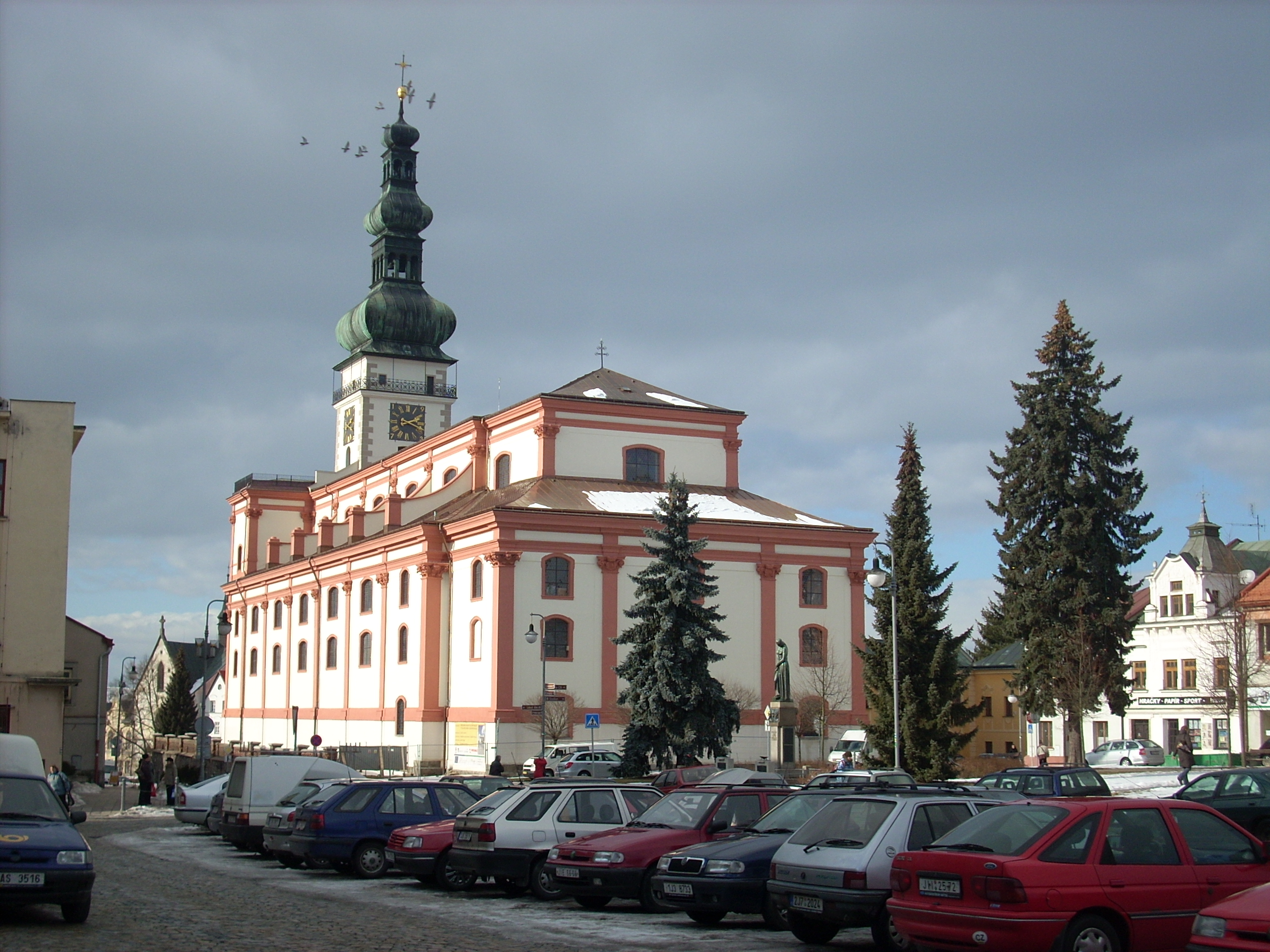
- Church of the Assumption of the Virgin Mary

- Flag Coat of arms

- Location in the Czech Republic
- Coordinates: 49°29′13″N 15°43′8″E
- Country: Czech Republic
- Region: Vysočina
- District: Jihlava
- First mentioned: 1242

Government
  - Mayor: Martin Bohdálek

Area
  - Total: 37.77 km^{2} (14.58 sq mi)
- Elevation: 490 m (1,610 ft)

Population (2026-01-01)
  - Total: 5,305
  - Density: 140.5/km^{2} (363.8/sq mi)
- Time zone: UTC+1 (CET)
  - Summer (DST): UTC+2 (CEST)
- Postal code: 588 13
- Website: www.mesto-polna.cz

Polná (Czech pronunciation: [ˈpolnaː]) is a town in Jihlava District in the Vysočina Region of the Czech Republic. It has about 5,300 inhabitants. The town is located on the Šlapanka River in the Upper Sázava Hills.

Polná was founded in the second half of the 12th century. The historic town centre is well preserved and is protected as an urban monument zone. The main landmarks of the town are the Polná Castle and the Church of the Assumption of the Virgin Mary.

== Administrative division ==
Polná consists of five municipal parts (in brackets population according to the 2021 census):

- Polná (4,472)
- Hrbov (278)
- Janovice (171)
- Nové Dvory (148)
- Skrýšov (20)

== Etymology ==
The name was most likely derived from the Czech word pole, i.e. 'field'.

== Geography ==
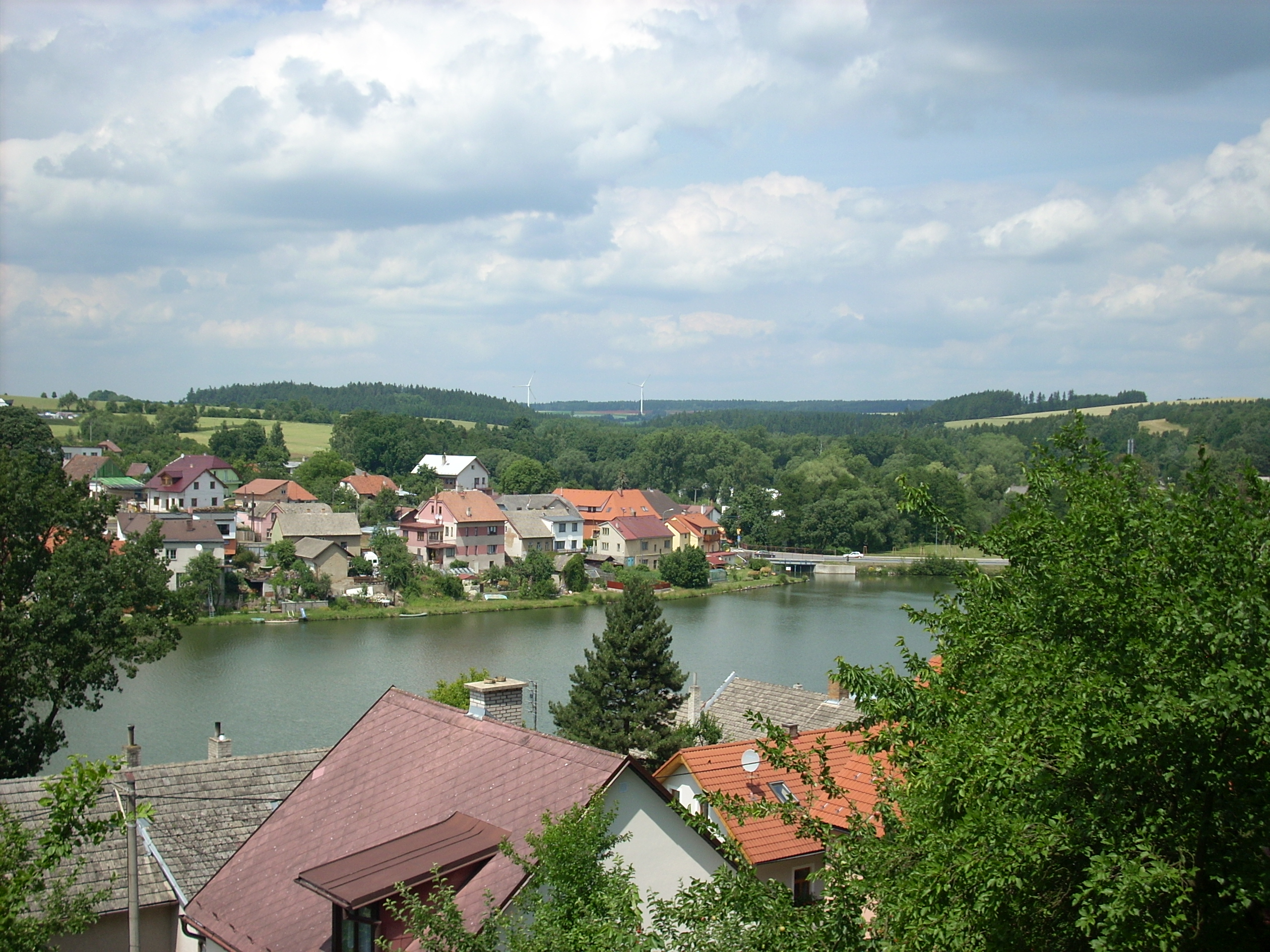
Peklo Pond

Polná is located about 13 kilometres (8 mi) northeast of Jihlava. It lies in the Upper Sázava Hills. The highest point is at 681 m (2,234 ft) above sea level. The town is situated at the confluence of the Šlapanka River and the stream Ochozský potok.

The territory of Polná is rich in fishponds. The largest of them is Peklo, located next to the historic town centre. It was founded in 1479–1482 and has an area of 16 ha (40 acres).

== History ==
=== Middle Ages ===
Founded in the second half of the 12th century, the first written mention of Polná is from 1242. At that time, there was already a church in Polná. Originally, Polná was a forest collier settlement, and not far from it there was built a castle called Polná, originally Polmna. The town lies on the line between two historic Czech lands – Bohemia and Moravia, therefore the town became an important mercantil and tactical point.

Polná became the centre of the Polná (later Polná-Přibyslav) estate. During its existence, for most of the time, Polná was part of significant aristocrat families' property. After the Lords of Polná, the lords of Lipá owned the town. From the half of the 14th century, Polná was owned by the Lords of Pirkenštejn. During the Hussite Wars, Hynce Ptáček of Pirkštejn, a hussite nobleman, ruled over Polná and bought also the nearby town of Přibyslav. Victor, son of King George of Poděbrady who bestowed Polná significant town rights and the coat of arms, got Polná by marriage with Žofie Ptáčková (daughter of Hynce Ptáček).

=== 15th–18th centuries ===
In the 15th century, the Trčkas of Lípa owned the town followed by the Waldstein family, Lords of Hradec and the Žejdlic of Šenfeld family. In 1623, Rudolf Žejdlic's property was confiscated because of his revolt against the Emperor Ferdinand II. All the estate was bought by cardinal Franz von Dietrichstein who changed the town's privileges and the coat of arms. Polná belonged to the property of the Dietrichstein family for almost 300 years.

In the 17th century a Jewish community settled in Polná. The Jewish quarter was established in 1681.

In 1794, the rebuilt castle burned down and was never completely restored again.

=== 19th century ===
In the 19th century, Polná was the centre of Czech culture for large locality and formed a counterbalance to the German-speaking city of Jihlava. In the half of the 19th century, 6,500 people lived in Polná, which made it the third largest town in the Vysočina Region (after Jihlava and Třebíč).

In August 1863, a tragedy took place in Polná. A giant fire destroyed 189 houses and 456 families lost their homes. Many baroque and renaissance houses were ruined. Many people moved from the town. The fact that the Northwest Railway were built 6 kilometres far from Polná caused another economical decline of the town. The railway Dobronín–Polná was built in 1903, but since 1982 the passenger traffic does not carry on.

The most significant incident of the 19th century was the murder of 19-year-old Anežka Hrůzová in the Březina forest. A Polná Jew, Leopold Hilsner, was wrongfully accused of the crime. Tomáš Garrigue Masaryk, later the first president of Czechoslovakia, engaged himself in this so-called Hilsner affair.

== Demographics ==
Historical population

Year	Pop.	±%
1869	6,285	—
1880	6,388	+1.6%
1890	5,965	−6.6%
1900	6,062	+1.6%
1910	5,595	−7.7%

Year	Pop.	±%
1921	5,201	−7.0%
1930	5,106	−1.8%
1950	4,296	−15.9%
1961	4,739	+10.3%
1970	4,580	−3.4%

Year	Pop.	±%
1980	4,862	+6.2%
1991	4,691	−3.5%
2001	4,869	+3.8%
2011	5,100	+4.7%
2021	5,089	−0.2%

Source: Censuses

== Economy ==
Polná is a town with many medium-sized industries. Most important types of industries are wood-working industry and food industry (especially dairy products). The largest employers with headquarters in the town are Sapeli (manufacturer of doors) and TKZ Polná (manufacturer of building and furniture hardware).

== Transport ==
Despite the size of the town, there is no major road running through the territory, and the railway that starts here is unused. The town lies at the intersection of several second-class roads.

== Education ==
Polná is home to a Montessori secondary school and three primary schools. There is also one primary art school.

== Culture ==
Every second weekend in September, the so-called "carrot-bun funfair" (Czech: mrkvancová pouť) is organised in Polná.

== Sights ==
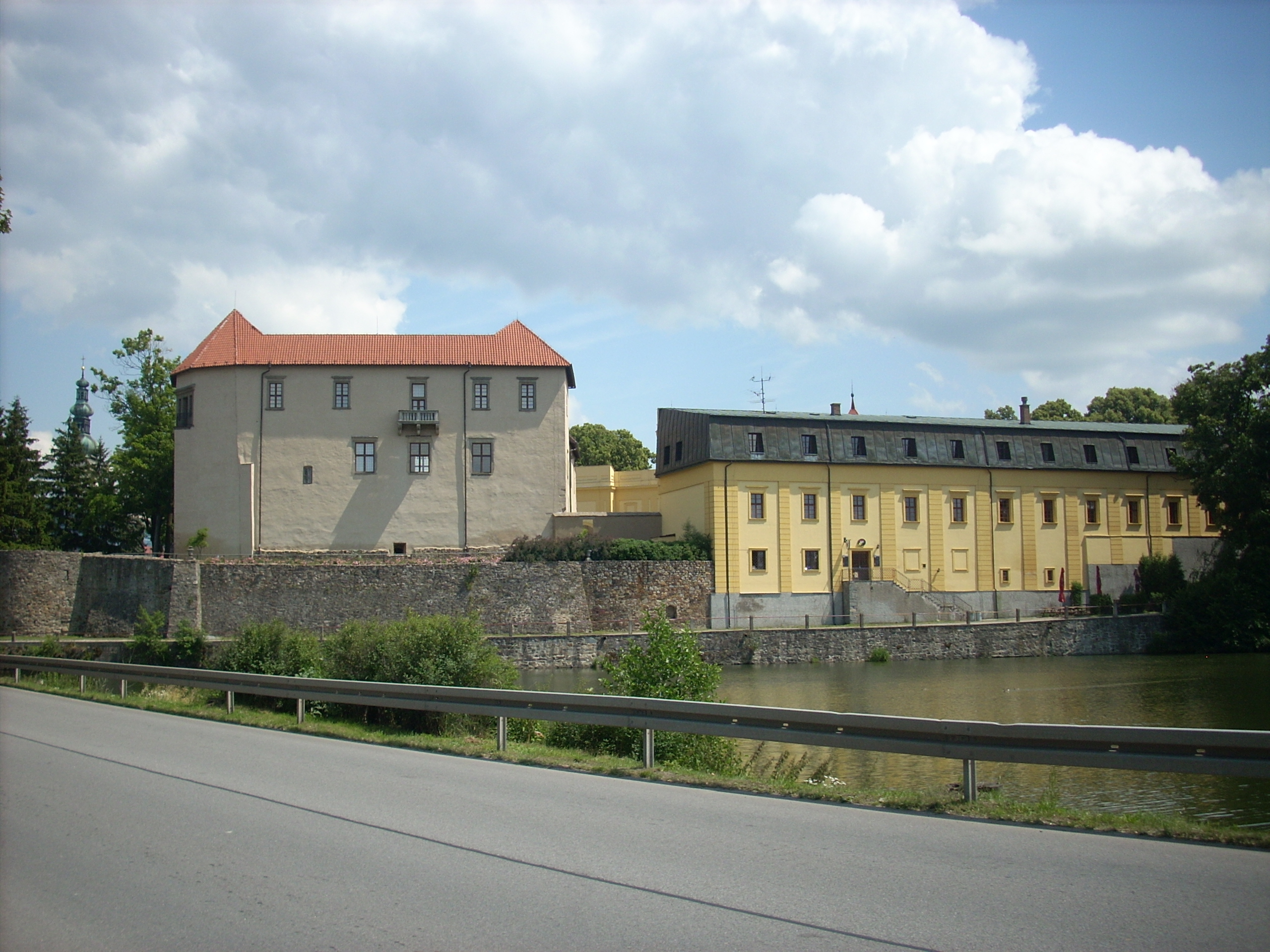
Polná Castle

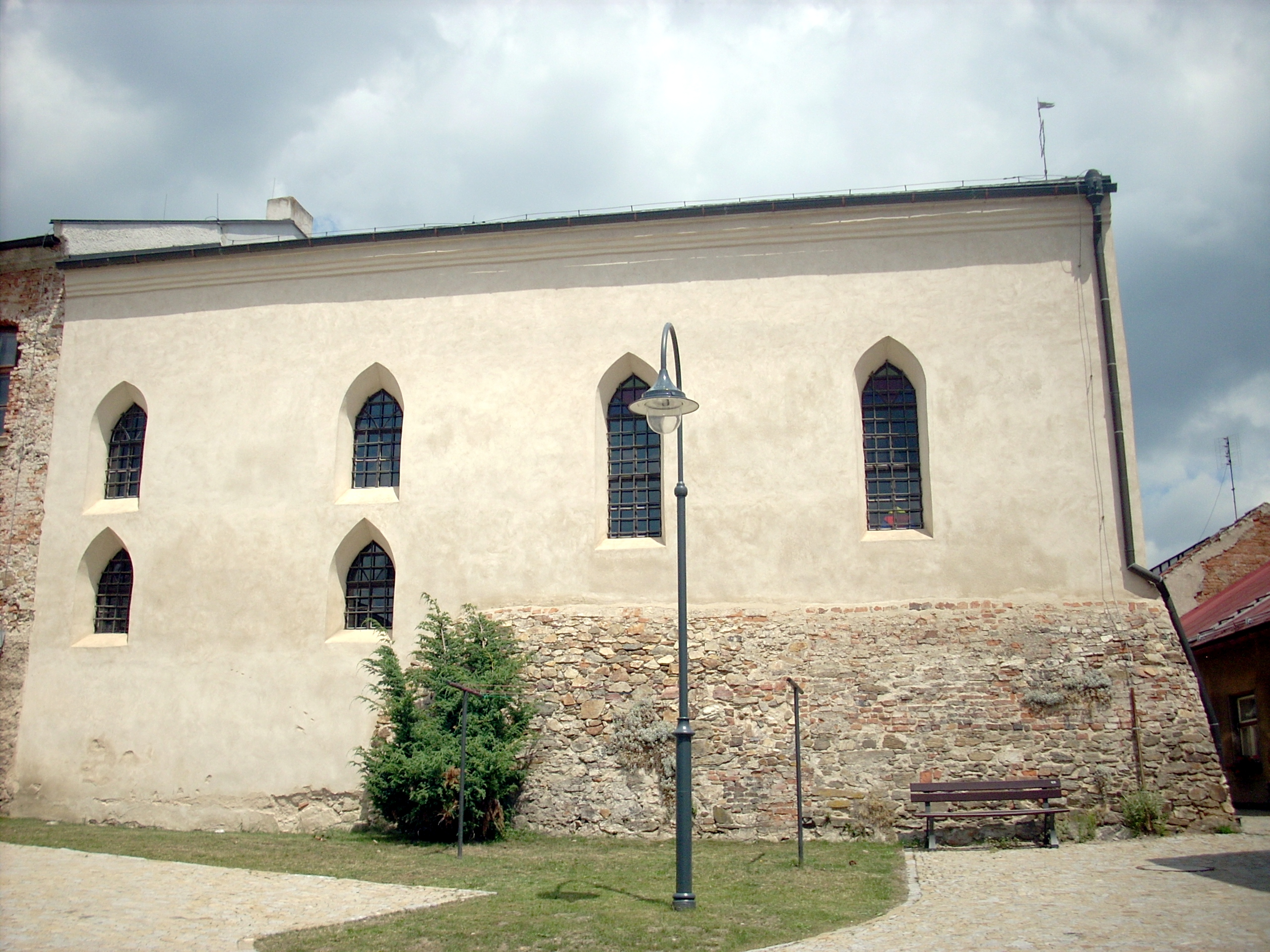
Former synagogue

Polná Castle was built in the late 12th or early 13th century and is among the oldest aristocratic castles in the country. It was rebuilt to a large Gothic castle. During the rule of Count Viktorin in 1479–1486, the castle rampart was extended and the fishpond Peklo next to the castle was created. After a fire in 1584, the castle was reconstructed and partially transformed into a Renaissance residence. During the Thirty Years' War, it was damaged by Swedish army. After a vast fire in 1794, some parts of it were not restored. In 1922–1926, the desotaled complex was partially reconstructed and museum exhibits were moved here. In 1953, it became a property of the town. Today the complex houses the Town Museum, a primary art school and a cultural centre.

The centre of the town is formed by the square Husovo náměstí. On the square there are deanery with the "Kaplanka" building (the former seat of the vicariate), Baroque Trinity Column and "Hastrmanka" fountain, colloquially called "Vodník" (water sprite).

The Church of Assumption of the Virgin Mary on the Husovo náměstí is the main landmark of Polná. It was built between 1700 and 1707. Author of the project was Italian builder Domenico D'Angeli. Inside the church there is a rich and valuable stucco and fresco decoration, or an organ by Jan David Sieber (the biggest preserved organ in the country manufactured in the Czech lands). The tower was destroyed by the 1863 fire and rebuilt in 1894. It is 64 metres (210 ft) high.

The Church of Saint Catherine is a cemetery church, built in 1378–1389 by lords of Pirkenštejn. In 1906–1910, fragments of wall frescoes from the 15th and 16th centuries were discovered. The second cemetery church in Polná is Church of Saint Barbara.

The Jewish community is commemorated by the former synagogue and Jewish cemetery, both founded in the late 17th century. Nowadays the synagogue houses the Regional Museum of Jewish Culture.

Klešter is a glen where an ancient merchant path from Moravia to Bohemia led. It is a unique technical monument of the Middle Ages. About 150 metres (490 ft) of the glen is preserved.

== Notable people ==
- Božena Němcová (1820–1862), writer; lived here in 1840–1842
- Bohumil Hrabal (1914–1997), writer; lived here in 1917–1919

== Twin towns – sister cities ==
Polná is twinned with:

- Wimmis, Switzerland
