= Pirkštejn Castle =

14th century castle in the Czech Republic

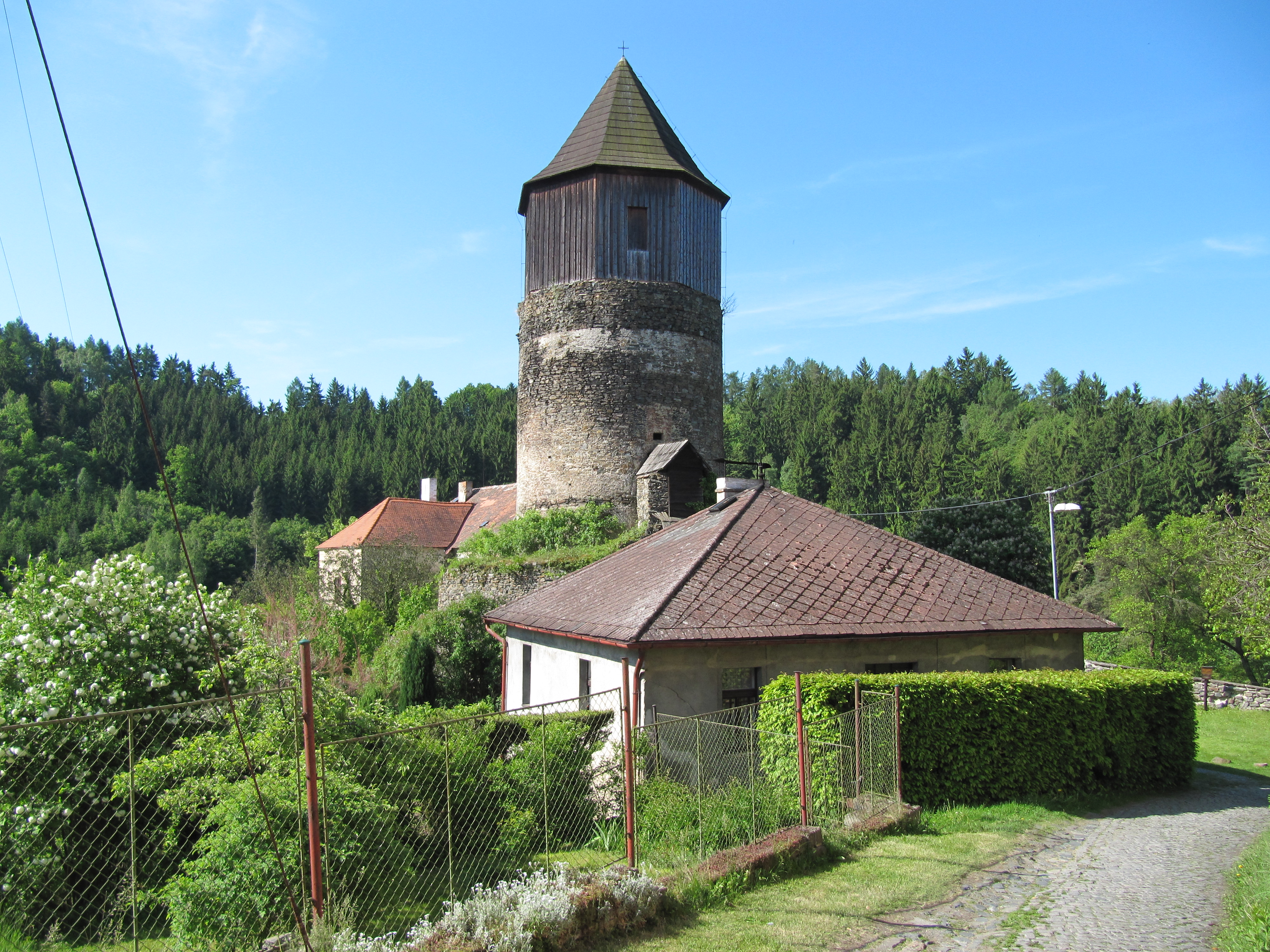
- Interactive map of Pirkštejn Castle
- 49°50′26″N 14°57′16″E

History
- Built: 14th century

Pirkštejn Castle (Czech: hrad Pirkštejn) is a castle in Rataje nad Sázavou in the Central Bohemian Region of the Czech Republic. The castle was built by Henry of Lipá in the early 14th century. The castle sustained damage from a peasant revolt in 1627.

In the 18th century, Pirkštejn Castle came under ownership of the church, and is still privately owned today. Extensive renovation efforts have occurred in recent years.
