= Sloup v Čechách =

- Municipality
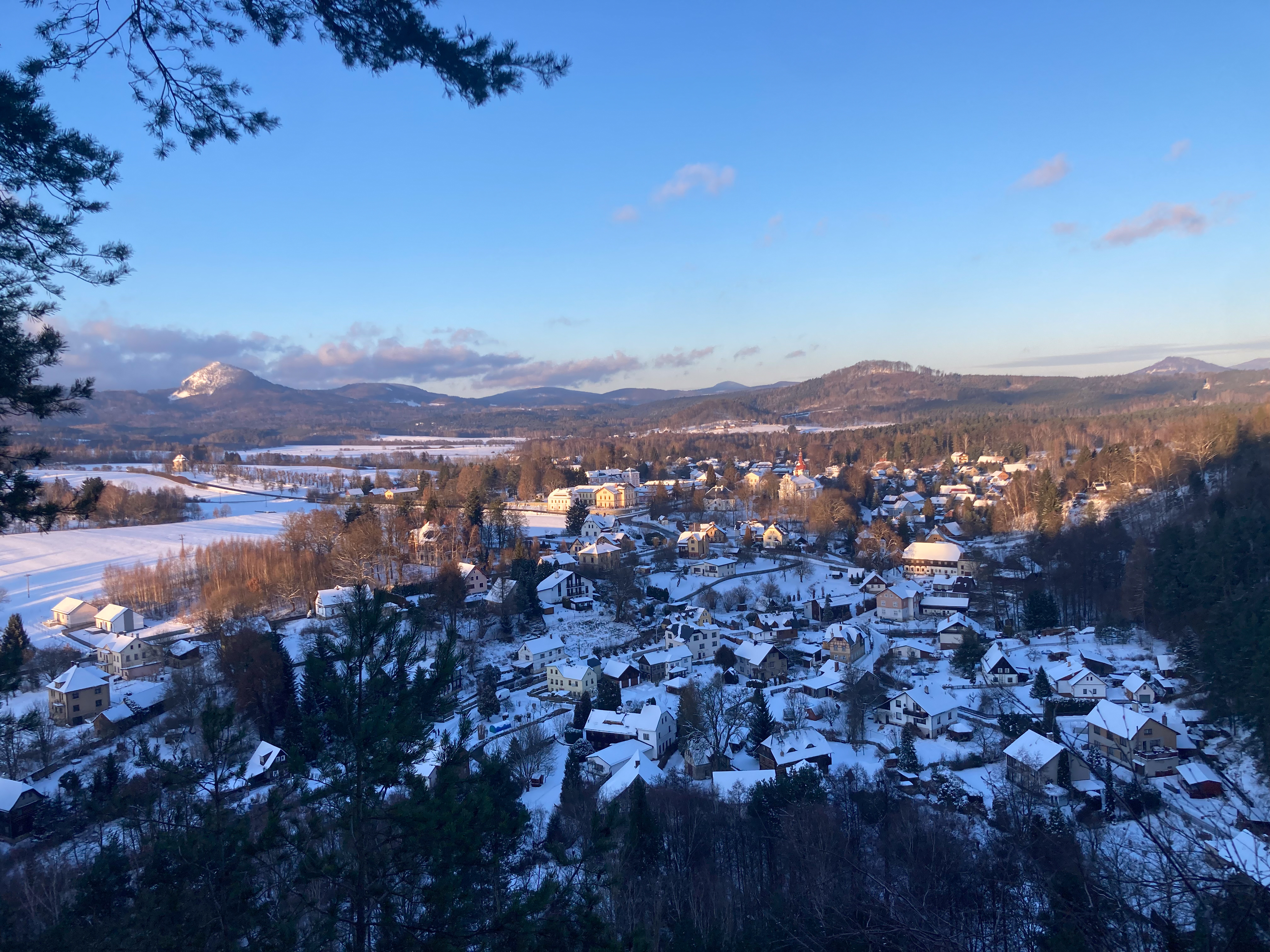
- View from the south

- Flag Coat of arms

- Location in the Czech Republic
- Coordinates: 50°44′20″N 14°35′20″E
- Country: Czech Republic
- Region: Liberec
- District: Česká Lípa
- First mentioned: 1318

Area
  - Total: 5.77 km^{2} (2.23 sq mi)
- Elevation: 292 m (958 ft)

Population (2026-01-01)
  - Total: 691
  - Density: 120/km^{2} (310/sq mi)
- Time zone: UTC+1 (CET)
  - Summer (DST): UTC+2 (CEST)
- Postal code: 471 52
- Website: www.obecsloupvcechach.cz

Sloup v Čechách (German: Bürgstein) is a municipality and village in Česká Lípa District in the Liberec Region of the Czech Republic. It has about 700 inhabitants. The area of the village is well preserved and is protected as a village monument zone.

== Etymology ==
The Czech word sloup means 'column'. It refers to the shape of the rock on which the castle was founded in the Middle Ages.

== Geography ==
Sloup v Čechách is located about 6 kilometres (4 mi) northeast of Česká Lípa and 32 km (20 mi) west of Liberec. It lies in the Ralsko Uplands. The highest point the hill Slavíček at 535 m (1,755 ft) above sea level. In the southern part of the municipal territory there is a sandstone rock town.

== History ==
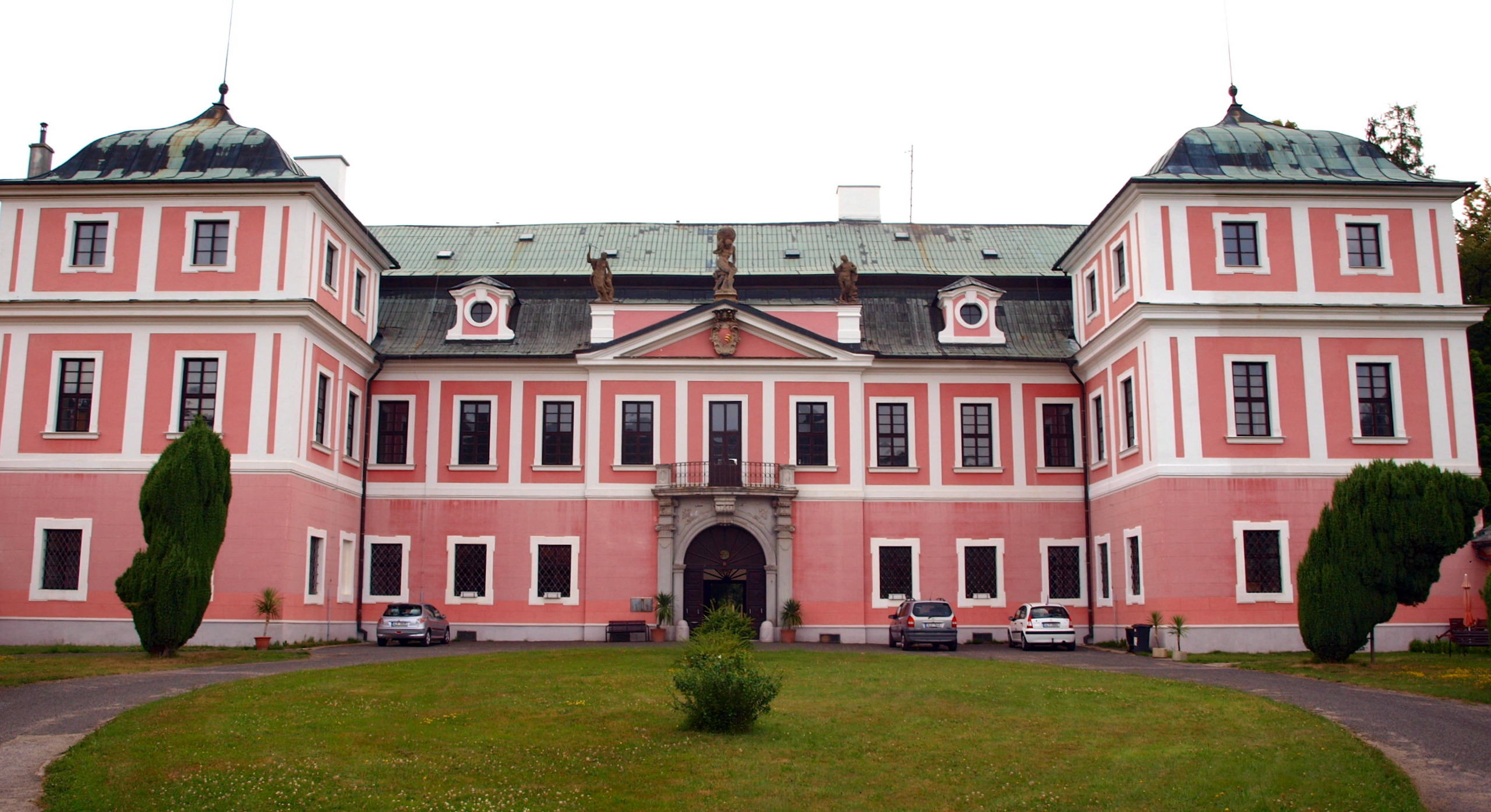
Sloup Chateau

The first written mention of Sloup v Čechách is from 1318. There was a customs office on an old trade route from Prague to Zittau. In 1595, the Berka of Dubá family had a new manor house built. The greatest development of the village occurred after 1726, during the rule of Count Josef Jan Maxmilián Kinsky, who turned the estate into an important centre of industry and craft.

From 1870, Sloup v Čechách became a holiday resort with a number of number of recreational facilities. After World War II, the German-speaking population was expelled. From 1981 to 1990, Sloup v Čechách was a municipal part of Nový Bor.

== Demographics ==
Historical population

Year	Pop.	±%
1869	1,211	—
1880	1,234	+1.9%
1890	1,226	−0.6%
1900	1,074	−12.4%
1910	1,085	+1.0%

Year	Pop.	±%
1921	1,092	+0.6%
1930	1,185	+8.5%
1950	655	−44.7%
1961	826	+26.1%
1970	723	−12.5%

Year	Pop.	±%
1980	776	+7.3%
1991	640	−17.5%
2001	701	+9.5%
2011	746	+6.4%
2021	724	−2.9%

Source: Censuses

== Transport ==
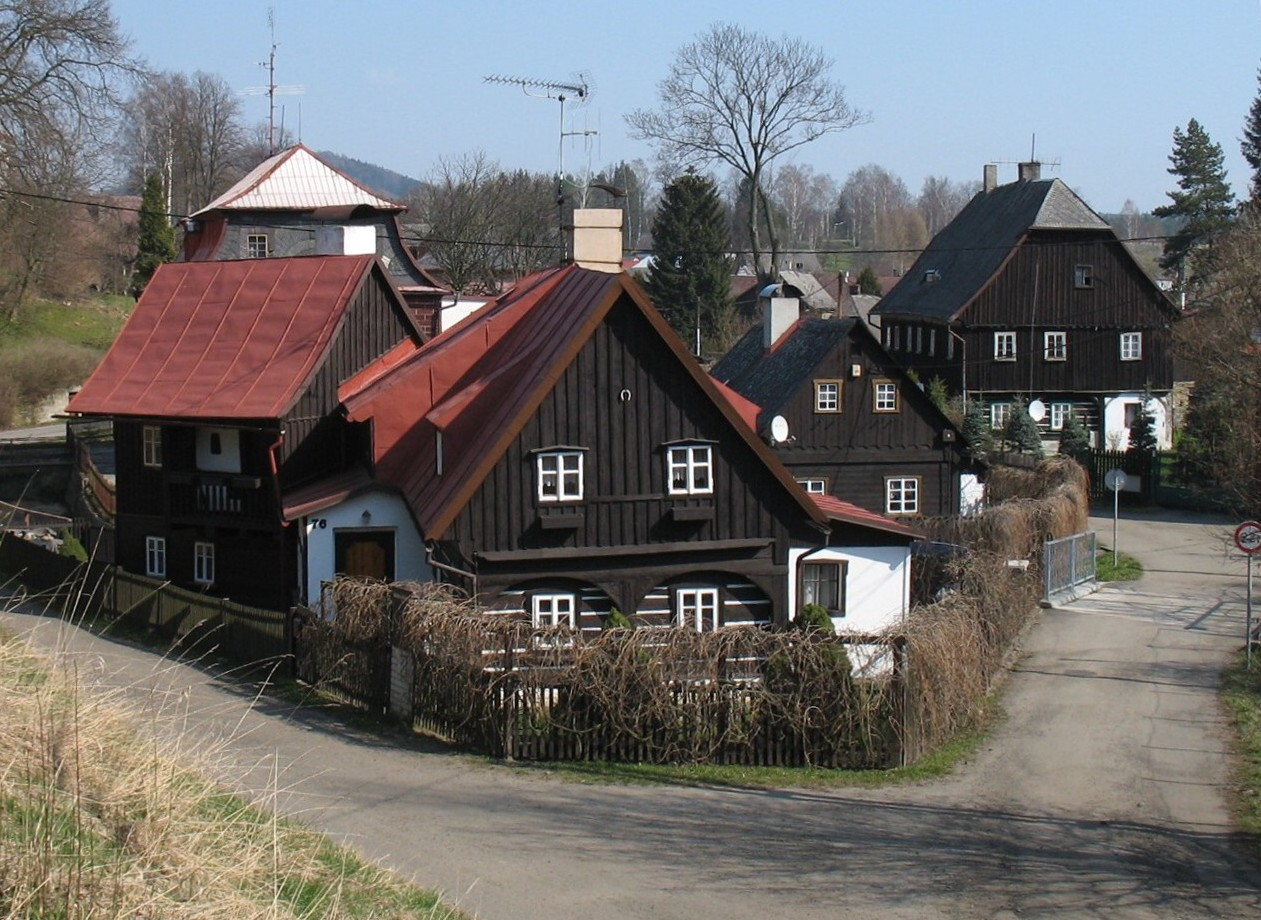
Folk architecture in the village

There are no railways or major roads passing through the municipality.

== Sights ==
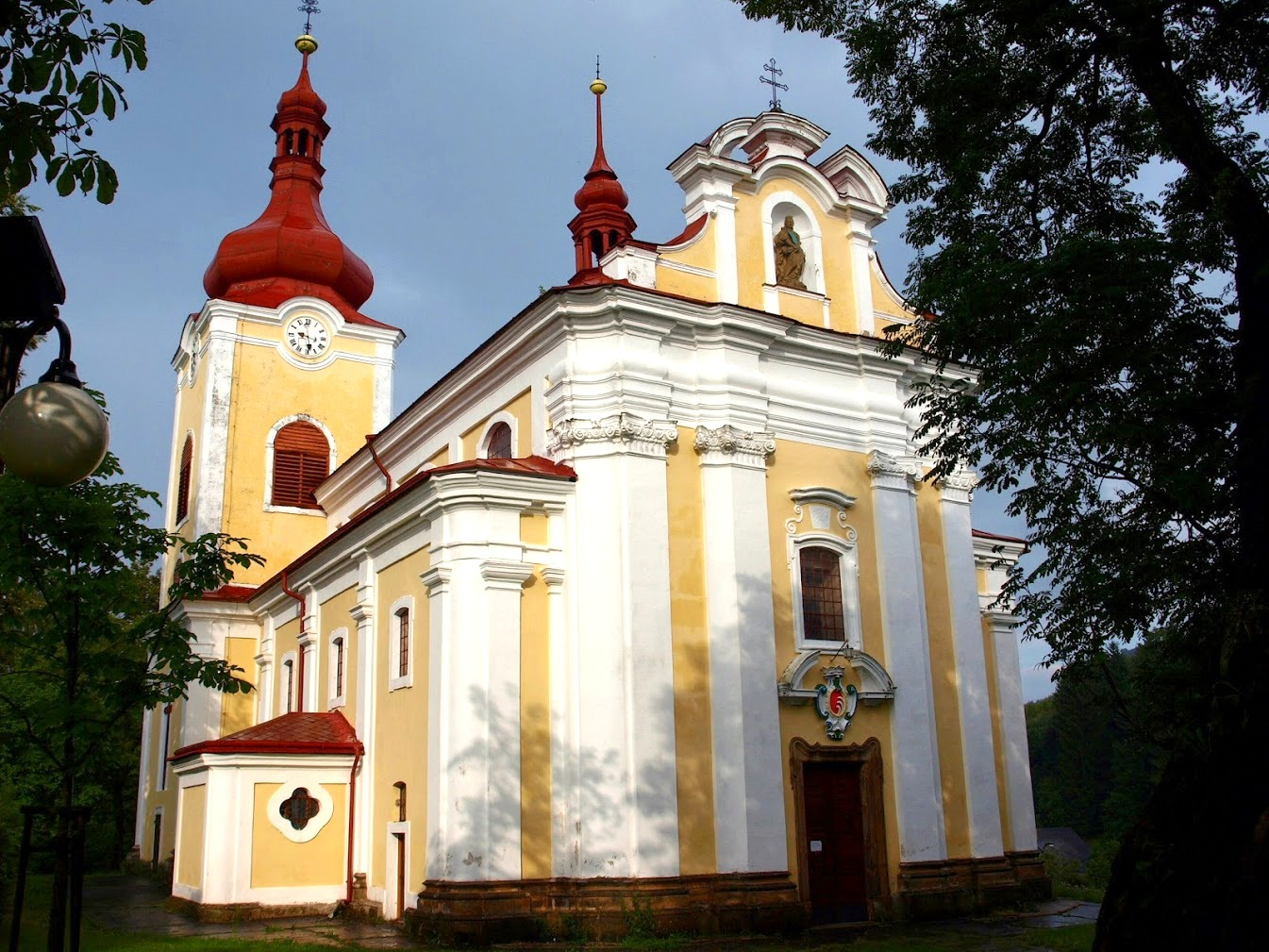
Church of Saint Catherine of Alexandria

Sloup v Čechách is known for the Sloup Castle. It is a rock castle on a 35 m (115 ft) high sandstone rock.

Sloup Chateau was built by Count Kinsky in the Baroque style in 1730–1733. Today the building serves as a retirement home.

The Church of Saint Catherine of Alexandria was originally built in the 14th century. The current church was built in 1707–1719. A Marian column from 1694 stands in front of the church.

There are many well-preserved half-timbered houses in the village.

== In popular culture ==
The 1985 fairytale film Give the Devil His Due was partly shot in the municipality.

== Notable people ==
- Ferdinand Břetislav Mikovec (1826–1862), writer and historian

== Twin towns – sister cities ==
Sloup v Čechách is twinned with:

- Stolpen, Germany
