= Petr Konopišťský of Šternberk =

Bohemian nobleman (c. 1385 – 1420)

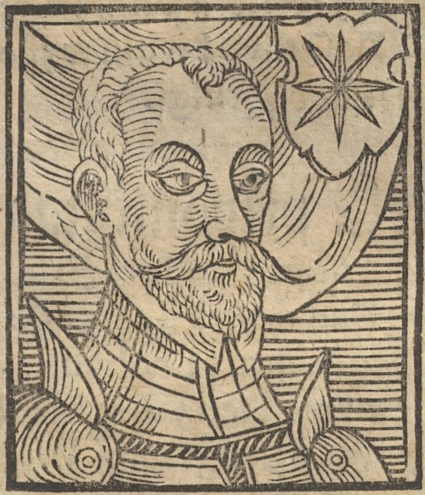

- Coat of arms
- Predecessor: Markvart or Zdeněk of Šternberk
- Successor: Zdeněk of Šternberk (c. 1420 – 1476)
- Born: c. 1385
- Died: 1 November 1420
- Wars and battles: Hussite Wars
- Noble family: Šternberk family
- Spouse: Perchta of Kravaře (m. 1415)

Petr Konopišťský of Šternberk (Czech: Petr Konopišťský ze Šternberka; c. 1385 – 1 November 1420) was a Bohemian nobleman who fought in the Hussite Wars as a member of the combined Catholic forces against the Hussites.

== Biography ==
Petr was born in Konopiště, Bohemia, likely around 1385, with conflicting parentage, either fathered by Markvart or Zdeněk of Šternberk. He married Perchta of Kravaře on 30 September 1415, at Český Šternberk. He had three children, Zdeněk, Petr, and Eliška. Petr managed both Konopiště and Český Šternberk during his life. He inherited control over both of these estates from his father and his uncle, Albert.

Initially a supporter of the Hussites, during the 1415 Council of Constance, Konopišťský sided with the Bohemian Catholic Nobility and remained loyal to the cause until his death. He engaged with Hussite forces in at least three battles, a battle at Poříčí nad Sázavou (19–20 May 1420) and Sudoměř (25 March 1420), and finally, Konopišťský died in the Battle of Vyšehrad on 1 November 1420.

Zdeněk and Petr divided Petr's estates between themselves after his death. Zdeněk received Konopiště, and Petr inherited Český Šternberk.
