= Rataje nad Sázavou =

- Market town
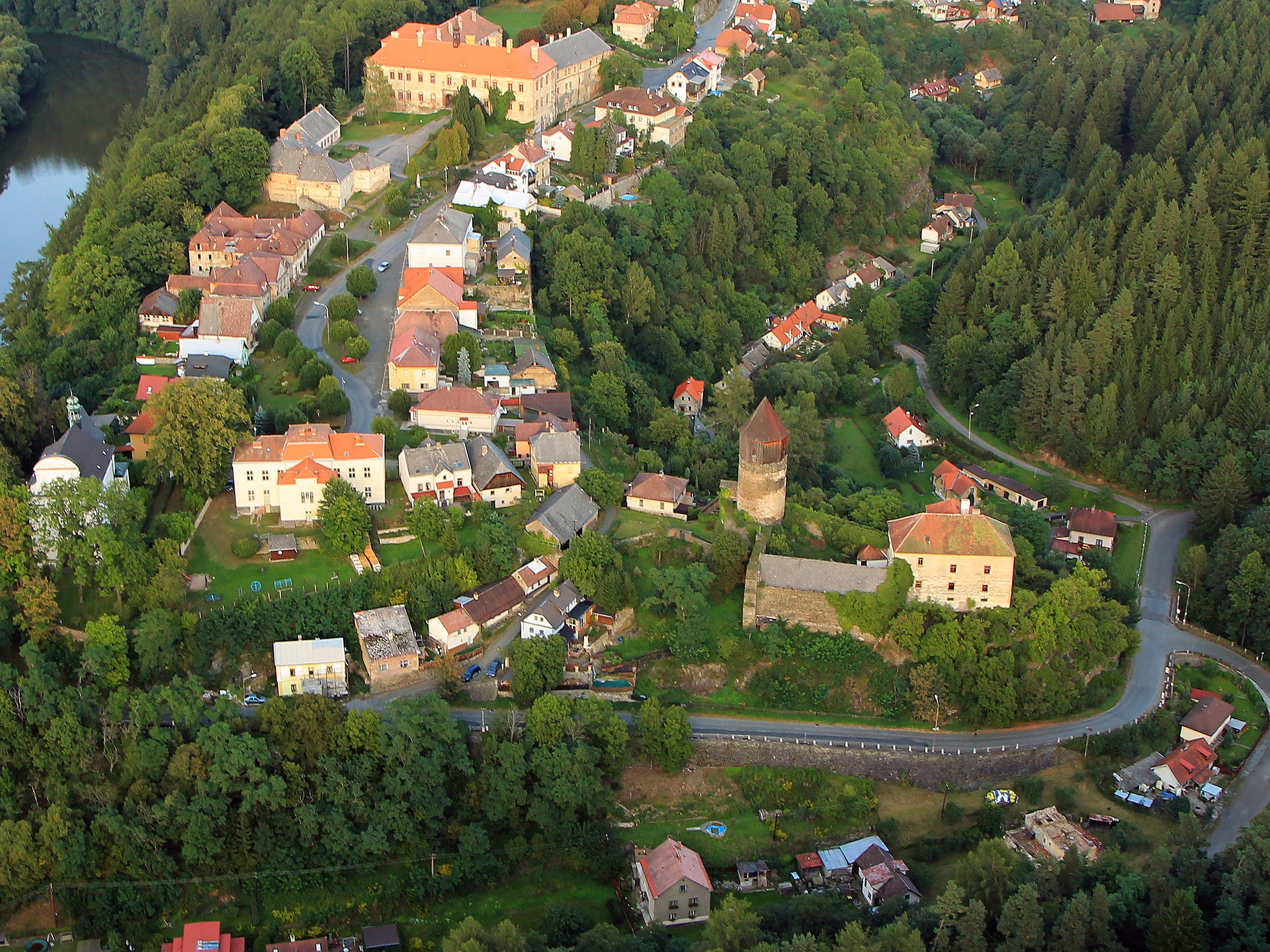
- Aerial view

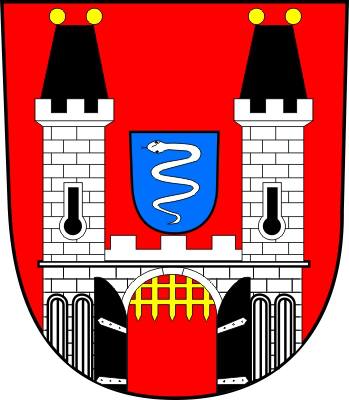
- Flag Coat of arms

- Location in the Czech Republic
- Coordinates: 49°50′45″N 14°57′47″E
- Country: Czech Republic
- Region: Central Bohemian
- District: Kutná Hora
- First mentioned: 1156

Area
  - Total: 13.31 km^{2} (5.14 sq mi)
- Elevation: 383 m (1,257 ft)

Population (2026-01-01)
  - Total: 560
  - Density: 42/km^{2} (110/sq mi)
- Time zone: UTC+1 (CET)
  - Summer (DST): UTC+2 (CEST)
- Postal code: 285 07
- Website: www.obecrataje.cz

Rataje nad Sázavou (Czech pronunciation: [ˈratajɛ ˈnat saːzavou]; German: Rattay, Ratais an der Sasau) is a market town in Kutná Hora District in the Central Bohemian Region of the Czech Republic. It has about 600 inhabitants. The historic town centre is well preserved and is protected as an urban monument zone.

== Administrative division ==
Rataje nad Sázavou consists of three municipal parts (in brackets population according to the 2021 census):

- Rataje nad Sázavou (428)
- Malovidy (44)
- Mirošovice (84)

== Etymology ==
The name Rataje is derived from the Old Czech word rataj, i.e. 'ploughman', 'farmer'.

== Geography ==
Rataje nad Sázavou is located 27 kilometres (17 mi) southwest of Kutná Hora and 39 km (24 mi) southeast of Prague. Most of the municipal territory lies in the Vlašim Uplands, only the eastern part lies in the Upper Sázava Hills. The highest point is at 480 m (1,575 ft) above sea level. The market town is situated on the right bank of the Sázava River, which forms the municipal border.

== History ==
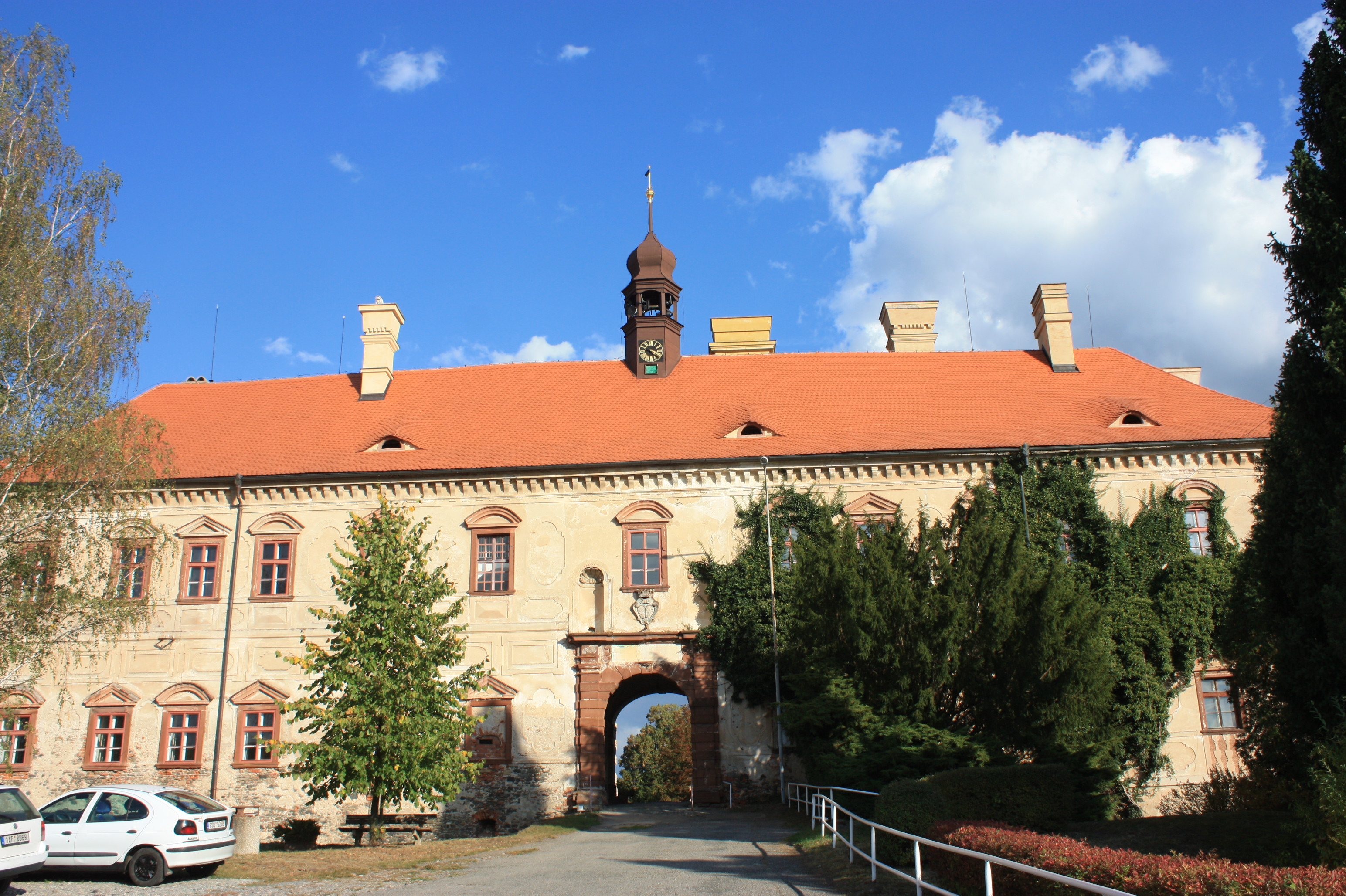
Rataje Castle

The first written mention of Rataje nad Sázavou is from 1156, when it was already a fortified market town. There are not any written reports about the exact date of its origin but it was probably around 946.

A castle, partly brick, partly wooden was founded on the place of the current castle in the middle of the 10th century. The castle was built as a border fortress of the Zlič region. This was evidenced when bronze and ceramic ornaments were found in 1890 when a road around the castle was built.

Rataje was rebuilt after a large fire in the middle of the 13th century and was the property of the king at that time. John of Bohemia gave Rataje to Henry of Lipá. The Lords of Lipá then built a lower castle called Pirkštejn. Hynce Ptáček of Pirkstein gained Rataje in 1420. He was the highest hofmeister and münzmeister of the Kingdom of Bohemia, an administrator of the royal towns including Kutna Hora and a guardian of the future king, George of Poděbrady. He is the most important holder of Rataje and is buried in the family tomb in the local church.

Many noble families owned Rataje later on. Ladislav, Václav and Jan of Malešice began reconstruction on the castle between 1531 and 1579. In 1656, Vilém František of Talmberk initiated reconstruction of the entire castle and his son František Maxmilián Leopold completed it. Later, Rataje was held by the Liechtenstein family from 1772 to 1919.

== Demographics ==
Historical population

Year	Pop.	±%
1869	1,223	—
1880	1,238	+1.2%
1890	1,245	+0.6%
1900	1,641	+31.8%
1910	1,184	−27.8%

Year	Pop.	±%
1921	1,164	−1.7%
1930	1,084	−6.9%
1950	970	−10.5%
1961	942	−2.9%
1970	935	−0.7%

Year	Pop.	±%
1980	740	−20.9%
1991	621	−16.1%
2001	583	−6.1%
2011	551	−5.5%
2021	556	+0.9%

Source: Censuses

== Transport ==
Rataje nad Sázavou is located on the railway lines Kolín–Ledečko and Ledeč nad Sázavou–Čerčany. The municipal territory is served by six railway stations: Rataje nad Sázavou, Rataje nad Sázavou předměstí, Rataje nad Sázavou zastávka, Rataje nad Sázavou-Ivaň, Mirošovice u Rataj nad Sázavou and Malovidy.

== Sights ==
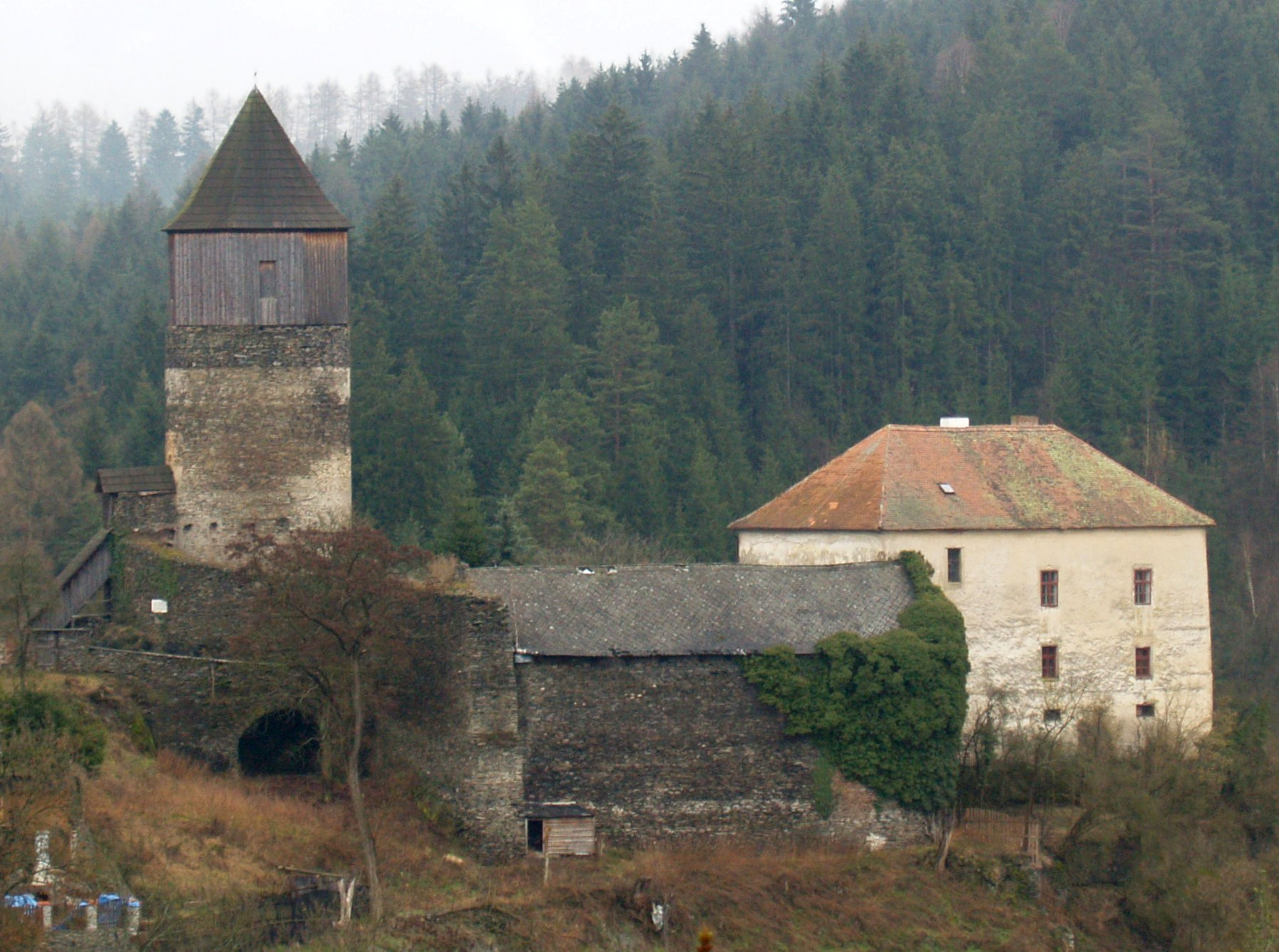
Pirkštejn Castle

Pirkštejn Castle was founded in the mid-14th century as a part of the town fortifications. Today it is owned by the church and is inaccessible to the public.

The municipality of Rataje bought Rataje Castle in 1933 and placed a municipal office, post office, police station and school there. Today it also houses the Museum of Central Posázaví.

The Church of Saint Matthew was built in the early Baroque style in 1675–1691 and has remained almost unchanged since then. It replaced a church from the 14th century.

== In popular culture ==
A recreation of the town as it existed in 1403 is featured in the Czech role-playing video game Kingdom Come: Deliverance.

== Notable people ==
- Jan Peka (1894–1985), ice hockey player
