= Johann Alexander Thiele =

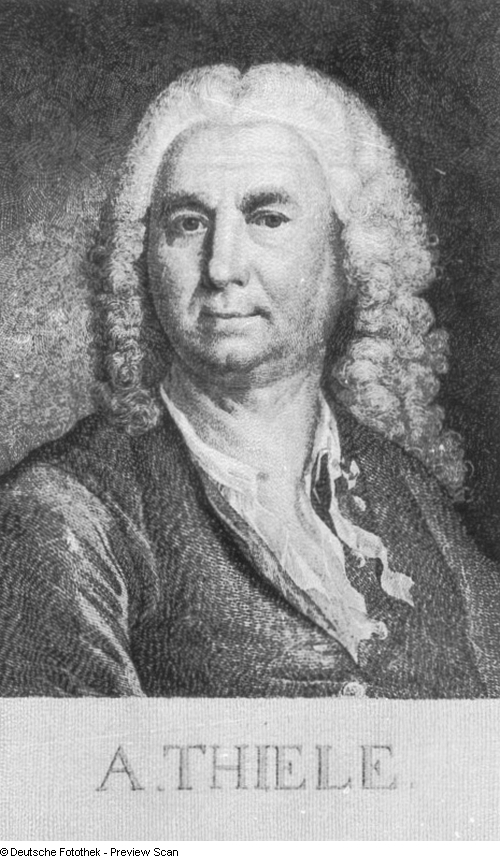
Johann Alexander Thiele (date unknown); portrait by Christian Gottlieb Geyser

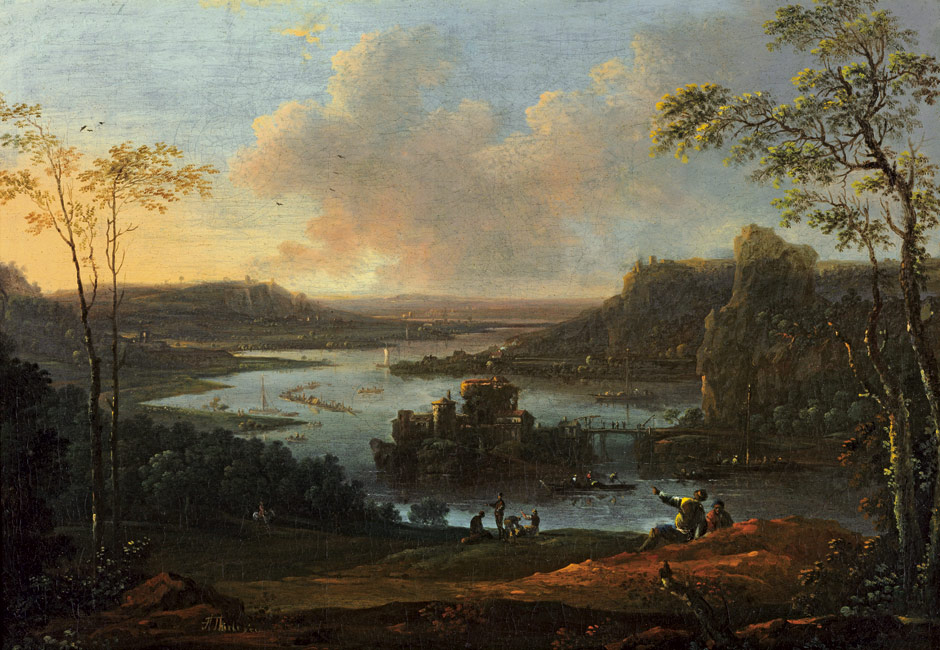
Fantastical Landscape Along the Elbe (c.1730)

Johann Alexander Thiele (26 March 1685 in Erfurt – 22 May 1752 in Dresden) was a German painter and engraver.

== Life and work ==
After five years of apprenticeship as a printer in Erfurt, he was married in Arnstadt in 1710 and moved to Dresden in 1715, where he copied old paintings, was a student of Christoph Ludwig Agricola and worked briefly with Adam Manyoki, although he remained largely an auto-didact. In 1722, he presented his paintings for the first time during a carnival held at the Zwinger Palace. Many of his works were purchased by the former Saxon Minister of War, Jacob Heinrich von Flemming.

After Flemming's death in 1728, Thiele returned to Arnstadt. In 1729, he became court painter to Günther XLIII, Prince of Schwarzburg-Sondershausen, but he also worked for the courts in Braunschweig and Kassel. In 1738, he was named court painter for King Augustus III of Poland and, in 1740, acquired the patronage of Heinrich von Brühl. During this period, he received 1000 Thalers and free lodging for creating four landscape views of the Eastern Ore Mountains and Mount Oybin in the Zittau Mountains, as well as some of the first paintings of the Lößnitz region.

Unfortunately, 1740 was also the year when his wife died. After completing his commission, in 1743, he remarried and was awarded the title of "Hofkommissar" (Court Inspector). Six years later, he commissioned to do another series of landscapes; this time of Mecklenburg, under the direction of Duke Christian Ludwig II.

Three years after his death, the art historian and collector Christian Ludwig von Hagedorn wrote his biography (although it appears to be unavailable at present). His son, Johann Friedrich Alexander Thiele, also became a well-known landscape painter.
