= Zvon =

Zvon may refer to:

- Grandhotel Zvon, České Budějovice, Czechia
- Velký Zvon, a hill in Bohemia, formerly called Zvon
- Zweckverband Verkehrsverbund Oberlausitz-Niederschlesien (ZVON), German transport association
