= Jønsberg =

Jønsberg or Jonsberg may refer to:

== People ==
- Barry Jonsberg (born 1951), Australian author and teacher
- Nils Jønsberg (1808-1885), Norwegian priest and politician

== Places ==
- Jønsberg Upper Secondary School, an upper secondary school in Stange Municipality, Norway
- Jonsberg (Zittau Mountains), a mountain of Saxony, in southeastern Germany
