= Buchberg (Zittau Mountains) =

- Location within Saxony

Highest point
- Elevation: 651.6 m (2,138 ft)
- Coordinates: 50°51′18″N 14°40′30″E

Geography
- Location: Saxony, Germany
- Parent range: Zittau Mountains

Geology
- Mountain type: Cone mountain
- Rock type: Sandstone

The Buchberg (German pronunciation: [ˈbuːxˌbɛʁk]) is a wide cone-shaped mountain on the northern edge of the Zittau Mountains which is 651 m above sea level (NN). The Buchberg is entirely wooded. Whilst the mountain drops steeply to the east and north, it slopes away relatively gently to the south and west. South of the mountain is an area of raised bog which forms the source region of the Svitavka.

== Location and area ==
The Buchberg rises west of the village of Jonsdorf and east of Waltersdorf. The road from Jonsdorf to Waltersdorf runs across the northern slopes of the mountain.

== Routes to the top ==
- The peak may be ascended from hiking paths, most of which run from Jonsdorf in the general direction of the summit. No direct paths run over the summit itself.
