= Verkehrsverbund Oberlausitz-Niederschlesien =

Silesian transport association

- Wobchadniski zaměrowy zwězk Górna Łužyca-Dolnošlazyńska
- Abbreviation: ZVON
- Named after: Upper Lusatia and Lower Silesia
- Established: June 28, 1995; 31 years ago
- Founded at: Niesky, Saxony, Germany
- Type: Transport association
- Legal status: GmbH
- Subsidiaries: Verkehrsverbund Oberlausitz-Niederschlesien
- Staff: 22
- Website: zvon.de

The Zweckverband Verkehrsverbund Oberlausitz-Niederschlesien (Upper Lusatia–Lower Silesia Transport Association or ZVON) is a transport association run by public transport providers in the German state of Saxony. The ZVON area comprises the district of Görlitz and the eastern part of the district of Bautzen.

== Members ==
The following companies are members of ZVON:

- Lassak-Reisen Bautzener Busreisen
- Omnibusbetrieb Beck
- Omnibusbetrieb S. Wilhelm
- Ostdeutsche Eisenbahn GmbH (ODEG)
- Regionalbus Oberlausitz GmbH (RBO)
- Sächsisch-Oberlausitzer Eisenbahngesellschaft mbH (SOEG)
- Schmidt-Reisen Busunternehmen
- Verkehrsgesellschaft Görlitz GmbH (VGG)
- Die Länderbahn GmbH DLB – branded as Trilex
- DB Regio Bus Ost GmbH

== Railway service ==
ZVON provides the following regional rail services in its area:

Timetable no.	Route	Route no.	Operator(s)
220	Zittau – Görlitz – Weißwasser – Cottbus	OE65	ODEG
229	Hoyerswerda – Görlitz	OE64	ODEG
230	Dresden – Bischofswerda – Bautzen – Görlitz (Görlitz–Dresden railway)	RE1, RB60, OE60V	Die Länderbahn („Trilex“), ODEG
235	Dresden – Bischofswerda – Ebersbach – Zittau (– Liberec)	RE2, RB61	Die Länderbahn („Trilex“)
236	Rybniště / Seifhennersdorf – Varnsdorf – Großschönau (Sachsen) – Zittau – Hrádek nad Nisou – Liberec	L7	Die Länderbahn („Trilex“)
238	Zittau – Olbersdorf – Bertsdorf – Kurort Jonsdorf / Kurort Oybin (Zittau–Oybin/Jonsdorf railway)	SOEG	SOEG
