= Mühlsteinbrüche =

Old smithy in Jonsdorf

Coordinates: 50°50′44.946406″N 14°41′41.603222″E

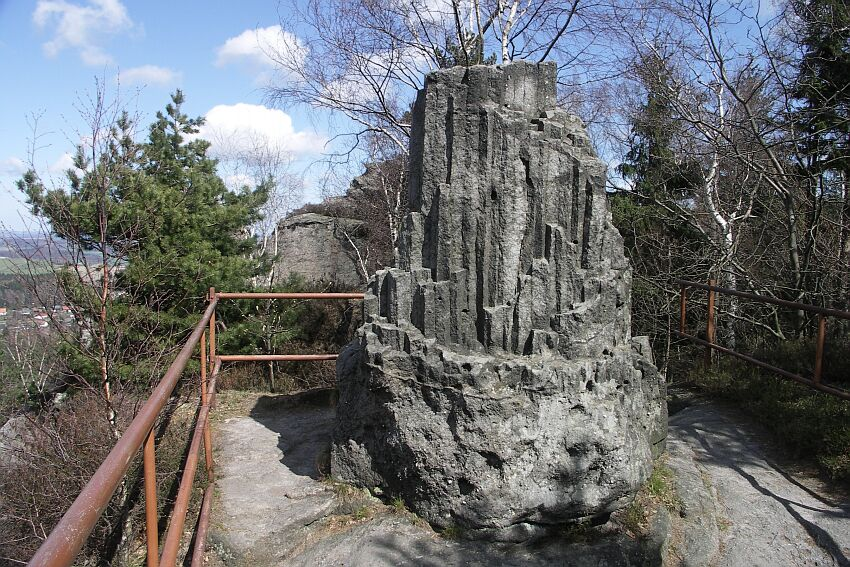
Kleine Orgel ("Little Organ")

The Mühlsteinbrüche ("Millstone Quarries", Upper Sorbian: Skały młyna) south of Jonsdorf in the Zittau Mountains in Saxony are a region of bizarre rock formations, which have been formed by the quarrying of sandstone for millstones and also by weathering processes. They are a popular hiking and climbing area. An educational trail runs through the region which has an area of about 35 hectares.

== Location and surrounding area ==
The Mühlsteinbrüche are located south of Jonsdorf at a height of 480 to 560 metres. To the southwest they are adjoined by the Jonsdorfer Felsenstadt. About 600 metres to the south is the border with the Czech Republic.

== Geology ==
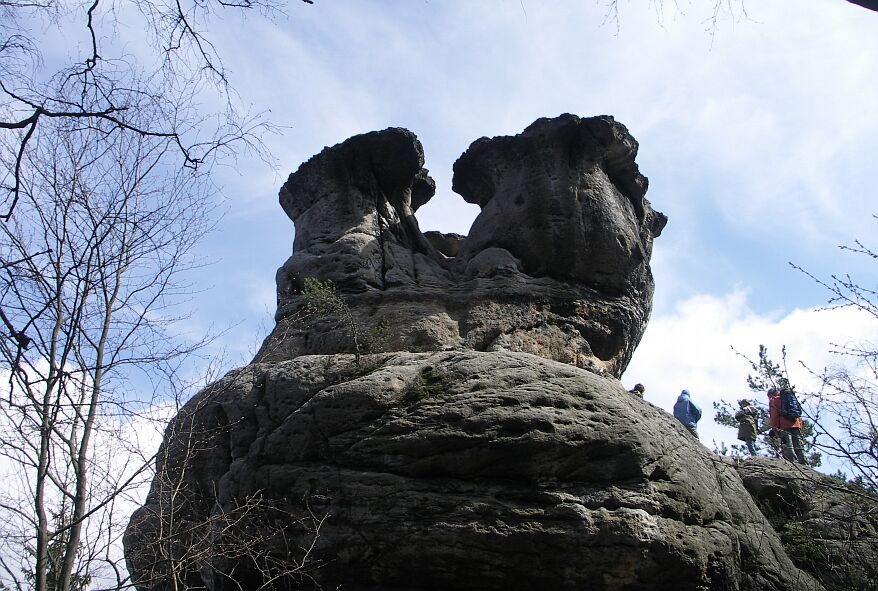
Drei Tische ("Three Tables")

The sandstone in the Mühlsteinbrüche region was formed in the geological age of the Middle Turonian and, based on its formation, belongs to the Bohemian Cretaceous Basin. It is characterised by several special features. For example, the sandstone, which was formed by sedimentation, has been breached multiple times by basaltic and phonolitic intrusions as a result of contact with occurrences of Tertiary volcanism in North Bohemia. Often, in these cases, the rock has been exposed to thermal changes (contact with magma and hydrothermal fluids), which has led to vitrification of the rock (a melting of mineral grains at their grain boundaries). The sandstone retains its porosity, is hardened by the strength of its grain structure and thus its abrasion resistance is increased.

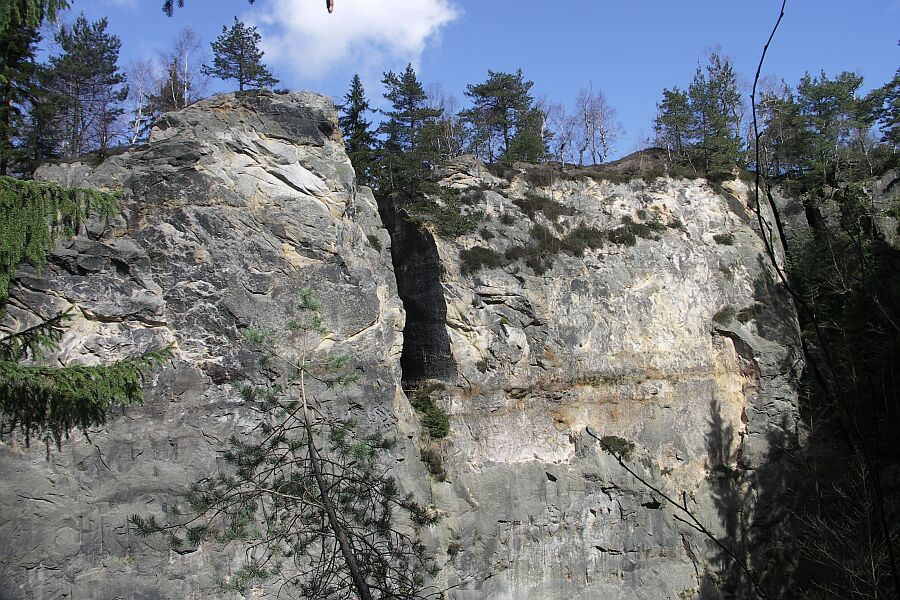
Schwarzes Loch ("Black Hole")

The area of Mühlsteinbrüche has as additional geological feature: its pronounced columnar sandstone. Its best known rock formation is the Große und Kleine Orgel ("Great and Little Organ"), whose appearance is easily confused with that of columnar basalt. The columns, which are completely atypical for sandstone, have a diameter of up to 15 centimetres and are bundled vertically on a solid, non-columnar sandstone block. They have been formed by thermal processes as a result of contact with magma. In 1852 Alexander von Humboldt sent an artist and two geologists here to study this phenomenon.

== History ==
The use of sandstone in the Zittau Mountains for the production of millstones was already under way from the 16th century. The Jonsdorf Mühlsteinbrüche were one of more than 40 quarrying sites in the surrounding region. In 1560, quarrying began in Jonsdorf itself. Over 350 years, sandstone was quarried here and made into millstones with a diameter of up to 2.70 metres. To do this, the millstones were initially hewn out of one piece of rock. From about 1850, millstones were assembled from several pieces as there were no longer any sufficiently large and homogeneous sandstone blocks being quarried. Production was maintained until 1918. The main markets were in Russia and England. Moscow and Saint Petersburg had their own offices for the millstone trade.

In the 1950s, a nature trail was laid out by friends of nature and local history. From 1990, a restoration of the quarries was begun in order to make them accessible. In 2002, a demonstration workshop was built in the Schwarzer Loch ("Black Hole"). Today the Mühlsteinbrüche are a major attraction in the Zittau Mountains.

== Sights ==
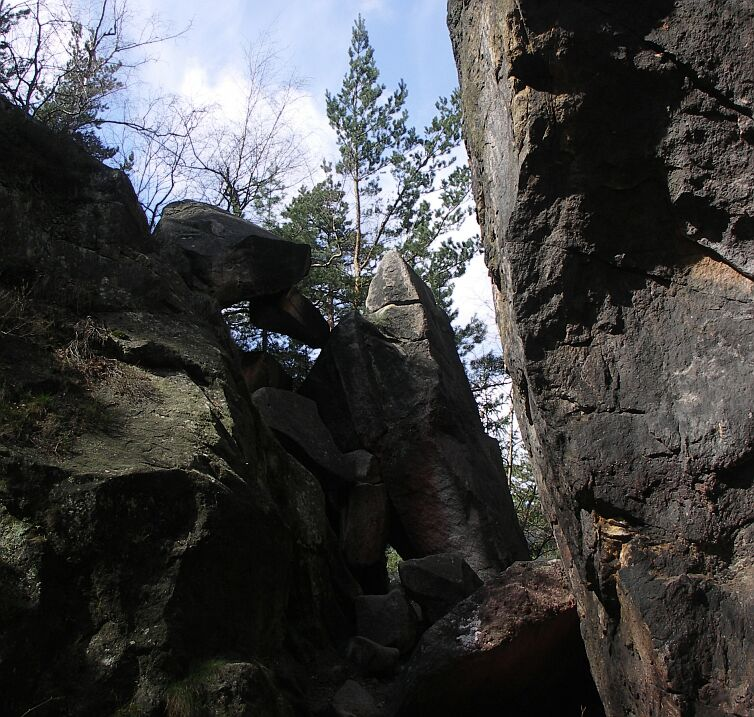
The Mausefalle ("Mousetrap")

- Rock formations:
  - Drei Tische, kidney-shaped sandstone rock formation, formed from iron oxide precipitation
  - Mausefalle ("Mousetrap"), a rock formation created by a rock collapse in 1908
  - Nashorn ("Rhino") and Bernhardiner
  - Große und Kleine Orgel ("Great and Little Organs")
  - Löwe ("Lion")
  - Humboldtfelsen ("Humboldt Rock"), a 7-metre-high basalt shaft in the Schwarzer Bruch ("Black Quarry")
  - Schnapslager
  - Rutsche ("Slide")
- Old quarries
  - Bärloch ("Bear Cave")
  - Weißer Felsen ("White Rock")
  - Schwarzes Loch ("Black Hole") with its demonstration workshop and tunnel
  - Kellerbergbruch
- Old Smithy:
  - Steinbruchschmiede

== Literature ==
- Andreas Gerth: Geologische Exkursionen in der Oberlausitz und im Elbsandsteingebirge. Oberlausitzer Verlag Spitzkunnersdorf, 2006; ISBN 3-933827-59-0
- Meyers Naturführer Oberlausitz. Meyers Lexikonverlag Mannheim/Leipzig/Vienna/Zurich; ISBN 3-411-07161-3
- Die südöstliche Oberlausitz mit Zittau und dem Zittauer Gebirge. Edition no. 2 Akademie-Verlag Berlin, Berlin 1971 (Werte der deutschen Heimat. Vol. 16). p. 207–208.
