= Breiteberg =

Mountain in Saxony, Germany

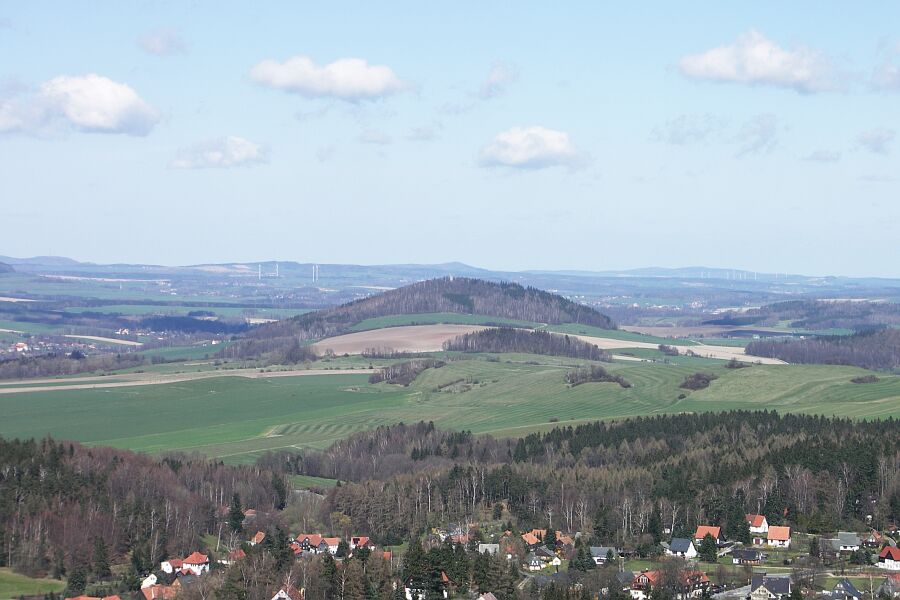
- The Breiteberg seen from the "Jonsdorfer Felsenstadt"

Highest point
- Elevation: 510 m (1,670 ft)
- Coordinates: 50°53′31″N 14°42′16″E

Naming
- Pronunciation: German: [ˈbʁaɪtəbɛɐ̯k]

Geography
- Location within Saxony
- Location: Saxony, Germany
- Parent range: Lusatian Highlands

Geology
- Mountain type: Phonolite

The Breiteberg is a hill in the Lusatian Highlands in Free State of Saxony, Federal Republic of Germany, with an altitude of 510 metres (1,670 ft) above mean sea level. It is the local mountain of Hainewalde, and about half-an-hour's drive from the village. Phonolite covers most of its surface.

== Location and surroundings ==
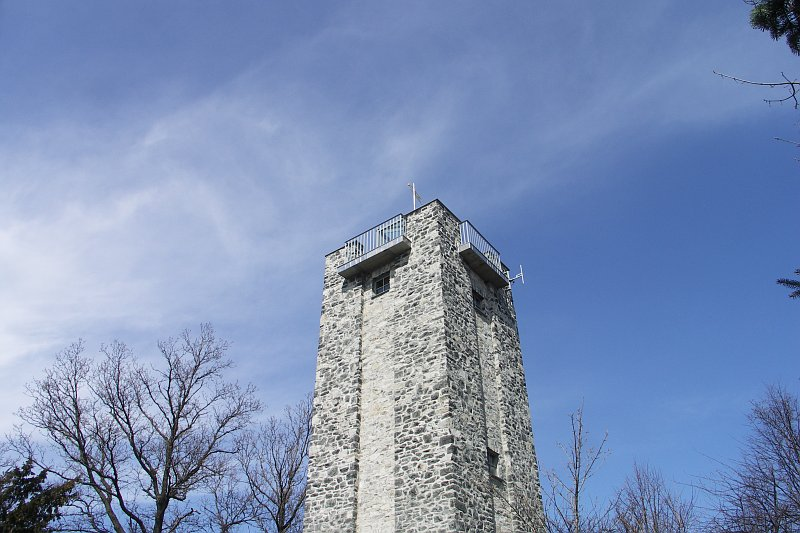
Dr.-Curt-Heinke-Tower

The Breiteberg is located in the transition area between the Zittau Mountains and the Lusatian Highlands between the villages Hainewalde, Großschönau and Bertsdorf.

== History ==
The mountain has been the site of many legends in the past few centuries. These include the Querxe, a kind of dwarf said to have been living in the hill, "The Wild Hunter on the Breitenberge" (Der Wilde Jäger auf dem Breitenberge) as well as "The Dragon on the Breitenberge" (Der Drache auf dem Breitenberge).

In 1467, Zittau folk ambushed the Hussites on the hill, killing 150 as they tried to escape to Bohemia after a successful raid.

In 1880, Johann Franz Vorknecht opened a summer restaurant on top of the Breiteberg. It is one of the area's oldest mountain restaurants (German: Bergbaude). In 1936, the Dr. Kurt Heinke Tower was constructed. It is named in honour of a "meritorious connoisseur of southern Upper Lusatia".

In 1881, a monument to Frederick III, a German Emperor was built on the north side with the inscription "Learn to suffer without complaining" (German: Lerne leiden ohne zu klagen). The monument, made of bronze on a stone plinth was 5 metres high and built by the reputable company of "Gladebeck und Sohn" from Berlin. The monument was removed in 1949, nowadays just the stone plinth is left.

== Observation tower ==
The summit is wooded but the tower provides a superb panoramic view in all directions towards the Lusatian and Zittau Mountains, the Lusatian Highlands, the Landeskrone nearby Görlitz, the Jizera Mountains, the Giant Mountains and the Ještěd. A key for the tower can be borrowed from the restaurant.

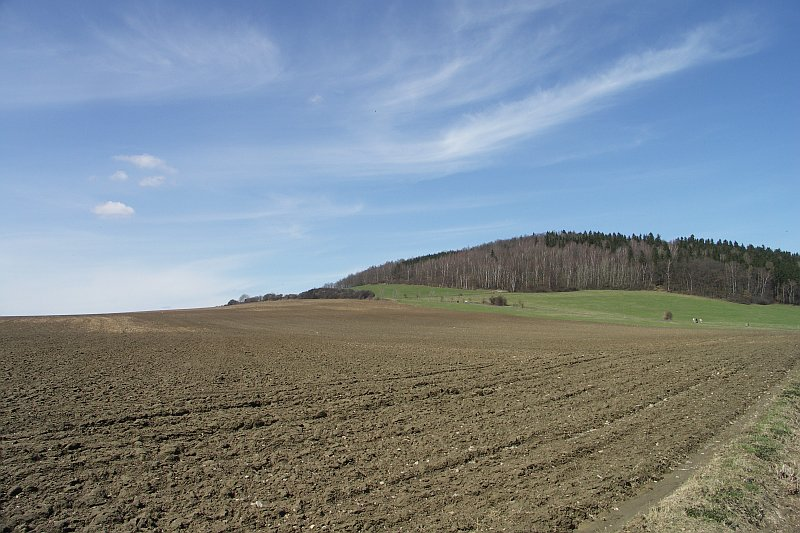
View from Bertsdorf

== Routes to the summit ==
Three ways lead to the summit, two of which are illuminated. A cycle path leads uphill from Bertsdorf which is also used for resupplying the restaurant. The Martin Köhler Way from Hainewalde is for hikers.

== Sights ==
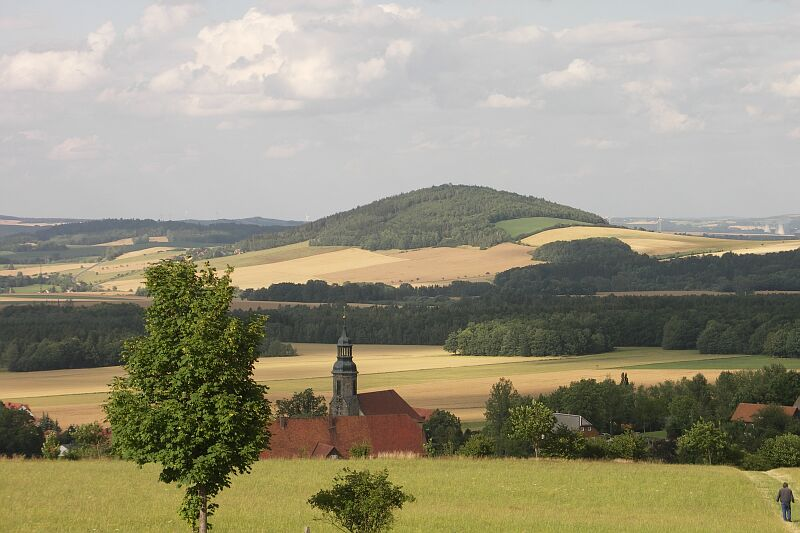
Breiteberg seen from Waltersdorf village

- Querxloch (cave-like crevice)
- Querxenbrunnen (enclosed spring)
- Dr. Kurt Heinke Tower (13m observation tower on the hilltop)

== Literature ==
- Meyers Naturführer Oberlausitz; Meyers Lexikonverlag Mannheim/Leipzig/Wien/Zürich; ISBN 3-411-07161-3
- Werte unserer Heimat – Die südöstliche Oberlausitz mit Zittau und dem Zittauer Gebirge. Akademieverlag Berlin 1975
