= VGG =

VGG may refer to:

- Volgograd Oblast
- Van de Graaff generator
- Verkehrsgesellschaft Görlitz
- Visual Geometry Group, an academic group focused on computer vision at Oxford University
  - VGGNet, a deep convolutional network for object recognition developed and trained by this group
- Vaush.gg, website of American streamer Vaush, also used as a metonym for his fanbase
