= Trams in Görlitz =

Tram system in Görlitz, Saxony, Germany

Coordinates: 51°09′11″N 14°59′12″E

Görlitz tramway network
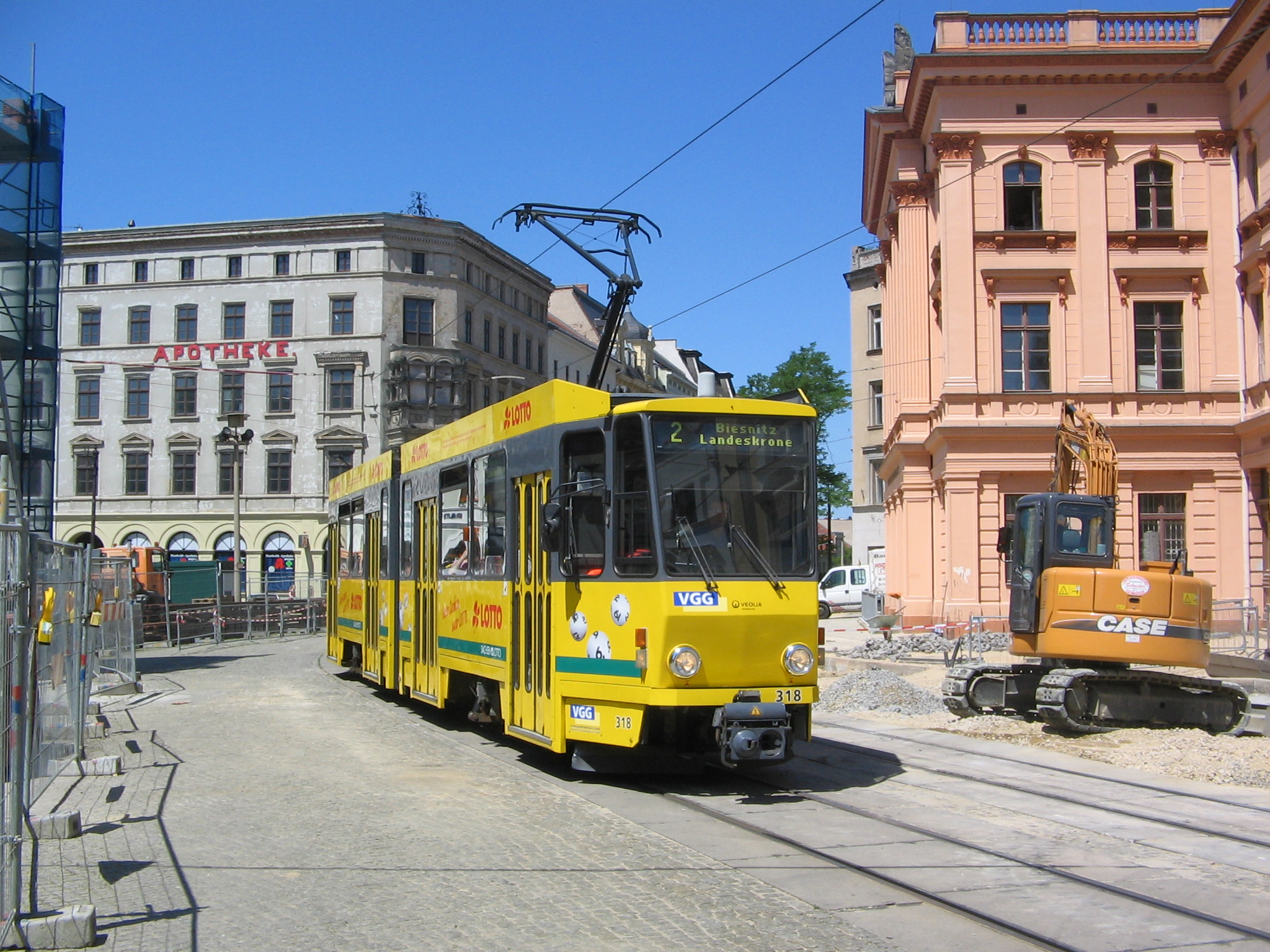
- Tatra KT4D no. 318 in June 2010

Operation
- Locale: Görlitz, Saxony, Germany

Statistics
Horsecar era: 1882–1897
- Status: Converted to electricity
- Track gauge: 1,435 mm (4 ft 8 1/2 in)
- Propulsion system: Horses
Electric tram era: since 1897
- Status: Operational
- Operators: Görlitzer Verkehrsbetriebe (GVB); (since 2019)
- Track gauge: 1,000 mm (3 ft 3 3/8 in)
- Propulsion system: Electricity
- Electrification: 600 V DC
- Stock: 14 KT4D-C
- Route length: 11.8 km (7.3 mi)
Görlitz tramway network, 2019.
- Website: https://www.goerlitztakt.de/ Görlitzer Verkehrsbetriebe (in German)

The Görlitz tramway network (German: Straßenbahnnetz Görlitz) is a network of tramways forming part of the public transport system in Görlitz, a city in the federal state of Saxony, Germany.

Opened in 1882, the network has been operated since 1996 by the Verkehrsgesellschaft Görlitz (VGG), since 2019 by the Görlitzer Verkehrsbetriebe, and is integrated in the Verkehrsverbund Oberlausitz-Niederschlesien (ZVON).

== Lines ==
As of 2019, the network had the following lines:

Line	Route	Stops	Journey time	Headway (rush hour)	Headway (evenings)
1	Weinhübel – Bahnhof – Demianiplatz – Alexander-Bolze-Hof – Königshufen Am Marktkauf / (– Königshufen Am Wiesengrund) (the Königshufen termini alternate in the evenings)	17	24/25 min	20 min	30 min
2	Biesnitz/Landeskrone – Bahnhof – Demianiplatz – Alexander-Bolze-Hof – Königshufen Am Wiesengrund	17	24/25 min	20 min	-

On weekdays line 1 is served by coupled pairs of trams.

== Rolling stock ==
The current fleet consists of 14 KT4D trams built between 1979 and 1990. The trams were modernised during the 1990s with a chopper control system and received the designation KT4D-C.

In 2019 a procurement project for new trams was launched jointly with tram operators in Leipzig and Zwickau. A contract was signed in December 2021 with LEIWAG (a consortium of HeiterBlick and Kiepe Electric) and Görlitz will receive eight new 30 m long trams. However, the operators in Görlitz and Zwickau cancelled this order because of supplier delays, cost escalations and uncertain delivery dates. In 2026, Stadler was awarded the contract for new trams.

In 2026, the operators in Görlitz and Zwickau jointly ordered 14 Stadler TINA trams with eight to operate in Gorlitz and six in Zwickau. The low-floor, single-ended trams will each be 50 metres (160 ft) long, and will be built at Stadler's plant in Poland. The trams for both cities will be identical in design. The TINA trams will be the first low-floor trams in Görlitz.

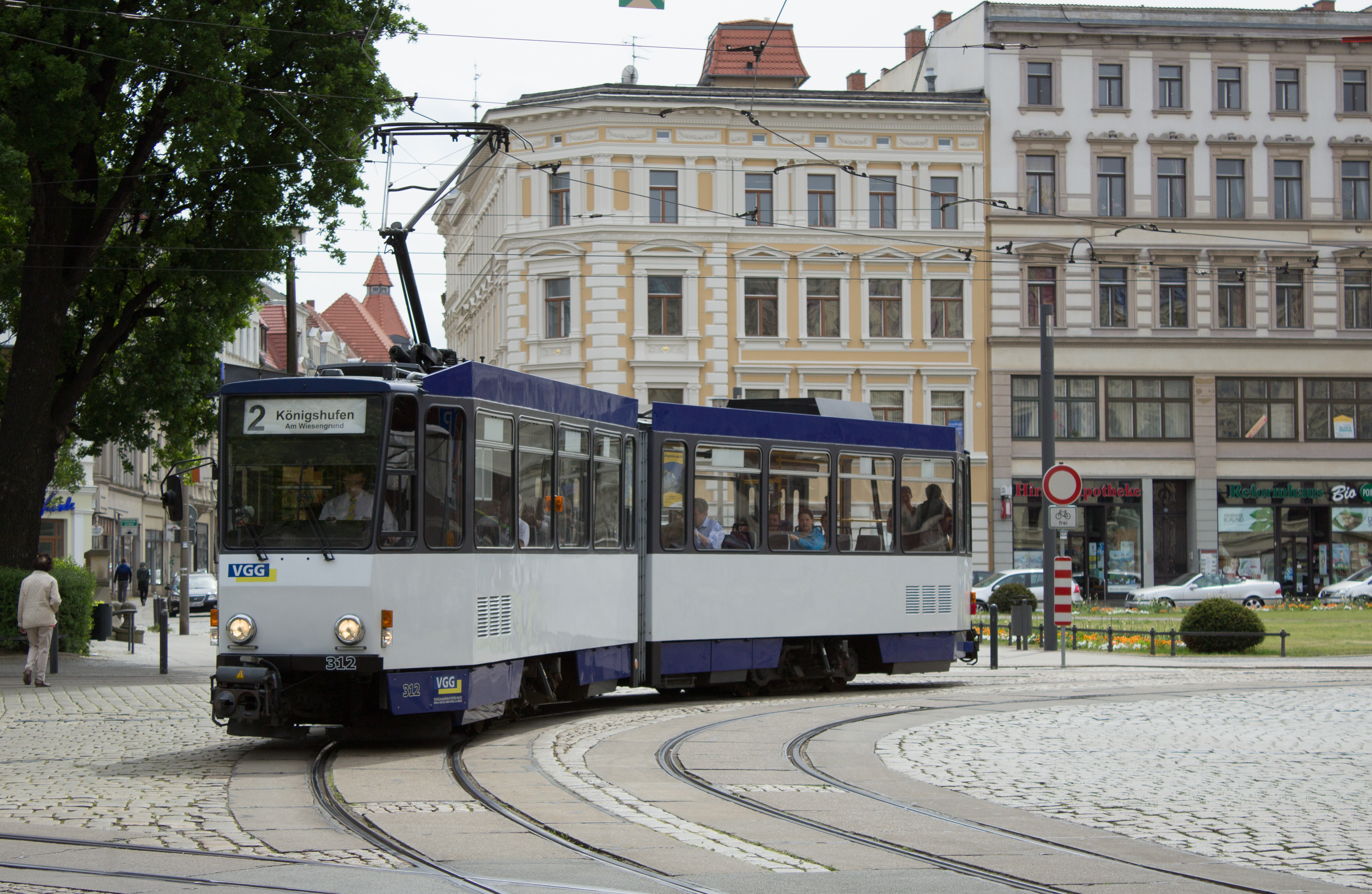
Set 312 in May 2015

== See also ==
- List of town tramway systems in Germany
- Trams in Germany
