= Töpfer (hill) =

Mountain in Germany

Mount Töpfer
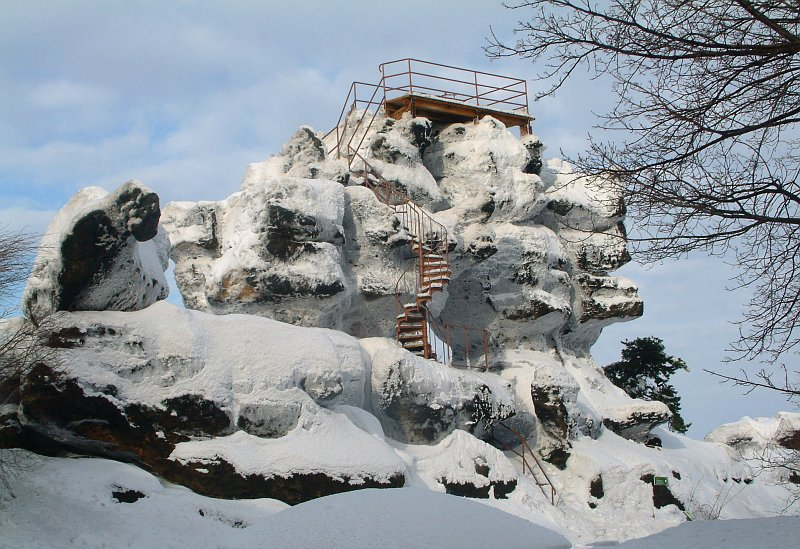
- Rock formation with look-out on Mount Töpfer

Highest point
- Elevation: 582 m (1,909 ft)DE-HN
- Coordinates: 50°50′54″N 14°45′44″E

Geography
- Location: Saxony, Germany

Geology
- Mountain type: sandstone

Mount Töpfer (Upper Sorbian: Hóra Töpfer) is a mountain with an elevation of 582 metres near the municipality of Oybin in the German state of Saxony. It is situated in the Zittau Mountains which are part of the Lusatian Mountains. It is known for it interesting rock formations near the top. Its name Töpfer (English: Potter) was probably derived from the peak that resembles two chalices.

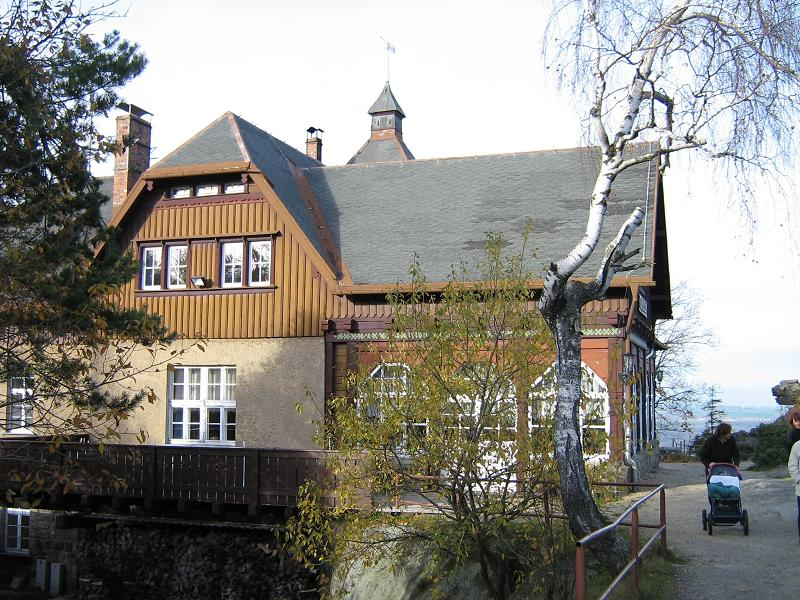
The mountain hut Töpferbaude

== Rock formations and sights ==
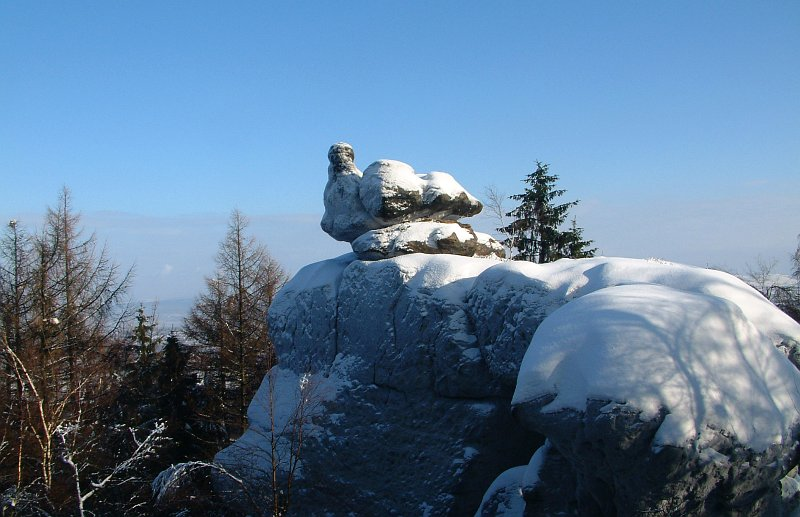
The Broody Hen (Brütende Henne) is one of many bizarre rock formations around the summit

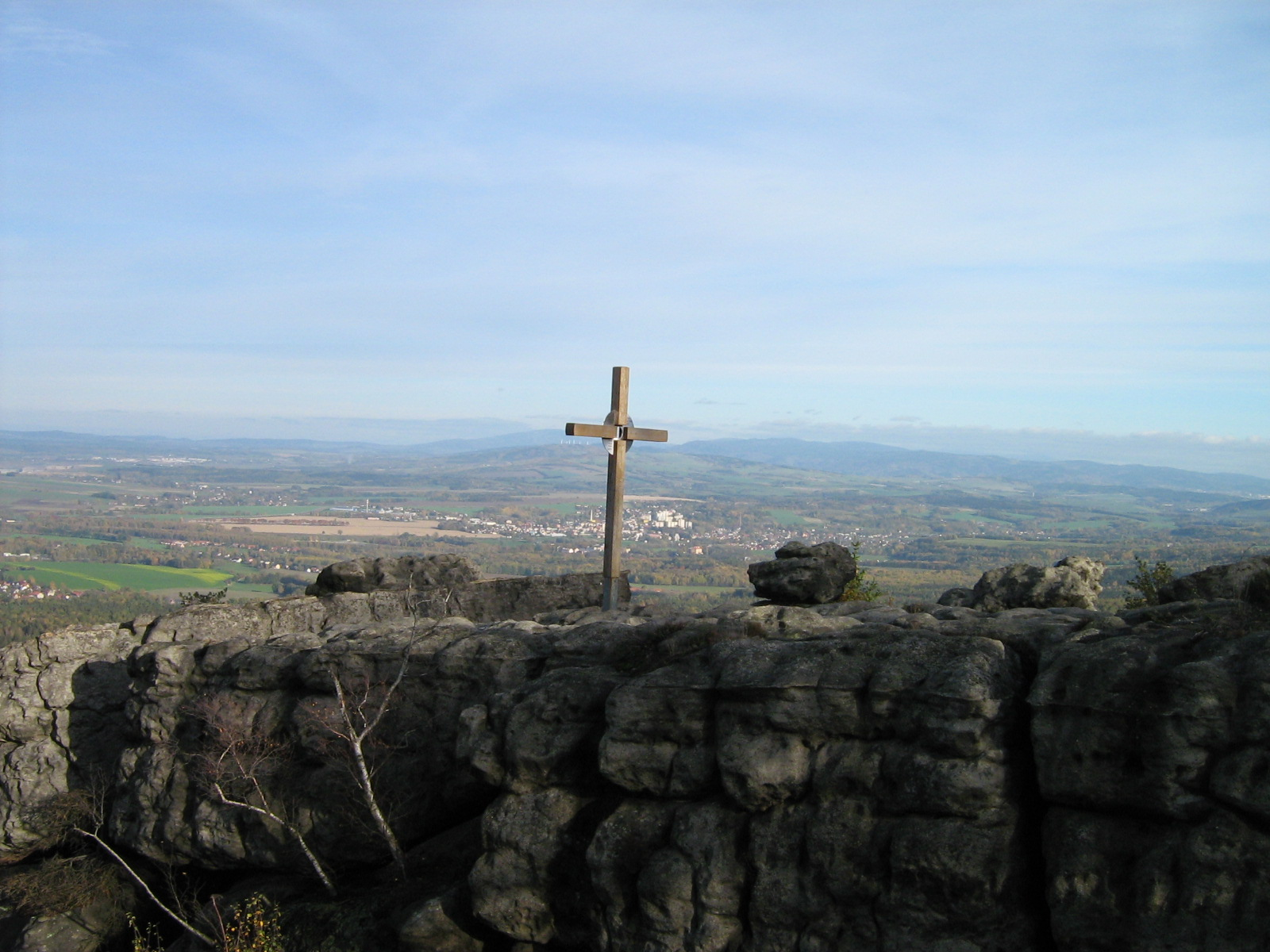
Summit cross with view towards the Izera Mountains

- Parrot (Papagei)
- Turtle (Schildkröte)
- Chick (Küken)
- Wobble Stone (Wackelstein)
- Broody Hen (Brütende Henne)
- European Summit Cross (Europakreuz)
- The Cave of Gratz (Gratzer Höhle)
