= Zittau–Oybin/Jonsdorf railway =

Narrow gauge railway line in Saxony, Germany

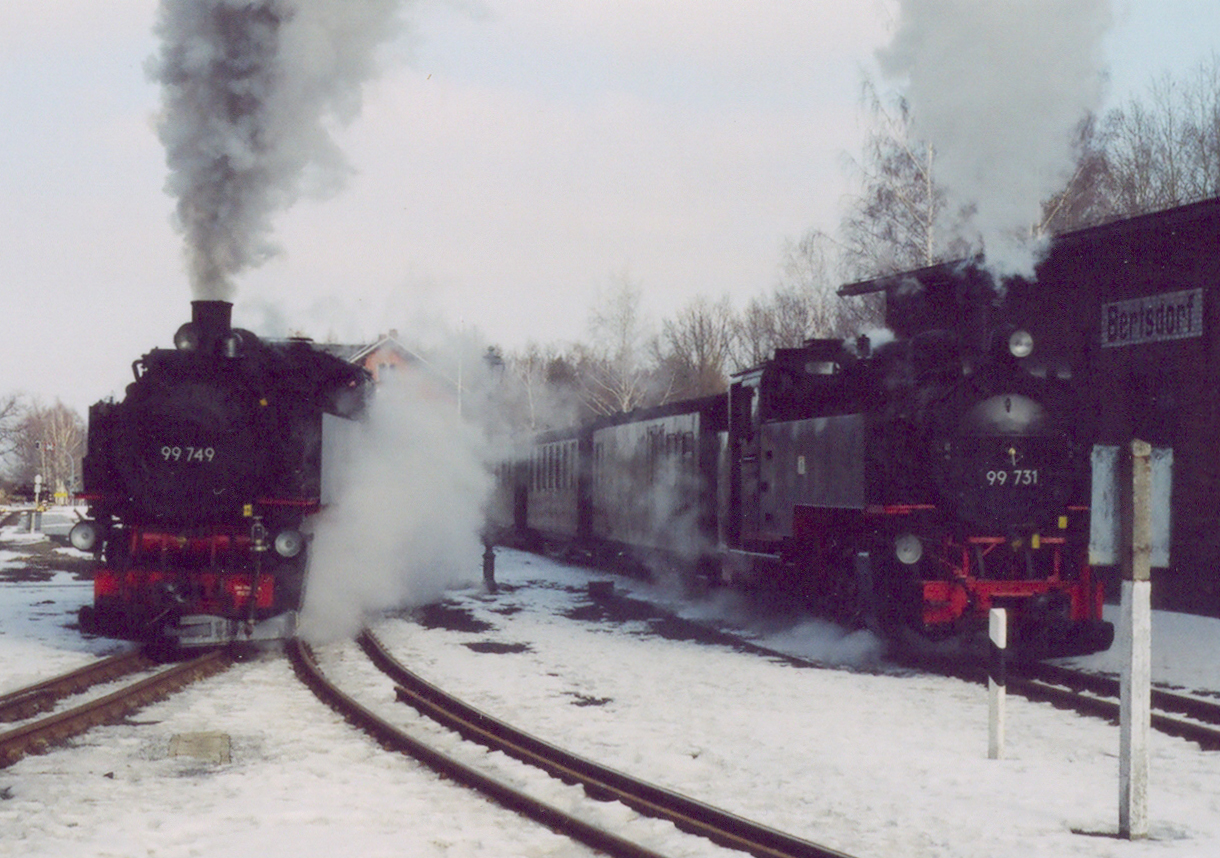
- Two trains depart Bertsdorf

Overview
- Line number: 6960/6961
- Coordinates: 50.890551°N 14.791767°E
- Termini: Zittau; Oybin, Jonsdorf

Service
- Type: narrow-gauge railway
- Route number: 238
- Operator(s): Zittau-Oybin-Jonsdorf Railway Company, Royal Saxon State Railways, Deutsche Reichsbahn, DR, DB, Saxon-Upper Lusatian Railway Company
- Depot(s): Bertsdorf

History
- Opened: November 25, 1889

Technical
- Line length: 16.1 km (10.00 mi)
- Track gauge: 750 mm (2 ft 5 1/2 in)
- Minimum radius: 75 m (246.1 ft)
- Operating speed: 25 km/h (16 mph)
- Maximum incline: 34‰ or 3.4% or 1:29
Route map
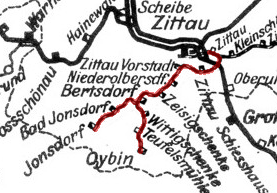

The Zittau–Oybin/Jonsdorf railway, or Zittau–Kurort Oybin/Kurort Jonsdorf narrow-gauge railway (German: Schmalspurbahn Zittau–Kurort Oybin/Kurort Jonsdorf; Upper Sorbian: Žitawa-Kurort Ojbin/Kurort Jonsdorf Wuskokolspurbahn), is a narrow-gauge railway system employing steam locomotives and serving the mountain health-spa resorts (German: Kurorte) of Oybin and Jonsdorf in the Zittau Mountains in southeast Saxony (Germany). The track gauge is 750 mm (2 ft 5 1/2 in).

Steam locomotive in Zittau video

== See also ==
- Narrow-gauge railways in Saxony

== Literature ==
- Gustav W. Ledig: Linie Zittau–Reichenau–Markersdorf in Die schmalspurigen Staatseisenbahnen im Königreiche Sachsen, S. 88 ff., Leipzig 1895. Reprint: Zentralantiquariat der DDR, Leipzig 1987, ISBN 3-7463-0070-3
- Erich Preuß: Die Zittau–Oybin–Jonsdorfer Eisenbahn. transpress Verlag, Stuttgart 1999, ISBN 3-613-71107-9
