= Zittau Mountains =

Mountain range in Germany

Zittau Mountains (Zittauer Gebirge)
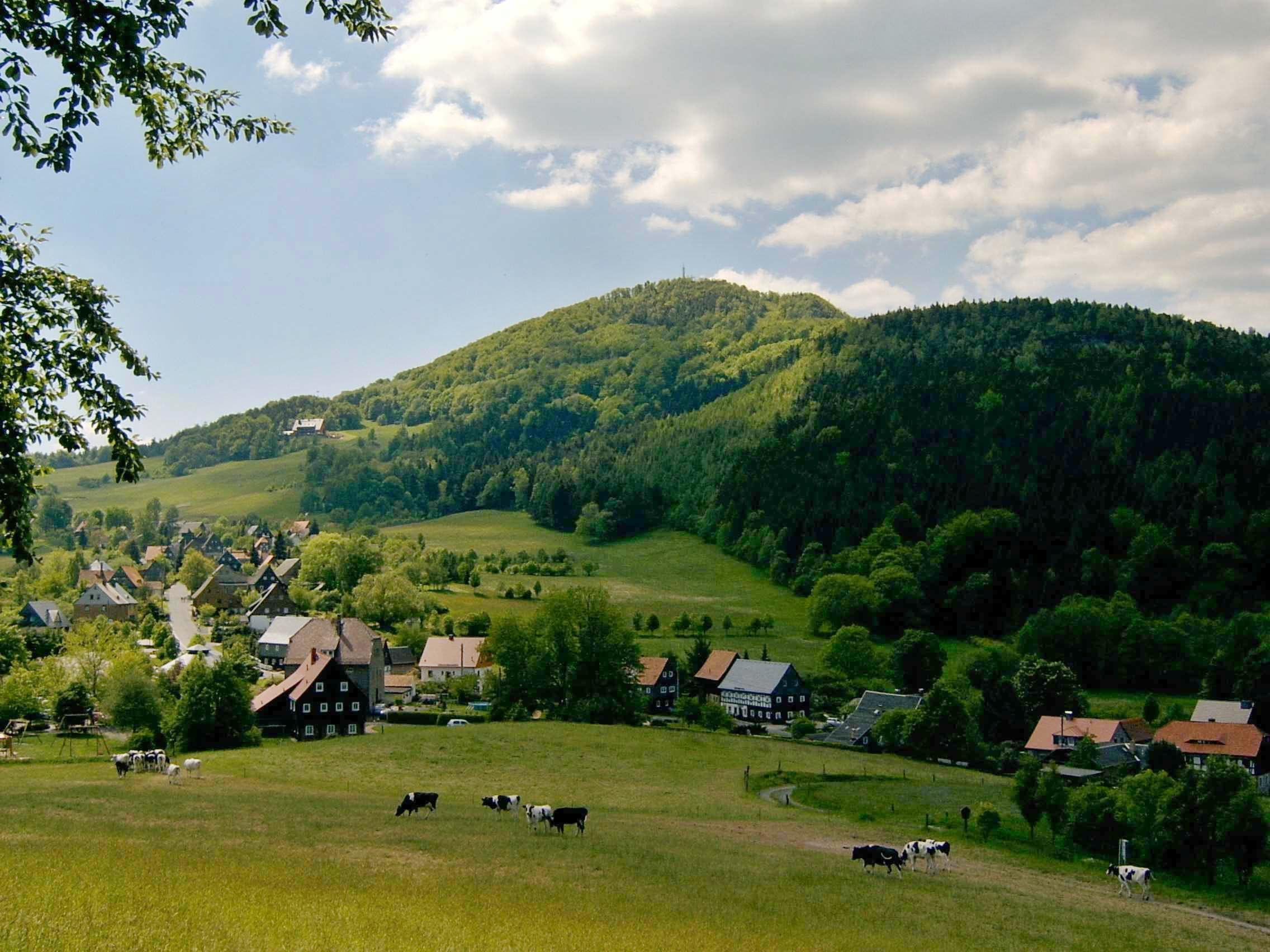
- View over Waltersdorf to the Lausche

Highest point
- Peak: Lausche
- Elevation: 792.6 m above NN

Geography
- Location within Saxony
- State(s): Görlitz, Saxony, Germany
- Range coordinates: 50°50′56″N 14°38′49″E
- Parent range: Lusatian Mountains (cross-border range) and the overarching Saxon Highlands and Uplands (GE)

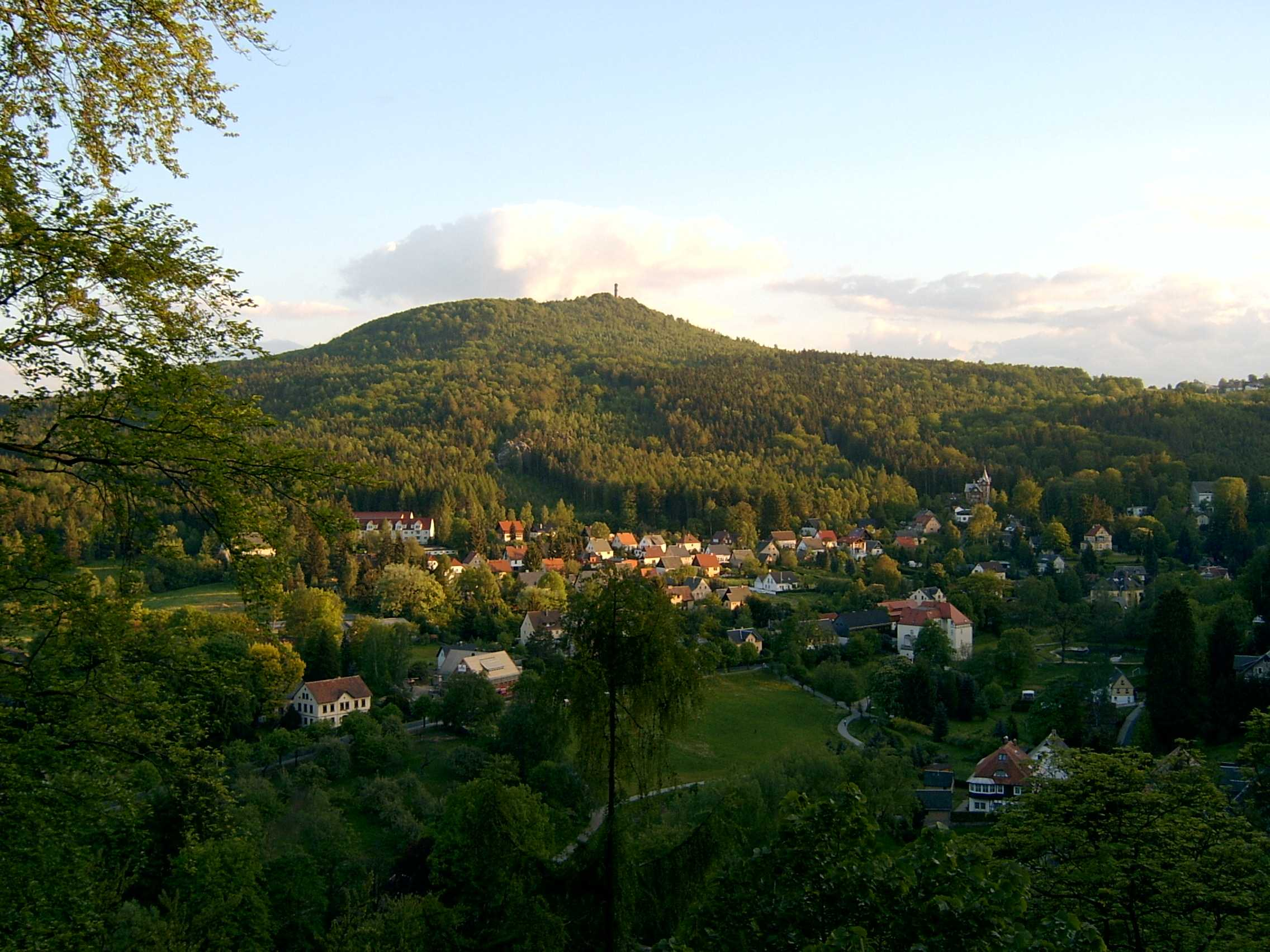
Oybin surrounded by upland forest

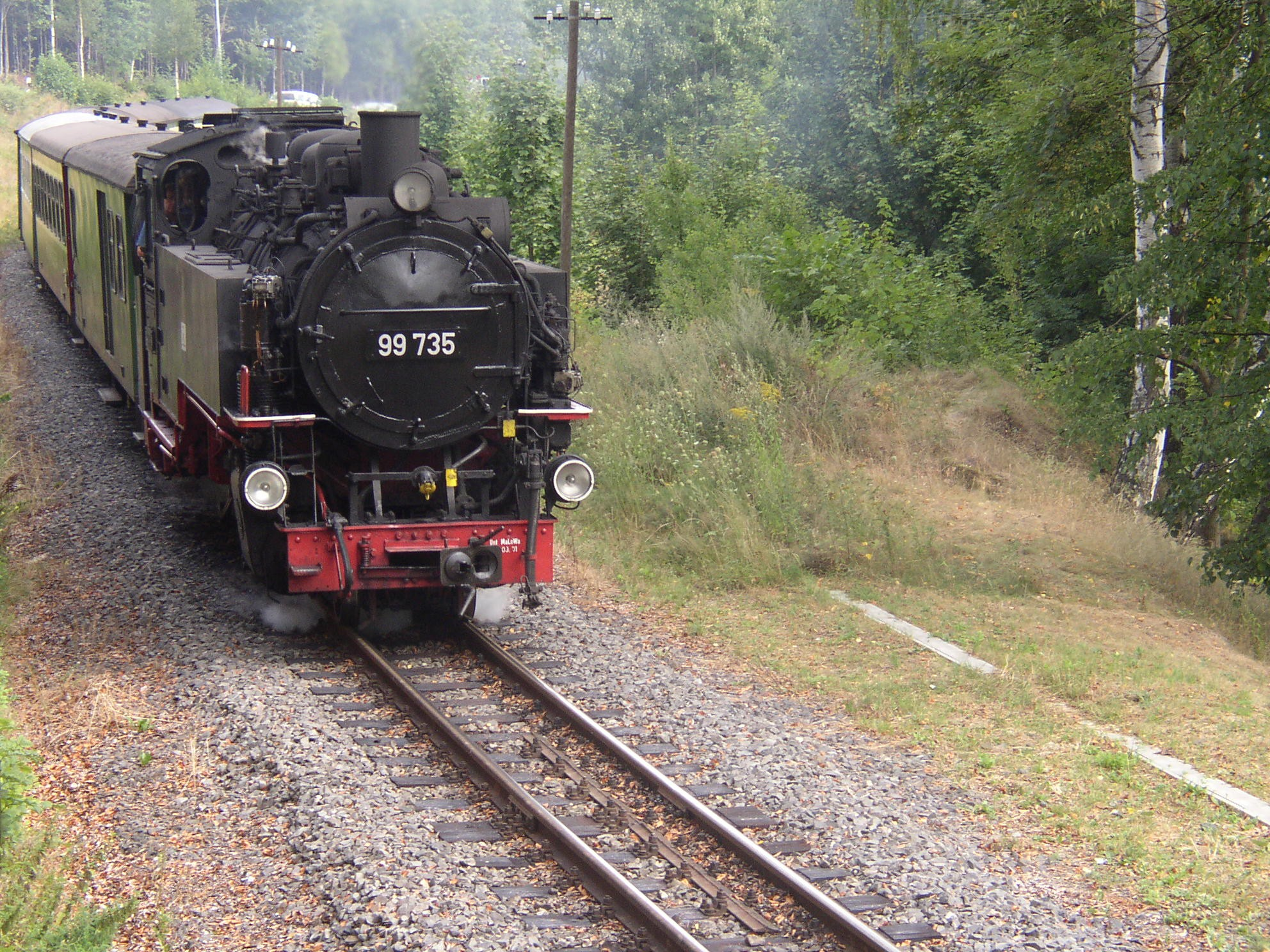
Narrow gauge railway near Oybin Niederdorf

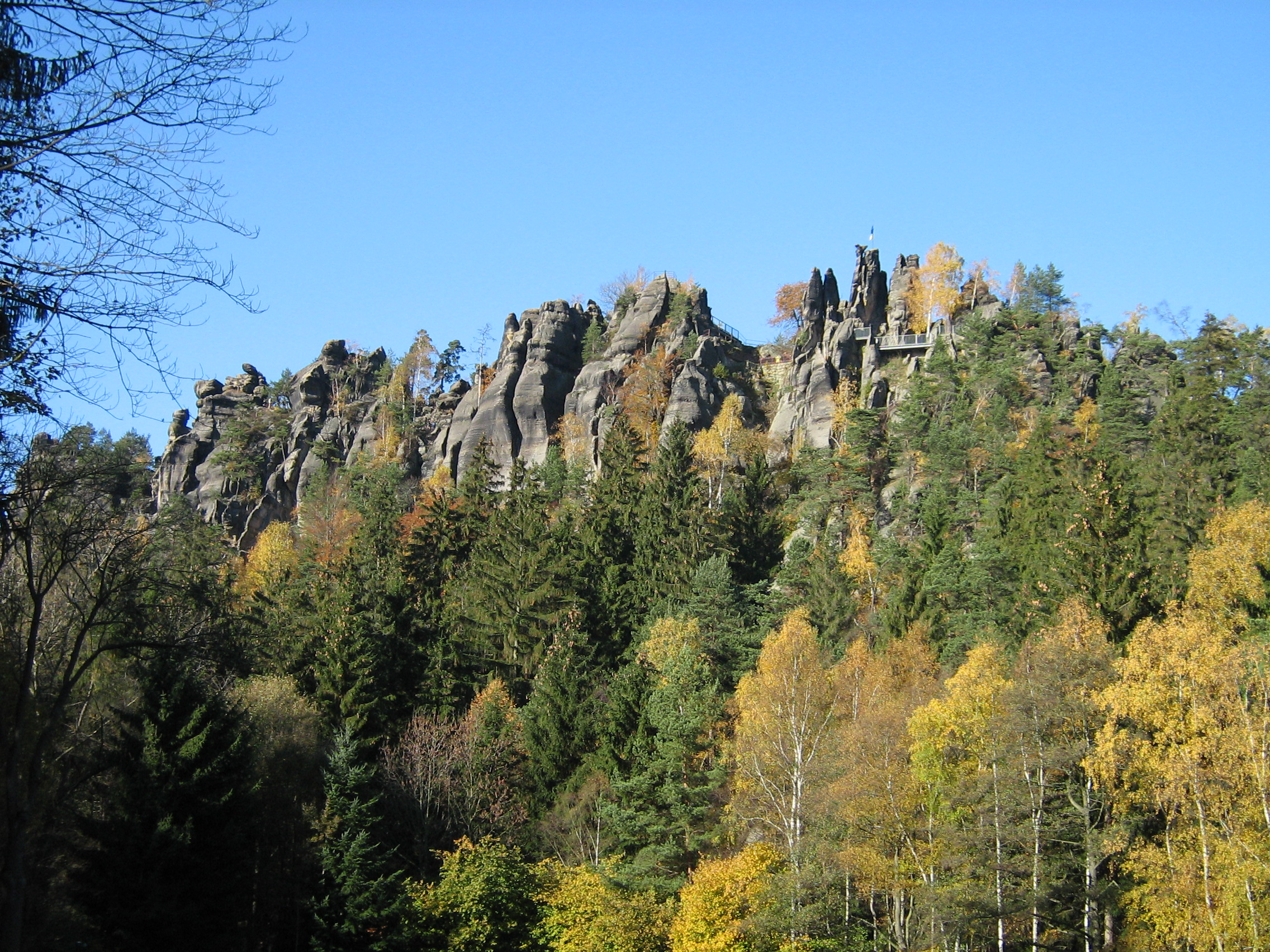
The Nonnenfelsen (Nun's Rock) near Jonsdorf

The Zittau Mountains (German: Zittauer Gebirge, Czech: Žitavské hory; Upper Sorbian: Žitawske horiny), formerly also called the Lusatian Ridge (Lausitzer Kamm; Łužiski česak), refer to the German part of the Lusatian Mountains that straddle the Saxon-Bohemian border in the extreme southeast of the German state of Saxony.

== Geography ==
=== Location ===
The Zittau Mountains lie in the extreme south of the district of Görlitz in Saxony. A few kilometres north of the range lie a number of settlements; from west to east they are Großschönau, Hainewalde, Olbersdorf, Bertsdorf-Hörnitz and Zittau. In the mountains themselves are, again from west to east, the settlements of Waltersdorf, Oybin, Jonsdorf and Lückendorf . The highlands are drained by streams that flow roughly north into the Mandau, a western tributary of the Lusatian Neisse.

=== Mountains ===
Among the highest mountains in the range are the following (in order of height in m above NN:

- Lausche (Luž; 792.6 m), German-Czech border mountain, south of Waltersdorf
- Hochwald (Hvozd; 749.5 m), German-Czech border mountain, south-southwest of Oybin
- Jonsberg (652.9 m), east-southeast of Jonsdorf
- Buchberg (651.6 m), west of Jonsdorf
- Scharfenstein (569.4 m), east of Oybin, north-northwest of Lückendorf
- Breiteberg (510.1 m), east of Großschönau, south of Hainewalde
- Oybin (514.5 m), north of Oybin
- Töpfer (582.0 m), northeast of Oybin, south of Olbersdorf

== Places of interest ==
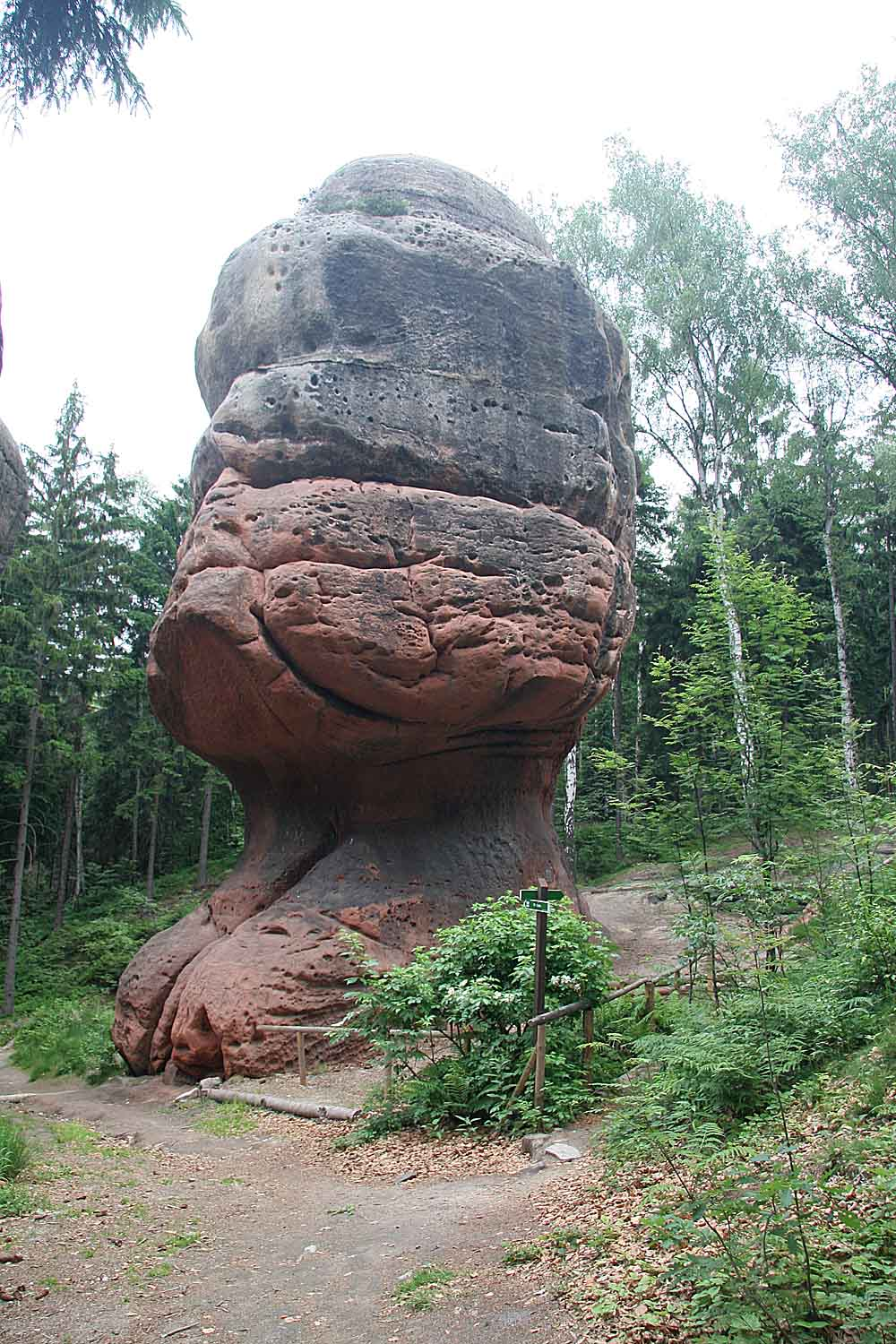
The Kelchstein

- Oybin mountain with castle and monastery ruins
- Mühlsteinbrüche, rock formations in Jonsdorf
- Große Felsengasse ("Great Rock Alley")
- Töpfer mountain
- Lausche (792.6m), the highest summit in the Zittau Mountains
- Breiteberg
- Scharfenstein
- Orgel (organ) - a rock formation in the Jonsdorfer Felsenstadt
- Kelchstein ("Chalice Rock", Upper Sorbian: Kelch-skalizna; 50°49′59.2″N 14°44′29.8″E): a mushroom rock in the mountains near Oybin. The Kelchstein consists of a Cretaceous sandstone with very little cementing material. Its unusual mushroom shape has been caused by wind and other erosive processes on sandstone strata of different hardness. The Kelchstein is one of the best known climbing rocks in the Zittau Mountains. It was first climbed before 1785, when woodcutters fixed a plaque to the summit; the plaque is no longer there. Its development for sports climbing started on 3 September 1911. Dresden climbers ascended the rocks with the aid of a tree at its northwestern corner. The first sports climb without any aids was up the present-day "Old Way" (Alter Weg) by Siegfried Schreiber on 26 June 1946. The Kelch is one of the most difficult summits to climb in the Zittau Mountains. Today there are only five routes, all at climbing grades of VIIc and VIIIc.
- Nonnenfelsen ("Nun's Rock") near Jonsdorf
- Zittau Narrow Gauge Railway
- Lusatian timber-frame farmhouses (Umgebindehäuser), especially in Waltersdorf, Jonsdorf and Bertsdorf

== See also ==
- Zittau Mountains Nature Park
- List of regions of Saxony

== General sources ==
- BfN
  - Map services
  - Landscape fact file Zittau Mountains

== Literature ==
- Peter Rölke (ed.): Wander- & Naturführer Zittauer Gebirge, Berg- & Naturverlag Rölke, Dresden 2006, ISBN 3-934514-17-0
