= Scharfenstein (Lusatian Mountains) =

Mountain in Germany

Scharfenstein (Sharp Stone)
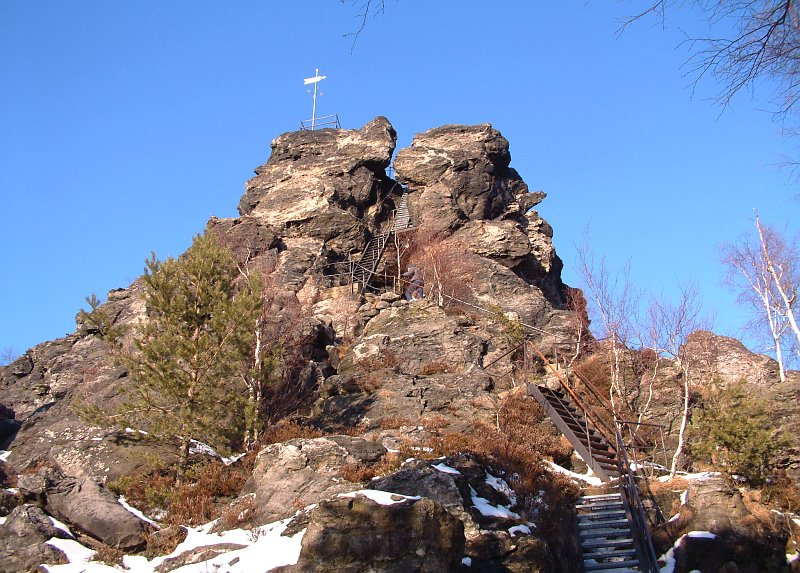
- The Scharfenstein (Sharp Stone) with staircase to the lookout

Highest point
- Elevation: 569.4 m (1,868 ft)
- Coordinates: 50°50′27″N 14°45′29.5″E

Geography
- Location: Saxony, Germany

Geology
- Mountain type: Sandstone

The Scharfenstein (English: Sharp Stone; Upper Sorbian: Wótry kamjeń) is a rock formation approximately 25 metres high situated in the Lusatian Mountains. The mountain has an elevation of 569 metres and is located in the southeastern German state of Saxony. Due to its distinctive shape, it is also known locally as the "Upper-Lusatian Matterhorn." The rock can be accessed via ladders and a staircase from the south and is considered one of the most famous lookouts in the Zittau Mountains.

== View ==
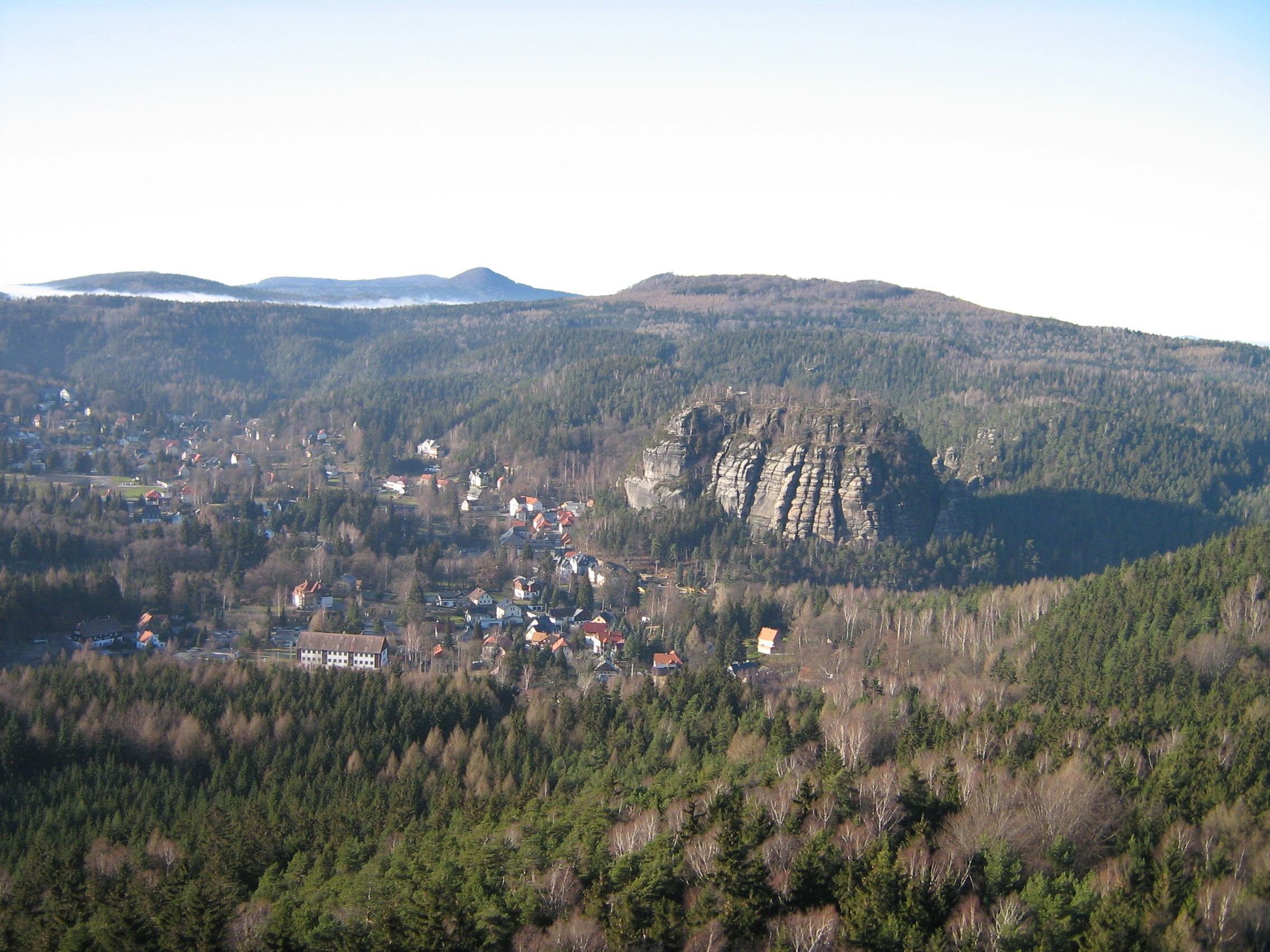
View from the summit of Scharfenstein to the town of Oybin and Mount Lausche
