= Jonsberg (Zittau Mountains) =

Mountain in Germany

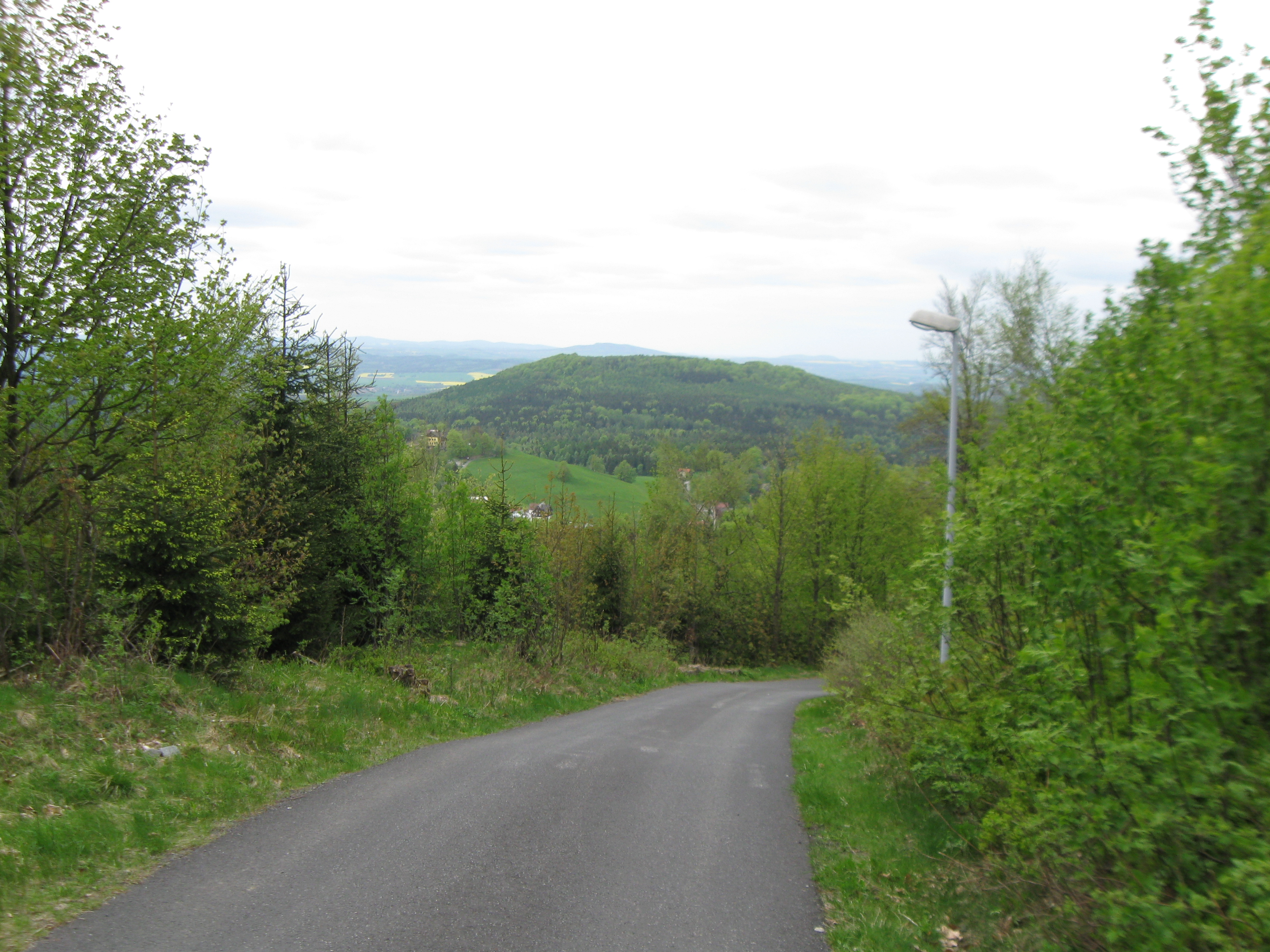

Highest point
- Elevation: 652 m (2,139 ft)
- Coordinates: 50°50′55″N 14°42′59″E

Geography
- Location within Saxony
- Location: Saxony, Germany
- Parent range: Zittau Mountains

Jonsberg is a mountain of Saxony, southeastern Germany.
