= Grandhotel Zvon =

Hotel in the Czech Republic

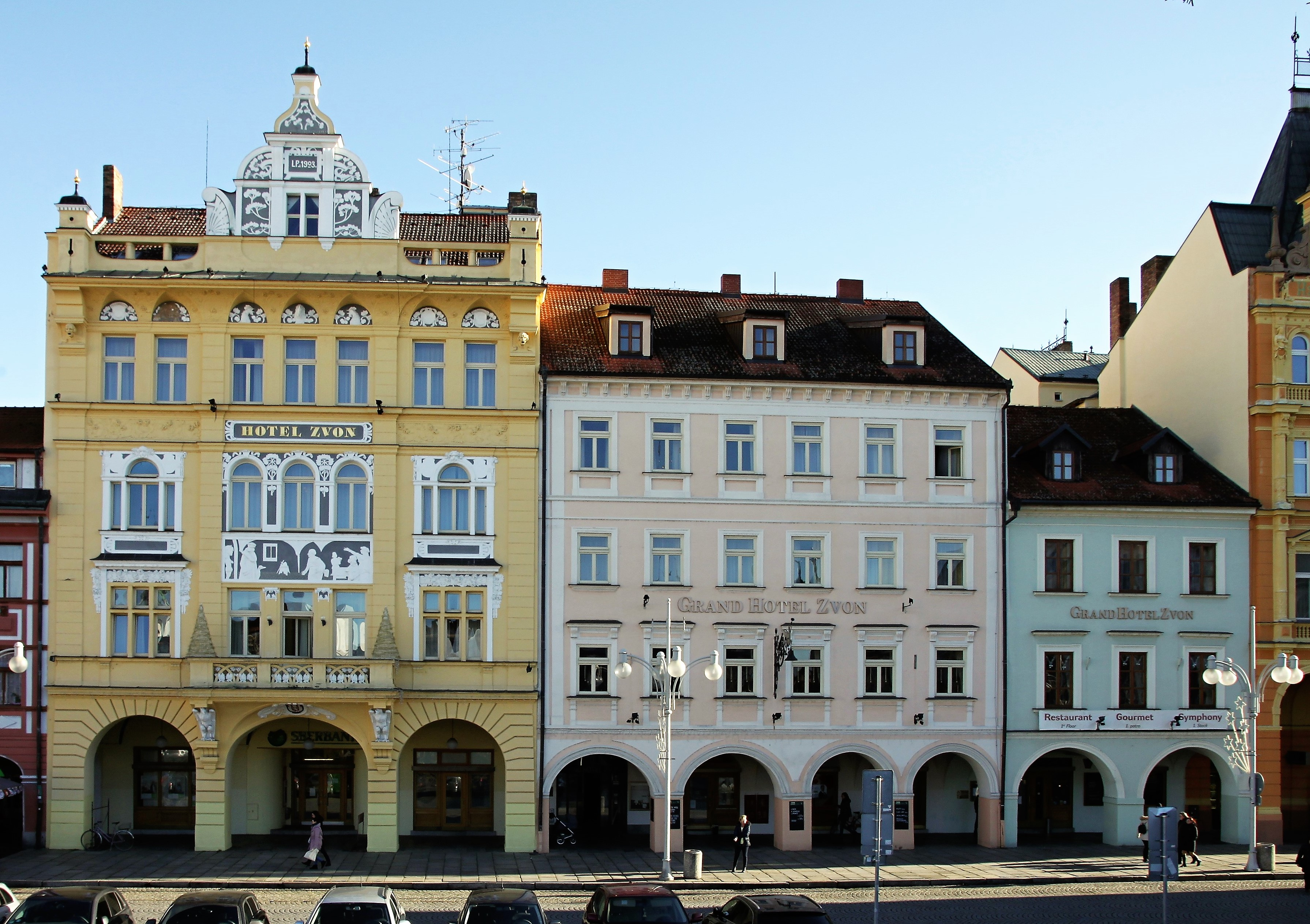
- Grandhotel Zvon
- Interactive map of the Grandhotel Zvon area

General information
- Location: Nám. Přemysla Otakara II. 90/28, České Budějovice, 370 01, Czech Republic
- Coordinates: 48°58′27.12″N 14°28′31.08″E
- Opening: 1533

Website
- www.hotel-zvon.cz

The Grandhotel Zvon is the oldest hotel in the Czech Republic, founded in 1533 and located in the city of České Budějovice.

In 2006-2007, it was reconstructed. The hotel now offers 148 beds in 65 rooms. The hotel building also offers various services and houses a number of shops.

== See also ==
- List of oldest companies
