= Oybin (hill) =

Mountain in Germany

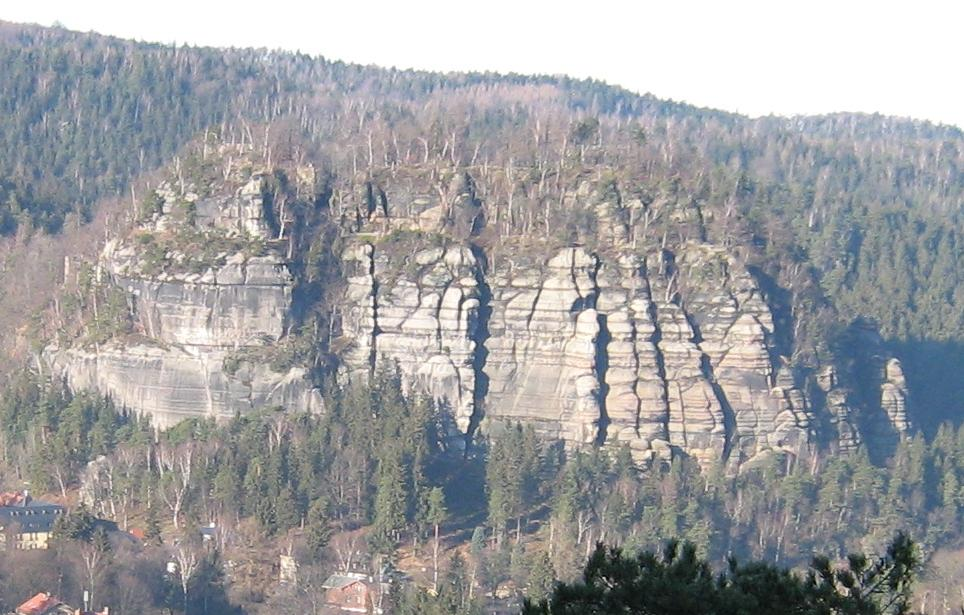
- Oybin

Highest point
- Elevation: 514 m (1,686 ft)
- Coordinates: 50°50′40″N 14°44′24″E

Geography
- Location: Saxony, Germany
- Parent range: Zittau Mountains

Geology
- Mountain type(s): Rock with castle and monastery ruins

The Oybin (Upper Sorbian: Ojbin) is a hill in Saxony, southeastern Germany, near by the city of Zittau and it is part of the Zittau Mountains.

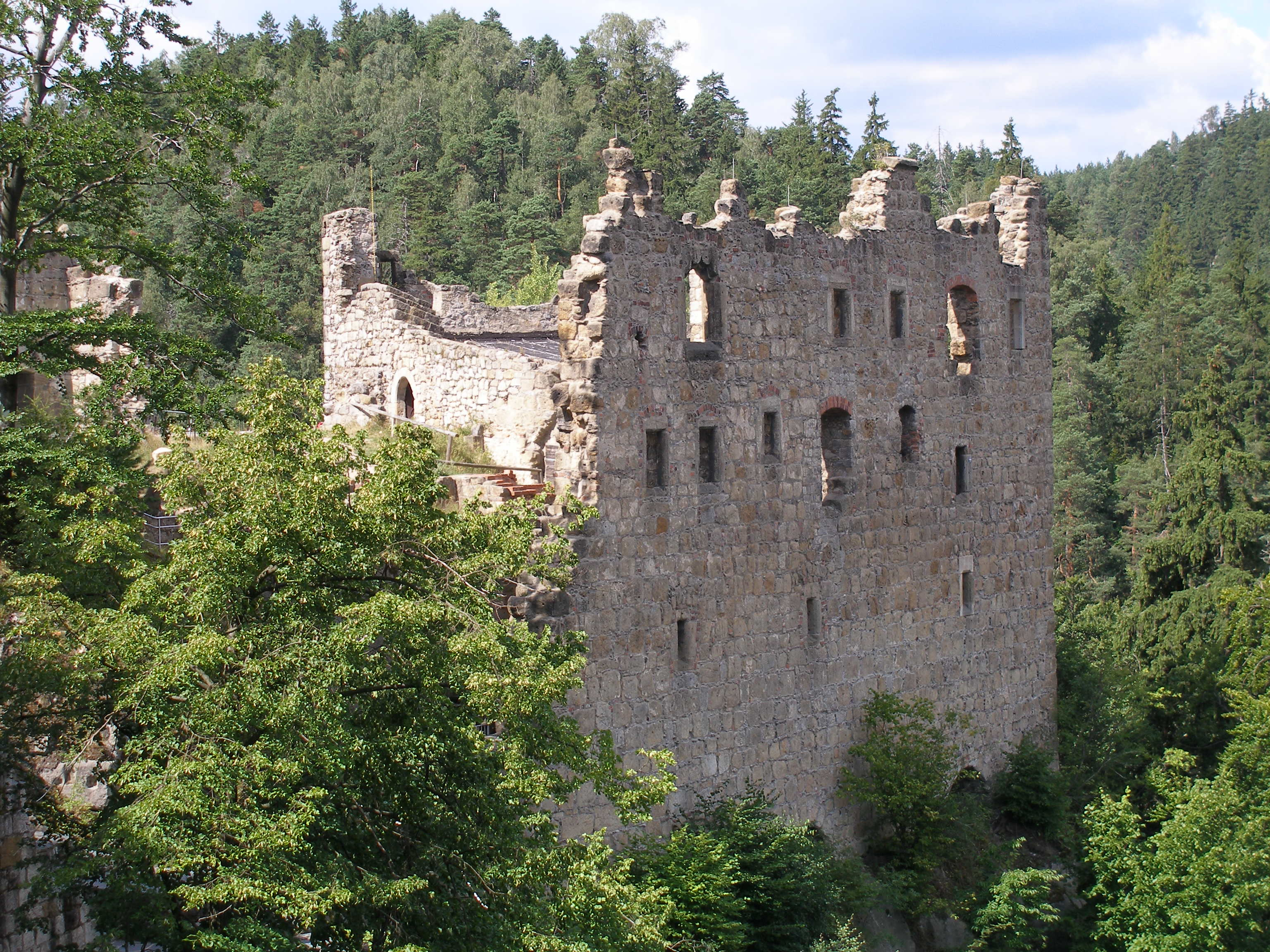
Remains of the castle

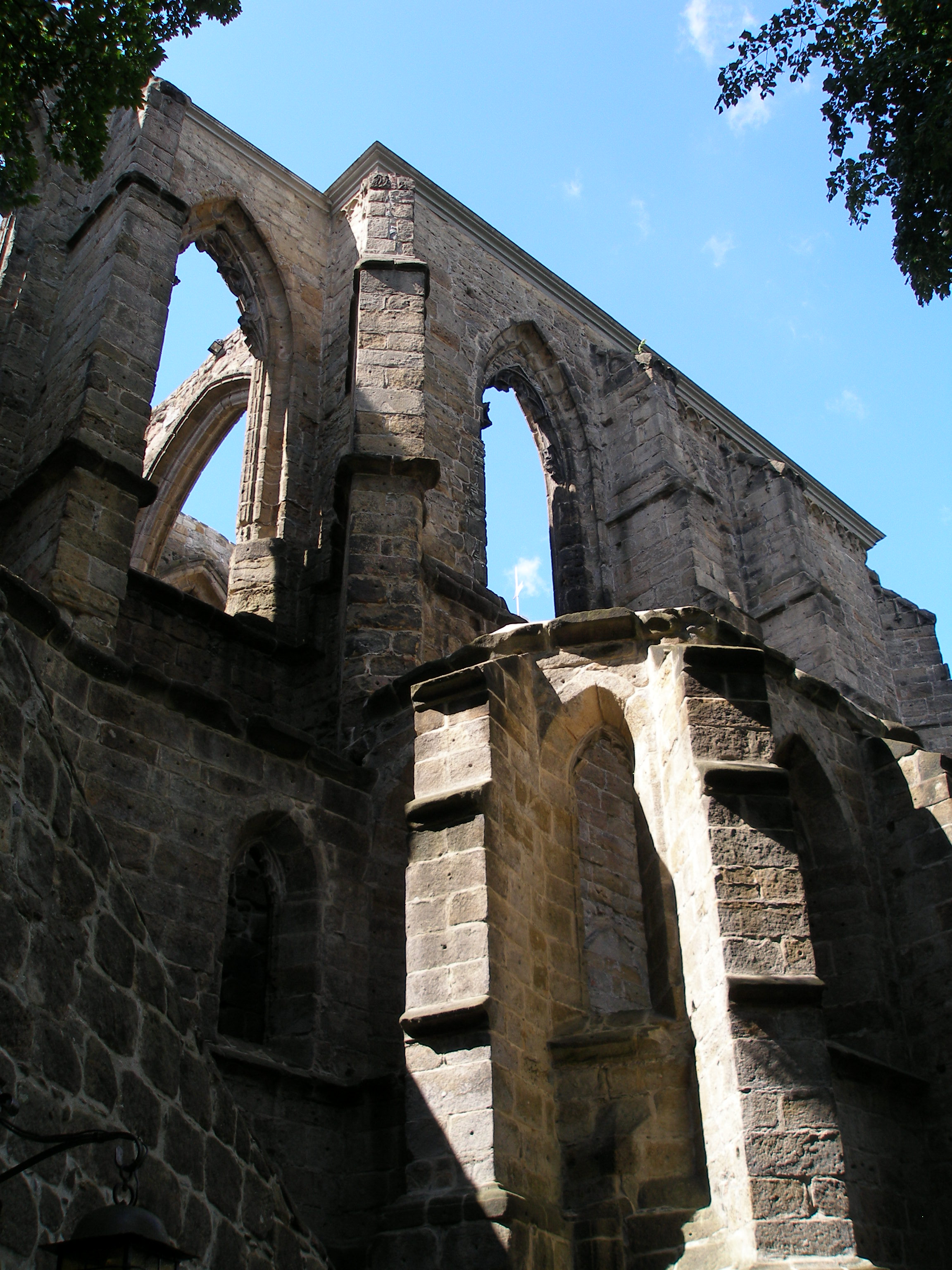
Remains of the monastery

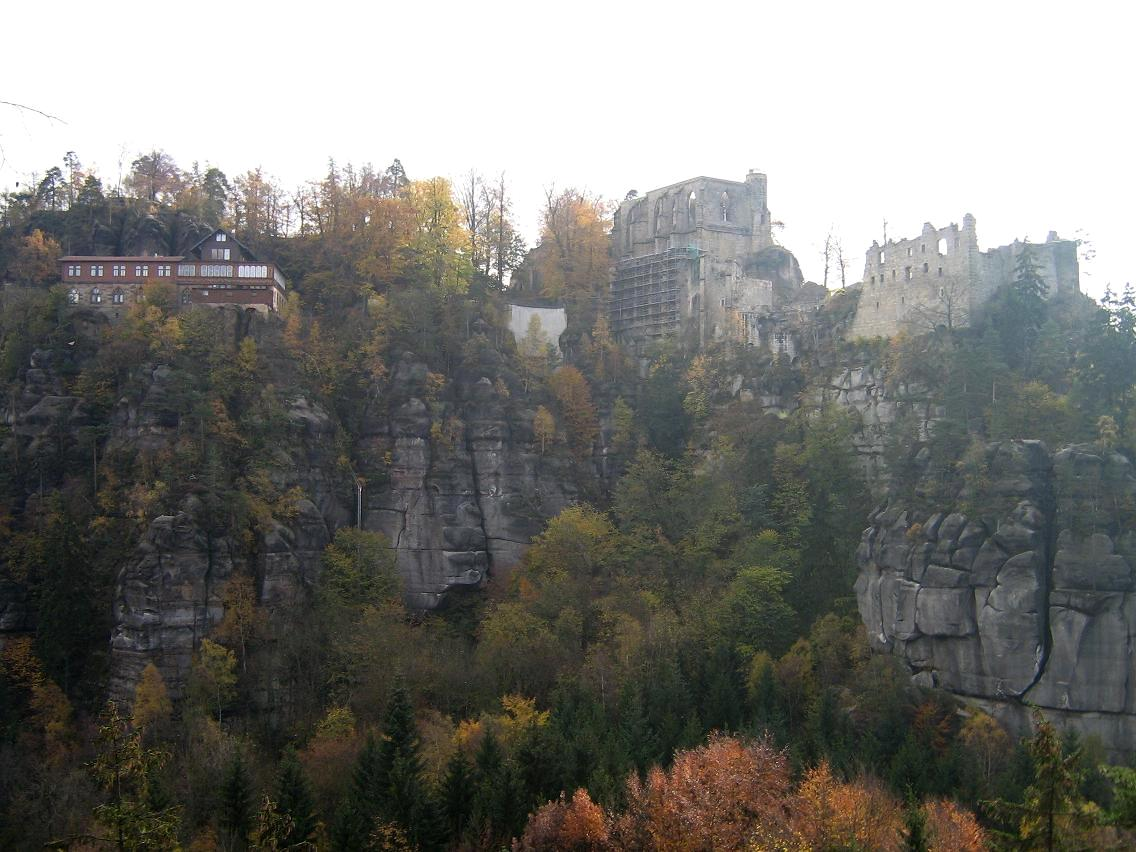
Oybin with restaurant and ruins of the monastery and castle

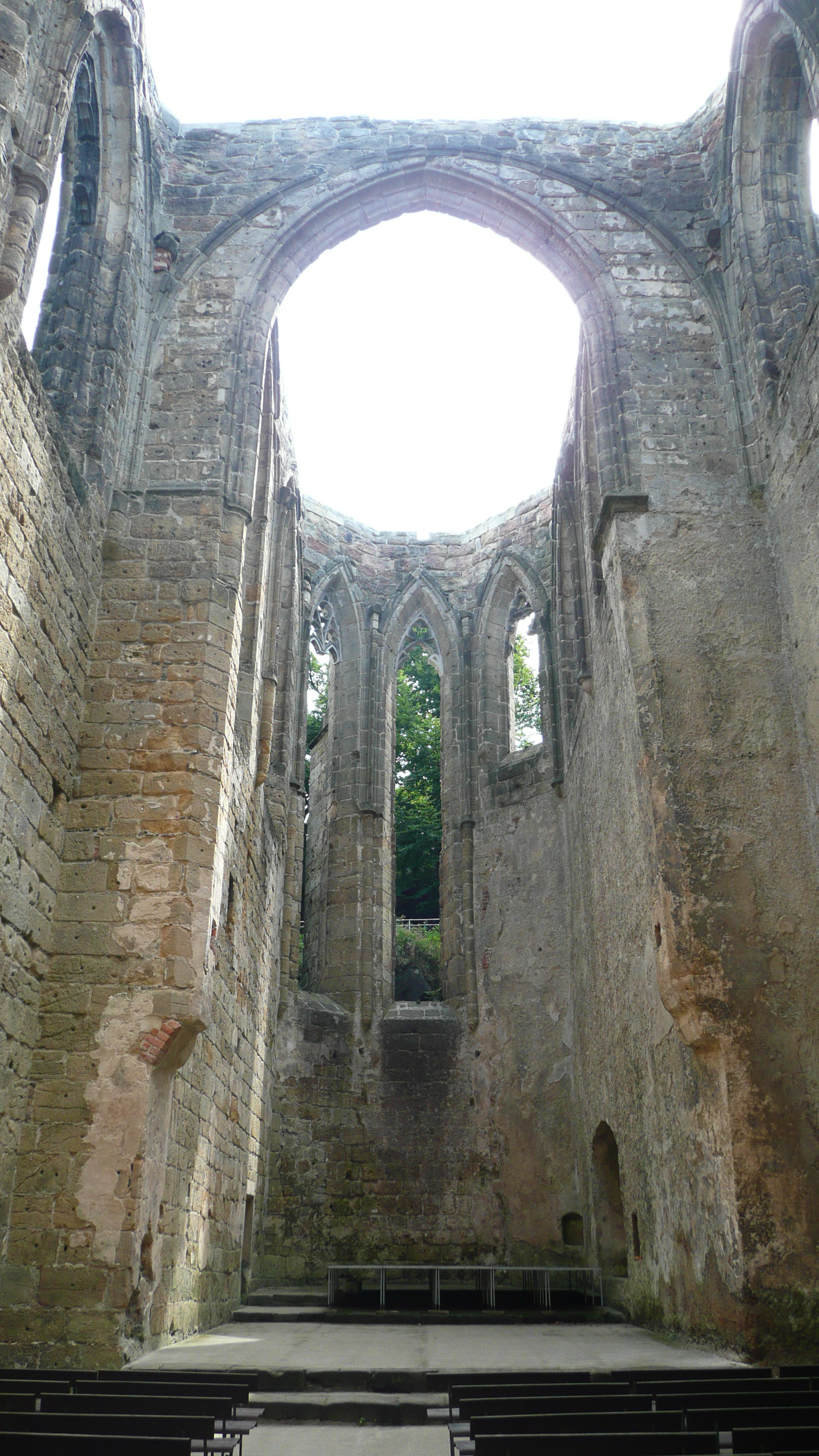
Remains of the church

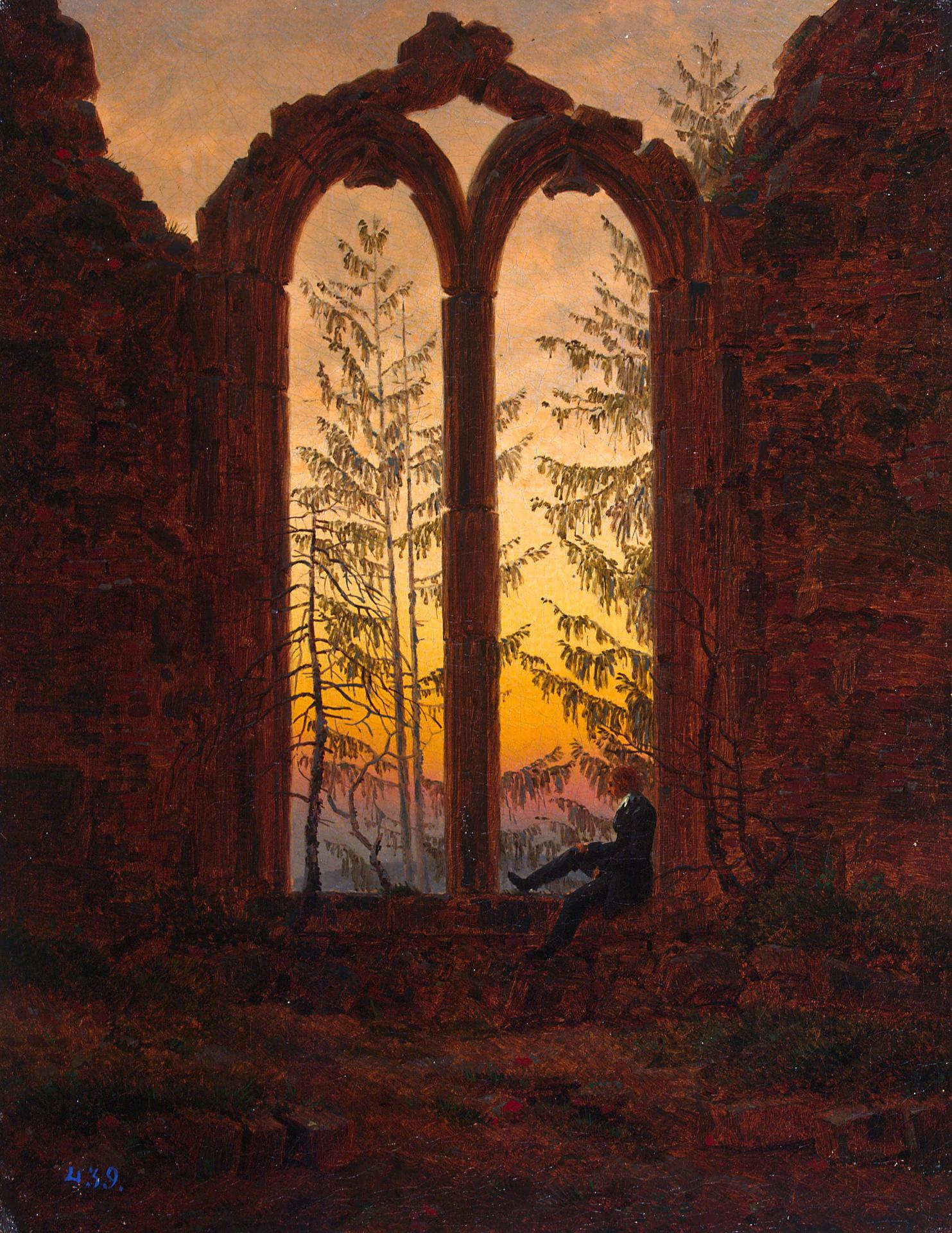
Caspar David Friedrich: "Der Träumer - Klosterruine Oybin" (1835)
