= Verkehrsgesellschaft Görlitz =

Former public transport operator in Saxony, Germany

- Verkehrsgesellschaft Görlitz GmbH

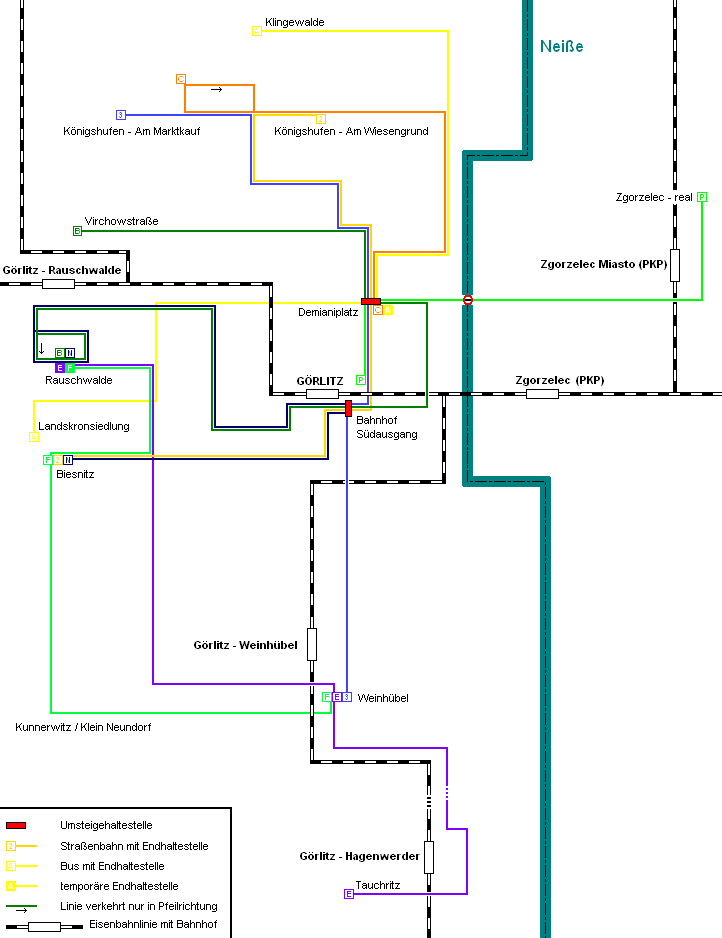
- VGG routes map, 2010
- Abbreviation: VGG
- Established: 1996; 30 years ago
- Type: Public transport operator
- Location: Görlitz, Germany
- Region served: Saxony
- Parent organisation: Transdev Germany
- Affiliations: ZVON
- Budget: €3,218,507.58 (2005)
- Funding: Public

The Verkehrsgesellschaft Görlitz GmbH (VGG) was a public transport operator based in Görlitz, Saxony. VGG was co-owned by Transdev Germany (49%) and the town council of Görlitz (51%), and was a member of ZVON transport association.

== History ==
VGG was founded in 1996 as a subsidiary of the public services company Stadtwerke Görlitz, then wholly owned by the town council. In April 2001, the town council decided to sell the majority of its shares in Stadtwerke Görlitz to Vivendi Environnement, known since 2003 as Veolia. As part of this deal, VGG became co-owned by Connex (later known as Veolia Transport; since 2011, part of Transdev Germany).

== Operations ==
VGG did operate the two tram lines and six bus routes in Görlitz.

In 2005, the operator carried 4,217,222 passengers, corresponding to 13,916,833 person-kilometers. Throughout 2010, the operator's services amounted to a total of 556,000 km on the two tram lines, and a total of 504,000 km on the bus routes. In the same year, the subsidies from the town council to VVG amounted to €3,218,507.58.

A study, performed in 1997 by the Görlitz town council and funded by the state of Saxony, confirmed that the share of public transport in the overall urban traffic in Görlitz is higher (16%) than in other cities in eastern Saxony, such as Bautzen (about 8%).
