= Jonsdorf =

- Municipality
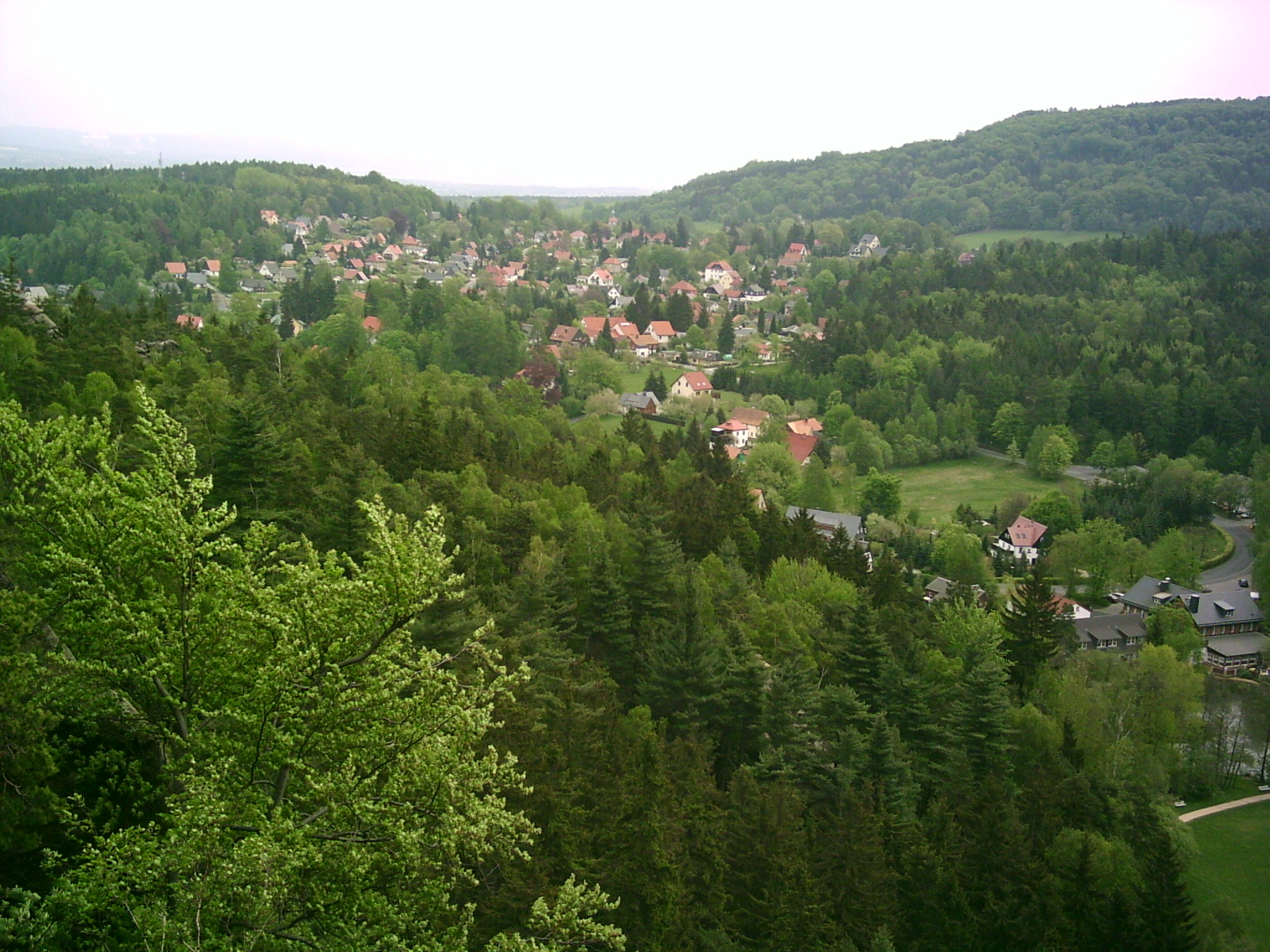

- Coat of arms

- Location of Jonsdorf within Görlitz district
- Interactive map of Jonsdorf
- Location within Germany Location within Saxony
- Coordinates: 50°51′10″N 14°42′10″E
- Country: Germany
- State: Saxony
- District: Görlitz

Government
  - Mayor (2019–26): Kati Wenzel

Area
  - Total: 9.08 km^{2} (3.51 sq mi)
- Elevation: 549 m (1,801 ft)

Population (2025-12-31)
  - Total: 1,408
  - Density: 155/km^{2} (402/sq mi)
- Time zone: UTC+01:00 (CET)
  - Summer (DST): UTC+02:00 (CEST)
- Postal codes: 02796
- Dialling codes: 035844
- Vehicle registration: GR, LÖB, NOL, NY, WSW, ZI
- Website: www.jonsdorf.de

The community of Jonsdorf is located in the south of the Kreis Görlitz in the southeast of the German federal state of Saxony. It is embedded into a valley of the Zittau Mountains, part of the Lusatian Mountains.

== History ==
In 1539 Jonsdorf was first mentioned in a document which showed the selling of land to ten new settlers by the monastery of Oybin. In 1547 the whole land of Oybin had been sold to the city of Zittau by Maximilian the Second.

In 1580 Hieronymus Richter established the first sandstone quarry inside the rock formations surrounding Jonsdorf to produce millstones. Some decades later, in 1667, the city-council of Zittau decided to found some additional quarries in the district between Jonsdorf and Waltersdorf. The production of millstone ended in 1917.

In the next years the two villages grew. After cutting down a forest between the villages of old and new Jonsdorf in 1731, both parts of the villages were unified. The construction of a church in Jonsdorf started in the same year.

Like many other villages and towns in Upper Lusatia, Jonsdorf established a special kind of industry in the 18th and 19th century - the weaving of linen. The first touristic development in the village started in 1841 when Karl Linke opened the first cold water cure house (Kaltwasseranstalt) applying hydrotherapy. The spa-tourism became more and more important in the years later. In 1890 a narrow-gauge railway link was opened between Zittau and Jonsdorf and helped the village to flourish.

After the end of World War II and the arrival of expelled Sudeten Germans from Bohemia, a small development programme was set up that included the construction of an icedome and a forest theatre in the 1950s. In 1984 a new school was opened. New projects after the reunification of Germany improved the economical structure even further. A leisure centre with an ice rink went into operation in 1996, and in 2004 a butterfly house (Schmetterlingshaus) was opened.

== Sights ==
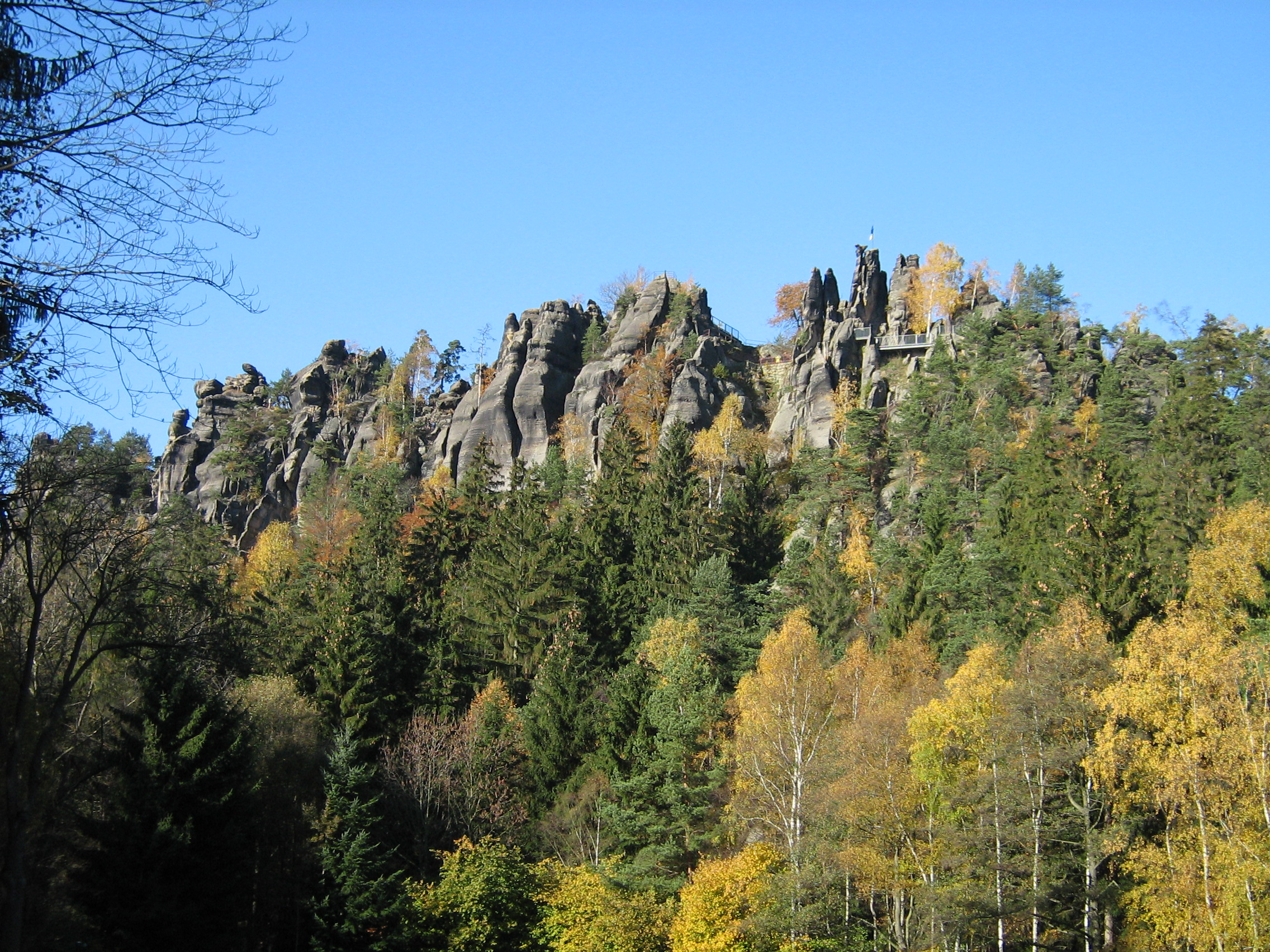
The Nonnenfelsen (Nun's Rock)

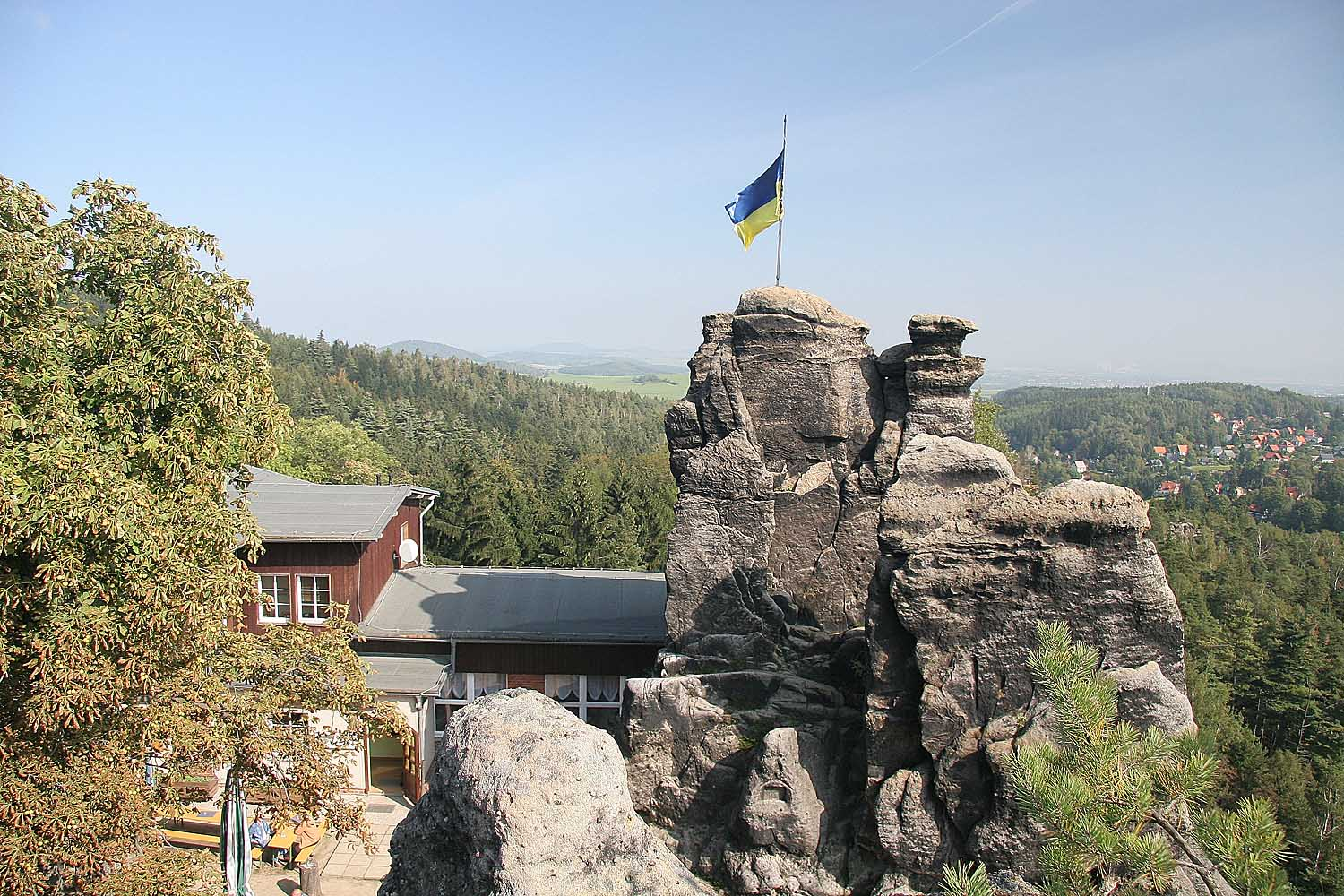
Mountain hut on the Nonnenfelsen (Nun's Rock)

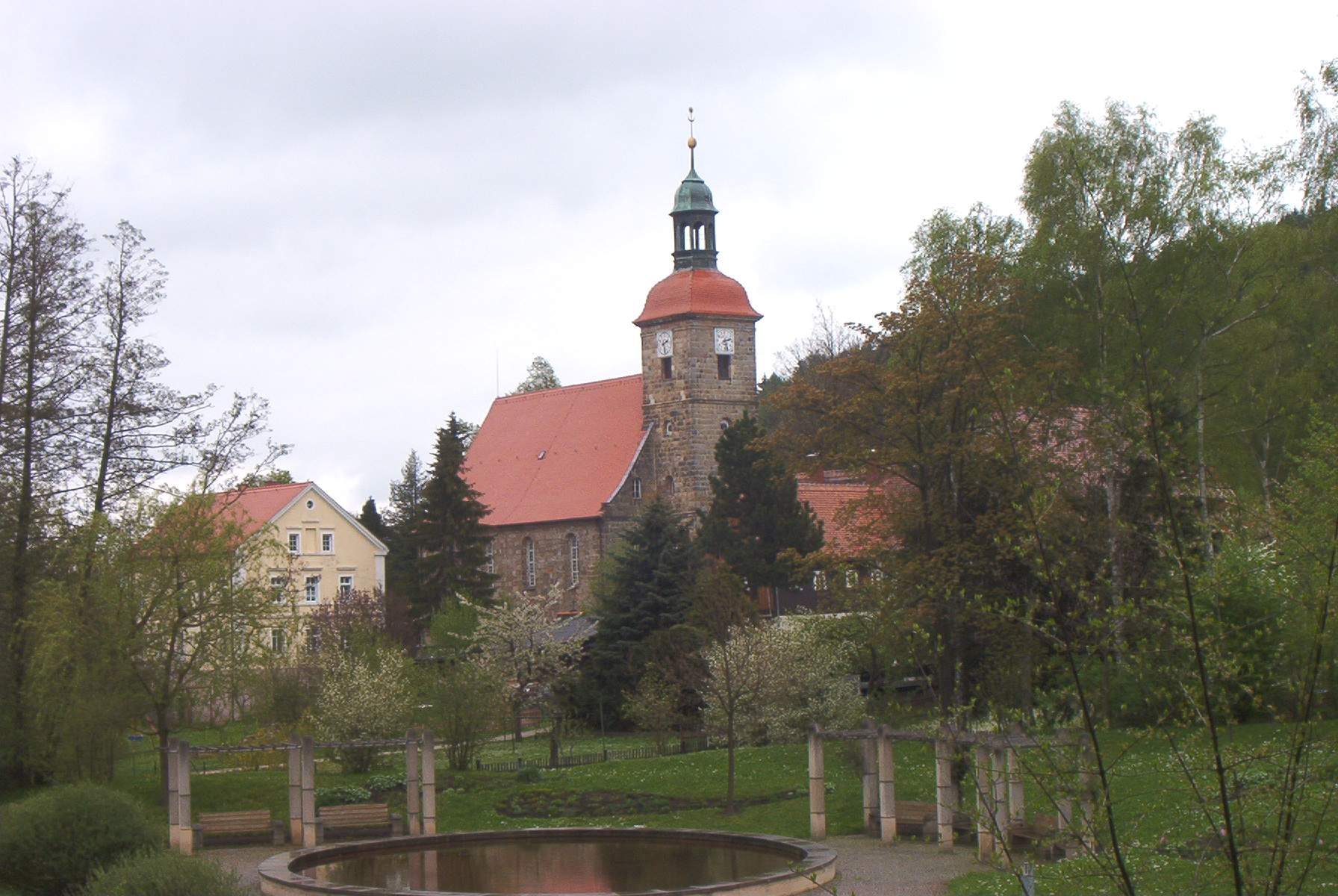
Church in Jonsdorf

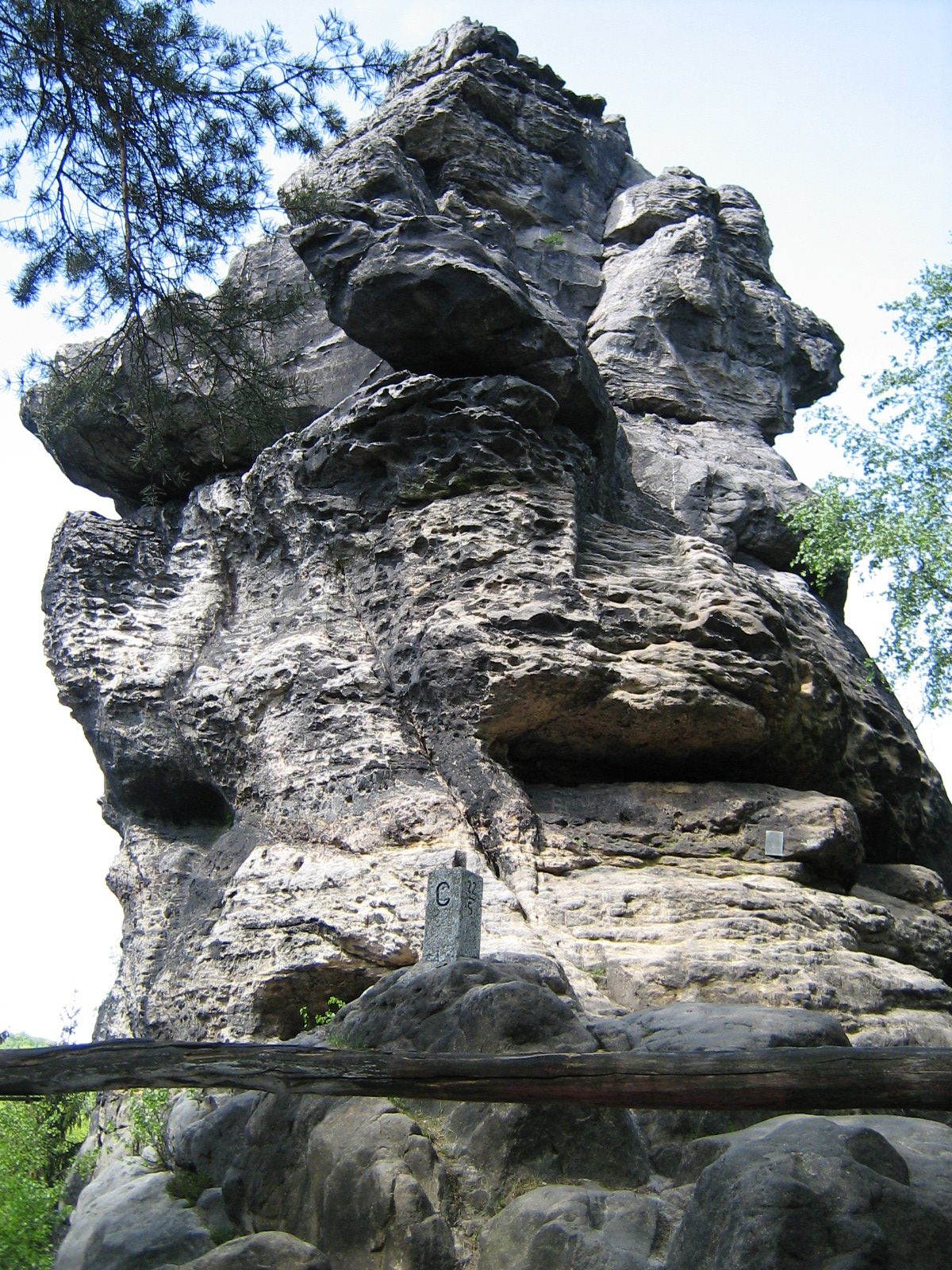
The Falkenstein (Hawk Stone Rock) on the German-Czech border

The village is surrounded by mountains and rock formations, which often have very bizarre shapes. The village itself offers some special institution out of the cure-tradition for example a park. There are also some of the old timber-frame houses (Umgebindehäuser) that may be of interest to tourists.

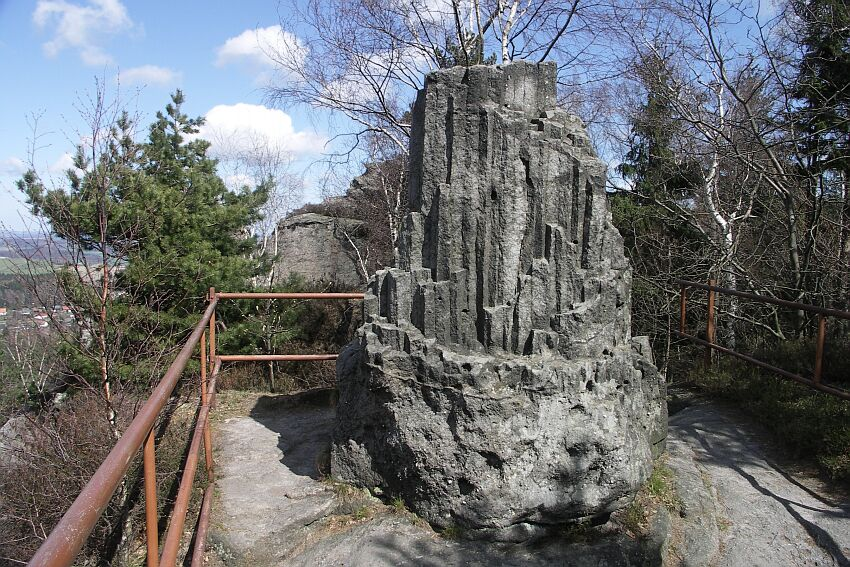
Small Organ (Kleine Orgel)

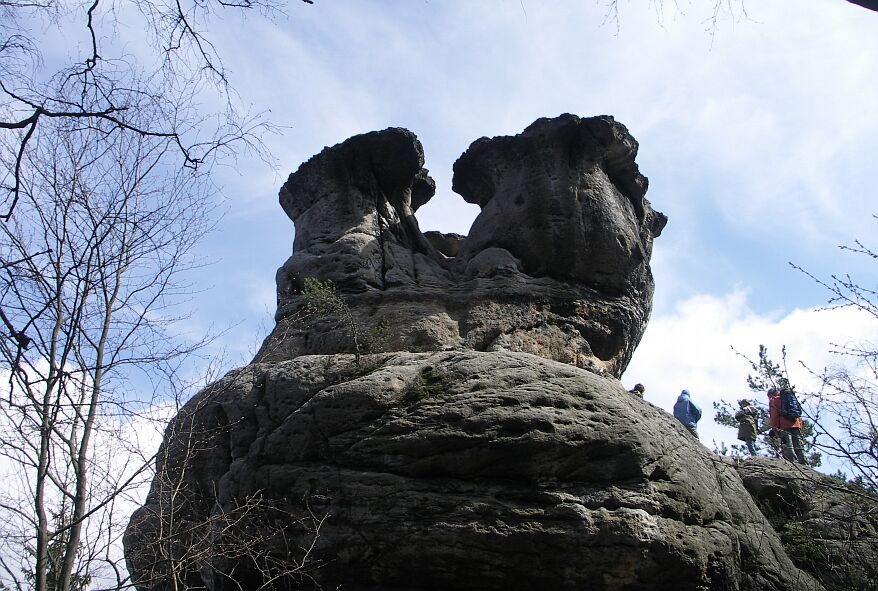
Three Tables (Drei Tische)

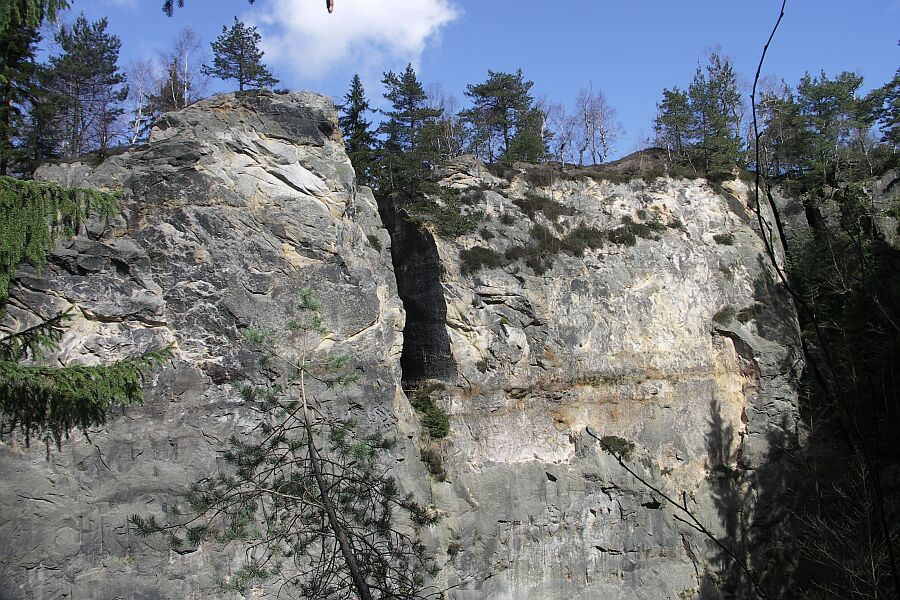
Black Hole (Schwarzes Loch)

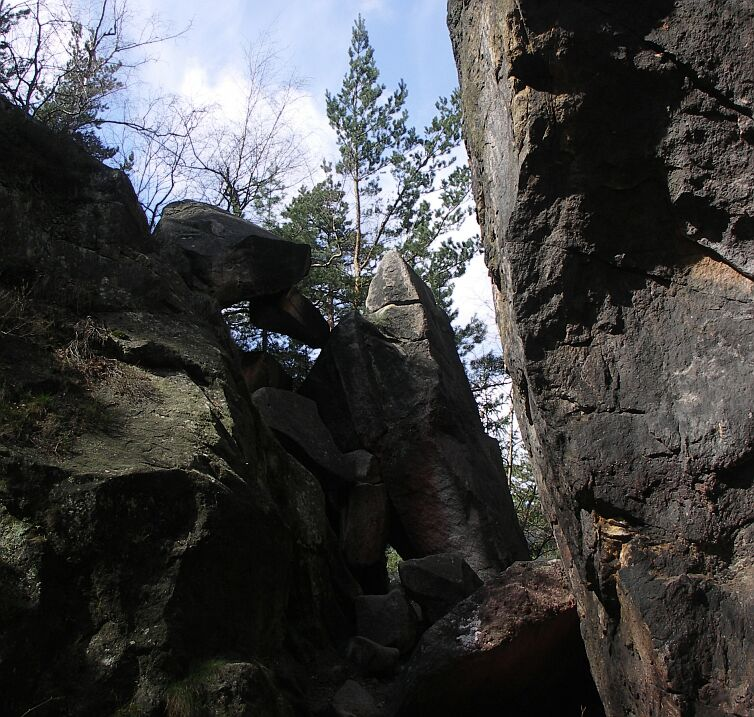
Mousetrap (Mausefalle)
