= Bertsdorf-Hörnitz =

- Municipality
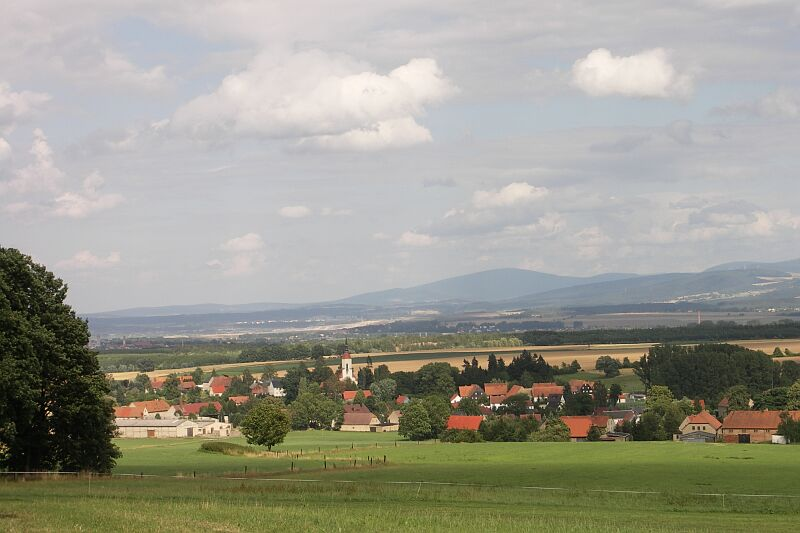

- Location of Bertsdorf-Hörnitz within Görlitz district
- Interactive map of Bertsdorf-Hörnitz
- Location within Germany Location within Saxony
- Coordinates: 50°53′20″N 14°44′30″E
- Country: Germany
- State: Saxony
- District: Görlitz
- Subdivisions: 2

Government
  - Mayor (2022–29): Günther Ohmann

Area
  - Total: 17.98 km^{2} (6.94 sq mi)
- Elevation: 309 m (1,014 ft)

Population (2025-12-31)
  - Total: 1,978
  - Density: 110.0/km^{2} (284.9/sq mi)
- Time zone: UTC+01:00 (CET)
  - Summer (DST): UTC+02:00 (CEST)
- Postal codes: 02763
- Dialling codes: 03583
- Vehicle registration: GR, LÖB, NOL, NY, WSW, ZI
- Website: bertsdorf-hoernitz.de

Bertsdorf-Hörnitz (Upper Sorbian: Bertzdorf-Hörnicy) is a municipality in the Görlitz district, Saxony, Germany.

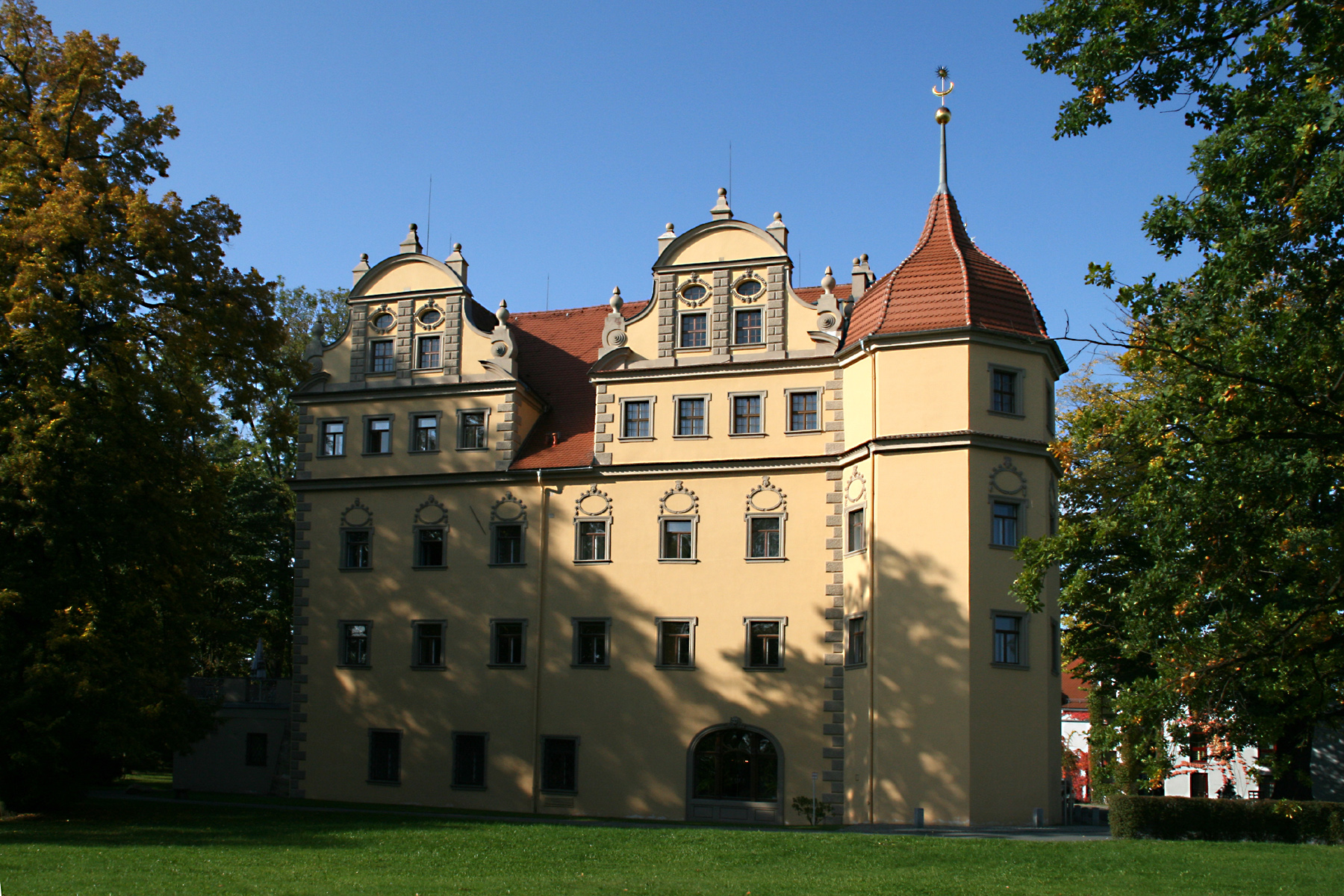
Althörnitz Castle

Althörnitz Castle was built between 1651 and 1654 for Christian von Hartig, mayor of Zittau. The von Sandersleben family owned it from 1881 until expropriation in 1945. It currently operates as a hotel.
