= Bohemian glass =

Regional glass product

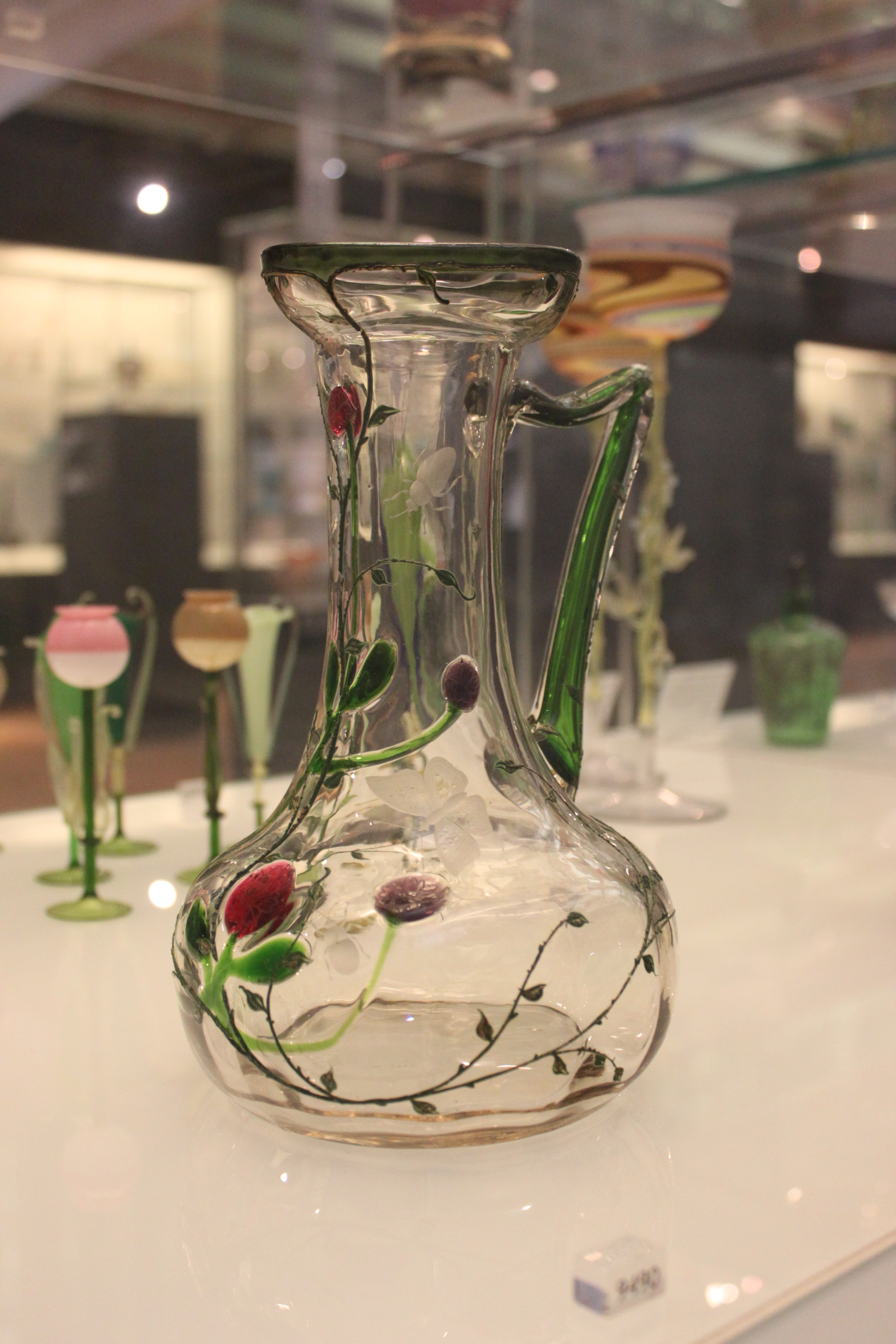
Bohemian jug. Produced in Karlsbad (Karlovy Vary) by L. Moser & Söhne (c. 1900)

Bohemian glass (Czech: české sklo), also referred to as Bohemia crystal (český křišťál), is glass produced in the regions of Bohemia and Silesia, now parts of the Czech Republic. It has a centuries-long history of being internationally recognised for its high quality, craftsmanship, beauty and often innovative designs. Hand-cut, engraved, blown and painted decorative glassware ranging from champagne flutes to enormous chandeliers, ornaments, figurines and other glass items are among the best known Czech exports and popular as tourist souvenirs. The Czech Republic is home to numerous glass studios and schools attended by local and foreign students.

The oldest archaeological excavations of glass-making sites in the region date to around 1250 and are located in the Lusatian Mountains of Northern Bohemia. Other notable Czech sites of glass-making throughout the ages are Skalice u České Lípy, Jablonec nad Nisou, Železný Brod, Poděbrady, Karlovy Vary, Kamenický Šenov and Nový Bor. Several of these towns have their own glass museums with many items dating to around 1600. Jablonec nad Nisou in particular is famous for the local tradition of manufacturing glass costume jewellery. Its long history is documented by large collections in the Museum of Glass and Jewellery in Jablonec nad Nisou.

Among the most famous Czech glass producers are: Moser (considered the most luxurious Czech brand), Rückl (the glass from them was owned, for example, by the British Queen Elizabeth II), and Crystalex (the largest Czech producer of drinking glasses, own trademark Bohemia Crystal).

== Crystal vs. glass ==
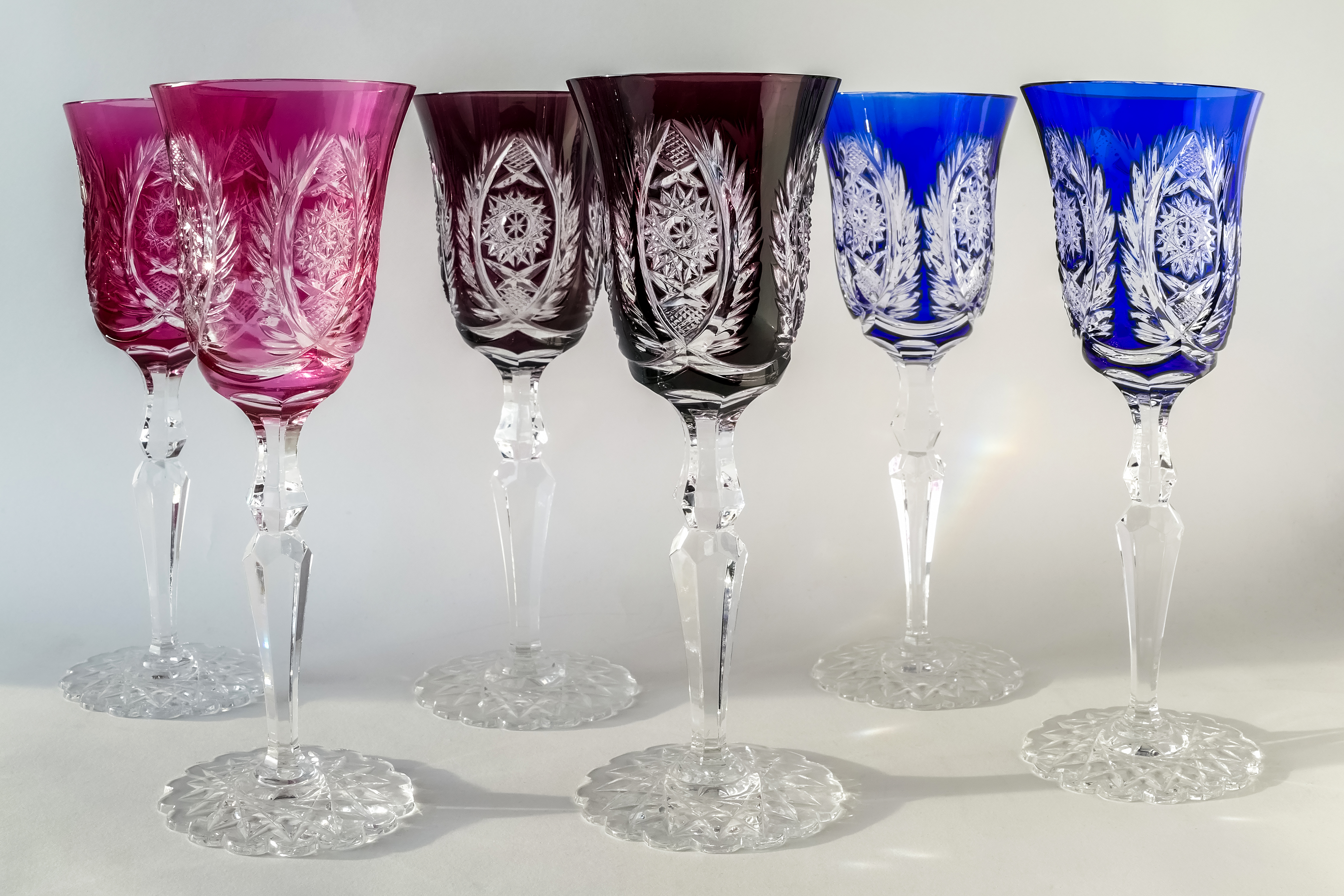
Cut crystal wine glasses in the "Fakiris" series by the FA Knittel, Reinerzer Kristallglaswerke, in cameo glass technique.

Originally a vessel of "crystal" exclusively meant one carved from the transparent mineral rock crystal, an extravagant and highly expensive object. The glass industry appropriated the term for glass objects. The modern meaning of crystal versus glass changes according to the country. The word "crystal" means, in most of the Western world, lead glass, containing lead oxide. In the European Union, the labeling of "crystal" products is regulated by Council Directive 69/493/EEC, which defines four categories, depending on the chemical composition and properties of the material. Only glass products containing at least 24% lead oxide may be referred to as "lead crystal". Products with less lead oxide, or glass products with other metal oxides used in place of lead oxide, must be labeled "crystallin" or "crystal glass". In the United States it is the opposite: glass is defined as "crystal" if it contains only 1% lead.

The presence of lead in crystal softens the glass and makes it more accessible for cutting and engraving. Lead increases the weight of the glass and causes the glass to disperse light more. Glass can contain up to 40% lead, if maximum hardness is desired. On the other hand, crystal can contain less than 24% lead if it has a high proportion of barium oxide, which ensures high quality light diffraction. The term "half-crystal" has been used within glassmaking for glass with a relatively low level of lead.

== History ==
Bohemia, currently a part of the Czech Republic, became famous for its beautiful and colourful glass during the Renaissance. The history of Bohemian glass started with the abundant natural resources found in the countryside. Bohemian glass-workers discovered potash combined with chalk created a clear colourless glass that was more stable than glass from Italy. In the 16th century the term Bohemian crystal was used for the first time to distinguish its qualities from glass made elsewhere. This glass contained no lead as is commonly suspected. This Czech glass could be cut with a wheel. Resources such as wood for firing the kilns and for burning down to ashes were used to create potash. There were copious amounts of limestone and silica. In the 17th century, Caspar Lehmann, gem cutter to Emperor Rudolf II in Prague, adapted to glass the technique of gem engraving with copper and bronze wheels. During the era, the Czech lands became the dominant producer of decorative glassware, and the local manufacture of glass earned international reputation in high Baroque style from 1685 to 1750.

Czech glassware became as prestigious as jewellery and was sought after by the wealthy and the aristocracy of the time. Czech crystal chandeliers could be found in the palaces of King Louis XV, Maria Theresa and Elizabeth of Russia.

Bohemia turned out expert craftsmen who artfully worked with crystal. Bohemian crystal became famous for its excellent cut and engraving. They became skilled teachers of glass-making in neighbouring and distant countries. Lithyalin glass, a type of opaque decorative glass designed to imitate semiprecious stones, was invented by glassmaker Friedrich Egermann, who patented the process in 1828. By the middle of the 19th century, a technical glass-making school system was created that encouraged traditional and innovative techniques as well as thorough technical preparation.

In the second half of the 19th century, Bohemia looked to the export trade and mass-produced coloured glass that was exported all over the world. Pairs of vases were produced either in a single colour of opaque glass or in two-colour cased glass. These were decorated in thickly enamelled flower subjects that were painted with great speed. Others were decorated with coloured lithographic prints copying famous paintings. These glass objects were made in huge quantities in large factories and were available by mail order throughout Europe and America. Many of them were not fine art but provided inexpensive decorative objects to brighten up ordinary homes. Reverse glass painting was also a Czech specialty. The image is carefully painted by hand on the back of a pane of glass, using a variety of techniques and materials, after which the painting is mounted in a bevelled wooden frame.

Glass artisanship remained at a high level even under the communists because it was considered ideologically innocuous and it helped promote the good name of the country. Czech glass designers and manufacturers enjoyed international recognition, and Czech glassware—including art works such as sculptures—was displayed and awarded in many international exhibitions, most notably in Expo 58 world fair in Brussels and in Expo 67 in Montréal.

== Current use ==
Czech crystal chandeliers hang, for example, in Milan's La Scala, in Rome's Teatro dell'Opera, in Versailles palace, in the Hermitage Museum of Saint Petersburg, in Jerusalem's Belz Great Synagogue, and more recently inside the royal palace in Riyadh. Various sorts of glassware, art glass, ornaments, figurines, costume jewelry, beads and others also remain internationally valued.

One of the glass items for which the Czech nation is still well known is the production of "druk" beads. Druks are small (3mm-18mm) round glass beads with small threading holes produced in a wide variety of colors and finishes and used mainly as spacers among beaded jewellery makers.
