= Nižbor =

- Municipality
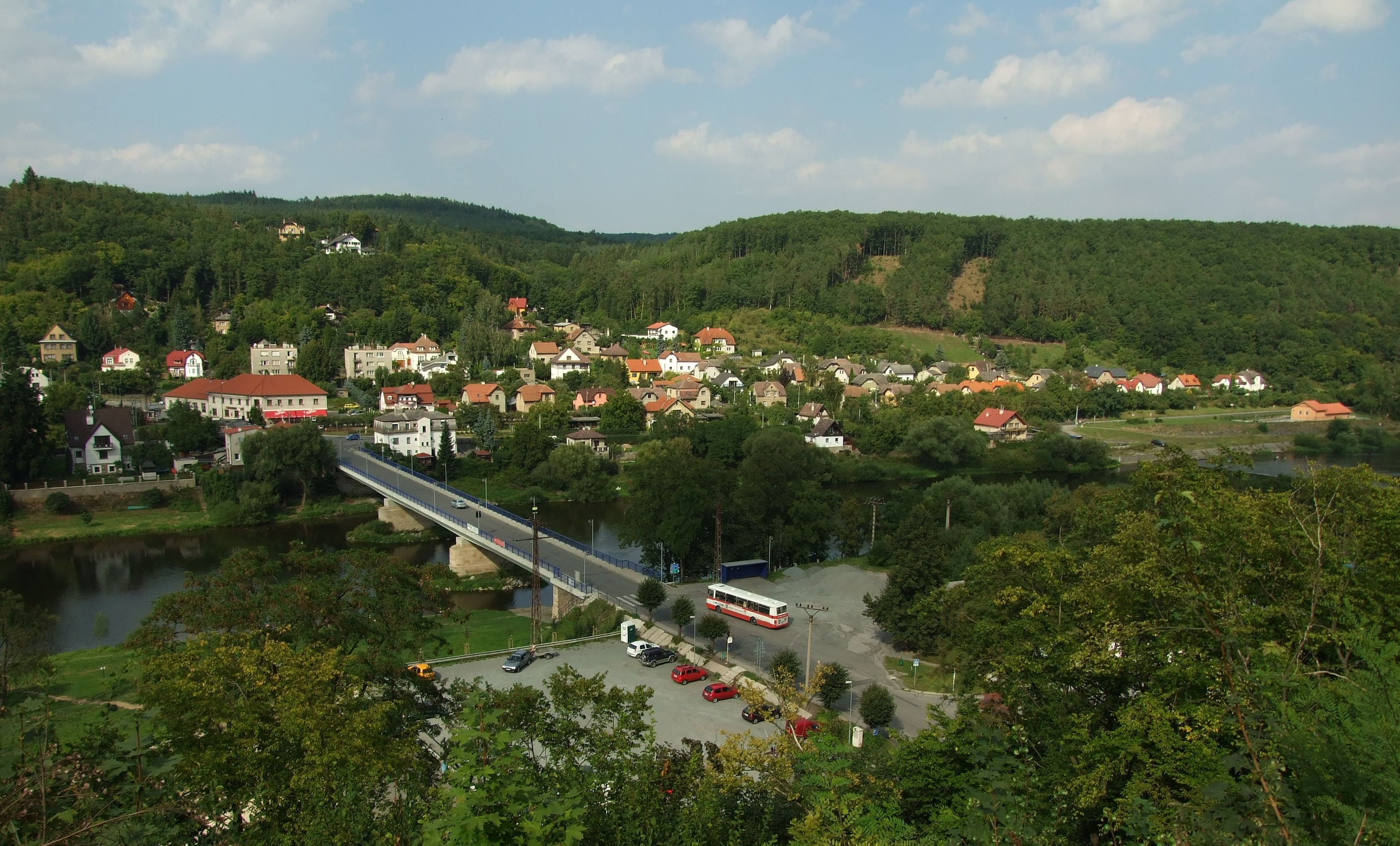
- Northern part of Nižbor

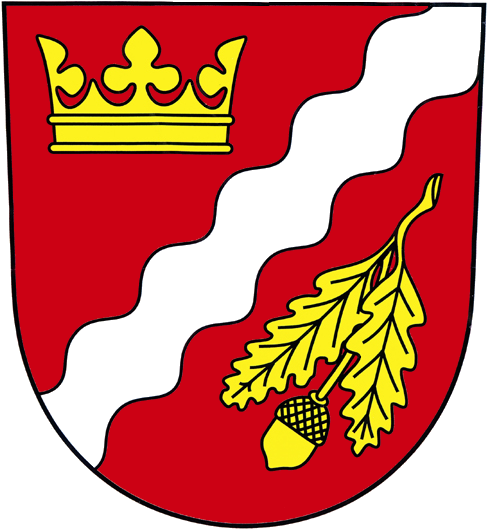
- Flag Coat of arms

- Location in the Czech Republic
- Coordinates: 50°0′0″N 14°0′9″E
- Country: Czech Republic
- Region: Central Bohemian
- District: Beroun
- First mentioned: 1265

Area
  - Total: 28.01 km^{2} (10.81 sq mi)
- Elevation: 235 m (771 ft)

Population (2026-01-01)
  - Total: 2,109
  - Density: 75.29/km^{2} (195.0/sq mi)
- Time zone: UTC+1 (CET)
  - Summer (DST): UTC+2 (CEST)
- Postal code: 267 05
- Website: www.obecnizbor.cz

Nižbor (German: Nischburg) is a municipality and village in Beroun District in the Central Bohemian Region of the Czech Republic. It has about 2,100 inhabitants.

== Administrative division ==
Nižbor consists of three municipal parts (in brackets population according to the 2021 census):

- Nižbor (1,368)
- Stradonice (427)
- Žloukovice (295)

== Etymology ==
The initial German name of the local castle was Miesenburg, meaning 'castle upon the Mže'. Later it was distorted to the Czech name Nižbor.

== Geography ==
Nižbor is located about 6 kilometres (4 mi) northwest of Beroun and 24 km (15 mi) west of Prague. It lies in the Křivoklát Highlands, in the Křivoklátsko Protected Landscape Area. The highest point is the hill Lísek at 483 m (1,585 ft) above sea level. The Berounka River flows through the municipality.

== History ==
The first written mention of Nižbor is from 1265, when Nižbor Castle was founded by King Ottokar II. The castle became an important centre of the region. In 1425, it was conquered by the Hussites. Nižbor was a royal property until 1601. From 1510 to 1601, however, it was granted to the Otta of Los family. During their rule, an iron smelter was established here and there was an influx of new inhabitants.

In 1601–1613, Nižbor was owned by the Šanovec family, who had rebuilt the castle. The Waldstein family acquired the estate during the Thirty Years' War and annexed it to the neighbouring Křivoklát estate. In 1731, the Waldsteins sold the Křivoklát estate with Nižbor to the Fürstenberg family, who owned it until 1929.

== Demographics ==
Historical population

Year	Pop.	±%
1869	2,374	—
1880	2,178	−8.3%
1890	1,962	−9.9%
1900	1,977	+0.8%
1910	2,148	+8.6%

Year	Pop.	±%
1921	1,886	−12.2%
1930	1,770	−6.2%
1950	1,639	−7.4%
1961	1,822	+11.2%
1970	1,760	−3.4%

Year	Pop.	±%
1980	1,746	−0.8%
1991	1,453	−16.8%
2001	1,499	+3.2%
2011	1,885	+25.8%
2021	2,090	+10.9%

Source: Censuses

== Economy ==
Nižbor is known for the Nižbor glassworks, a Bohemian crystal factory founded in 1903.

== Transport ==
Nižbor is located on the railway line Beroun–Rakovník.

== Sights ==
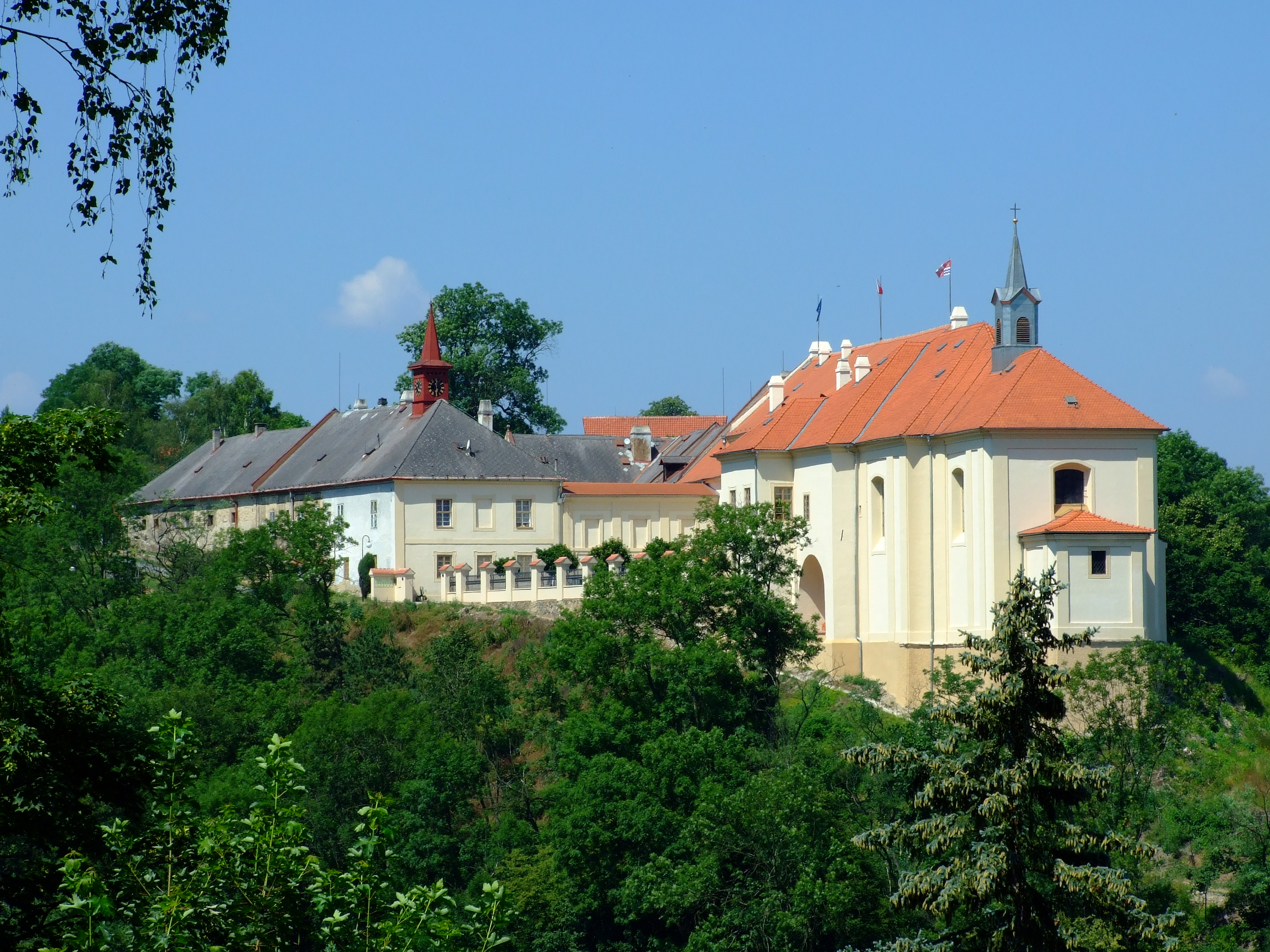
Nižbor Castle and the church

The most important monument is the Nižbor Castle. The original medieval castle was rebuilt into a Renaissance residence n the early 17th century, then it was completely rebuilt in the Baroque style in 1720–1725. It was rebuilt by the architect František Maxmilián Kaňka. Today the castle is open to the public. It houses the Information Centre of Celtic Culture.

The Church of the Exaltation of the Holy Cross was built in the Baroque style in 1724. It was built on the site of the Gothic castle chapel next to the castle.

A cultural monument is the Fürstenberg Tomb. The burial ground of the Fürstenberg family with a number of sepulchral objects was built from 1787 until the mid-19th century.
