= Jánské kameny =

Coordinates: 50°50′04″N 14°43′05″E

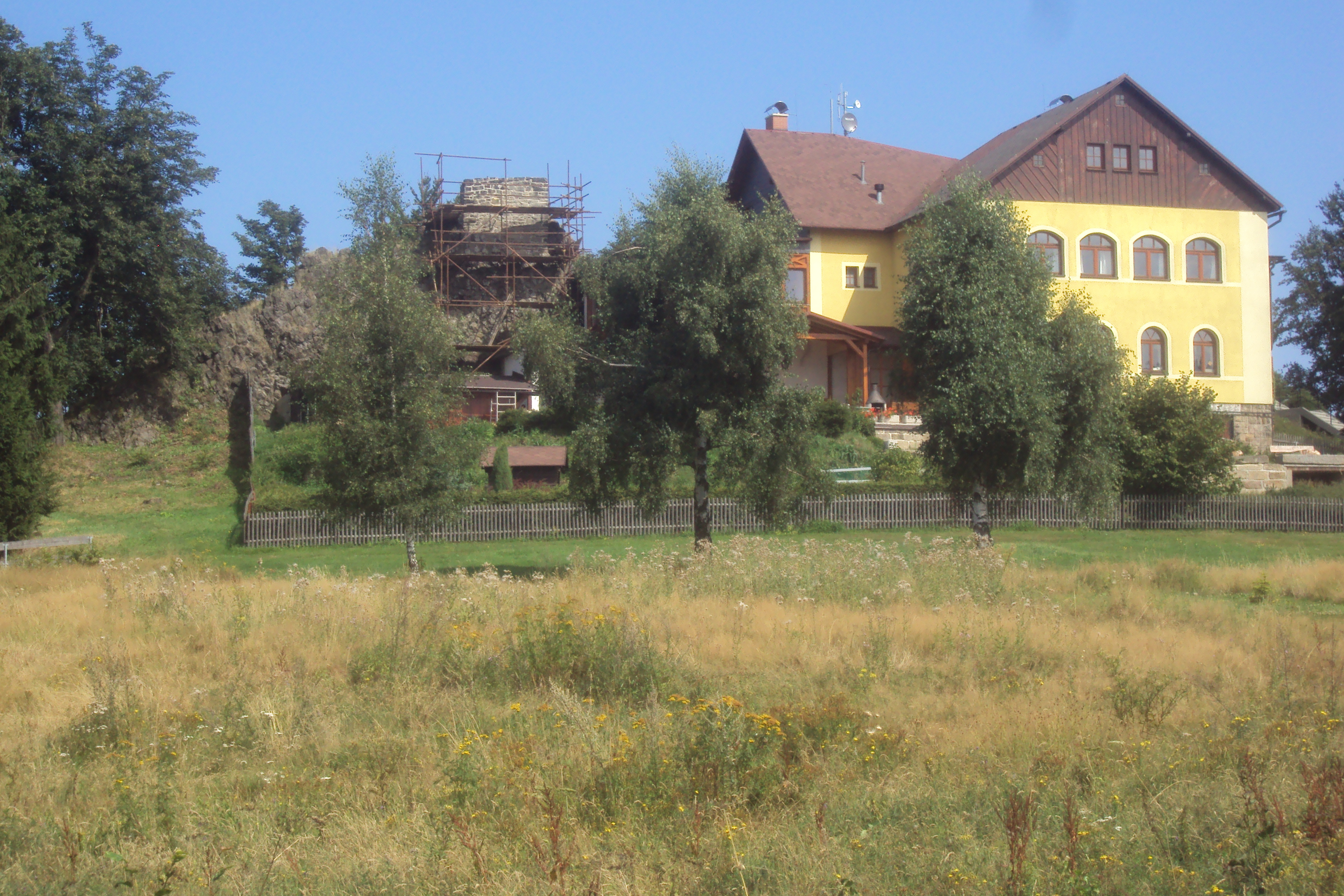
- Jánské kameny

Geography
- Location: Czech Republic / Germany
- Parent range: Lusatian Mountains

Jánské kameny (German: Johannisstein) is a mountain in the Lusatian Mountains, on the border of Germany and the Czech Republic.
