= Lausche =

Mountain on the Germany–Czech Republic border

- German: Lausche; Polish: Luz; Czech: Luž
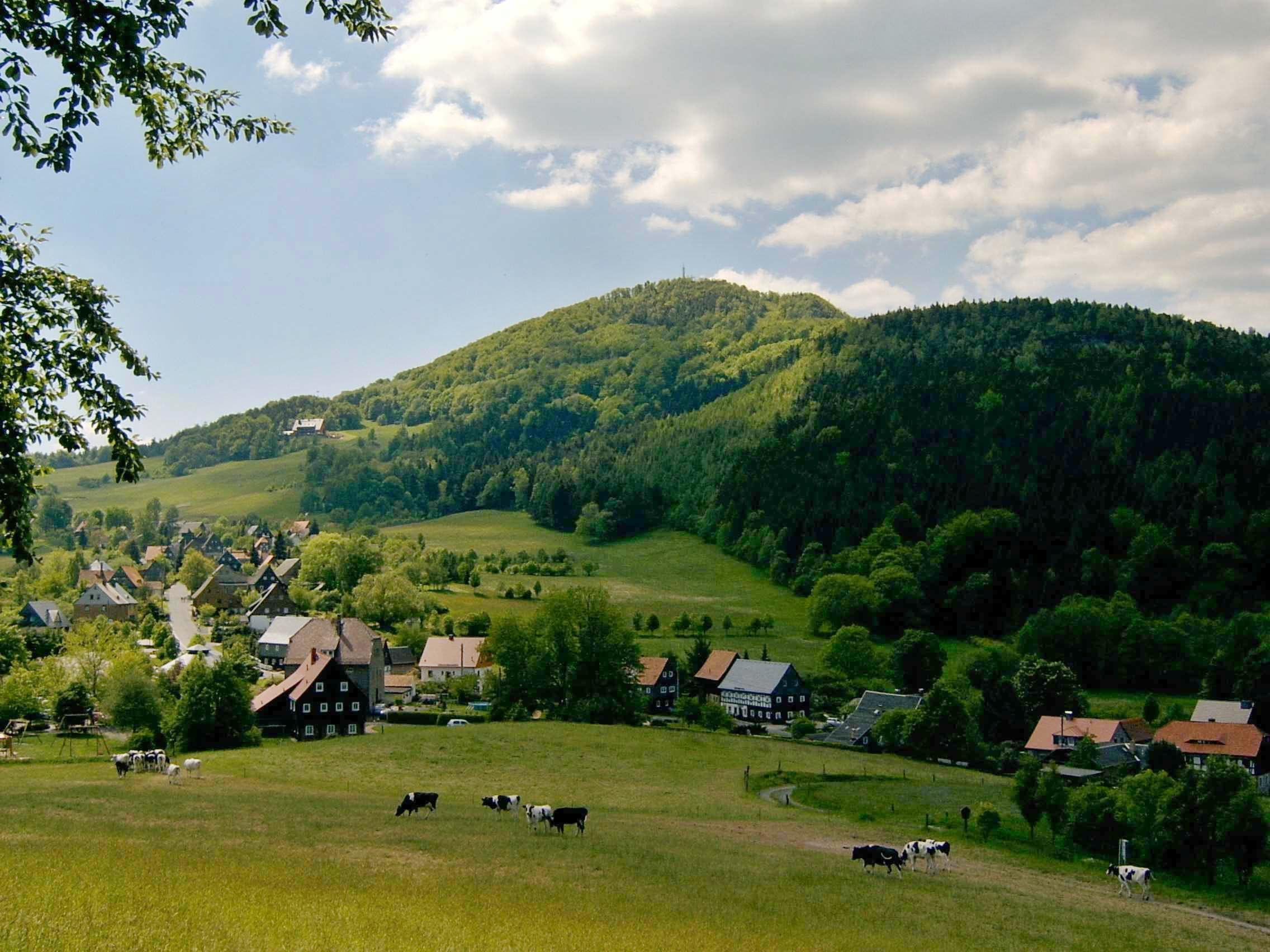
- Lausche crest seen from the north

Highest point
- Elevation: 792.6 m (2,600 ft)
- Prominence: 368 m (1,207 ft)
- Isolation: 25.8 km (16.0 mi)
- Coordinates: 50°50′56″N 14°38′49″E

Geography
- Location within Saxony
- Location: Saxony, Germany / Czech Republic
- Parent range: Lusatian Mountains

Lausche is the highest peak of the Lusatian Mountains. At 792.6 m (2,600 ft), it is also the highest mountain in the German part of the historical region of Upper Lusatia.

The conical mountain lies on the border between the German state of Saxony and the Liberec Region of the Czech Republic. It forms part of the Zittau Mountains, a small mountain range that constitutes the westernmost part of the Lusatian Mountains and belongs to the larger Sudetes mountain system.

== Geography ==
Lausche is located southeast of the town of Zittau and rises prominently above the surrounding landscape near the German–Czech border. The summit ridge forms the international boundary between Saxony and the Czech Republic.

The mountain is surrounded by extensive forests and forms one of the most prominent natural landmarks of the Zittau Mountains Nature Park. Due to its height and exposed position, Lausche offers wide views over the Lusatian Mountains and the surrounding regions of Upper Lusatia and northern Bohemia.

Several marked hiking trails lead to the summit from both the German and Czech sides. The mountain is included in long-distance hiking routes across the Zittau Mountains and is a popular destination for hikers and nature tourists.

== Geology ==
Geologically, Lausche belongs to the volcanic landscape of the Lusatian Mountains. The mountain has a distinctive conical shape that is characteristic of volcanic peaks formed by resistant basaltic rock. Volcanic activity during the Tertiary period created many of the prominent hills and mountains of the region.

These volcanic formations contrast with the surrounding sandstone and crystalline rock landscapes found in nearby mountain ranges such as the Elbe Sandstone Mountains.

== History ==
Lausche has long been a well-known landmark in the border region between Saxony and Bohemia. In the 19th and early 20th centuries, the mountain became an important destination for tourism in the Zittau Mountains.

A mountain inn and observation tower were once located near the summit. These facilities were destroyed by fire in the late 20th century, and the summit area has since remained largely undeveloped. Nevertheless, Lausche continues to attract visitors due to its natural scenery and panoramic views.

== Tourism ==
Today Lausche is one of the most popular hiking destinations in the Zittau Mountains. Trails from the German village of Waltersdorf and from Czech settlements such as Dolní Světlá lead to the summit area.

The mountain is frequently visited as part of hiking routes through the Lusatian Mountains and the Zittau Mountains Nature Park. In winter the surrounding slopes are occasionally used for cross-country skiing and other winter activities.

== Nature ==
The forests around Lausche are dominated by spruce and mixed mountain forest typical of the higher elevations of the Lusatian Mountains. The mountain lies within protected natural landscapes on both the German and Czech sides of the border, forming part of an important ecological corridor between Saxony and northern Bohemia.
