= Georg Schwanhardt =

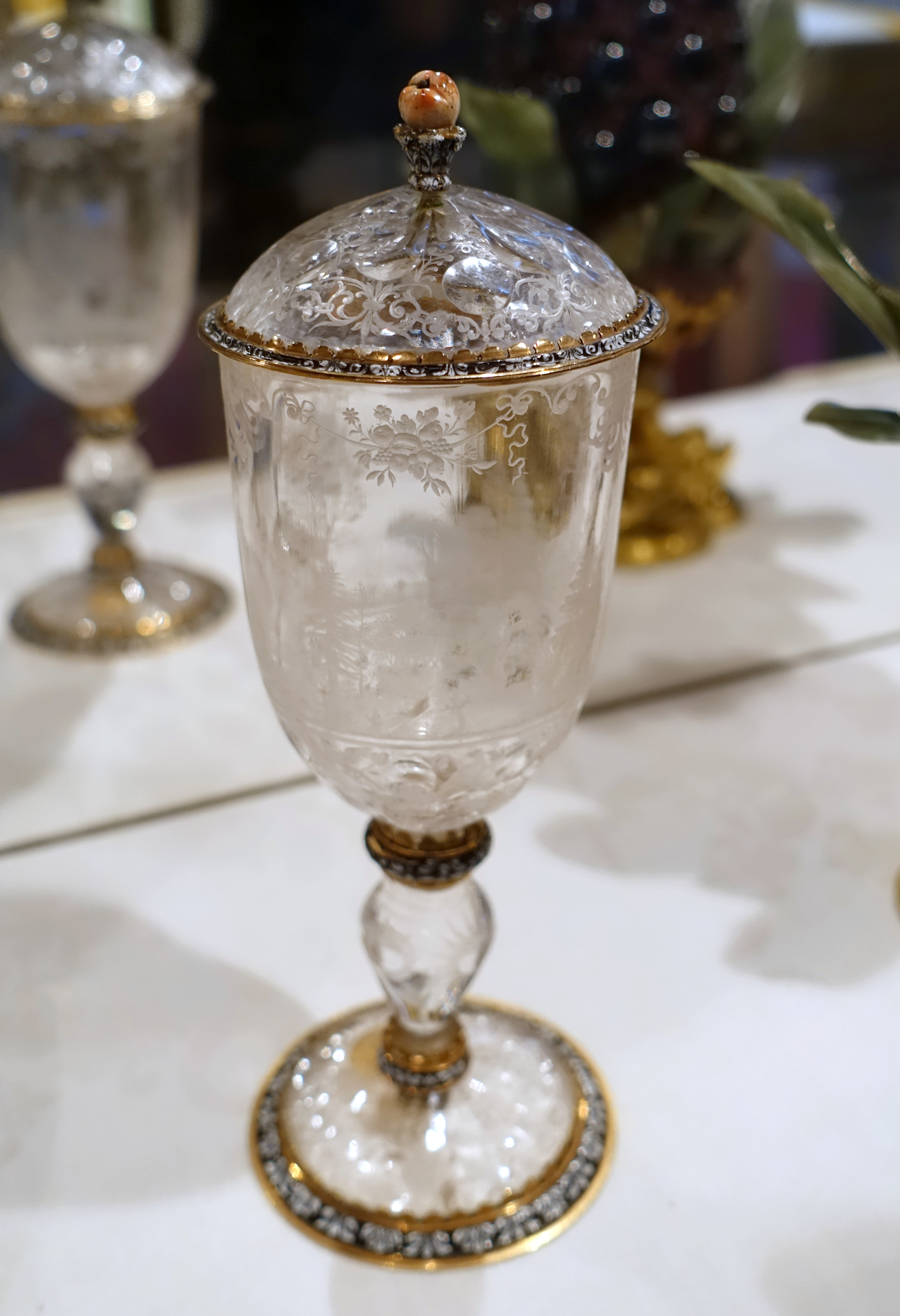
Goblet by Georg Schwanhardt the elder, Nuremberg, 1651, with later additions

Georg Schwanhardt the Elder (1601-1667) was a German glass-engraver and rock crystal engraver, and the founder of the Nuremberg school of engravers. He was a student of Caspar Lehmann and upon Lehmann's death inherited his exclusive patent for engraving glass. His engravings often portray miniature landscapes adorned with formal scrollwork.
