= Hochwald (Zittau Mountains) =

Mountain in Germany

Hochwald / Hvozd
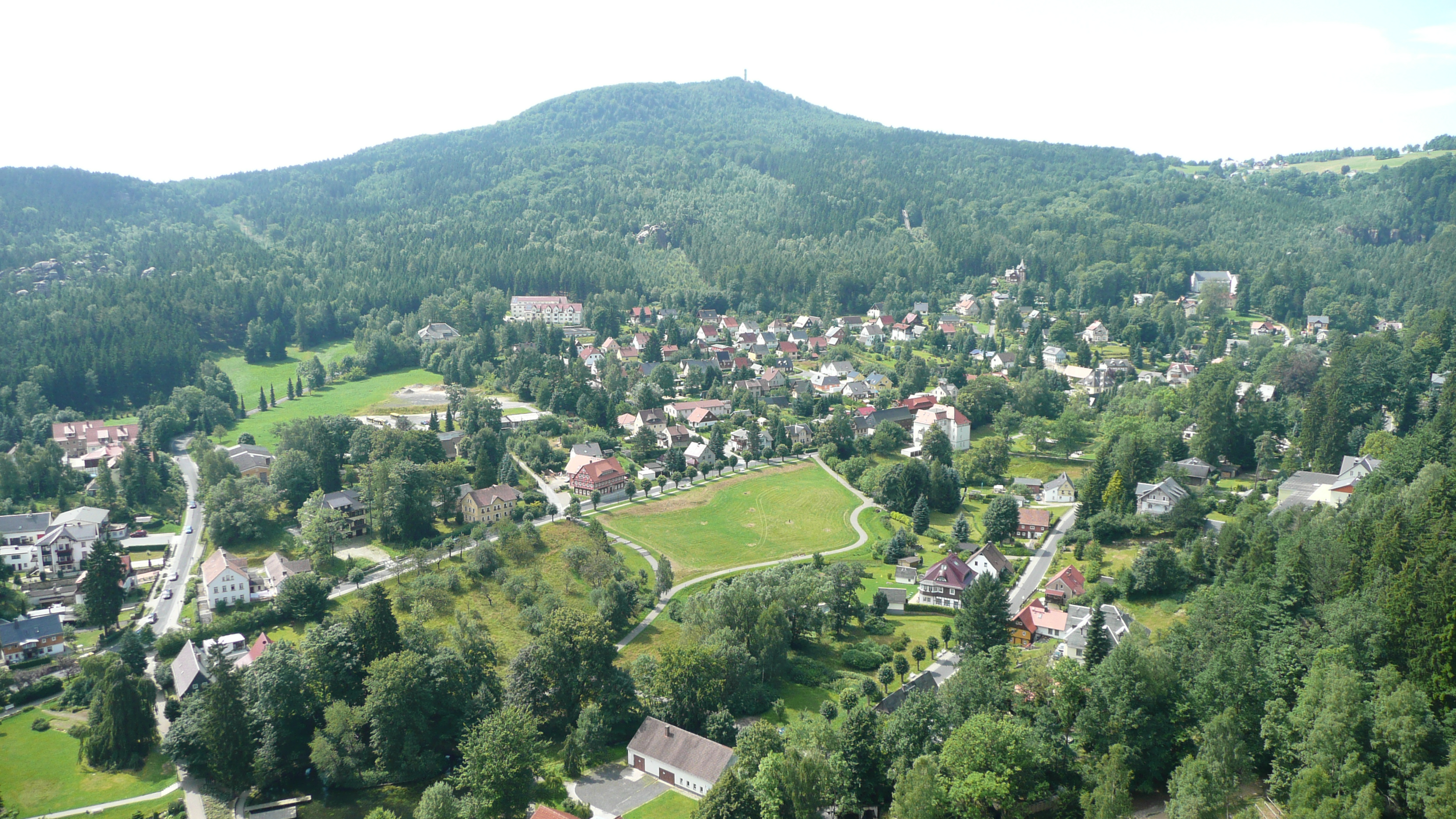

Highest point
- Elevation: 749.5 m (2,459 ft)
- Prominence: 235 m (771 ft)
- Isolation: 6.2 km (3.9 mi)
- Coordinates: 50°49′21″N 14°43′34″E

Geography
- Location within Saxony
- Countries: Germany, Czech Republic
- State/ Region: Saxony/ Liberec
- Parent range: Lusatian Mountains

Hochwald (Czech: Hvozd; Upper Sorbian: Hvězda) is a mountain on the border of Germany and the Czech Republic. It is at 749.5 metres (2,459 ft) above sea level, one of the highest in the Lusatian/Zittau ranges. It has two peaks, the southern main summit (through which the state border extends), which lies 743.8 metres (2,440 ft) above sea level, and the north summit, which is 370 metres (1,210 ft) away. Due to the visually appealing views from the mountain, it has earned the nickname Aussichtsturm des Zittauer Gebirges (lit. 'lookout tower of the Zittau Mountains').

== Summits ==
=== Southern ===
In 1853, a cottage was built on the Czech side of the mountain; it burned completely down in 1877. The next year, another was erected in the half-timber style. A year after that, a 10-metre (33 ft) wooden lookout tower, Carola, was built; it would be destroyed in 1891. Because of the numerous visitors, the German side of the mountain saw a restaurant created that still stands today, while the second cottage on the Czech side was demolished in 1951.

=== Northern ===
A 25-metre (82 ft) stone tower was built due to the initial wooden tower being in a state of disrepair, dedicated on September 14, 1892. A short time later, a ticket sales house was created. It was ultimately turned into a restaurant, in where New Year's Day festivities are held today.

=== View ===
From the upper terrace of the mountain, there is an undisturbed field of view east, south, and west. A plethora of other mountains can be seen.
