= Lithyalin glass =

Opaque decorative glass

Lithyalin glass is a type of opaque decorative glass developed in early 19th-century Bohemia. It was invented by the glassmaker Friedrich Egermann, who patented the process in 1828.

Lithyalin glass was designed to imitate semiprecious stones such as agate and jasper through its marbled appearance. It is characterized by its opaque body and mottled coloration produced during manufacture.

The material was part of a broader development in 19th-century Bohemian glass aimed at replicating semiprecious stones. Objects made from lithyalin glass include vases, beakers, and decorative containers.
