= Zittau Mountains Nature Park =

Nature park in Saxony, Germany

- Naturpark Zittauer Gebirge
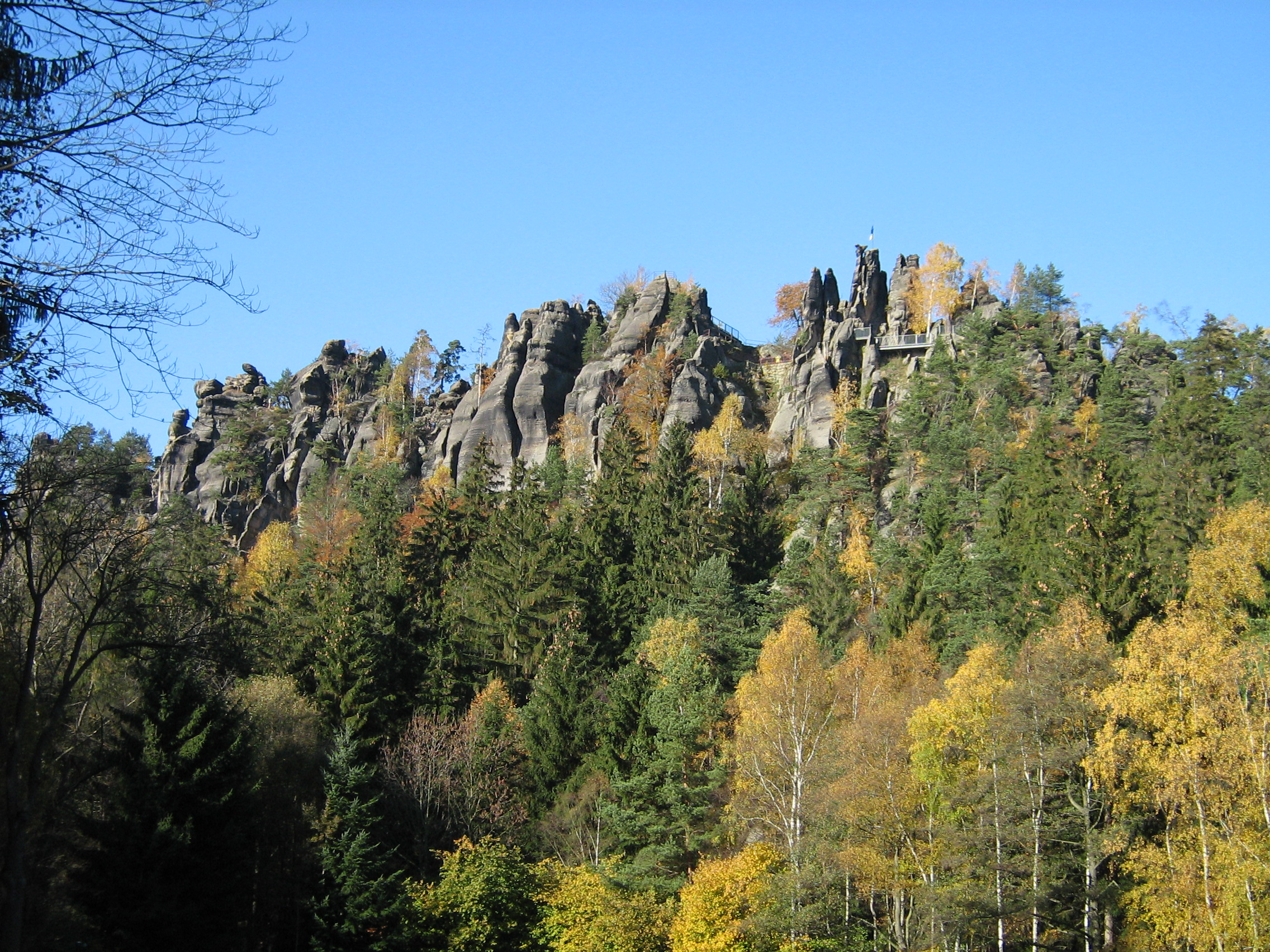
- Zittau Mountains Nature Park covers the German parts of the Lusatian Mountains Logo for Zittau Mountains Nature Park

- Location within Germany
- Location: Saxony, Germany
- Coordinates: 50°53′10″N 14°42′10″E
- Area: 133 km^{2} (51 sq mi)
- Established: 2008
- Governing body: German Federal Environment Ministry

The Zittau Mountains Nature Park (German: Naturpark Zittauer Gebirge; Upper Sorbian: Přirodny park Žitawske horiny) is a nature park in Germany, created in 2008.

The nature park comprise the German parts of the Lusatian Mountains at the borders with the Czech Republic and Poland and covers an area of 113 square kilometres (44 sq mi) of forests, lakes, meadows and peatlands. Most of the Lusatian Mountains are in the Czech Republic, and these parts forms the Lusatian Mountains Protected Landscape Area (CHKO Lužické hory).

== Protected areas ==
Zittau Mountains Nature Park consists of three protection zones:

- Protection zone I (117 acres) includes the areas with the most valuable natural features and smaller nature parks, the Lausche and Jonsdorfer Felsenstadt.
- Protection zone II (7611 acres) includes the landscape parks of Zittauer Gebirge and Mandautal.
- Protection zone III (4610 acres) includes the settlement areas.

== Fauna and flora ==
There are many protected species in the park, like arnica montana, aster alpinus, drosera rotundifolia, pedicularis palustris and many orchids. The alpine shrew and many species of owl also live there.

== Gallery ==
Landscapes

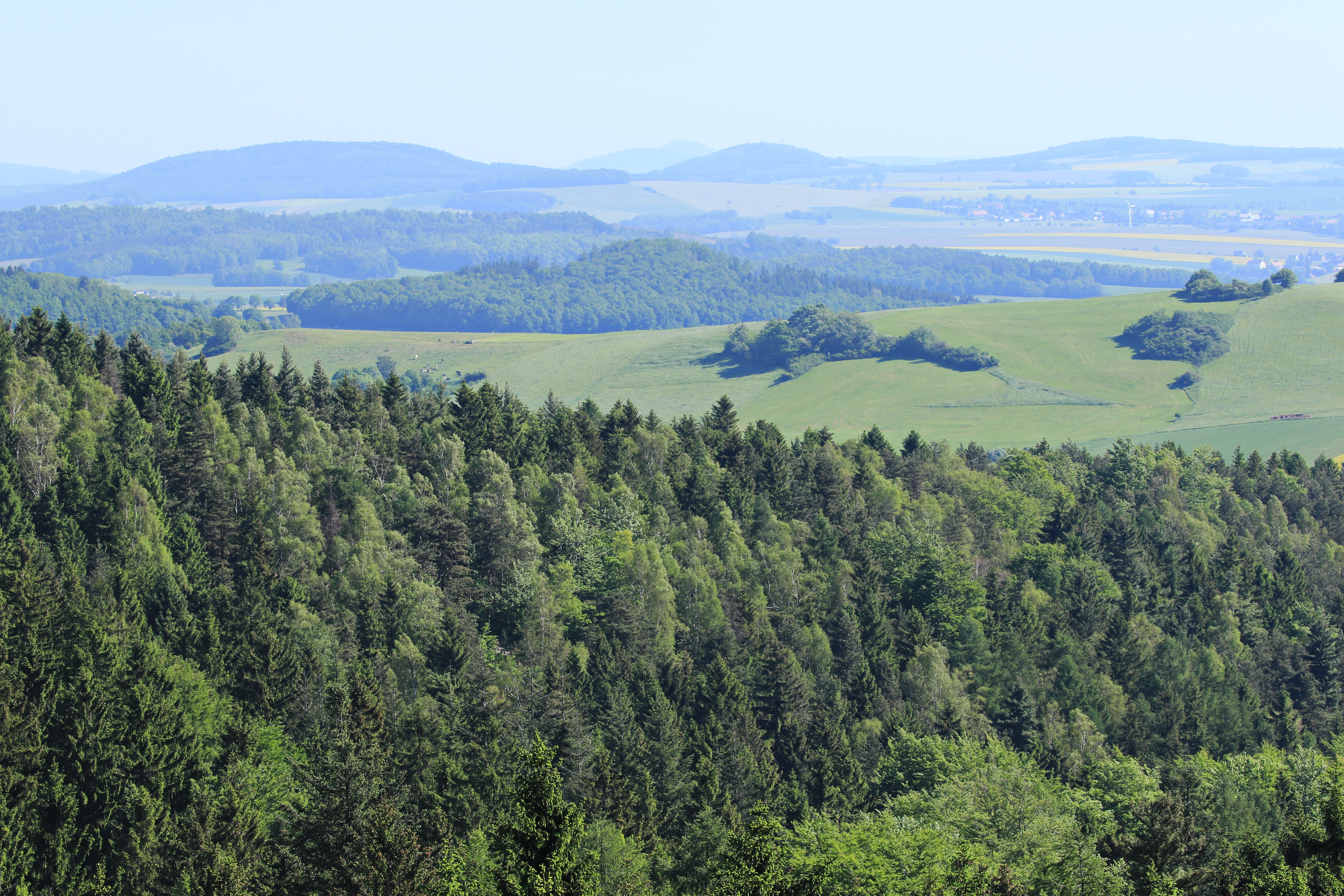

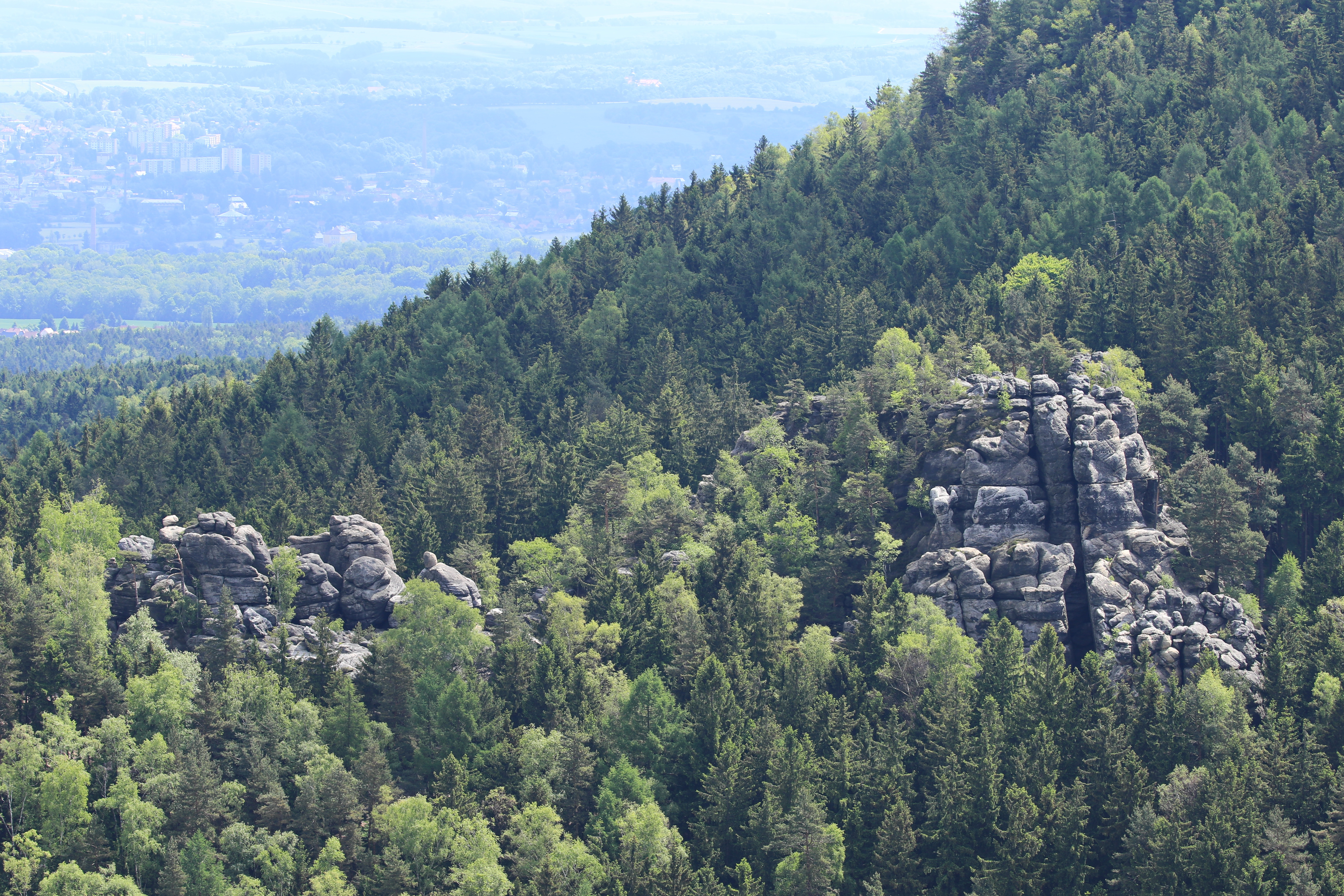

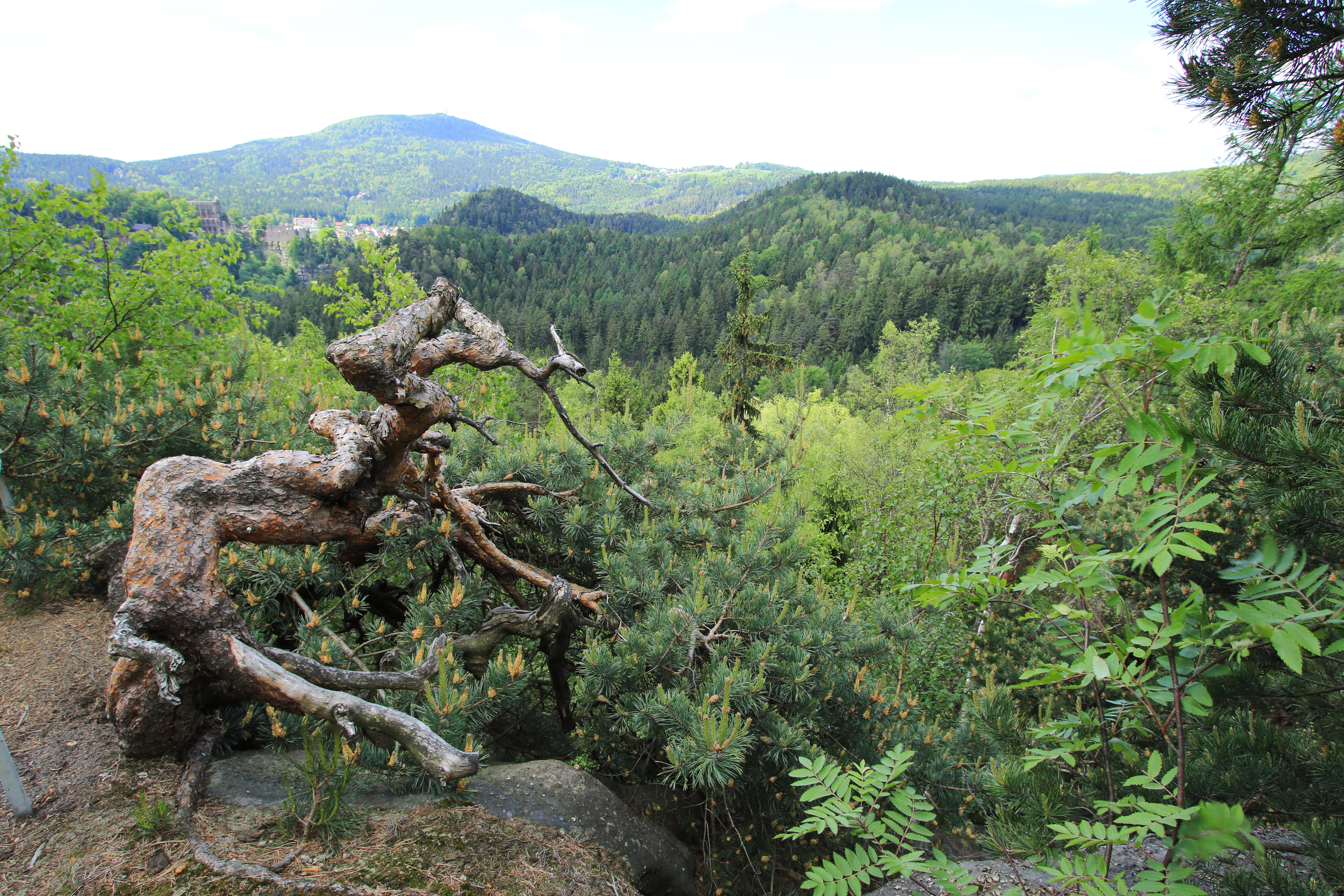

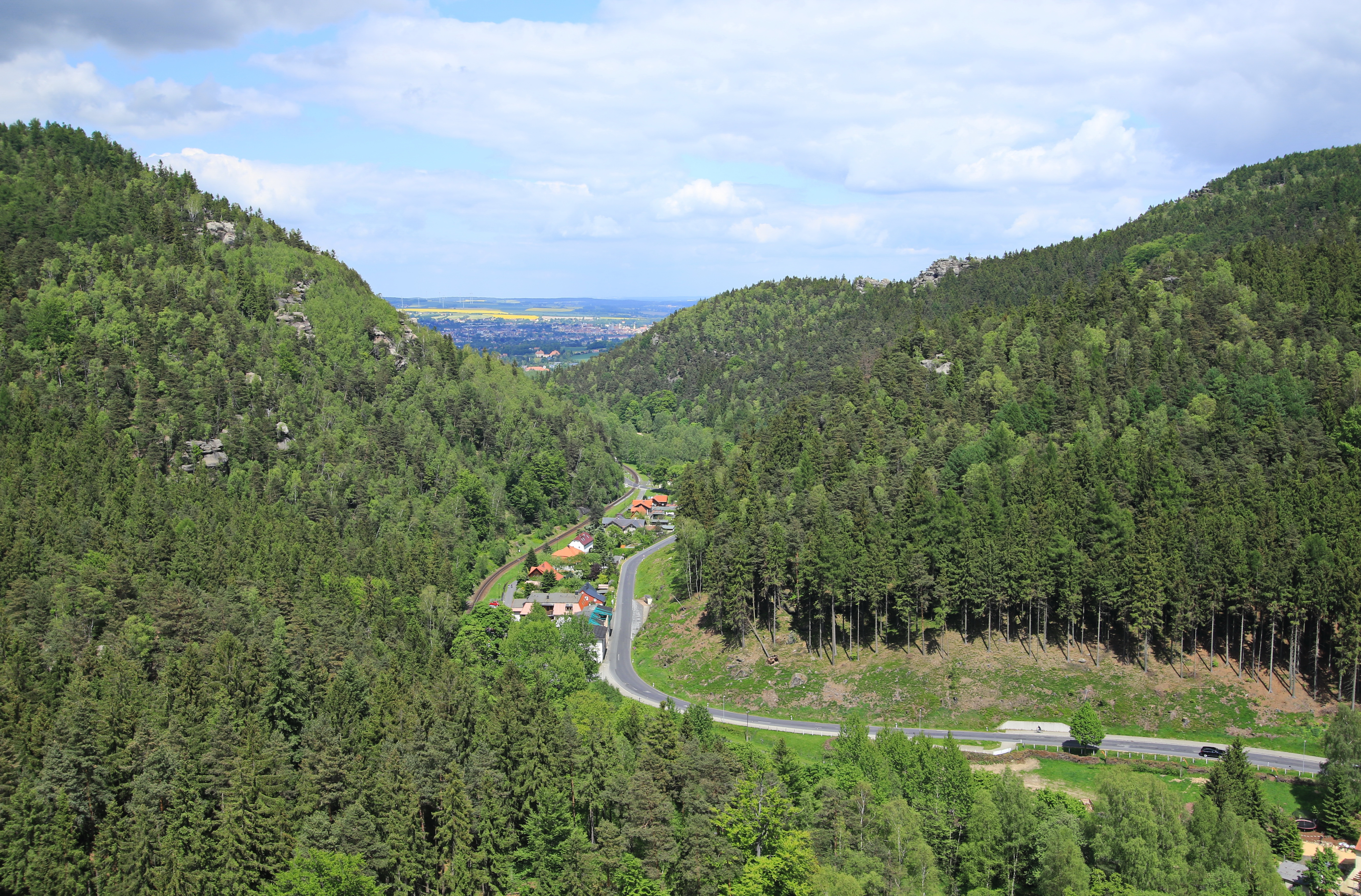

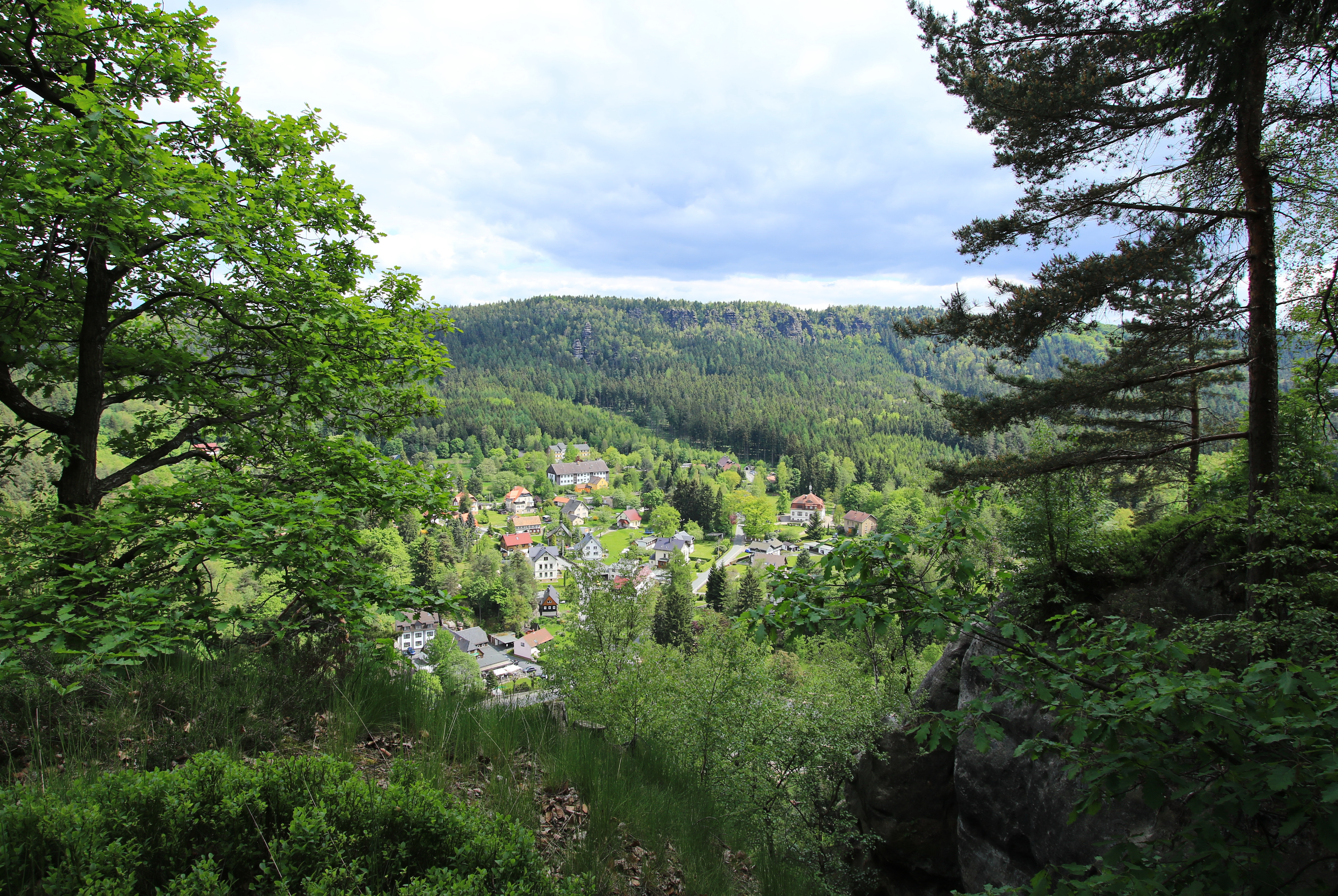

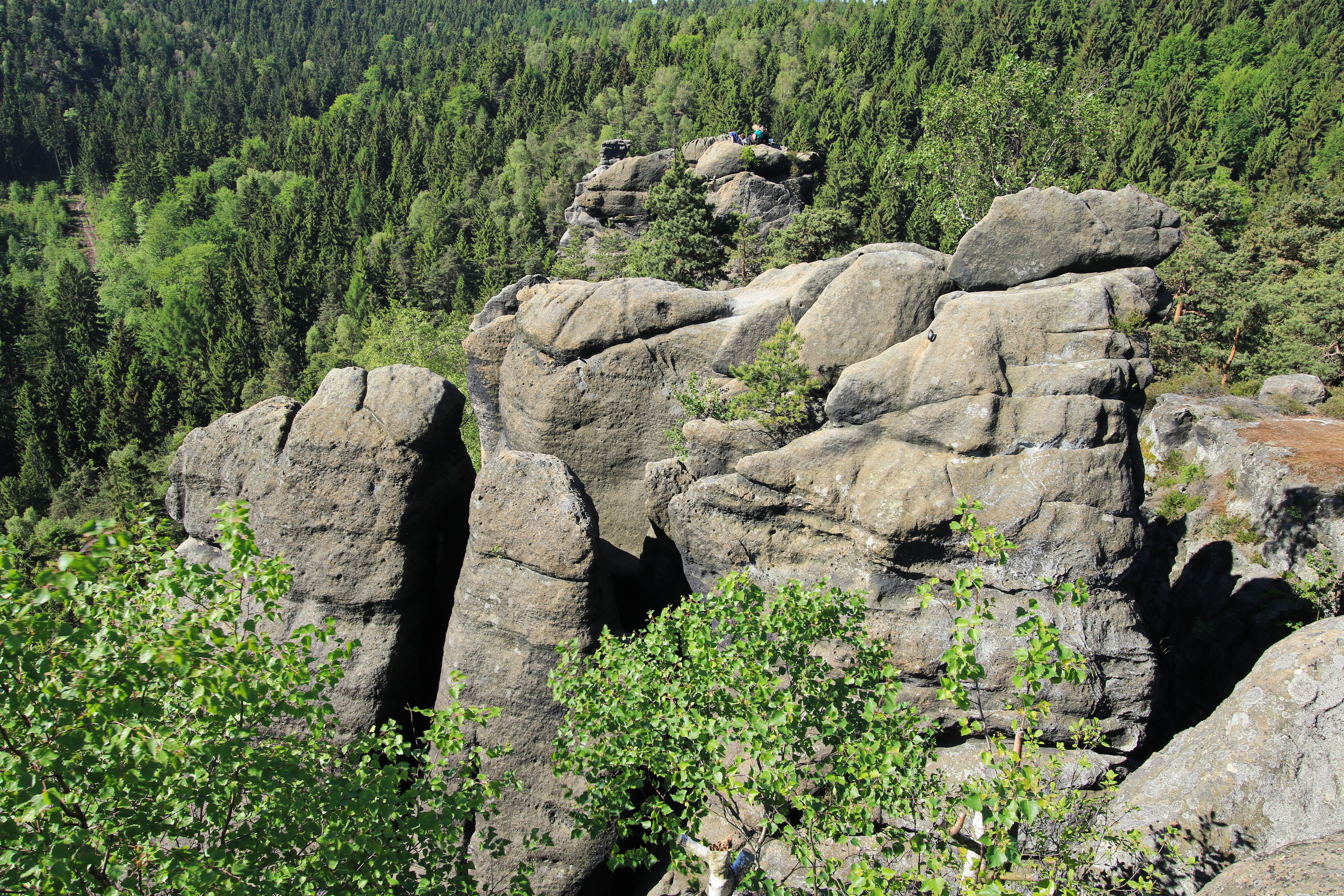

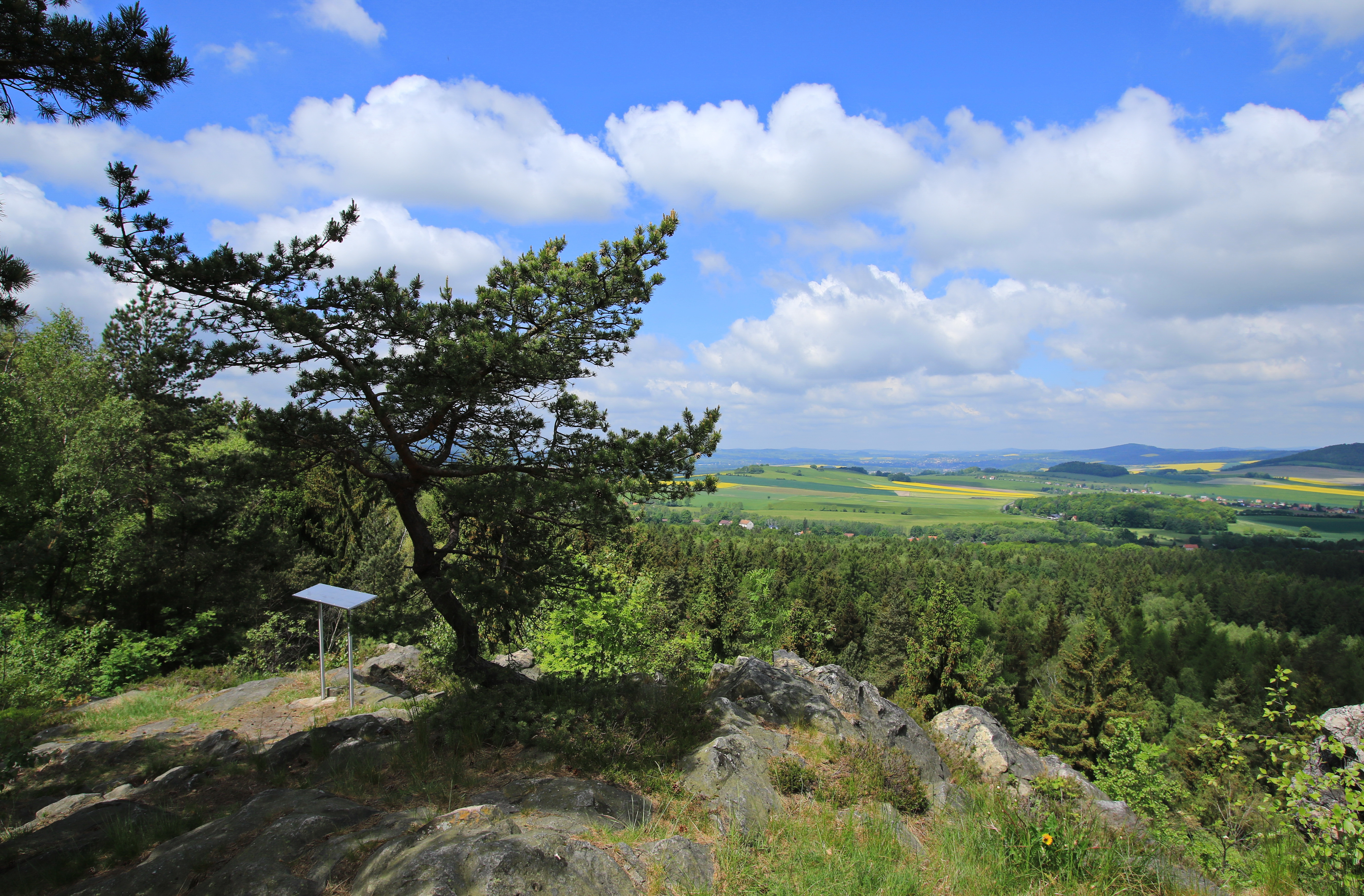

Scenes

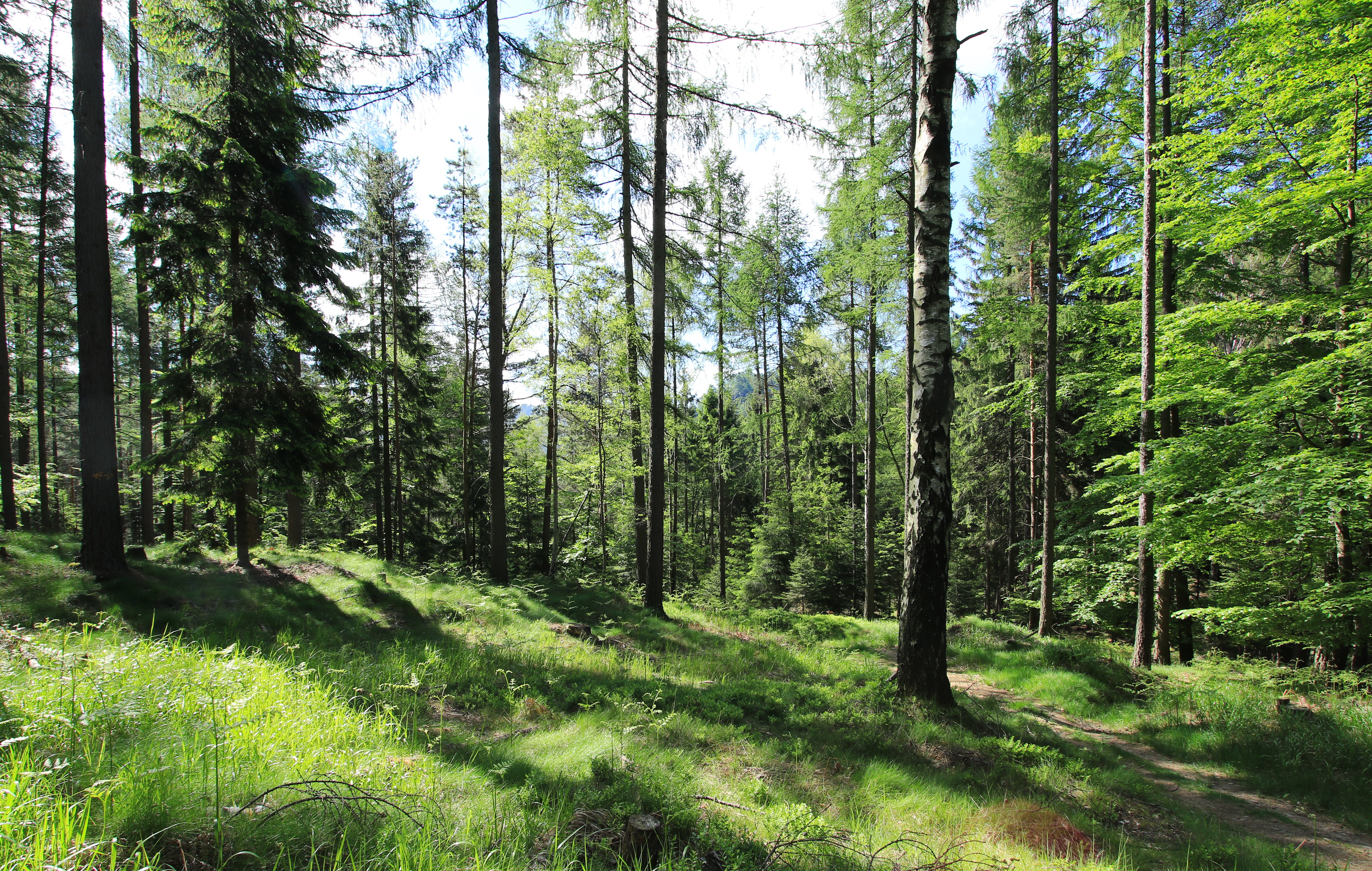
Mixed forests

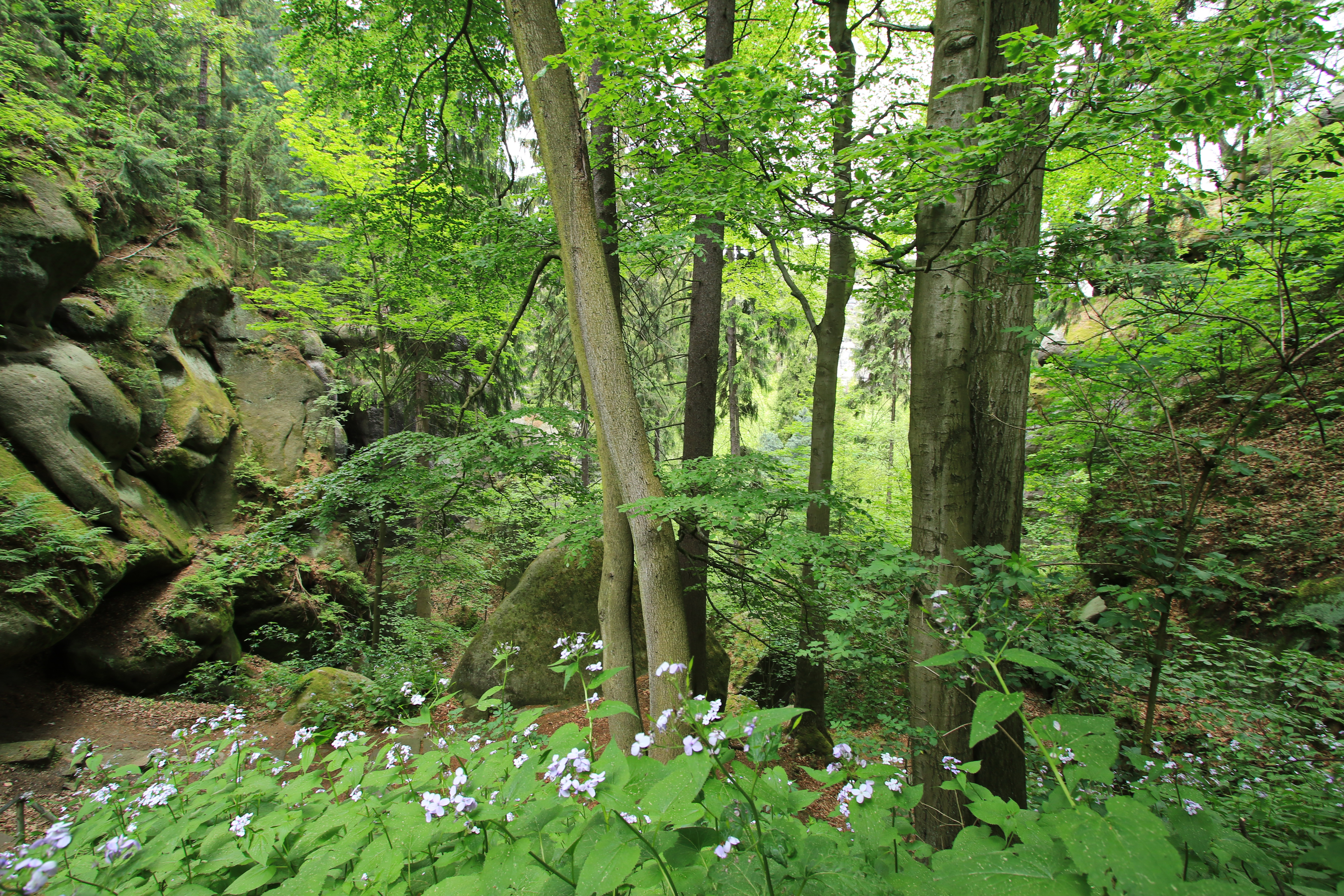
Deciduous woods

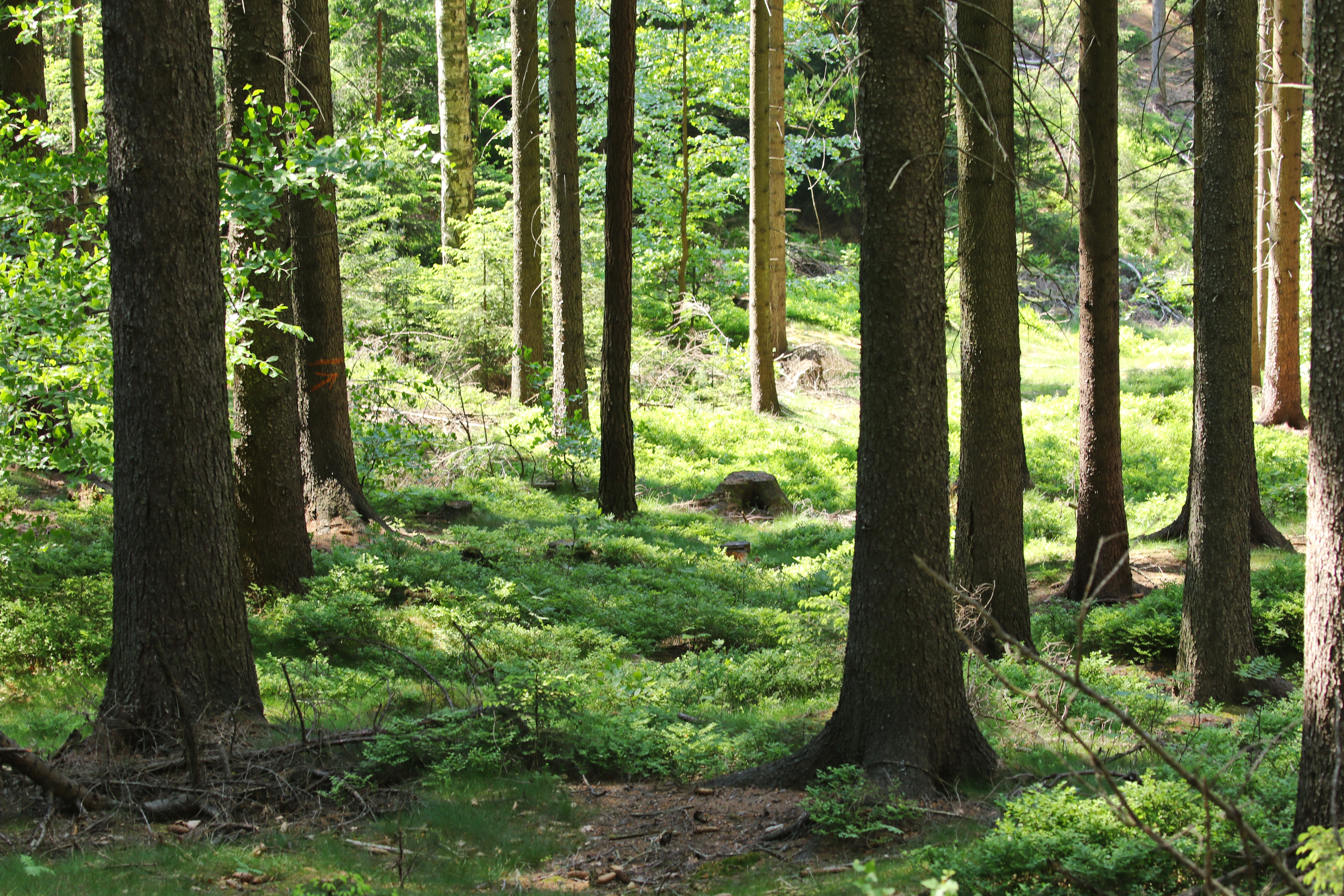
Conifer woods

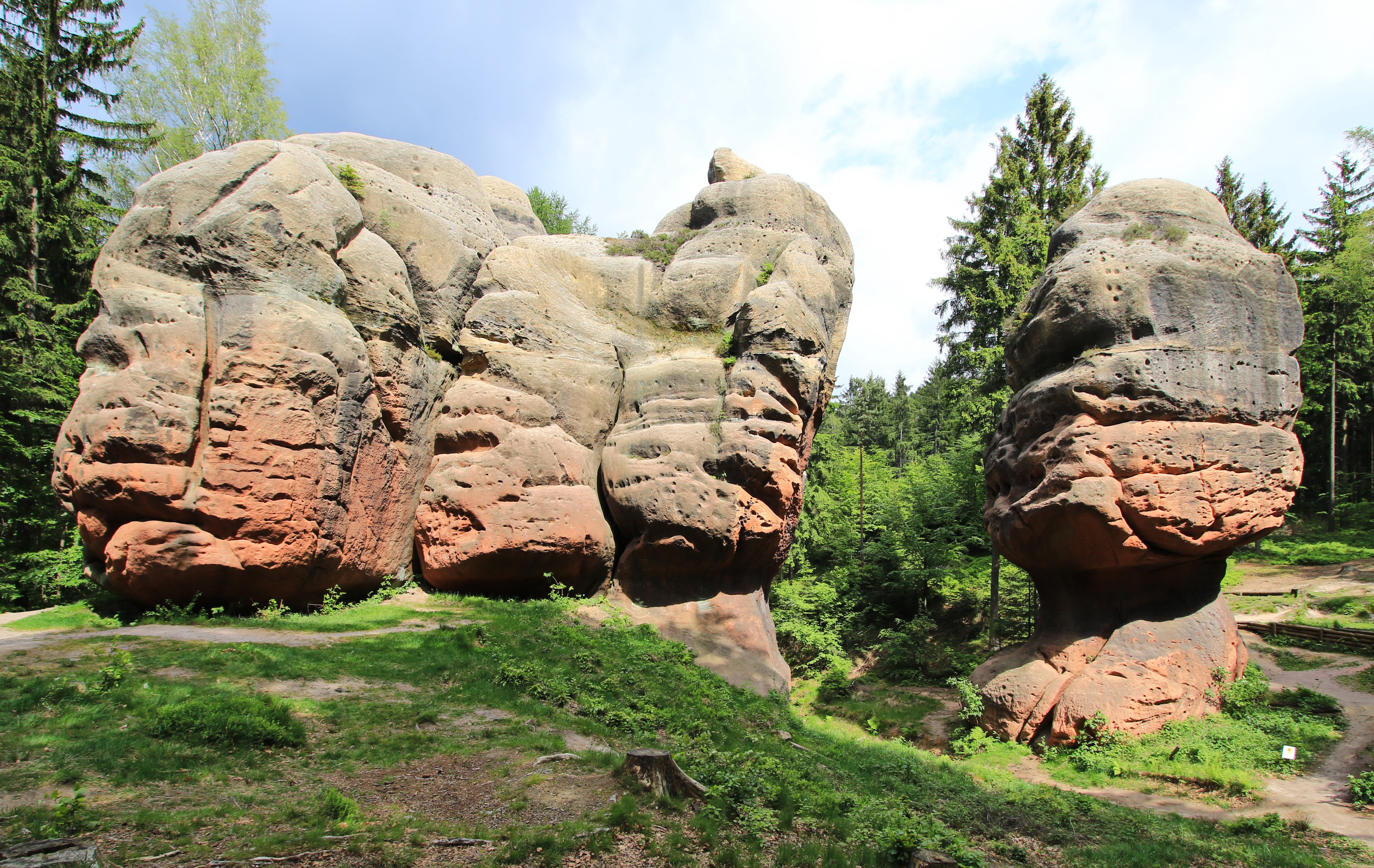
Natural monuments (Kelchsteine)

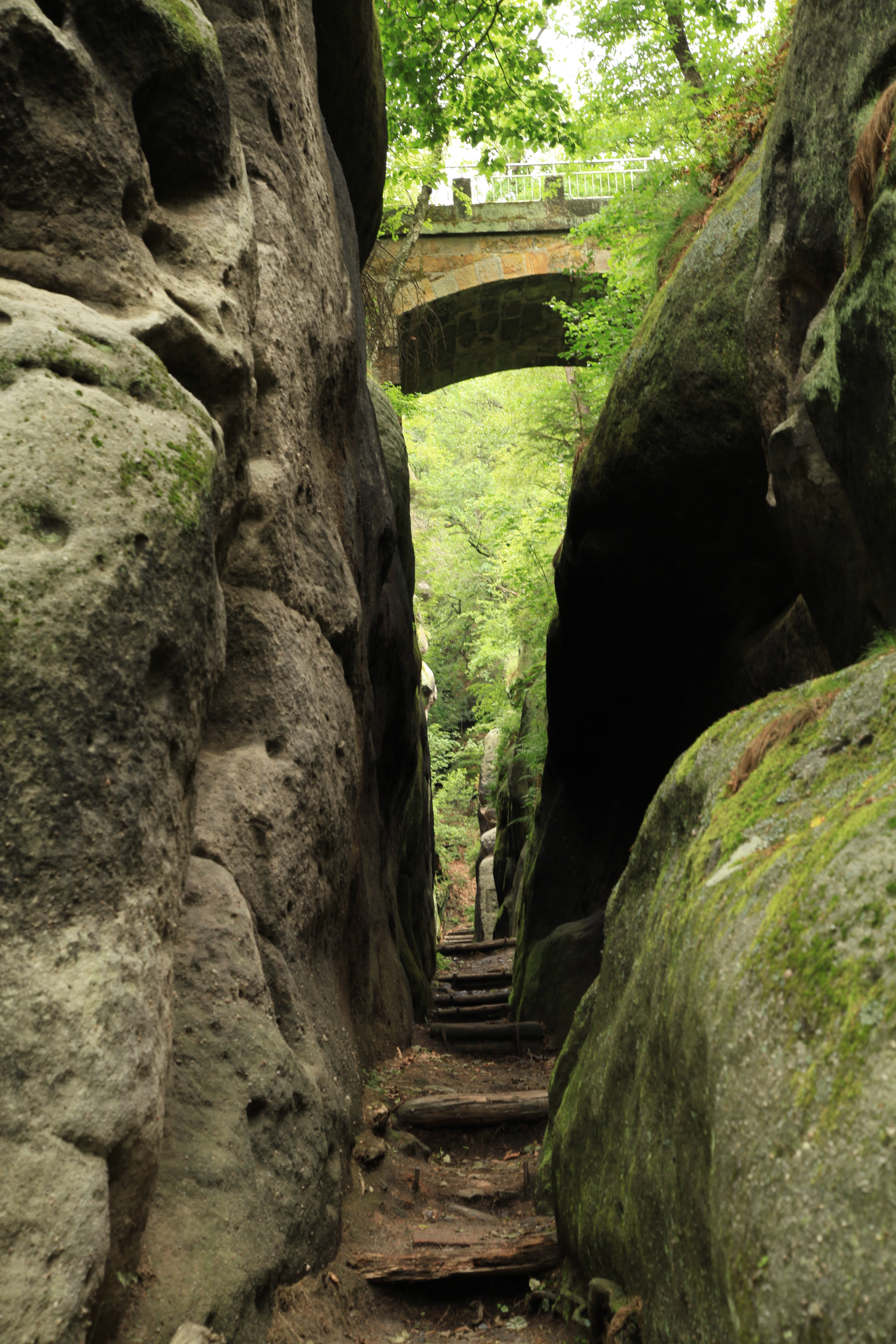
Gorges and small canyons (Ritterschlucht)

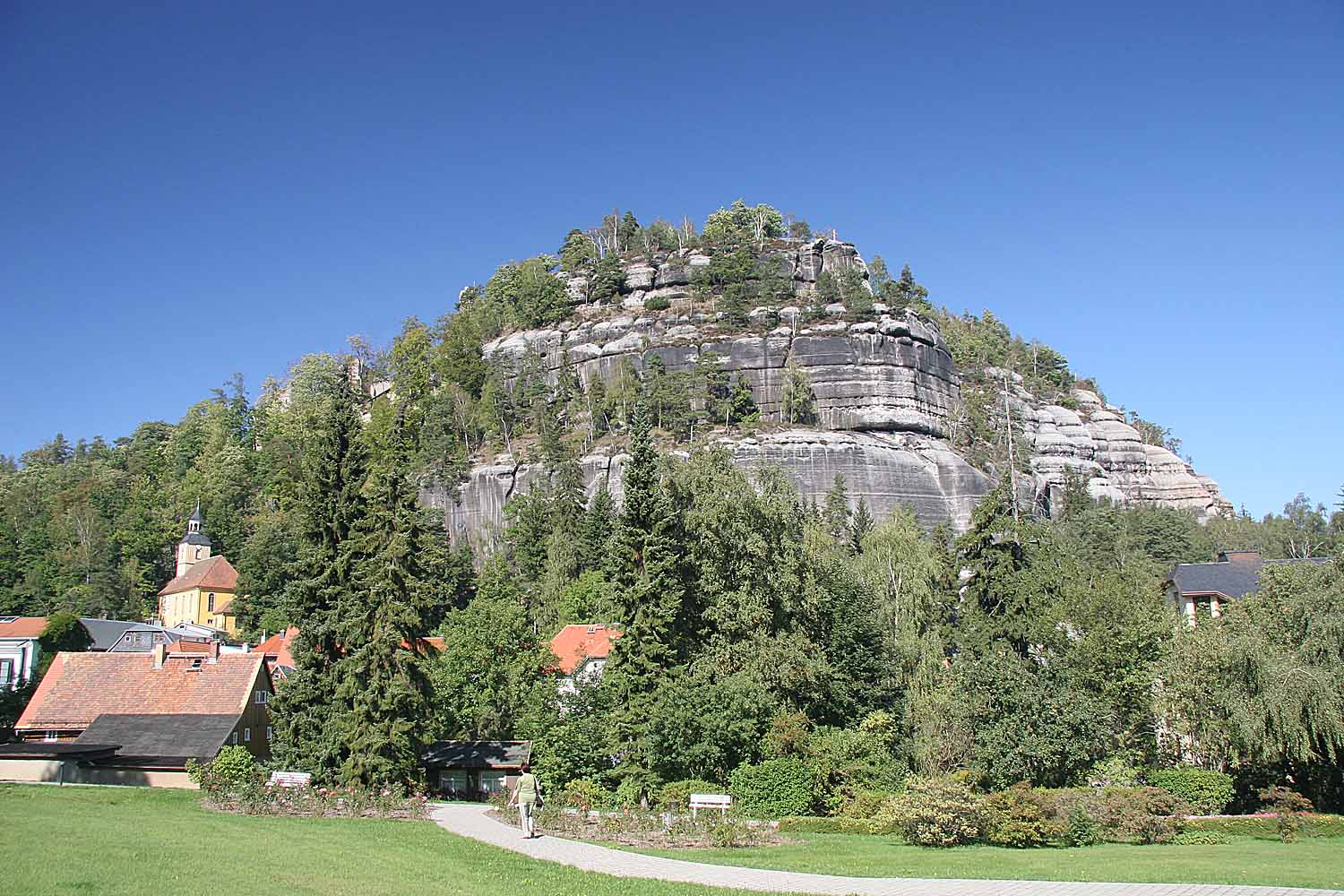
Berg Oybin

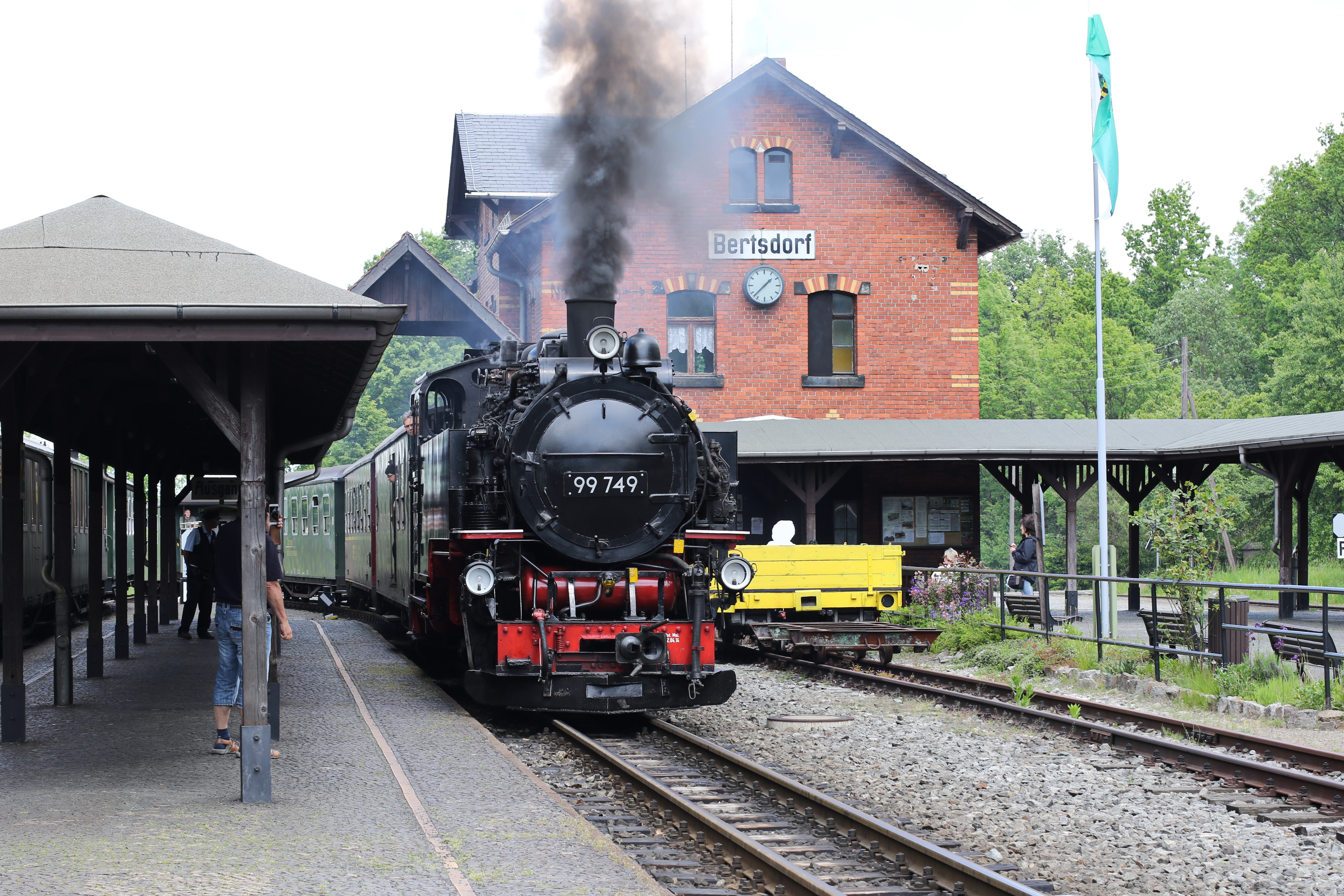
Old locomotive at the Bertsdorf train station

== See also ==
- List of nature parks in Germany
