= Caspar Lehmann =

Caspar Lehmann (fl. early 17th century) was a German gem cutter and glass engraver.

In the first decade of the 17th century, Lehmann adapted the techniques of using copper and bronze wheels to engrave gems to engrave glass. Though both intaglio (Tiefschnitt, “deep cut”) and high relief (Hochschnitt, “high cut”) engraving on glass had been practiced since ancient times, Lehmann was the earliest modern glass engraver to develop an advanced technique and a personal style. His earliest dated work is a glass beaker, dated 1605. In 1609, he received an exclusive privilege from Emperor Rudolf II in Prague for engraving glass.

His pupil Georg Schwanhardt went on to found the Nürnberg school of engravers.

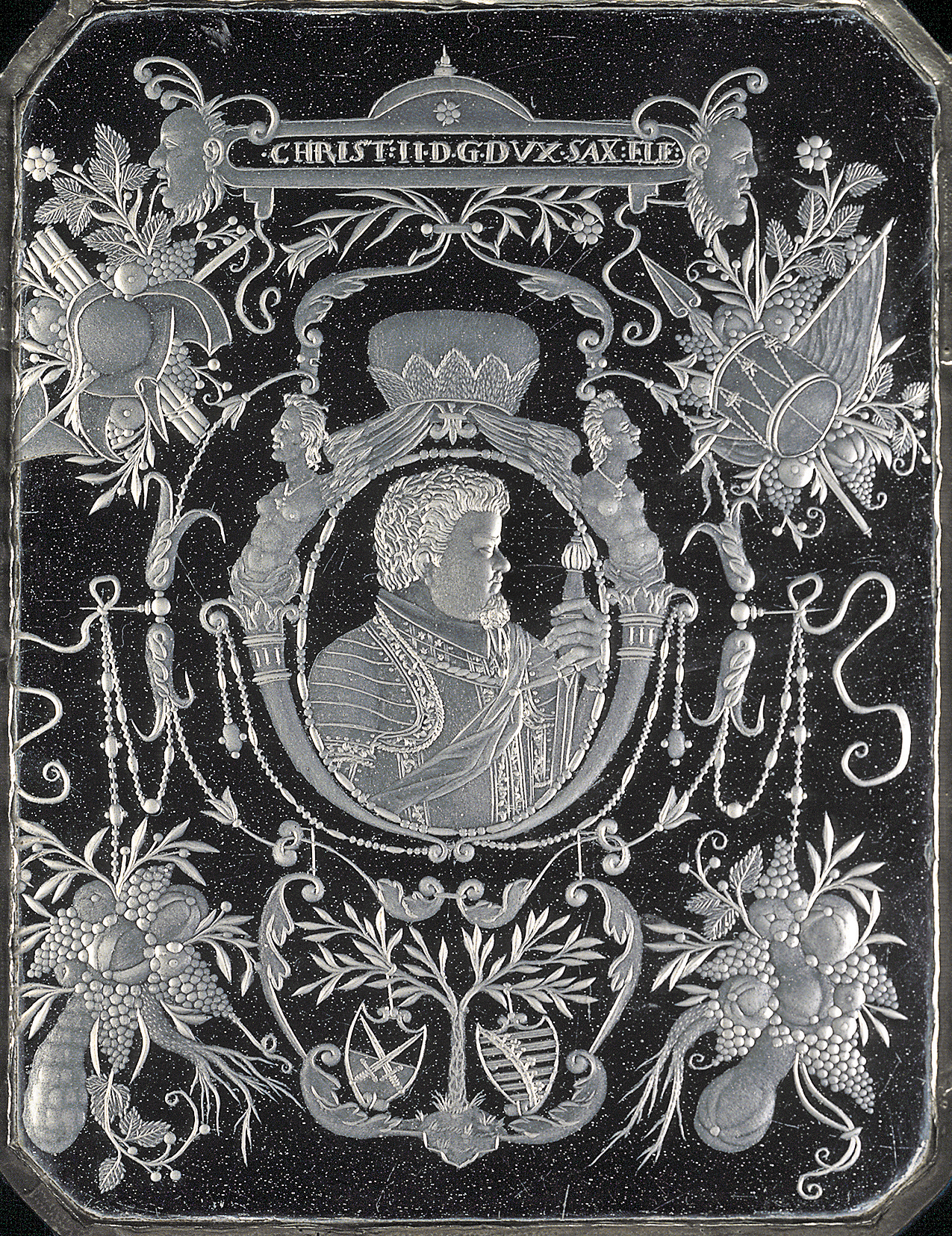
Caspar Lehmann, plaque with a portrait of Christian II, Elector of Saxony, 1602 or 1606, Museum of Decorative Arts in Prague

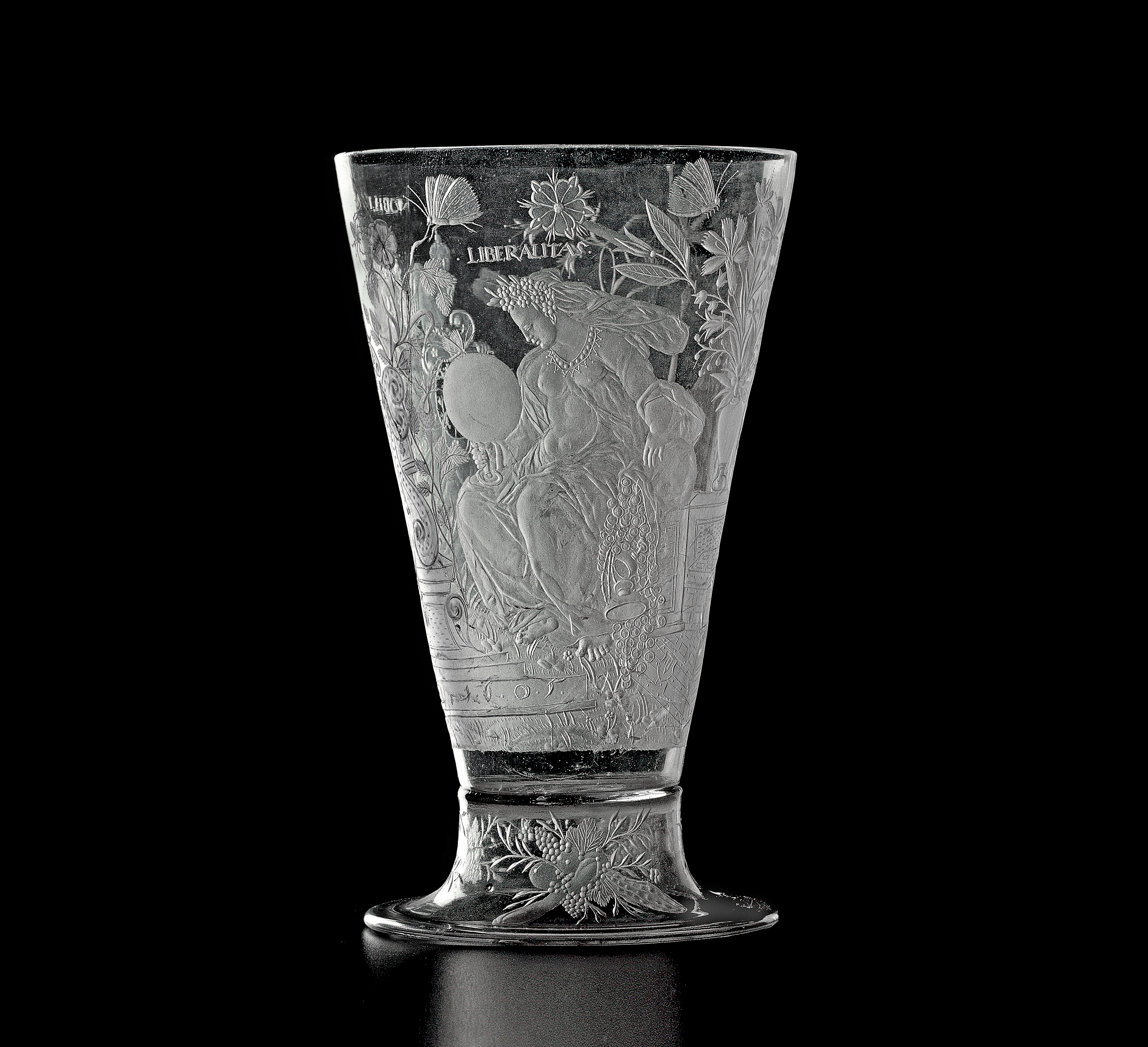
Caspar Lehmann, Beaker with the coats of arms of Wolf Sigismund von Losenstein and Susana von Rogendorf, and three allegorical figures, dated 1605, Museum of Decorative Arts in Prague

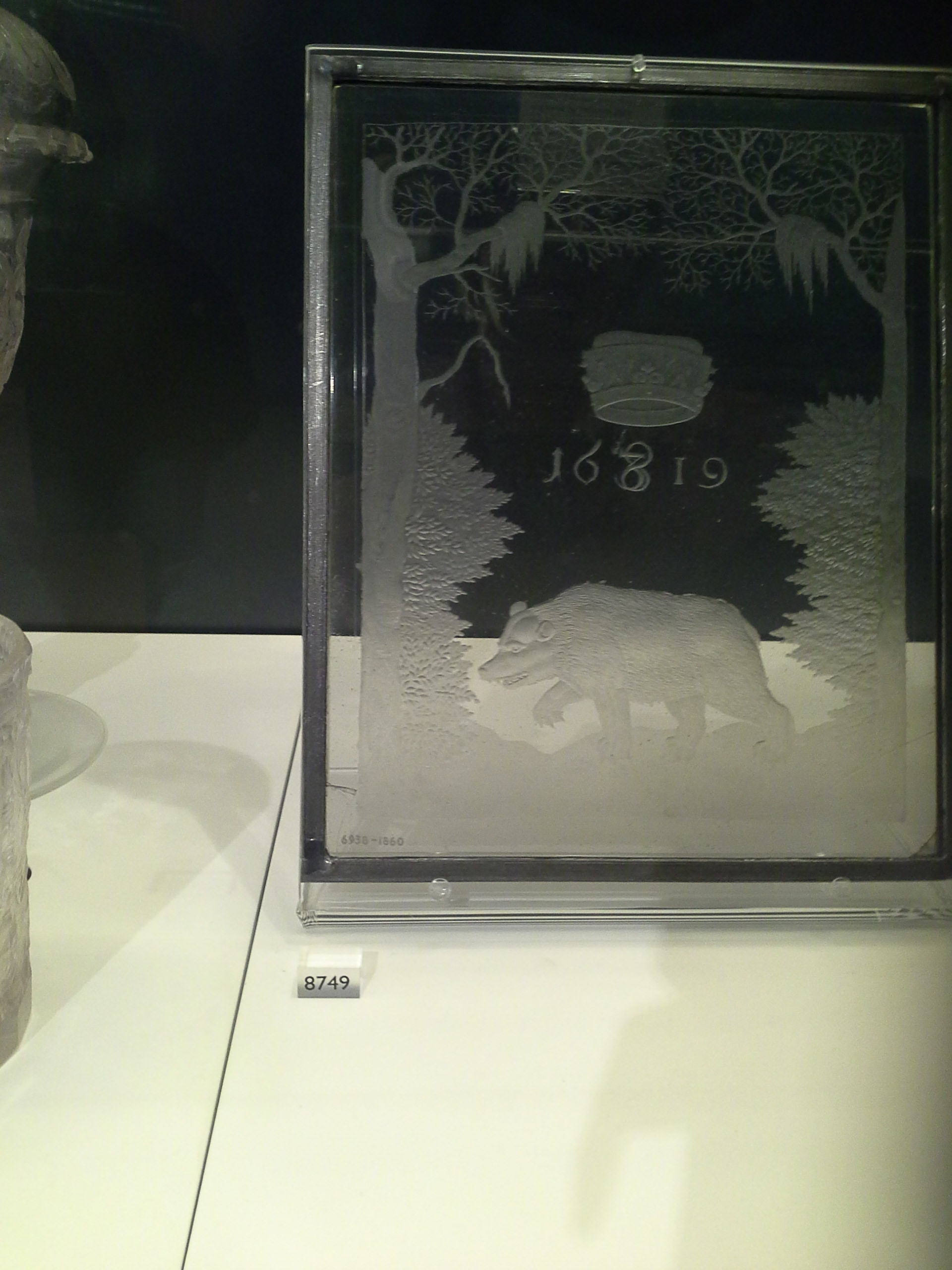
Glass made by Caspar Lehmann

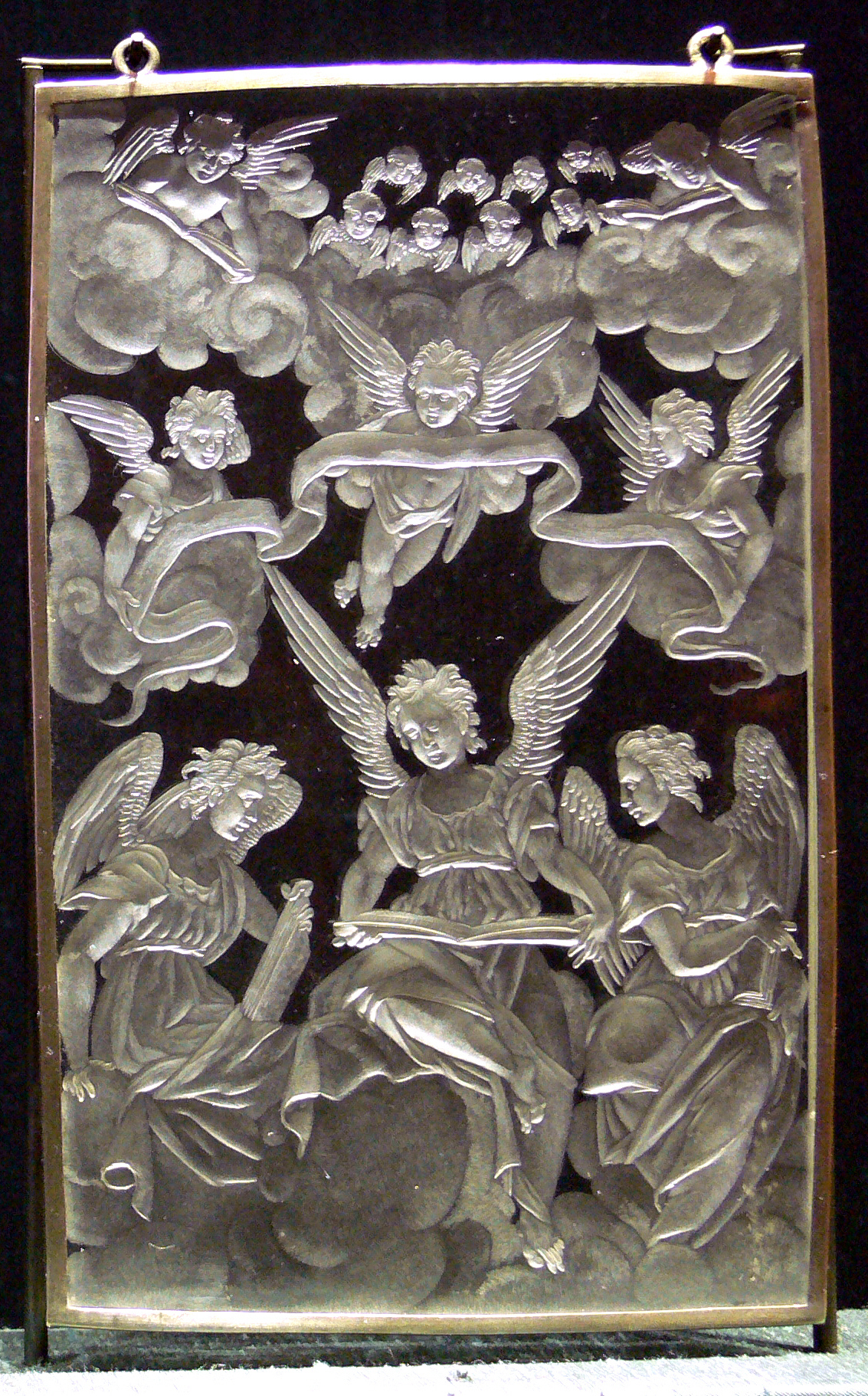
Engraved rock crystal plaque

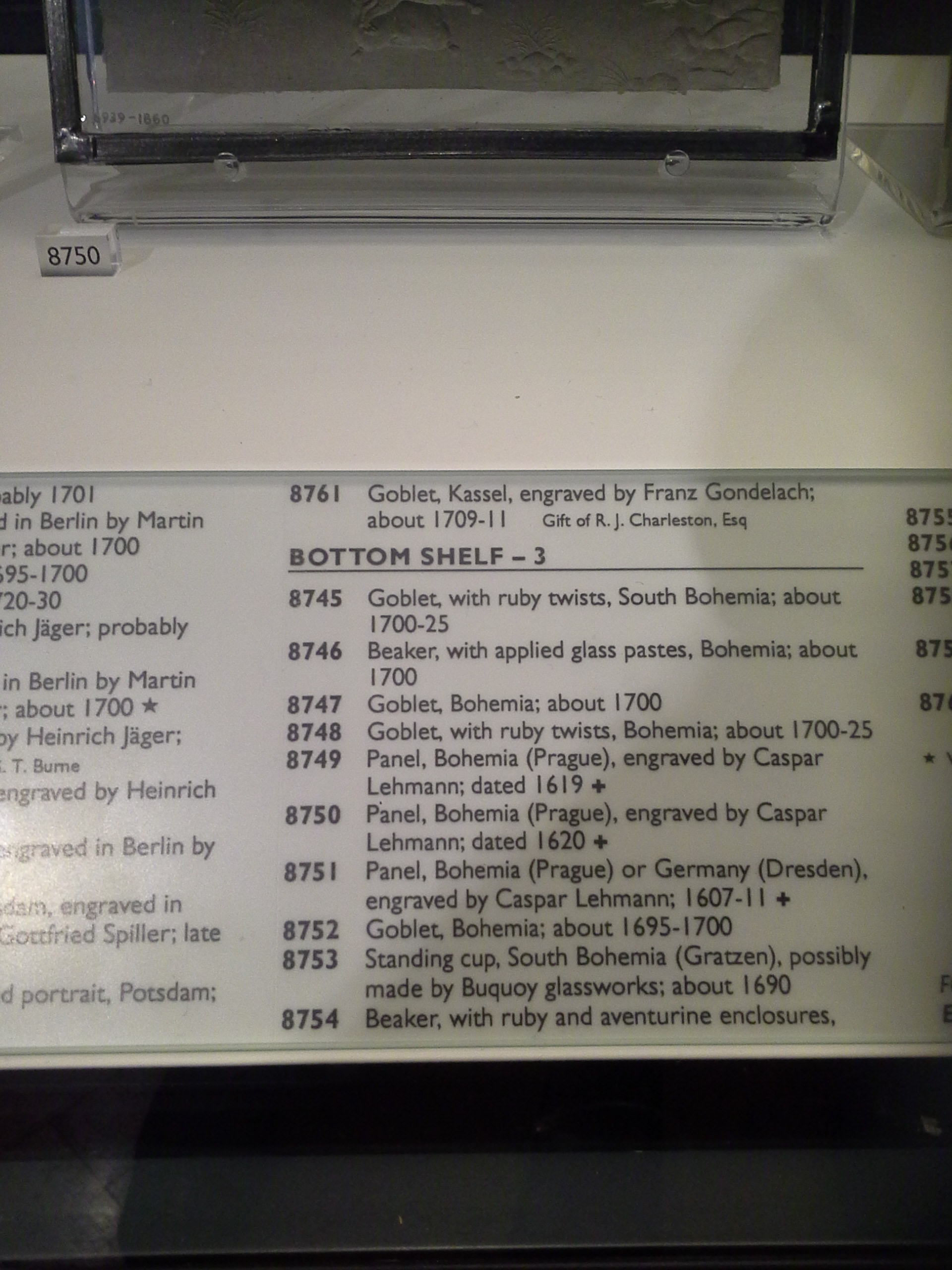
Documented glass in V&A museum
