= Nižbor glassworks =

Czech glass factory

Coordinates: 50.00312587°N 14.00220394°E

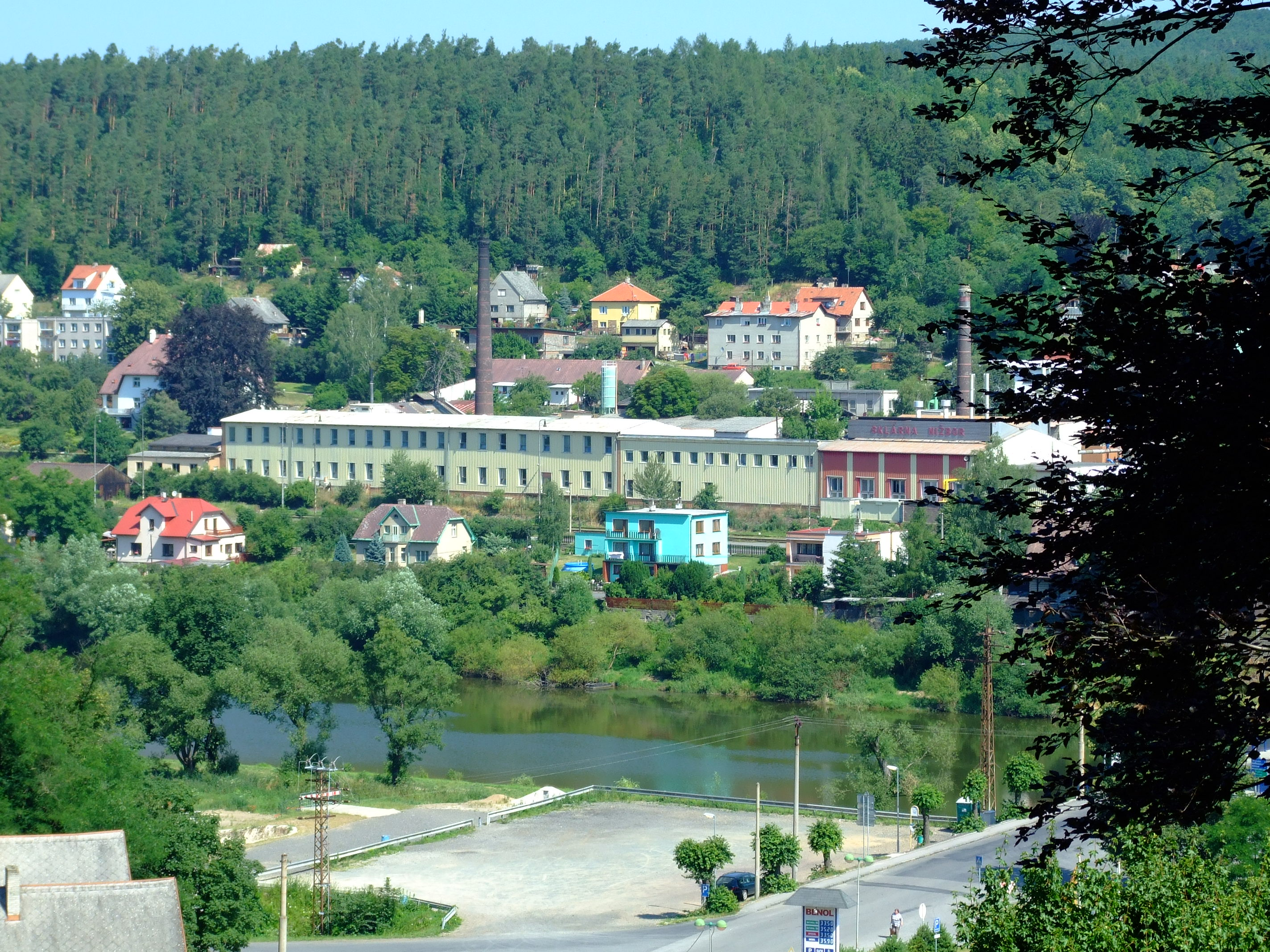
- Founded: 1903
- Headquarters: Nižbor, Czech Republic
- Website: www.ruckl.com/en/

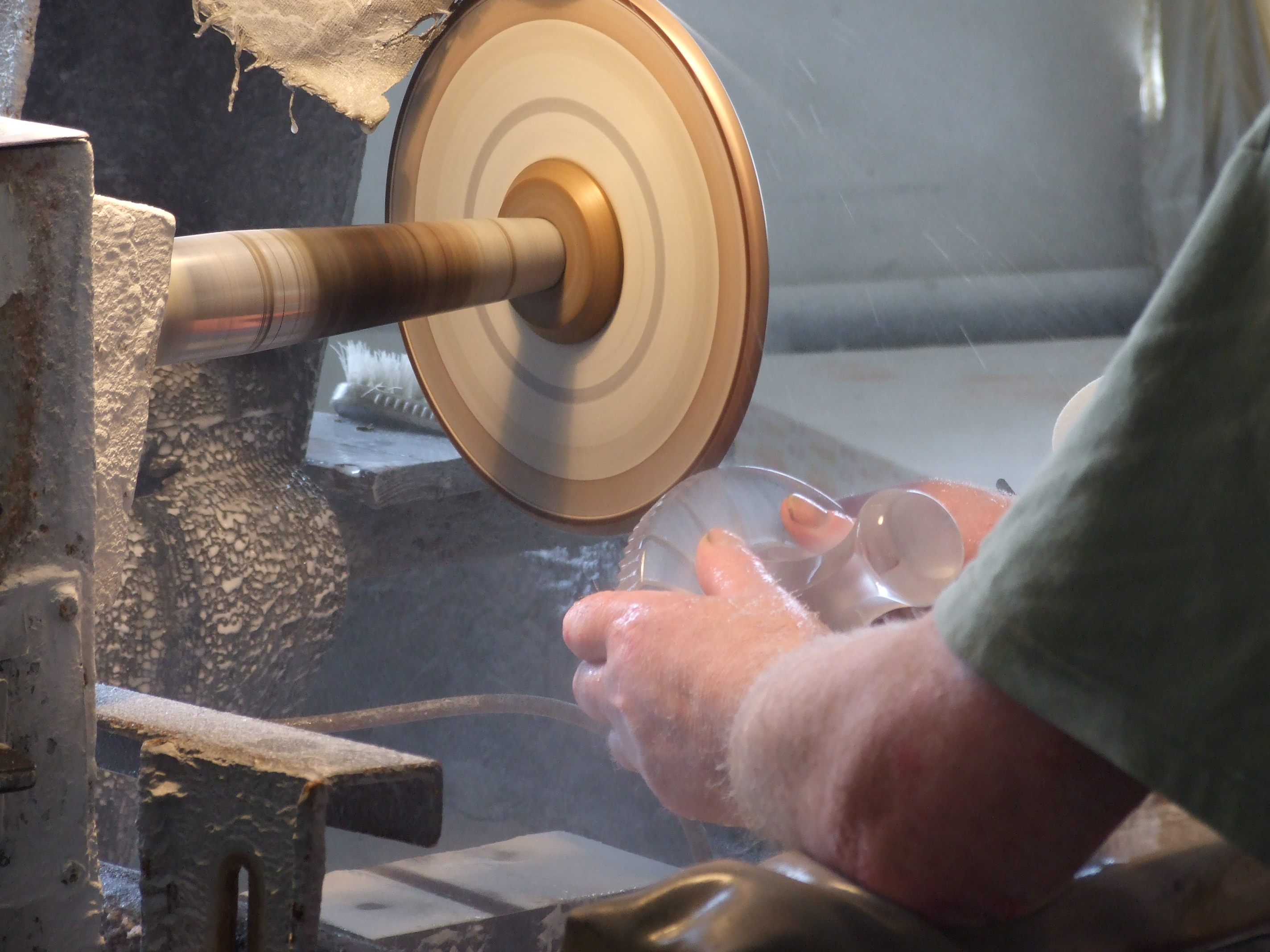
Cutting glass on a rotary wheel

Nižbor glassworks, officially Rückl Crystal, is a Czech glass factory in the municipality of Nižbor, Czech Republic. It lies about 7 km west of the town of Beroun. The glass factory produces 24% lead crystal. The major part of its production is focused on export, but some production is for the market in the Czech Republic.

The company was founded in 1903 by Antonín Rückl, a member of old family of glassmakers whose roots can be traced back to the 17th century. The glassworks soon became known throughout Europe, and in several countries it was also represented. At that time, the Rückls owned a glass factory in Včelnice and Skalice. In 1945 the glassworks was nationalized and incorporated under Bohemian glassworks in 1965. After the revolution in 1989, the great-grandson of glassmaker Antonín Rückl, Jiří Rückl privatized and founded a joint-stock company. At present, the glass factory manufactures hand-cut glass ("cut crystal" for marketing purposes). Most of the production is destined for foreign markets (USA, Japan, Russia), a part for the Czech market.

The glassworks are known for producing a number of different state awards, as for the British Queen Elizabeth II, Pope John Paul II or US President Bill Clinton. The company also produced the Czech Lion Award. The glassworks can also be visited and viewed all of its production, from the mill to the cutting plant. Visitors can get acquainted with the authentic production of hand-blown and hand-cut glass.
