= Lusatian Mountains =

Mountain range in the Czech Republic and Germany

- German: Lausitzer Gebirge; Czech: Lužické hory
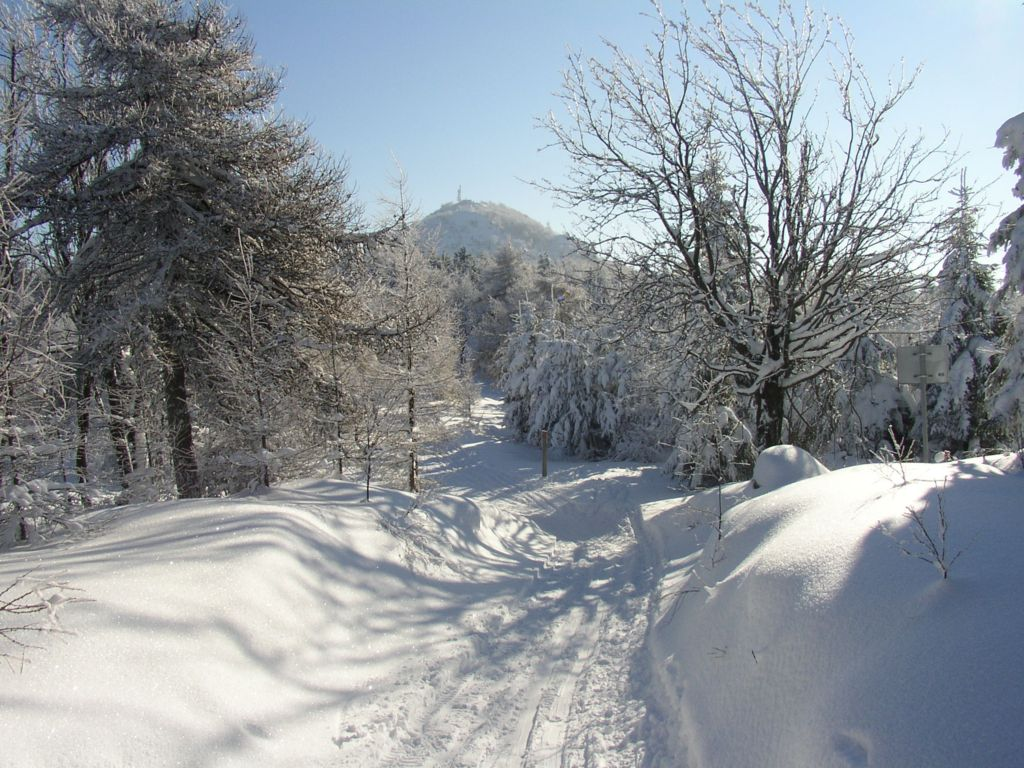
- Cross-country skiing route along the Lusatian Mountains' main ridge. The mountain in the background is the Lausche.

Highest point
- Peak: Lausche/Luž
- Elevation: 793 m (2,602 ft)
- Coordinates: 50°50′56″N 14°38′49″E

Geography
- Western Sudetes with Lusatian Mountains (5)
- Countries: Czech Republic; Germany
- Regions/ States: Liberec; Ústí nad Labem; Saxony
- Parent range: Western Sudetes

Geology
- Rock types: Sandstone; Granite

The Lusatian Mountains (Czech: Lužické hory; German: Lausitzer Gebirge) are a mountain range of the Western Sudetes on the border of the Czech Republic and Germany. They are a continuation of the Ore Mountains range west of the Elbe valley. The mountains of the northern, German, part are called the Zittau Mountains.

== Geography ==
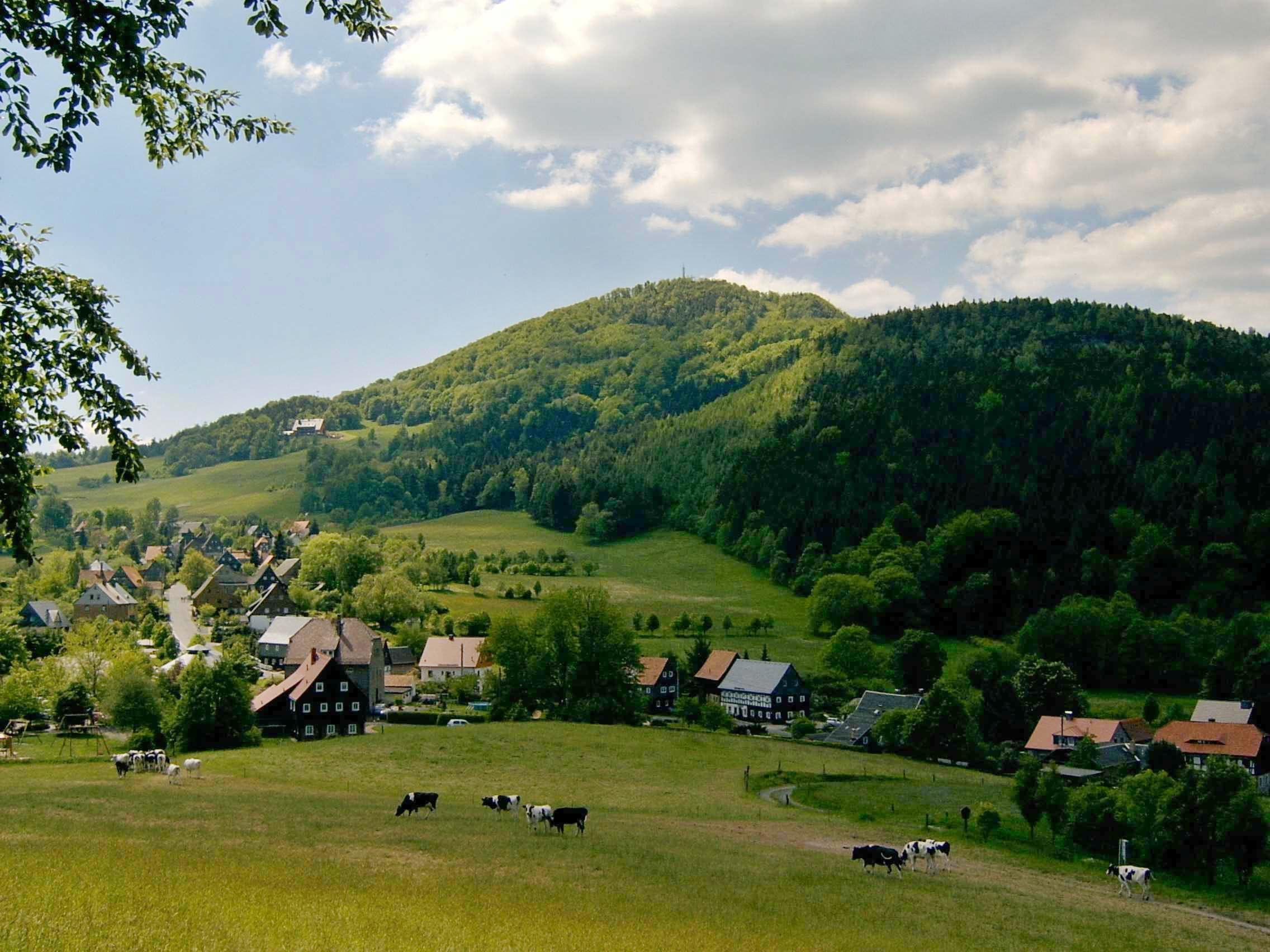
The Lausche, viewed from the north

The range is among the westernmost extensions of the Sudetes, which stretch along the border between the historic region of Silesia in the north, and Bohemia and Moravia in the south up to the Moravian Gate in the east, where they join the Carpathian Mountains. The northwestern foothills of the Lusatian Mountains are called the Lusatian Highlands; in the southwest the range borders on the Central Bohemian Uplands.

The range is largely made up of sandstone sedimentary rocks leaning on a Precambrian crystalline basement. The northern ridge is marked by the Lusatian Fault, a geological disturbance zone separating the Bohemian sandstones from the Lusatian granodiorite. During the Tertiary volcanic magma streams broke through the sandstone layer and solidified into basalt and phonolite. Several sandstone contact areas were also hardened to columns and distinct rock formations.

== Mountains and hills ==
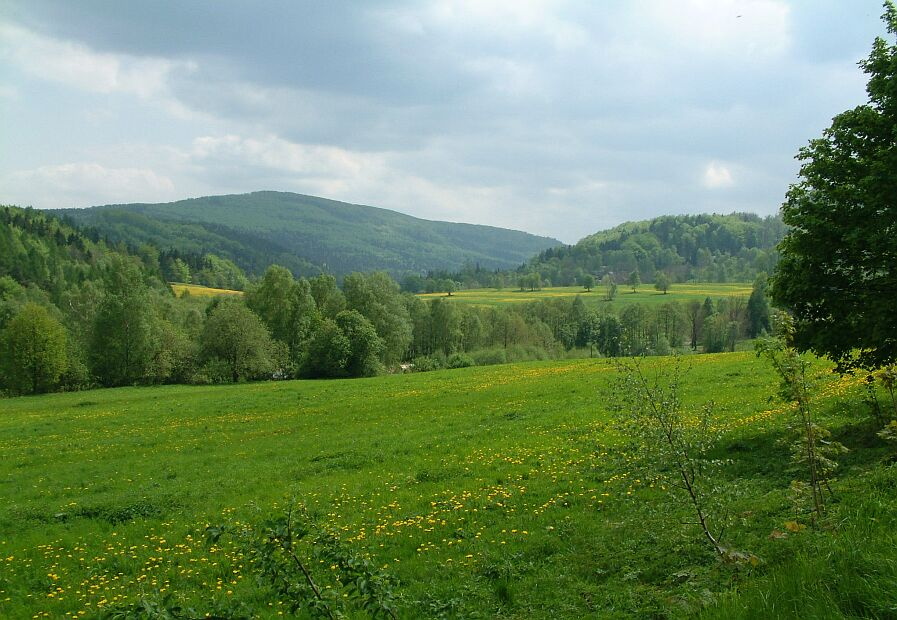
Pěnkavčí vrch

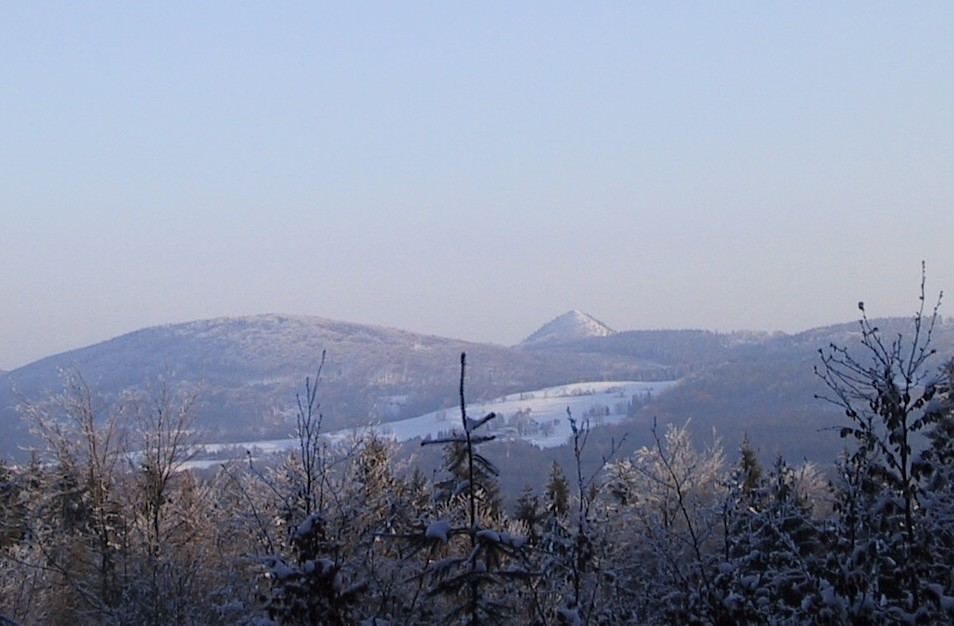
View of Klíč in winter

The highest peak is the Lausche (793 m). The highest peaks of the Lusatian Mountains are:

- Lausche / Luž, 793 m
- Pěnkavčí vrch, 792 m
- Jedlová, 776 m
- Klíč, 760 m
- Hochwald / Hvozd, 749 m
- Studenec, 737 m
- Velký Buk, 736 m
- Malý Buk, 713 m
- Weberberg, 711 m
- Bouřný, 703 m

== Protection ==
The Czech part of the Lusatian Mountains have been a protected landscape area since 1976, covering an area of 264 km^{2} (102 sq mi). Administratively it is known as the Lužické hory Protected Landscape Area. The smaller German part of the mountains also became a nature protection in 2008, when the Zittau Mountain Nature Park was established, with the effect that the entire Lusatian Mountains is now under some form of nature protection.

== See also ==
- List of regions of Saxony
- Lusatian Highlands
- Bohemian track
