= Kreuzkirche (disambiguation) =

Kreuzkirche most commonly refers to the Kreuzkirche, Dresden, a church in Germany.

It may also refer to:

- Kreuzkirche, Hanover, a church in Germany
- Kreuzkirche, Kaliningrad, a church in Russia
- Kreuzkirche, Munich, a church in Germany
- Kreuzkirche, Münster, a church in Germany
- Kreuzkirche am Ölrain, a church in Austria
- Kreuzkirche, Zittau, a former church in Germany
