= Albert Zimmermann =

German painter

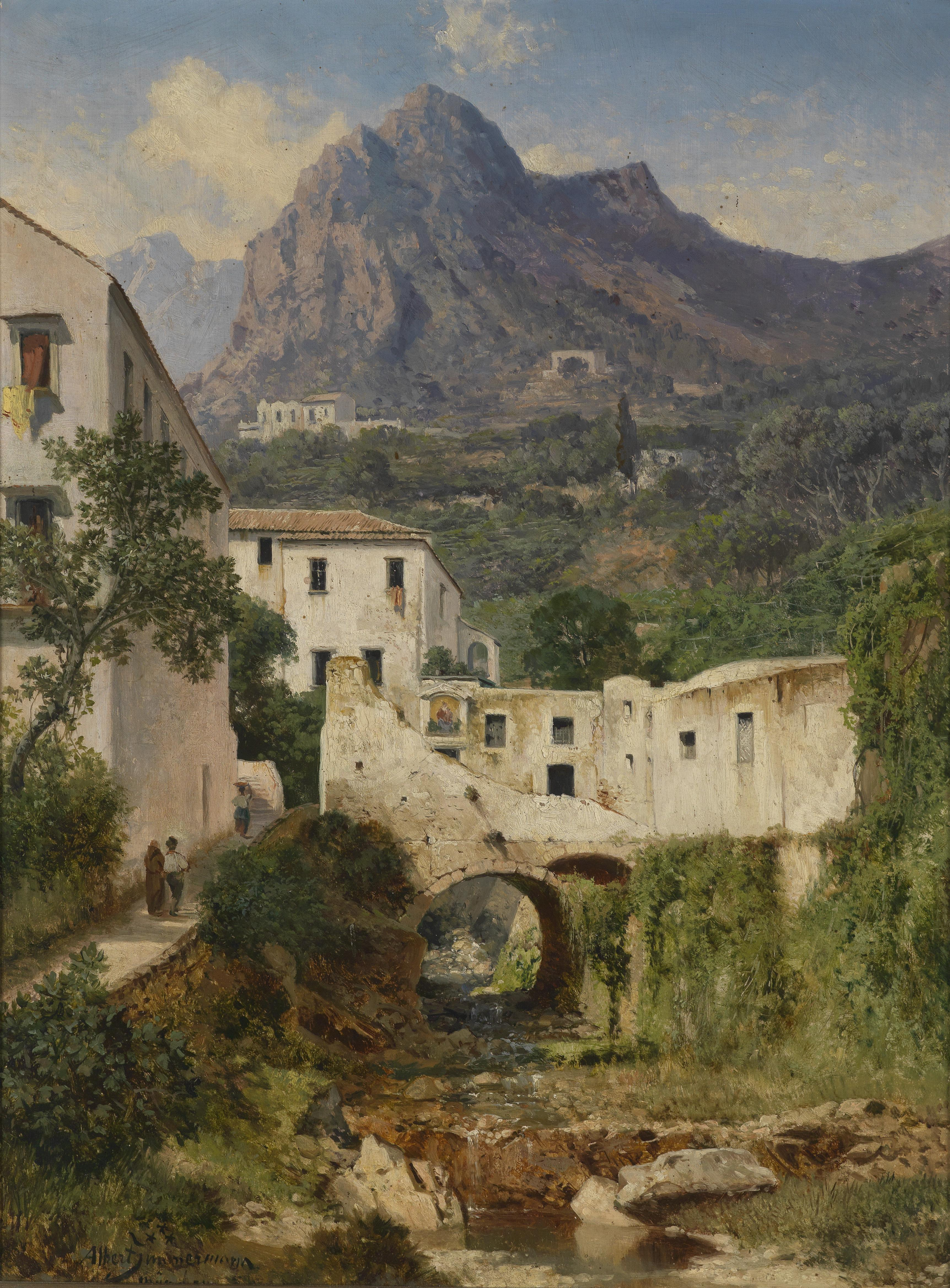
Mill Valley near Amalfi

August Albert Zimmermann (born Zittau, September 20, 1808 - died Munich, October 18, 1888) was a German painter. He was the brother of painters Max, Richard, and Robert Zimmermann, and served as Max's teacher. He was primarily self-taught as a painter, but did study at the Dresden Academy of Fine Arts and the Academy of Fine Arts Munich.
