= Max Zimmermann =

German painter and lithographer (1811–1878)

August Maximilian Zimmermann, painter and lithographer, was born at Zittau, in Saxony on 7 July 1811. His father, the impresario Karl Friedrich August Zimmermann, brought him up as a musician, but in his leisure he practised lithography. At the age of twenty-three he abandoned music to devote himself entirely to lithography, and joining his brother Albert in Munich, studied drawing under his direction. He finally took to landscape painting, which he practised with some success. His subjects were chiefly forest scenes, studies of trees, and the like. The Neue Pinakothek at Munich has three of his pictures. He died at Munich in 1878.

Zimmermann was from an artistic family; besides Albert, his brothers Robert and Richard also became painters.
