= Robert Zimmermann (painter) =

German painter

August Robert Zimmermann (1815–1864), a landscape painter, was born at Zittau. Among his pictures are The Innthal, near Kufstcin, and a Waterfall, both dated 1863. He died at Munich. He was the brother of painters Albert, Richard, and Max Zimmermann.
