= Zittau =

Zittau Sitte (Upper Lusatian dialect)
- Town
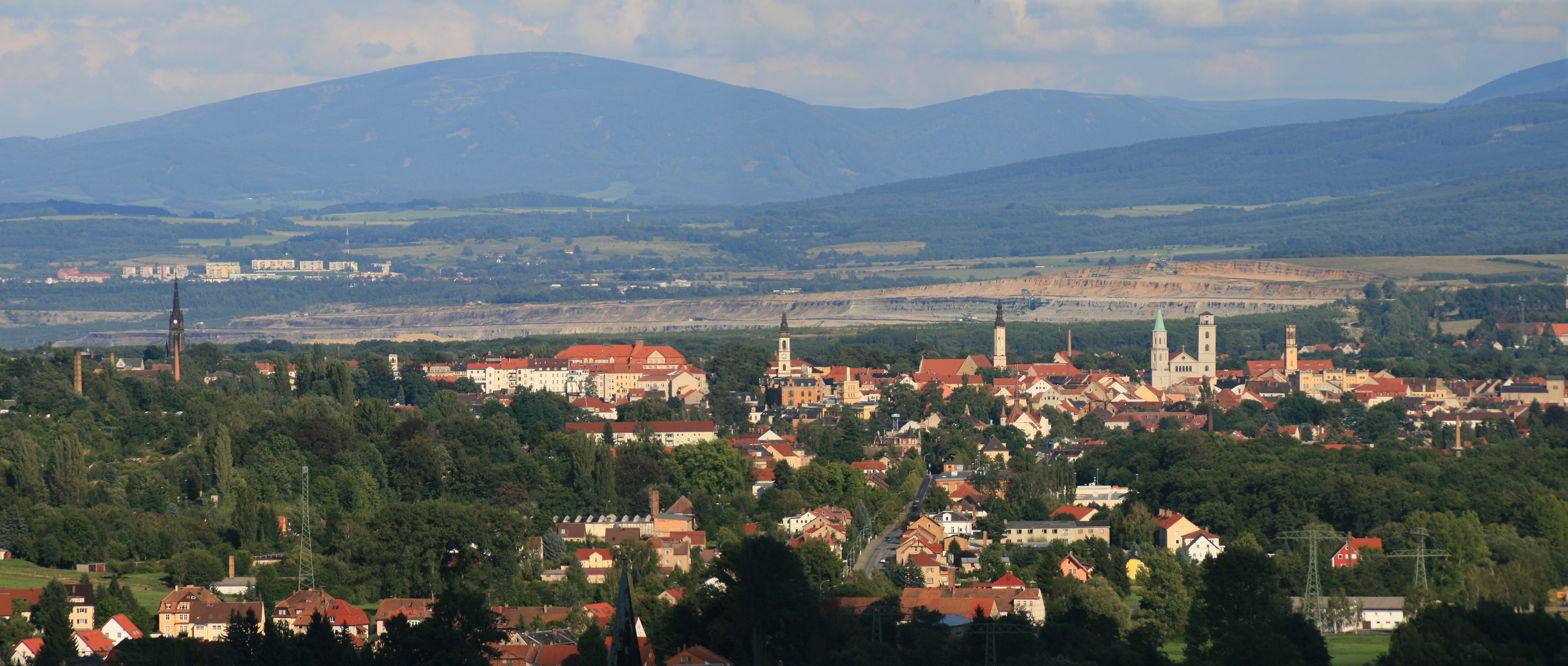
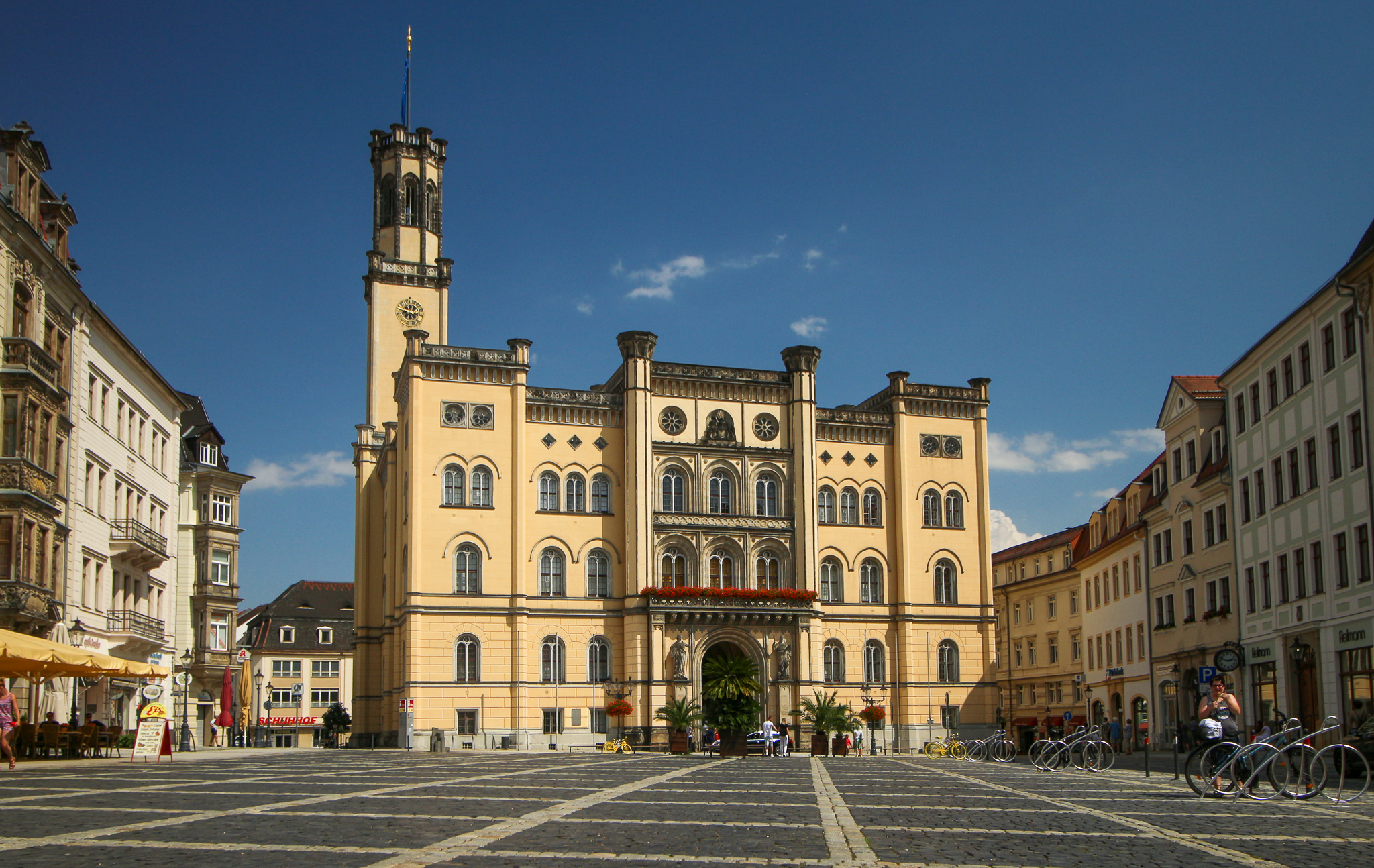
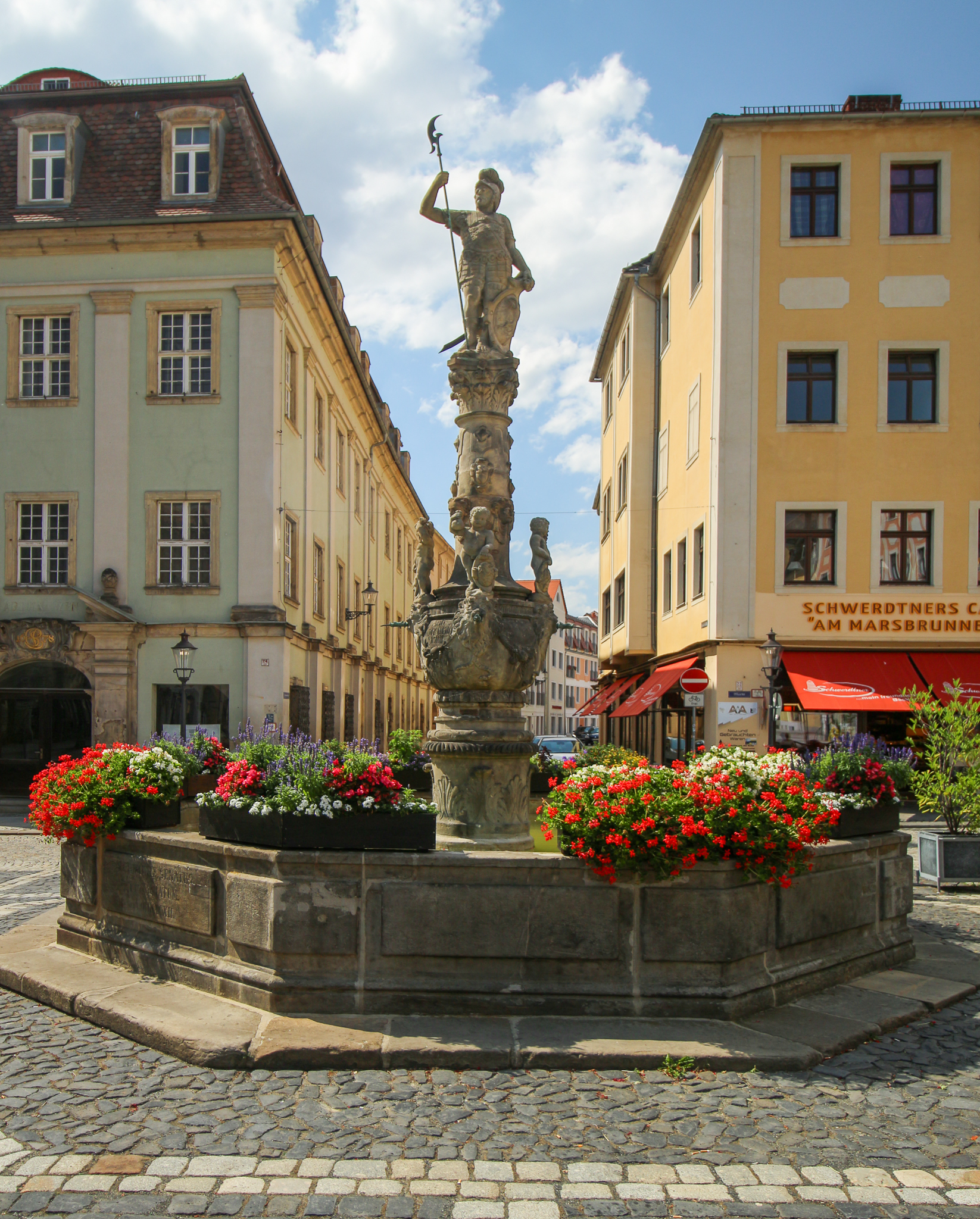
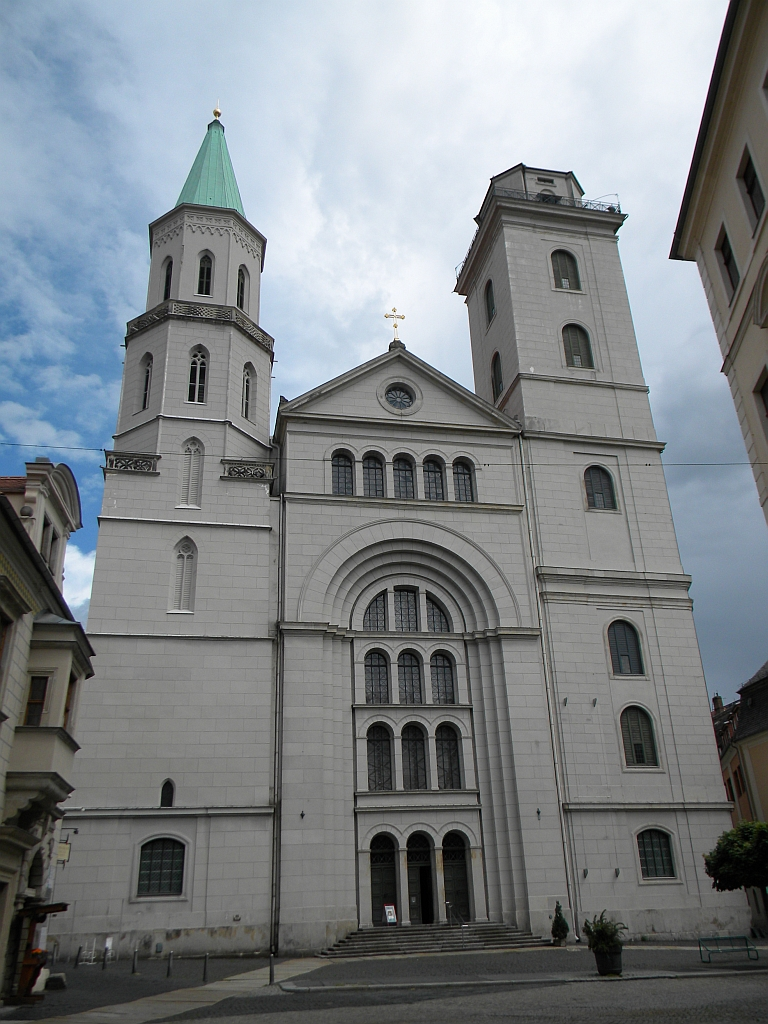
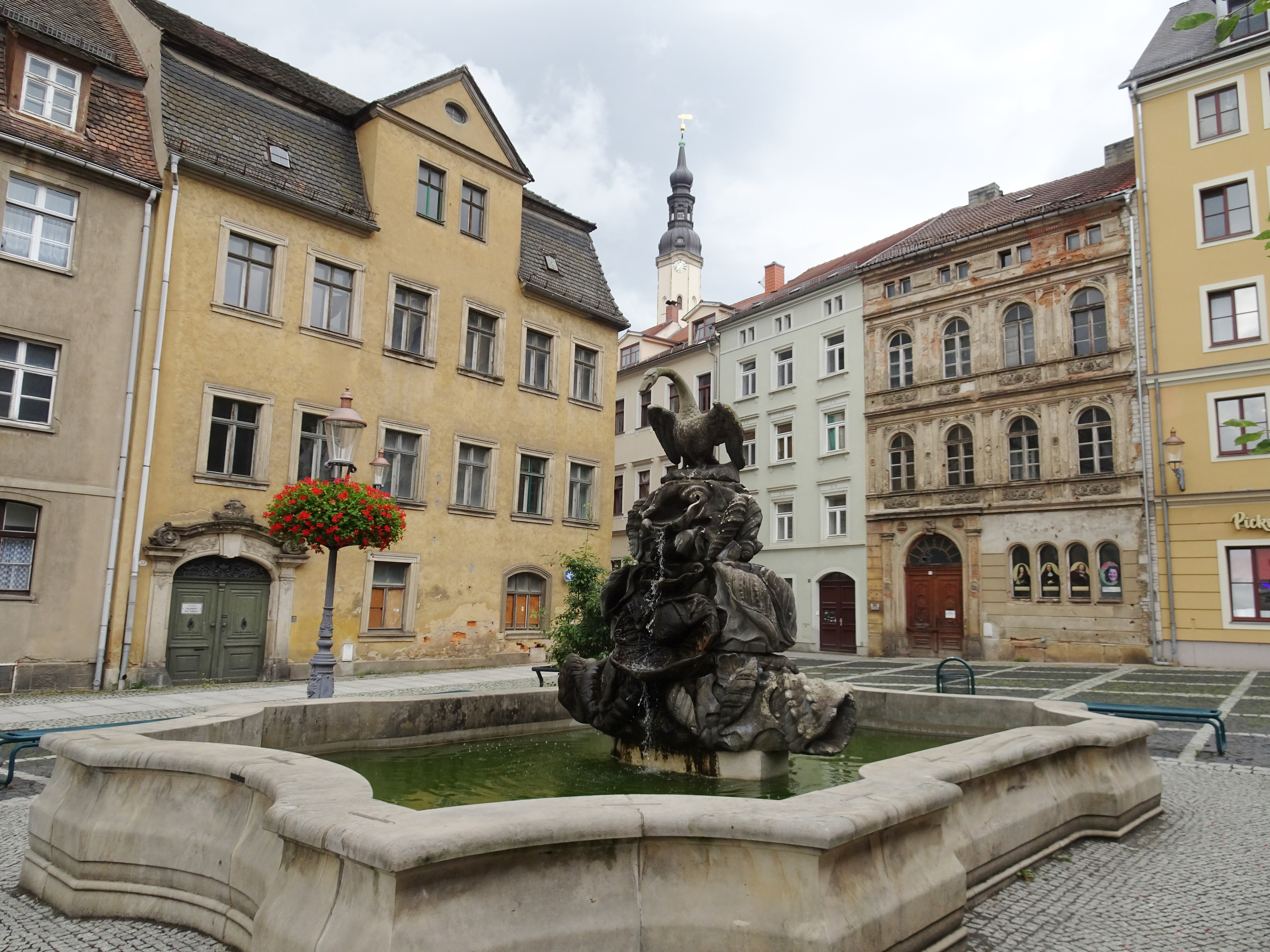
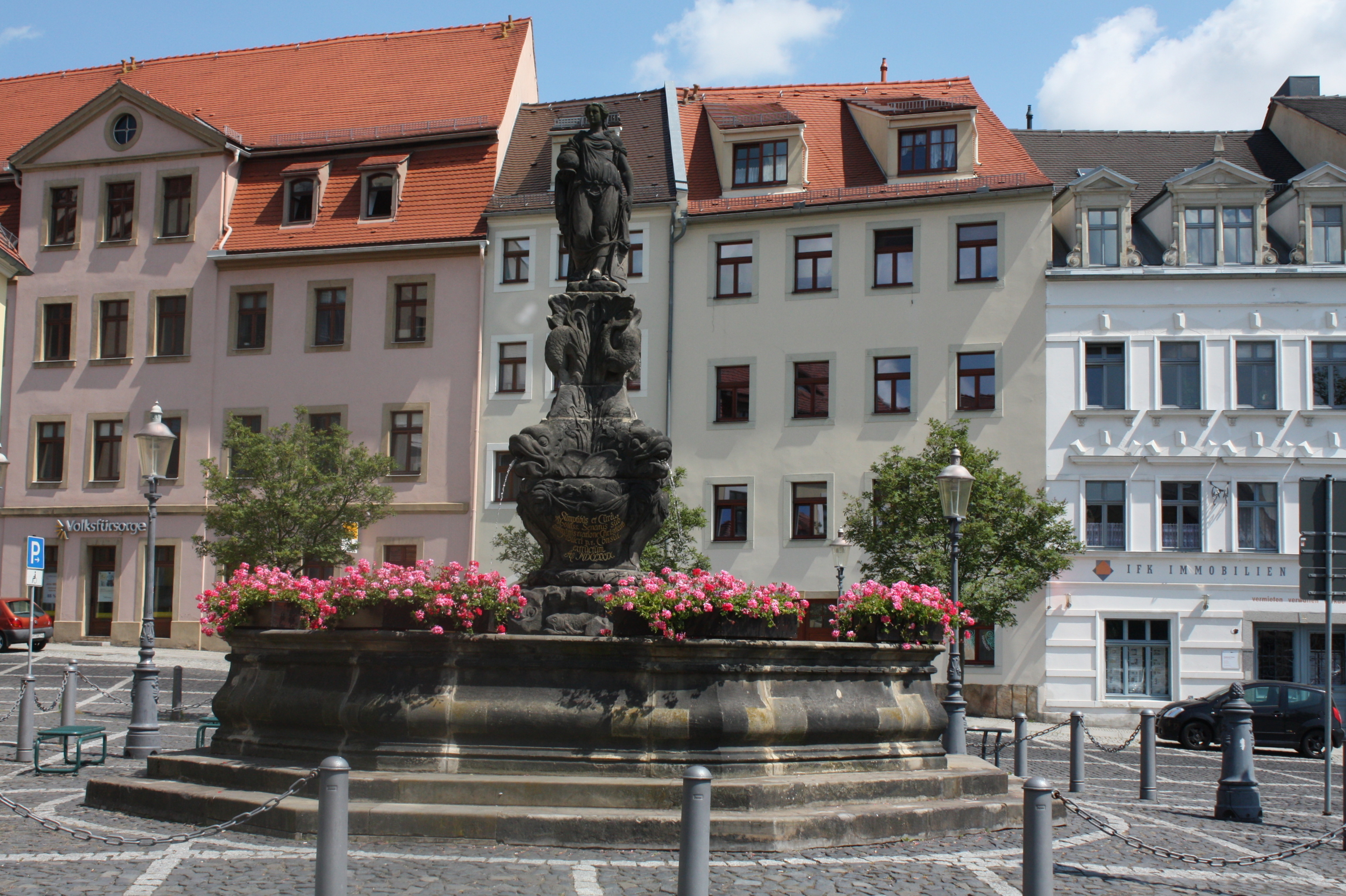
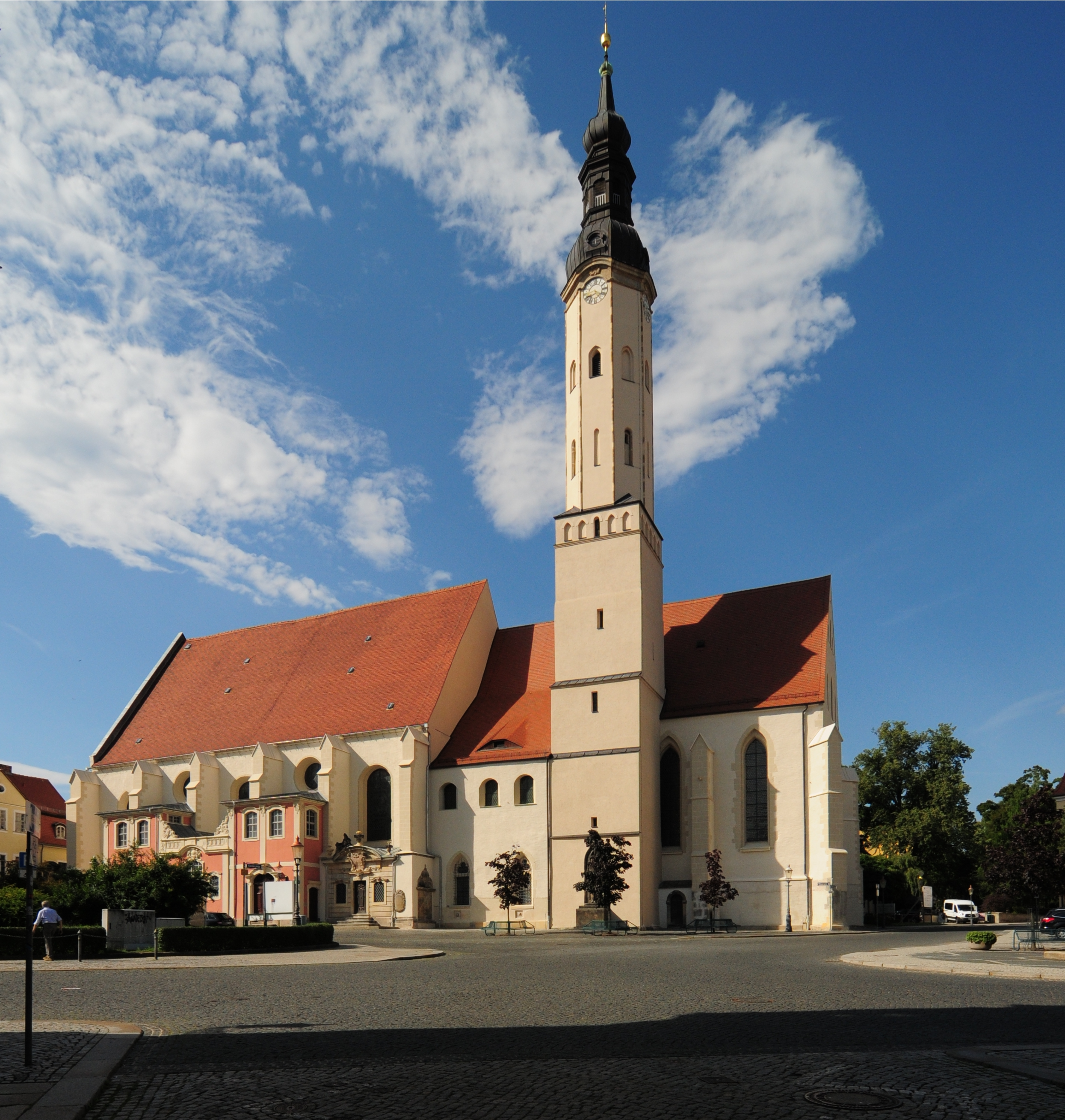
- View of Zittau with the Turów Coal Mine Zittau town hall Roland Fountain St John's Church Swan Fountain Samaritan's Fountain Monastery Church

- Coat of arms

- Location of Zittau within Görlitz district
- Interactive map of Zittau
- Location within Germany Location within Saxony
- Coordinates: 50°53′46″N 14°48′26″E
- Country: Germany
- State: Saxony
- District: Görlitz

Government
  - Mayor (2022–29): Thomas Zenker

Area
  - Total: 66.75 km^{2} (25.77 sq mi)
- Elevation: 242 m (794 ft)

Population (2025-12-31)
  - Total: 24,958
  - Density: 373.9/km^{2} (968.4/sq mi)
- Time zone: UTC+01:00 (CET)
  - Summer (DST): UTC+02:00 (CEST)
- Postal codes: 02763
- Dialling codes: 03583
- Vehicle registration: GR, ZI
- Website: www.zittau.de

Zittau (German: [ˈtsɪtaʊ]; Upper Sorbian: Žitawa [ˈʒitawa]; Lower Sorbian: Žytawa [ˈʒɨtawa]; Polish: Żytawa [ˈʐɨtava]; Czech: Žitava; Upper Lusatian dialect: Sitte (Note: From Slavic languages for 'rye' – Upper Sorbian and Czech: žito Lower Sorbian: žyto; Polish: żyto.)) is a city in the German state of Saxony, belonging to the district of Görlitz, Germany's easternmost district.

Zittau is located in Upper Lusatia, the southern part of Lusatia, on the Mandau and Lusatian Neisse rivers, in the foreland of the Zittau Mountains. The city has a population of around 25,000 and is located directly on the western edge of the Turów Coal Mine, one of the largest artificial holes visible from space, on the other side of the Lusatian Neisse. The Großes Zittauer Fastentuch (Great Zittau Lenten Cloth) is, along with the Bayeux Tapestry, one of the most impressive textile works in Western tradition. It is the third-largest existing Lenten veil. It was made in Zittau in 1472 and is now exhibited in the secularized Kirche zum Heiligen Kreuz, that belongs to the Zittau Municipal Museums, where it is kept in the largest museum display case in the world.

== Geography ==
Zittau sits on the Mandau River, while the Lusatian Neisse, which forms the border with Poland, touches the city in the east. The confluence of both rivers is located in the southeast of the city. Further south is a tripoint of Germany, Poland and the Czech Republic, and the incorporated village of Hartau lies where the Lusatian Neisse forms the German/Czech border for a short distance. Zittau lies in the Zittau Basin, just north of the Zittau Mountains (part of the Sudetes).

== Climate ==
The climate is cool temperate with cool winters and warm summers with an average annual temperature of 8.6 °C. The annual precipitation total is 883 mm. All twelve months are humid. The climate classification according to Köppen and Geiger is Cfb.

== History ==
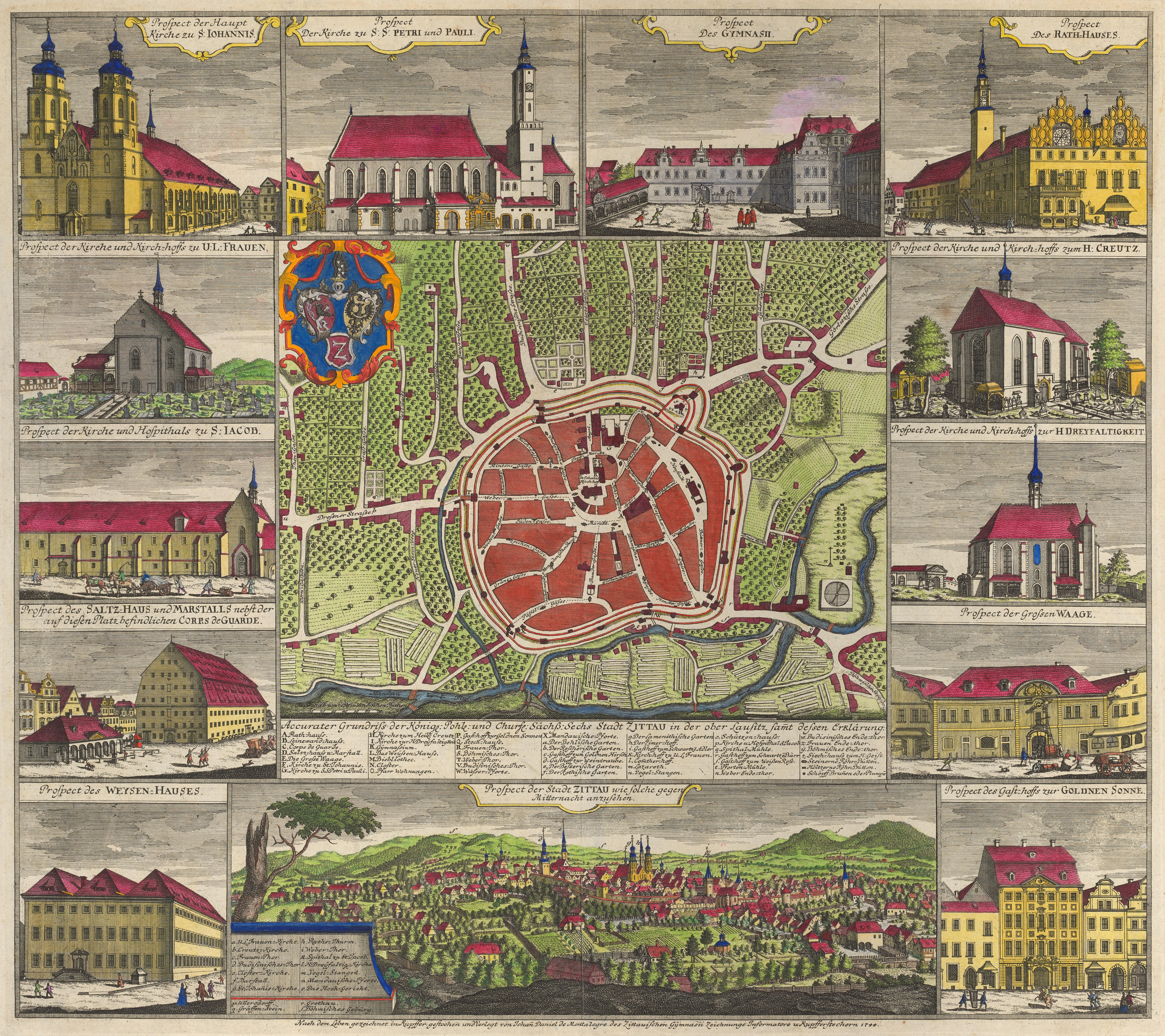
Zittau in 1744

The history of the city dates back to a 12th-century Slavic settlement. The area belonged to the Czech (Bohemian) Duchy (and later Kingdom) from the 11th century. It was first mentioned under the Latinized name Sitavia in 1238. It was granted town rights in 1255 by King Ottokar II of Bohemia, who also built defensive walls. In 1319 it passed to the Piast-ruled Duchy of Jawor of then-fragmented Poland, and after the death of Duke Henry I of Jawor in 1346, it became part of the Czech (Bohemian) Crown again. The city's coat of arms still shows a Czech Lion and a Silesian Piast Eagle. In 1346 the city became one of the members of the Six-City League of Upper Lusatia. At that time the city was granted a special title—it was called "Die Reiche" ("the Rich") because of its high proportion of well-to-do citizens. In 1359 and 1422 it suffered great fires. In 1469, together with the Lusatian League, the city recognized Hungarian King Matthias Corvinus as rightful ruler, thus passing to Hungary, and after his death in 1490 the city returned to the Bohemian Crown, then under the rule of Polish prince Vladislaus II. It remained part of it until 1635 when it passed to the Electorate of Saxony.

During the Counter-Reformation, especially following the Battle of White Mountain in 1620, a large number of Protestant refugees from Bohemia came to Zittau, where the Protestant Saxon rulers took them in. Many of them went on to find refuge in surrounding villages, in Dresden, and in Berlin in Brandenburg. Primarily as a result of the near-complete destruction of the city during the Seven Years' War, Zittau's then prosperity is reflected today in only a few exceptional buildings and the cemeteries where the well-to-do were buried.

One of the most important trading goods of this early age in the 16th century was beer. Later in the 18th and 19th century textiles became important too, a tradition common in the region of Upper Lusatia.

In 1813, two Polish military units were established in the city, that is the 1st Horse Artillery Company of the Jan Henryk Dąbrowski Division and 2nd Horse Artillery Company of the VIII Corps of Prince Józef Poniatowski.

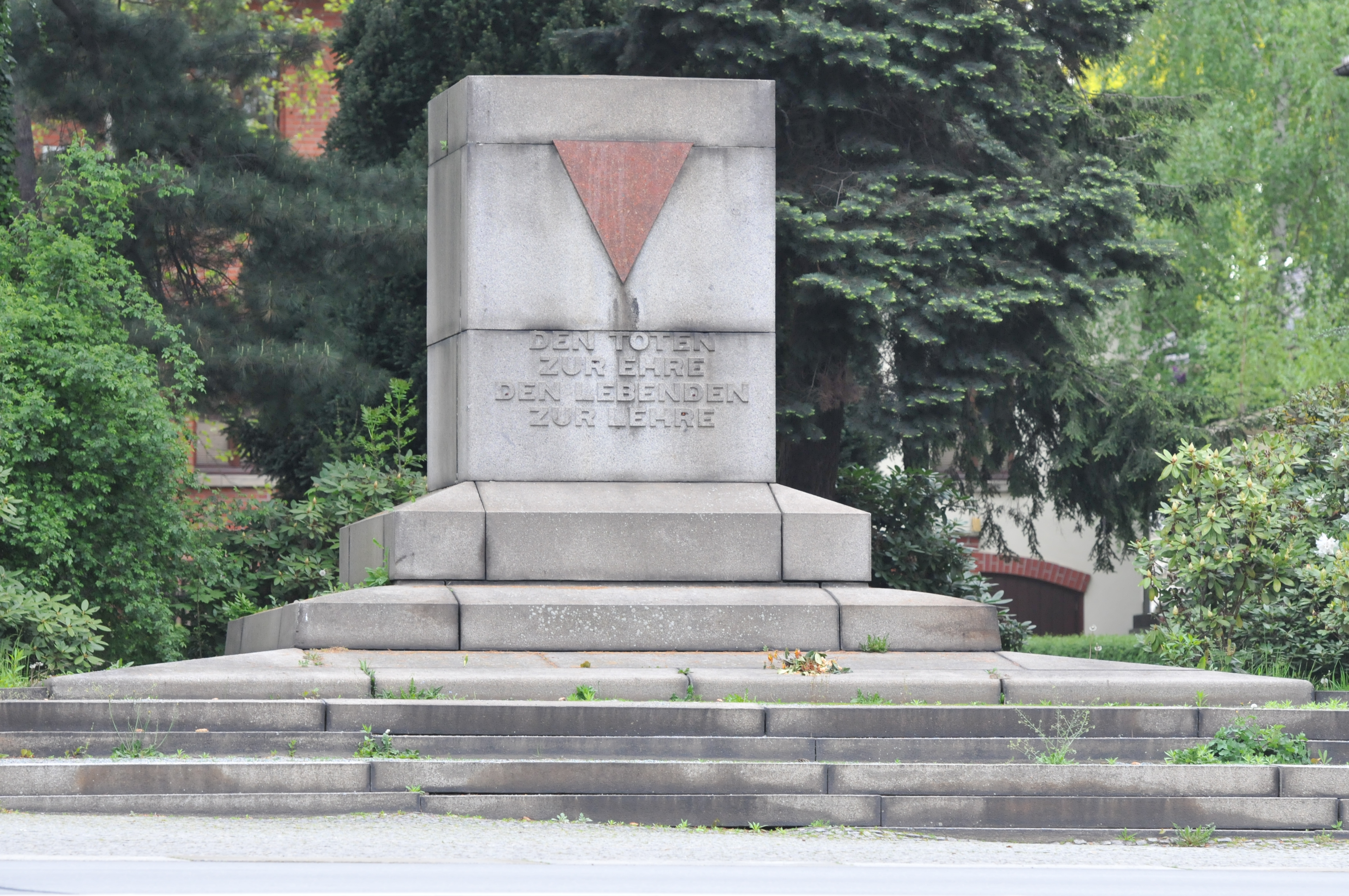
Memorial to the victims of Nazi Germany

During World War II, a Nazi prison and a labour camp was located in the city. The camp provided forced labour for Phänomen Werke Gustav Hiller, a truck and motorcycle manufacturing company (which became VEB Kraftfahrzeugwerk Phänomen after the war, renamed VEB Robur-Werke Zittau in 1957).

== Politics ==
=== Lord mayors ===
- 2001-2015: Arnd Voigt ("Free citizens Zittau"))
- since August 2015: Thomas Zenker ("Zittau can do more").

=== Local council ===
The local council has 26 members, the results of the elections in August 2014 are:

| Party/List | Vote share 2014 | Seats; 2014 | Seats; 2009 |
| CDU | 22,8% | 7 | 9 |
| The Left | 15,4% | 4 | 5 |
| SPD | 7,4% | 2 | 2 |
| FDP | 5,4% | 1 | 2 |
| Alliance 90/The Greens | 3,3% | 1 | 1 |
| NPD | 8,1% | 2 | 1 |
| Freie Bürger Zittau (Free citizens Zittau) | 8,4% | 2 | 5 |
| Freie Unabhängige Wähler (FUW) (Free independent voters) | 8,3% | 2 | 1 |
| Zittau kann mehr e.V. (ZKM) (Zittau can do more) | 18,5% | 5 | – |

=== Reichstag deputies ===
Following the North German Confederation Treaty the Kingdom of Saxony entered the North German Confederation in 1866. This continued after the founding of the German Empire on 18 January 1871. Following this Saxony participated in Reichstag elections from February 1867. Zittau returned a series of Reichstag Deputies until 1919 when the existing constituencies were scrapped.

== Main sights ==
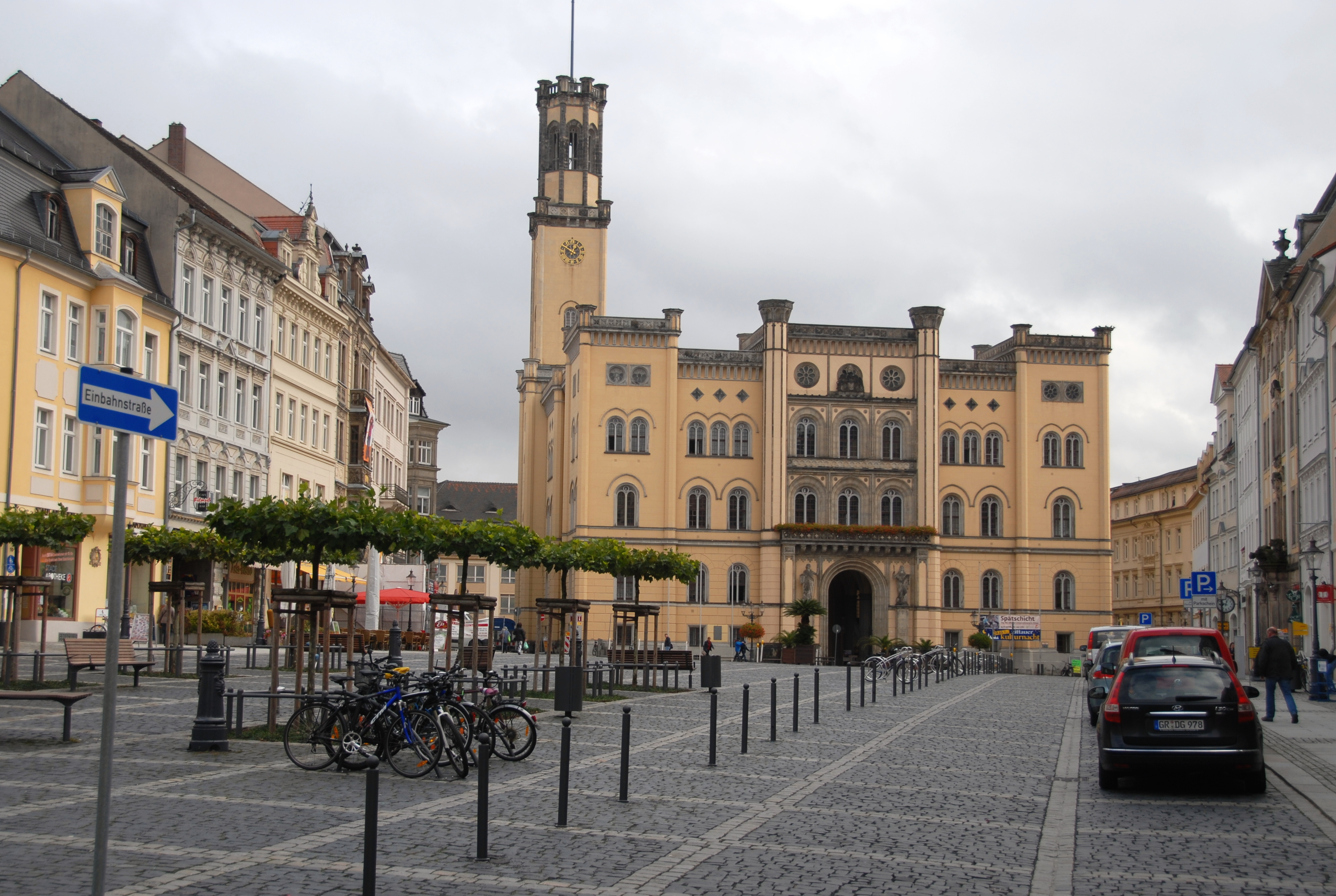
Zittau town hall

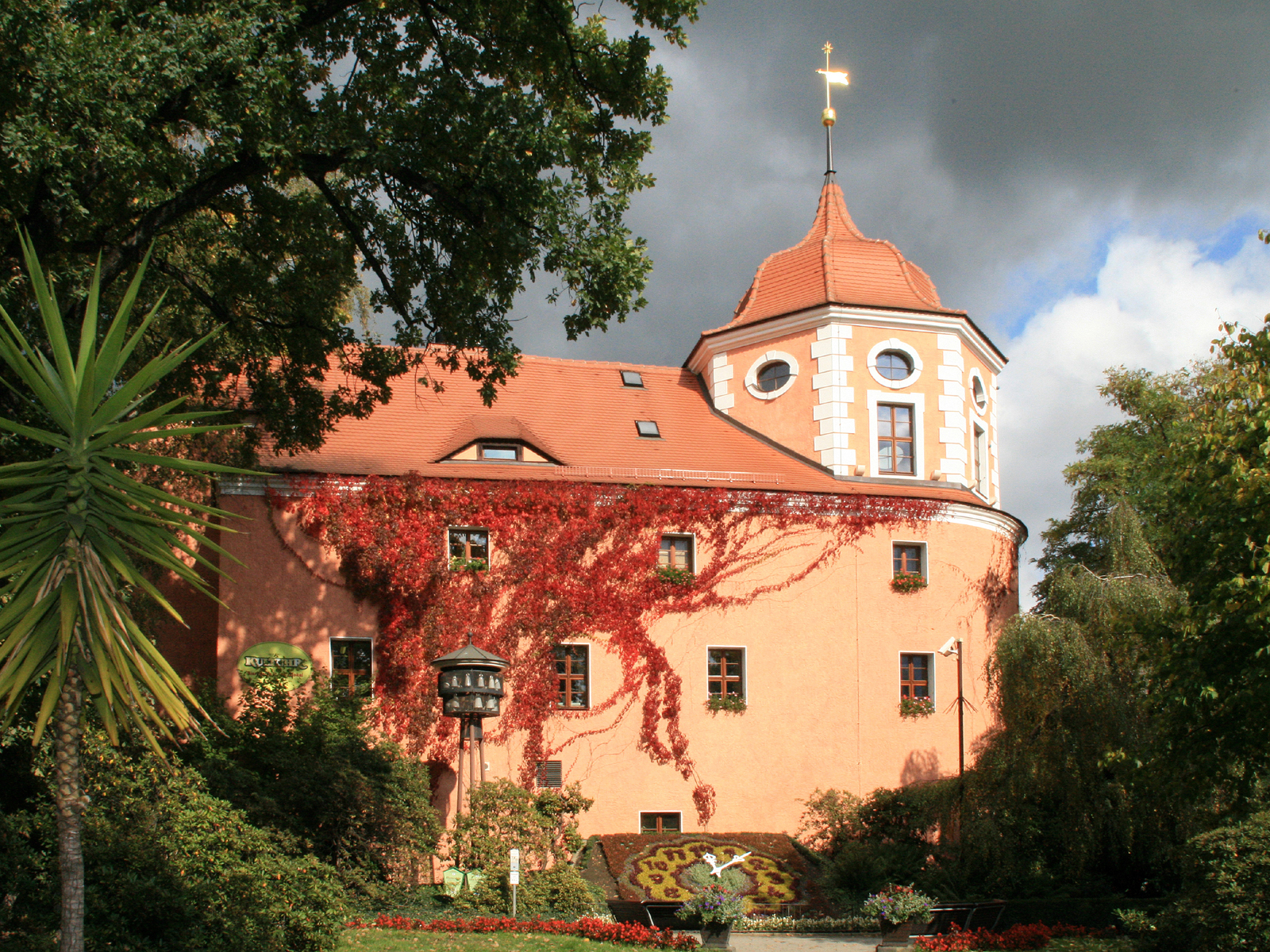
Flower Clock and Fleischerhaus

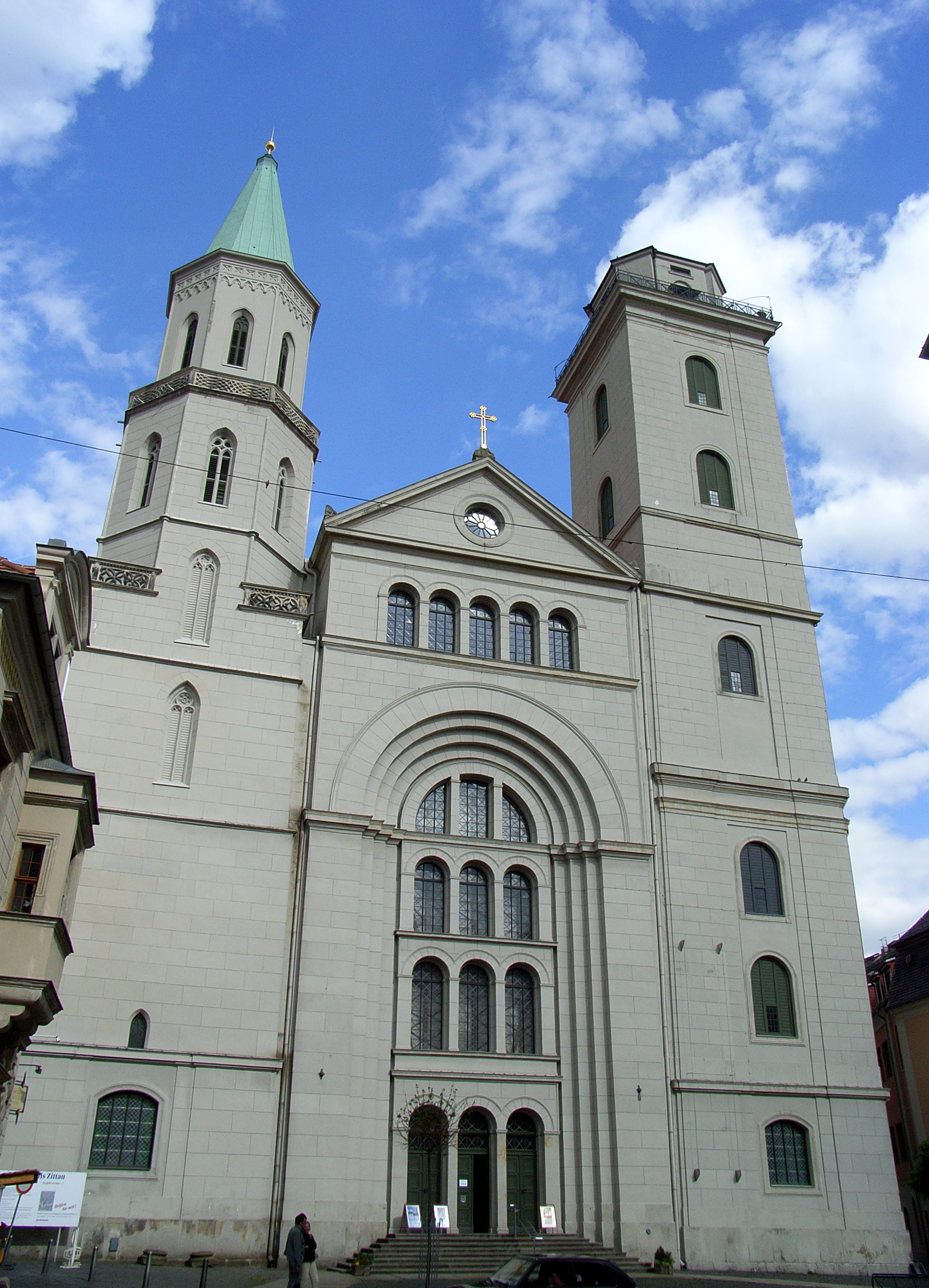
St John's Church

- Church of our Lady: A semi-gothic church that is first mentioned in 1355.
- City Hall: Designed by Karl Friedrich Schinkel and built in Italian palazzo style between 1840 and 1845.
- Flower Clock: A notable Zittau attraction, the flower clock was built in 1907 from a clockwork of an old Tower clock and contains approximately 4800 plants planted three times annually.
- Friary Church: It was the church of the Franciscan Monastery. Their high altar was sacred to the apostles Peter and Paulus in 1293. The main aisle dates from 1480 and was built in the style of late gothic. In the years 1696, 1731 and 1748 prayer rooms were built on the south side of the church. These were special seating areas for wealthy citizens.
- Markt: The main central square
- St John's Church: Originally built in 1230 in the Romanesque style of the Order of Saint John, whose patron saint was John the Baptist. It was later dedicated also to John the Evangelist. The building was destroyed in 1757 by Austrian soldiers during the Seven Years' War. The current building was built between 1766 and 1837.
- Zittau Lenten Altar Cloths, two large decorated cloths which were used to hide the altar during Lent. The big lenten altar cloth (56 m^{2}) from 1472 is shown in the Gothic Holy Cross Church, the little lenten altar cloth (15 m^{2}) from 1573, one of six lenten altar cloths of the Arma Christi type in the world, in the Museum of Cultural History in the former Franciscan Monastery. .
- Several historic fountains: Green Fountain (1679), Roland or Mars Fountain (1585), Fountain of the Samaritan Woman (1679), Hercules Fountain (1708), Swan Fountain (1710), Little Grinder's Fountain (early 19th century).
- Neustadt square with the Salt House, warehouse and stables built in 1511 (the roof dates from 1730).
- Old Grammar School and Dornspach's House, Renaissance buildings.
- Building Crafts College (Baugewerkeschule), a Gothic Revival building from 1846/48 by Carl August Schramm.
- Urban Swimming-Bath (1873) and the Johanneum, a school building from 1869/71, both Neoclassical buildings.
- Heinrich Marschner's Birthplace, a house from 17th century.

== Culture ==
There are roughly 3,500 students studying at the Zittau/Görlitz University of Applied Sciences and at the independent International Graduate School, Germany's smallest university; it caters to students from nearby Poland and the Czech Republic.

== Transport ==
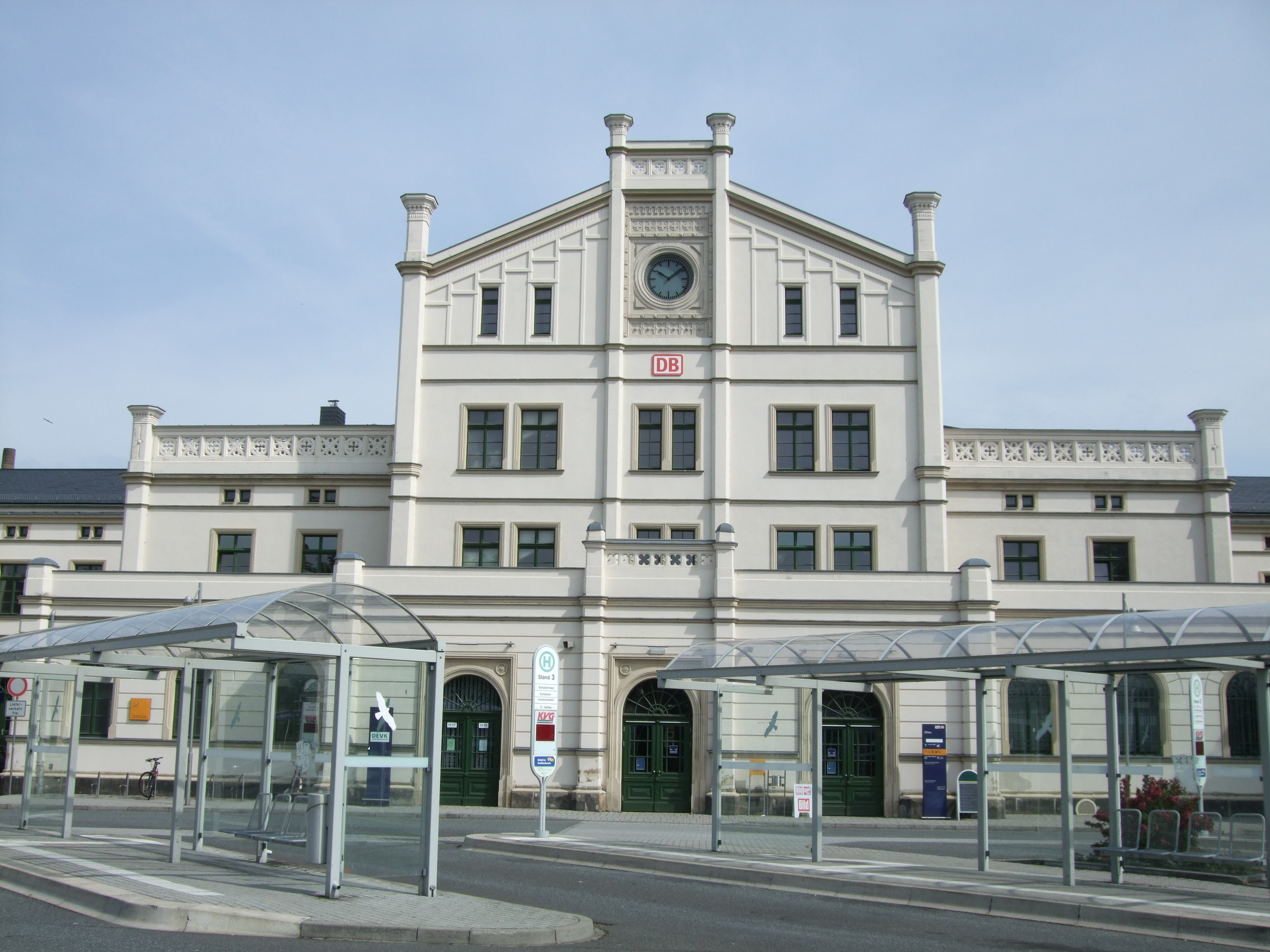
Zittau railway station, the station building and the bus station in front of it

=== Road ===
The city lacks connections to good infrastructure in Germany, but a direct link is planned to the nearest motorway between Bautzen and Görlitz. The town is relatively well-connected to Liberec and the rest of the Czech Republic through dual-carriageway 35 just south of the town.

=== Rail ===
Zittau railway station is located north of the town's centre. Passenger services are operated by three railway companies. The first being Vogtlandbahn, which provides a services from Dresden to Zittau and then directly through to Liberec in the Czech Republic. The second is Ostdeutsche Eisenbahn (ODEG), which links Zittau to Görlitz, with connections to Poland, and Cottbus, where connections to Berlin exist. Zittau is located on the Zittau–Löbau railway which was originally opened in 1848, making it one of the oldest railways in Germany.

The Zittau–Kurort Oybin/Kurort Jonsdorf railway with all together four stations within Zittau's limits is a heritage narrow-gauge railway taking passengers from Zittau to the mountain spa resort towns of Oybin and Jonsdorf in the Zittau Mountains. It is operated by the Saxon-Upper Lusatian Railway Company.

=== Air ===
The nearest airports are Dresden Airport, which is located 117 km (73 mi) north west and Prague Václav Havel Airport, located 148 km (92 mi) south of Zittau.

== Border crossings ==
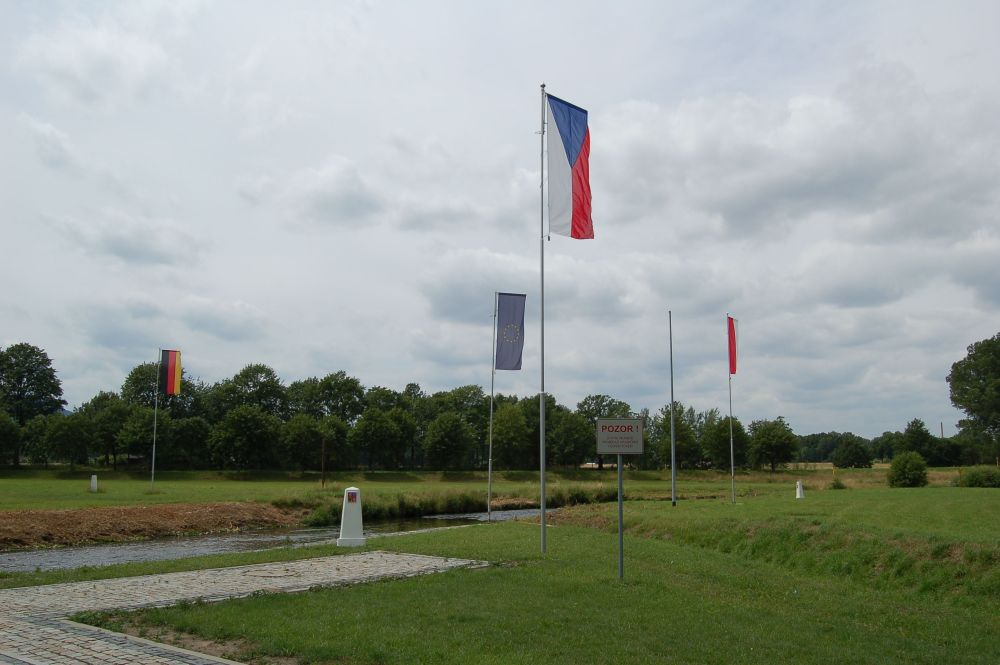
The Czech-German-Polish tripoint near Zittau, looking into Germany from the Czech Republic

Zittau is located close to the point where the Czech Republic, Germany, and Poland meet and there are several international border crossings in the vicinity. Permanent immigration and customs controls were, however, removed on 21 December 2007, when all three countries became part of the Schengen Area.

=== Germany–Czech Republic ===
- Hartau – Hrádek nad Nisou: Located in the village of Hartau south of Zittau, this crossing is for pedestrians only.

=== Germany–Poland ===
- Zittau Chopinstraße – Sieniawka: This crossing-point consists of a road bridge over the Lausitzer Neisse River which forms the border between Germany and Poland to the east of Zittau. The Polish town after the crossing is Sieniawka (Kleinschönau before 1945).
- Zittau Friedenstraße – Porajów: Also consisting of a road bridge over the Lausitzer Neisse River south of Zittau. The Polish village after the border is Porajów (Großporitsch). This crossing is used for those proceeding to the Czech Republic via the Czech–Polish border crossing south of Porajów. The Czech border crossing is located at Hrádek nad Nisou (Grottau).
- Zittau Lusatiaweg – Porajów: this formerly closed bridge was re-opened to pedestrians and cyclists in December 2007.

Zittau is the only city along the Oder–Neisse line where a number of river bridges remain closed as international crossing-points between Germany and Poland even though both countries are in the Schengen Area.

== Twin towns – sister cities ==
Zittau is twinned with:

- Bogatynia, Poland
- Hrádek nad Nisou, Czech Republic
- Liberec, Czech Republic
- Pistoia, Italy
- Portsmouth, United States
- Villingen-Schwenningen, Germany
- Zielona Góra, Poland

== Notable people ==
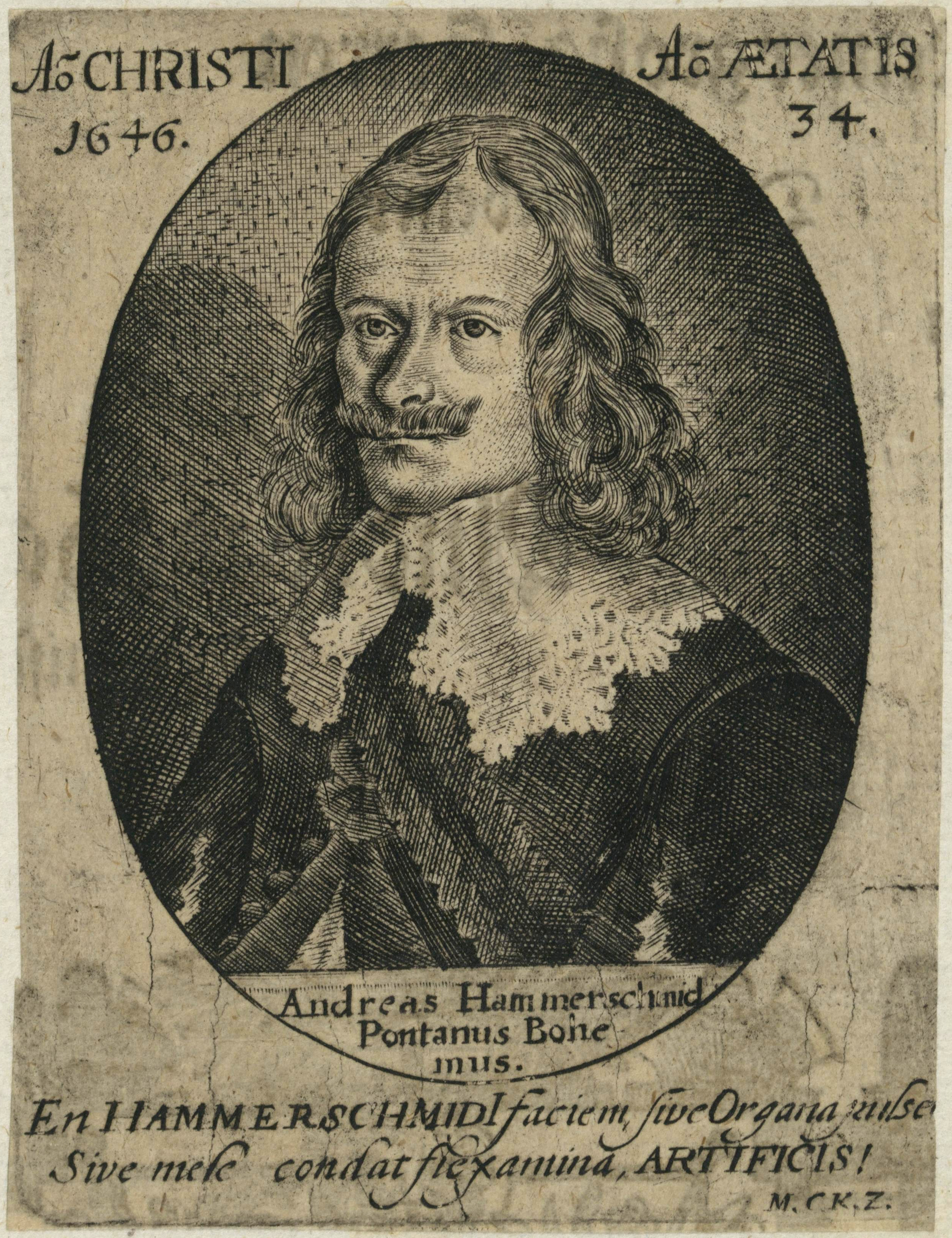
Andreas Hammerschmidt

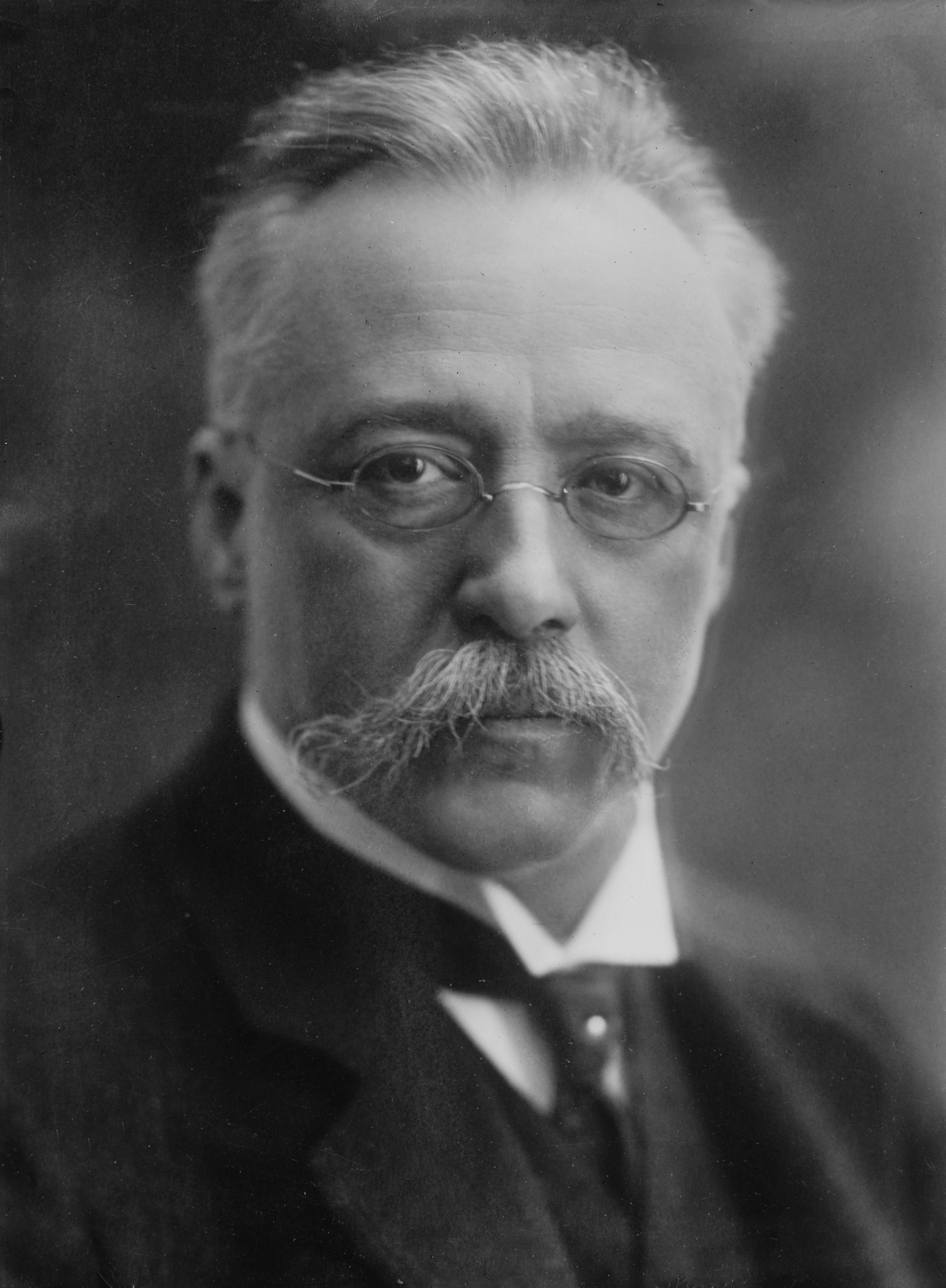
Max Fiedler around 1900

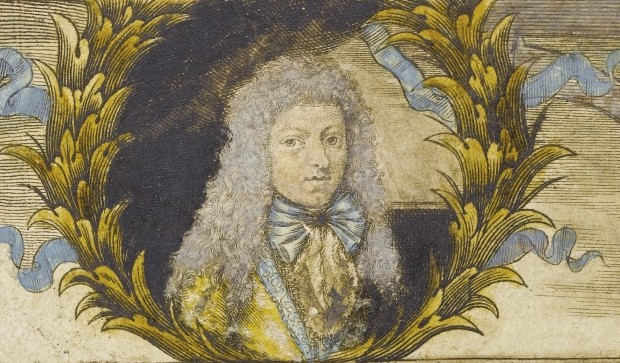
Johann Kuhnau

- Ernst Baier (1905–2001), figure skater, 1936 Olympic champion
- Max Fiedler (1859–1939), conductor and composer
- Melchior Franck (1579–1639), composer
- Gottfried Grünewald (1673–1739), composer, operatic bass, pantaleon virtuoso and harpsichordist
- Andreas Hammerschmidt (c. 1611–1675), composer and organist
- Gotthard Handrick (1908–1979), athlete and fighter pilot
- Moritz Haupt (1808–1874), philologist
- Lutz Heilmann (born 1976), politician (The Left)
- Henriette Heinze (born 1973), actress
- Fritz Hertzsch (1892–1941), General major in World War II
- Michael Hans Kater (1937–2025), German-Canadian historian
- Christian Keymann (1607–1662), hymnwriter
- Alfred Klotz (1874–1956), philologist
- Johann Krieger (1651–1735), composer and organist
- Johann Kuhnau (1660–1722), composer, organist and harpsichordist
- Theodor Leupold, cyclist
- Albert Johann Ludovici (1820–1894), artist
- Wolfgang Makatsch (1906–1983), ornithologist and oologist
- Heinrich Marschner (1795–1861), composer
- Stephan Meyer (born 1981), politician (CDU)
- Ulrich Pinner (born 1954), tennis player
- Georg-Wilhelm Postel (1896–1953), World War II general
- Christian Gottlieb Priber (1697–1744), utopian colonist
- Heinz Richter (born 1947), cyclist
- Werner Richter (1893–1944), General in World War II
- Marco Rudolph (born 1970), boxer
- René Sommerfeldt (born 1974), cross-country skier
- Lisa Tetzner (1894–1963), children's author
- Steffen Tölzer (born 1985), ice hockey player
- Christian Weise (1642–1708), writer, dramatist, poet, pedagogue and librarian
- Dieter-Gerhardt Worm (born 1930), conductor
- Albert Zimmermann (1808–1888), painter
- Max Zimmermann (1811–1878), painter
- Robert Zimmermann (1815–1864), painter
- Richard Zimmermann (1820–1875), painter
- Chval of Zittau (born and died in the 13th century), nobleman from the Ronovci family and the founder of the family of the Lords of Lipá.

=== Honorary citizens ===
- Martin Mutschmann, 1933 (revoked during German Reunification in 1990, along with other high-ranking Nazi officials in line with "Article VIII, Section II of Allied Control Council Directive No. 38 of 1946")
- Gerhard Gebauer, granted in 2010

== Sources ==
- Miller, Michael (2017). Gauleiter Volume 2. California: R James Bender Publishing. ISBN 978-1-932970-32-6.
- Köhler, Gustav (1846). Der Bund der Sechsstädte in der Ober-Lausitz: Eine Jubelschrift (in German). Görlitz: G. Heinze & Comp.
