= Richard Zimmermann =

German painter

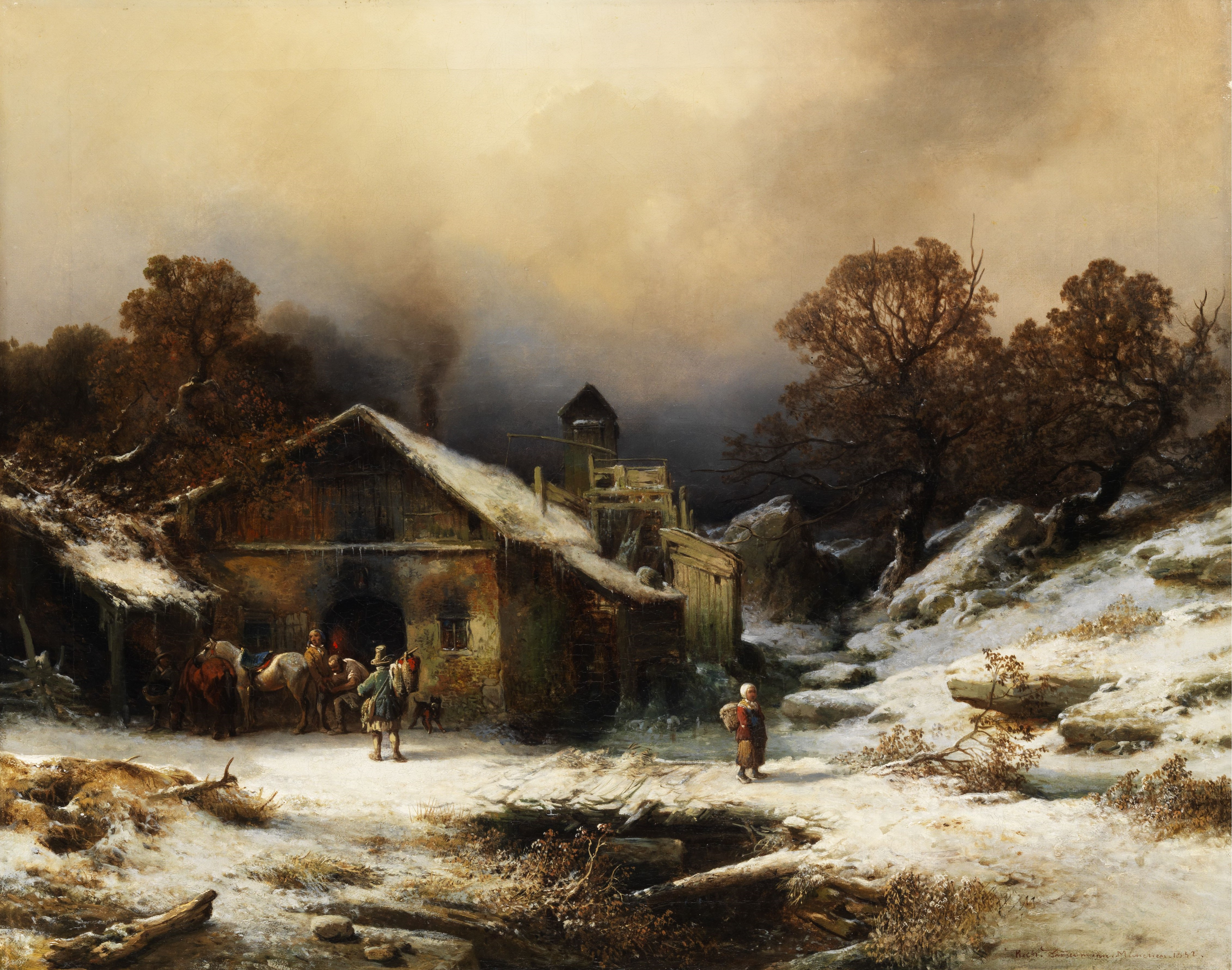
Snowy Landscape with Farmhouse (1852)

Richard Augustus Zimmermann (1820–1875) was a German genre and landscape painter.

== Biography ==
Zimmermann was born in Zittau. He was the son of the impresario Karl Friedrich August Zimmermann, and his three brothers, Albert, Max, and Robert, have all been well-known painters. He was a pupil of the first, and in 1838 followed him to Munich, devoting himself, in opposition to his advice, to landscape painting instead of history. The change, however, proved successful, and his winter landscapes, forest and mountain views, village sketches, and sea pieces became popular. In his later period he adopted the style of Berchem. He retired for a time to Prague, where he worked for a goldsmith. He died after a short illness in 1875.
