= Christian Gottlieb Priber =

- Born: March 21, 1697; Zittau, Germany
- Died: 1744 (aged 46–47); Frederica, Georgia

Christian Gottlieb Priber (March 21, 1697 – 1744) was a German immigrant with legal training who immigrated to the British Colonies of North America with a vision of establishing a utopian commonwealth among Cherokee and other Native Americans living in what later became the Southeastern United States. Viewed by the Cherokee as a "beloved man", Priber fell afoul of the ruling British for his vision against the envisioned commonwealth holding private property, and his support for their providing sanctuary to runaway slaves and debtors. After the colonial authorities demanded his surrender, British-allied Creeks captured him in 1743. He died during his imprisonment by the British in Frederica, Georgia.

== Early life and education ==
Christian Gottlieb Priber was born on March 21, 1697, in Zittau, Electorate of Saxony to Friedrich Priber, a linen merchant and beerhouse owner, and Anna Dorothea Bergmann. Priber studied law at Erfurt University where, in October 1722, he published his dissertation: The Use of the Study of Roman Law and the Ignorance of that Law in the Public Life of Germany.

== Utopian activity in America ==
Priber's activity in America involved the Cherokee people, who, at the time, occupied a powerful position in southeastern colonial America. The Cherokee accepted Priber as a "beloved man" because of his affection for Native American culture and his opposition to, as he viewed it, a thoroughly corrupt European culture.

Priber sought the Cherokee out in particular, because he viewed them as an ideal people to actualize his utopian vision. Working in their community, he advocated a communal society, the idea of which he based on Plato's Republic; he envisioned that a united confederation made up of all the native tribes in the region could play off the different colonial powers, Spain, France, and England, and strengthen their hold on tribal land.

Priber opposed private property and supported refuge for runaway slaves and debtors in Cherokee territory as part his utopian vision. His surrender was demanded by the British authorities in 1739. The British-allied Creeks captured him en route to New Orleans in 1743, and he was handed over to the British colonial authorities and imprisoned in Frederica, Georgia.

== Personal life ==
Priber wed Christiane Dorothea Hoffmann, the daughter of a merchant, printer, and Senator, in November 1722. They had five children.

Priber died in 1744 during his imprisonment, in Frederica, Georgia.
