= Kreuzkirche, Zittau =

Coordinates: 50.897897°N 14.811025°E

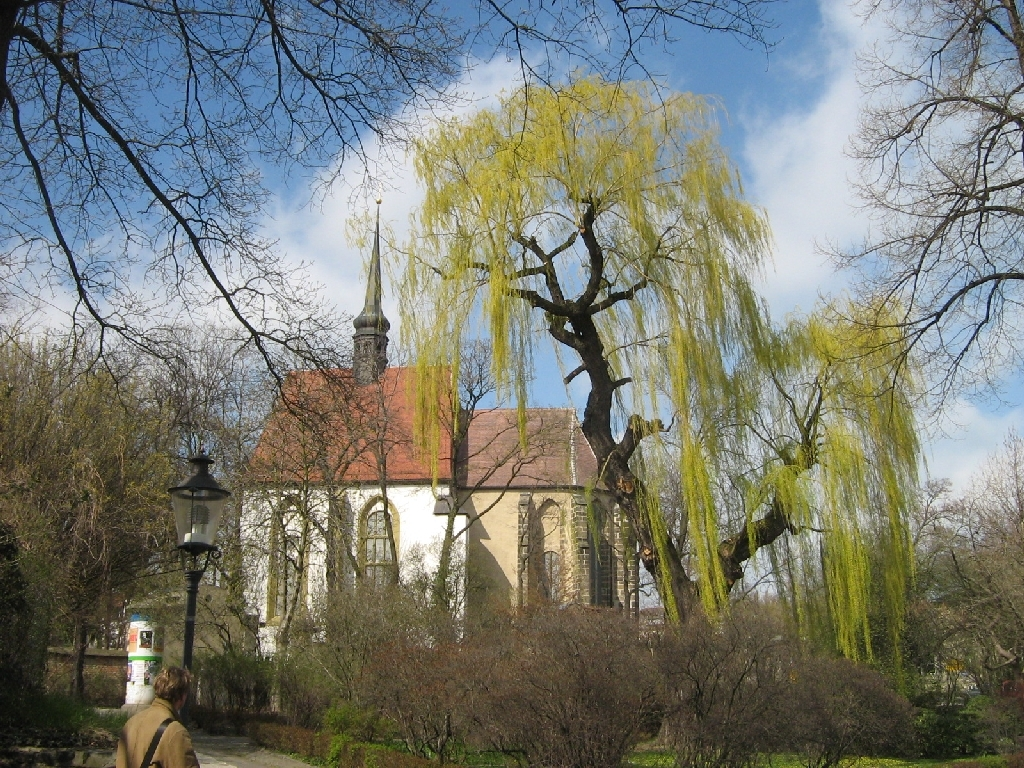
Kreuzkirche in Zittau

The Kreuzkirche Zittau is a former church in Zittau, Saxony, Germany. The Gothic hall church, which has an unusual architecture, was used for funerals. It is now a museum, dedicated primarily to the presentation of a medieval textile, the Großes Zittauer Fastentuch.

== History ==
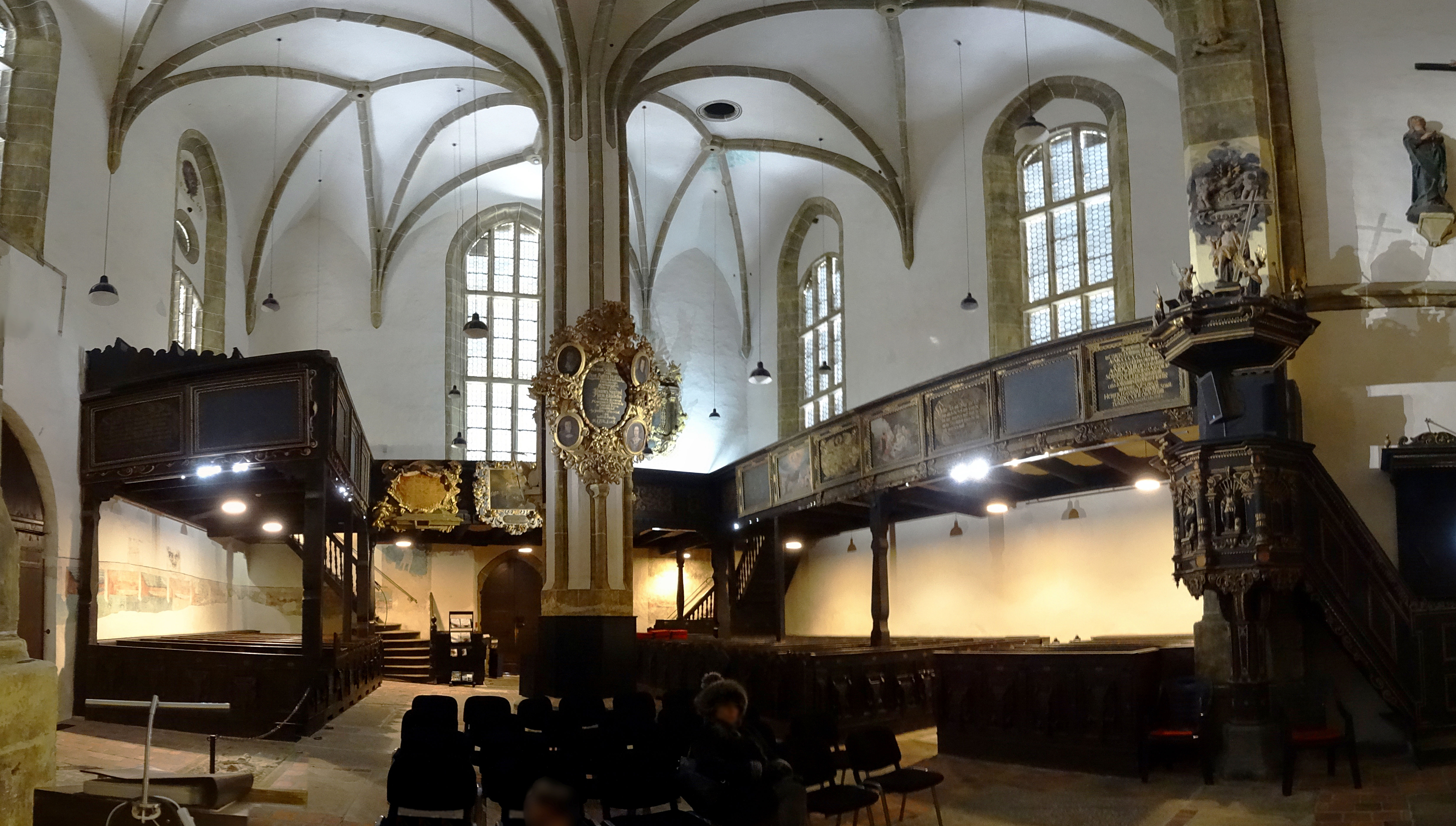
Interior

The church was built at end of the 14th century as a Gothic hall with one column, following the model of the Church of Our Lady on the Lawn in Prague. It was probably dedicated in 1410. It was used for funerals. It was damaged by fire in 1643 and restored from 1651 to 1654, with a simpler exterior. The church was secularised in 1972 and subsequently neglected. It was restored again from 1986.

The church is used as a museum, presenting the medieval Großes Zittauer Fastentuch, a textile artwork from 1472. It belonged to the Johanniskirche in Zittau and is among the most notable extant medieval textiles. It has been exhibited since 1999 in the largest vitrine of any museum.

== Literature ==
- Barbara Bechter, Wiebke Fastenrath et al. (eds.): Dehio-Handbuch der Deutschen Kunstdenkmäler, Sachsen I, Regierungsbezirk Dresden. Deutscher Kunstverlag, Munich / Berlin 1996, ISBN 3-422-03043-3, pp. 874–876.
- Friedrich and Helga Möbius: Sakrale Baukunst. Union Verlag, Berlin 1958, p. 229.
