= Kreuzkirche am Ölrain =

German church

Coordinates: 47°29′51″N 9°44′14″E

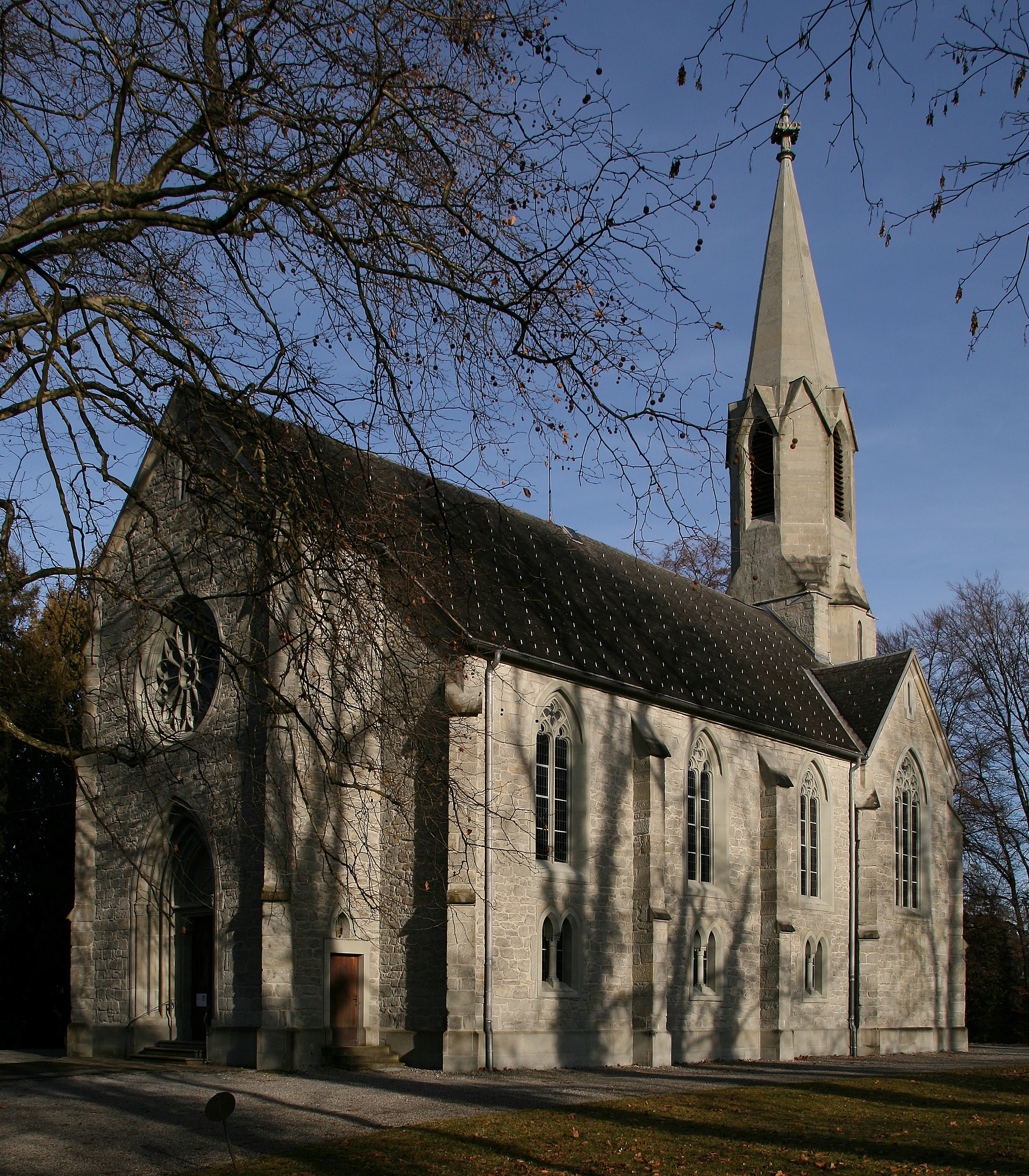
Kreuzkirche am Ölrain

The Kreuzkirche am Ölrain is a German Reformed Church of the town Bregenz and is located on the site of a former Roman settlement.

The church building was constructed from 1862 to 1864 according to the plans of the architect Christian Friedrich von Leins from Stuttgart in Gothic Revival architecture style. In 1904, the church was also the first electrically lit and heated church in the k.u.k. monarchy.

The nave - with an integrated transept under a gable roof and a choir tower - is surrounded by a cemetery to the north. The hall room has an open timber roof truss and a wooden gallery. In the choir, on the right is a war memorial to the First World War with a crucifix made of stone by Albert Bechtold from 1923.

The organ from 1981 was built by Rieger Orgelbau.
