= 1st Czechoslovak Army Corps in the Soviet Union =

1st Czechoslovak Army Corps První československý armádní sbor Prvý československý armádny zbor
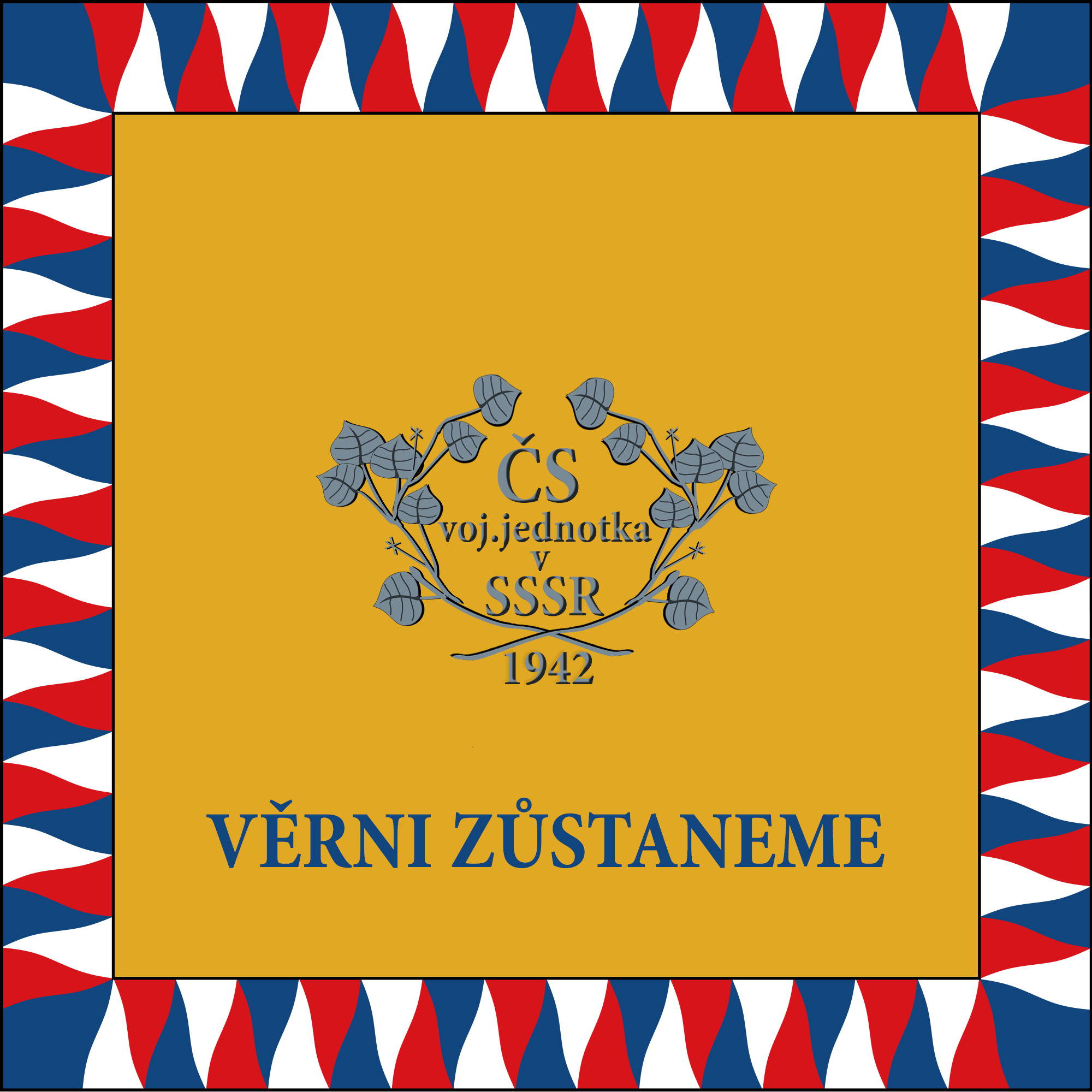
- Banner of the 1st Czechoslovak Army Corps
- Active: 5 May 1944–15 May 1945
- Country: Czechoslovakia; Soviet Union
- Allegiance: Czechoslovak government-in-exile
- Branch: Red Army
- Type: Corps
- Size: 16,171 (September 1944)
- Part of: 1st Ukrainian Front, later 4th Ukrainian Front
- Mottos: "Věrni zůstaneme" Loyal We Will Remain
- Engagements: World War II; Eastern Front; Dnieper–Carpathian Offensive; Battle of the Dukla Pass; Western Carpathian offensive; Moravia–Ostrava offensive; Prague Offensive
- Commander: Jan Kratochvíl (1944); Ludvík Svoboda (1944–1945); Karel Klapálek (1945)

The 1st Czechoslovak Army Corps (Czech: První československý armádní sbor, Slovak: Prvý československý armádny zbor), also known as Svoboda's Army (Czech: Svobodova armáda, after its commander Ludvík Svoboda), was a military formation of the Czechoslovak Army in exile fighting on the Eastern Front alongside the Soviet Red Army in World War II.

The corps was the largest of the Czechoslovak units that fought on the Soviet side on the Eastern Front.

== History of Czechoslovak military in the USSR ==
The 1st Czechoslovak Independent Field Battalion, formed in Buzuluk in the Urals, was the first foreign unit fighting alongside the Red Army in Soviet Union. It was formed from former members of the Czechoslovak Legion, Czechoslovak citizens (mostly refugees) living in the Soviet Union, Slovak prisoners-of-war and defectors, and Volhynian Czechs (Soviet citizens of Czech origin). Lieutenant-colonel Ludvík Svoboda was appointed to become the commander of the unit on 15 July 1942.

Despite the plans of the Czechoslovak government-in-exile in the United Kingdom, who intended to keep the unit intact to help with the future liberation of the Czechoslovakia, the officers of the battalion tried to bring the unit into the fight as soon as possible. After sending a personal letter to Joseph Stalin, they eventually succeeded and the battalion was sent into action. Notably, it took part in the defensive battle of Sokolovo, a part of the larger Third Battle of Kharkov, in March 1943. At the time, it was one of the most well armed infantry battalions on the East Front – fully equipped with automatic guns and semiautomatic infantry weapons. However, the battalion lacked heavier anti-tank weapons and artillery, which was to be provided by supporting Soviet units. Because of this, during the battle, when facing parts of the German armored division, the battalion suffered heavy losses and was later withdrawn from the front line.

In May 1943, the remnants of the 1st Czechoslovak Independent Field Battalion and the 1st Czechoslovak Reserve Regiment were reorganized into 1st Czechoslovak Independent Brigade. The reinforcements were largely Rusyn and Ukrainian prisoners released from the Gulag camps. The brigade played a key role in the 1943 battle of Kiev, and its troops were some of the first to reach the center of the Ukrainian capital city. The brigade suffered only low losses: 33 dead and missing, 82 wounded. At the time the brigade had a strength of 3,348 personnel.

== Formation ==
Large parts of the Ukrainian Soviet Socialist Republic had been liberated by 1943 and 1944, allowing the Czechoslovak units to recruit Volhynian Czechs who were technically Soviet citizens. Around 12,000 enlisted, becoming the core of the post-war Czechoslovak Army. At the same time, thousands of Slovak prisoners of war, captured or deserted from Slovak Army, were regrouped and trained as the new parachute unit. This enabled to build the army corps.

The corps was created on April 10, 1944, at Chernivtsi and his headquarters moved to Sadagura. The 1st Czechoslovak Army Corps consisted of three (later four) infantry brigades and of tank, artillery, engineer and other support units. Some of these units were later reorganized into higher independent units, such as Tank Brigade and Mixed Air Division. While most of the Czechoslovak units served as part of the Corps, some may have been detached for operations with Red Army formations and units as required.

In late autumn 1944, when parts of Czechoslovakia (Ruthenia and eastern Slovakia) were already liberated, a new infantry brigade was formed and the support units transformed into higher units.

== Combat history ==
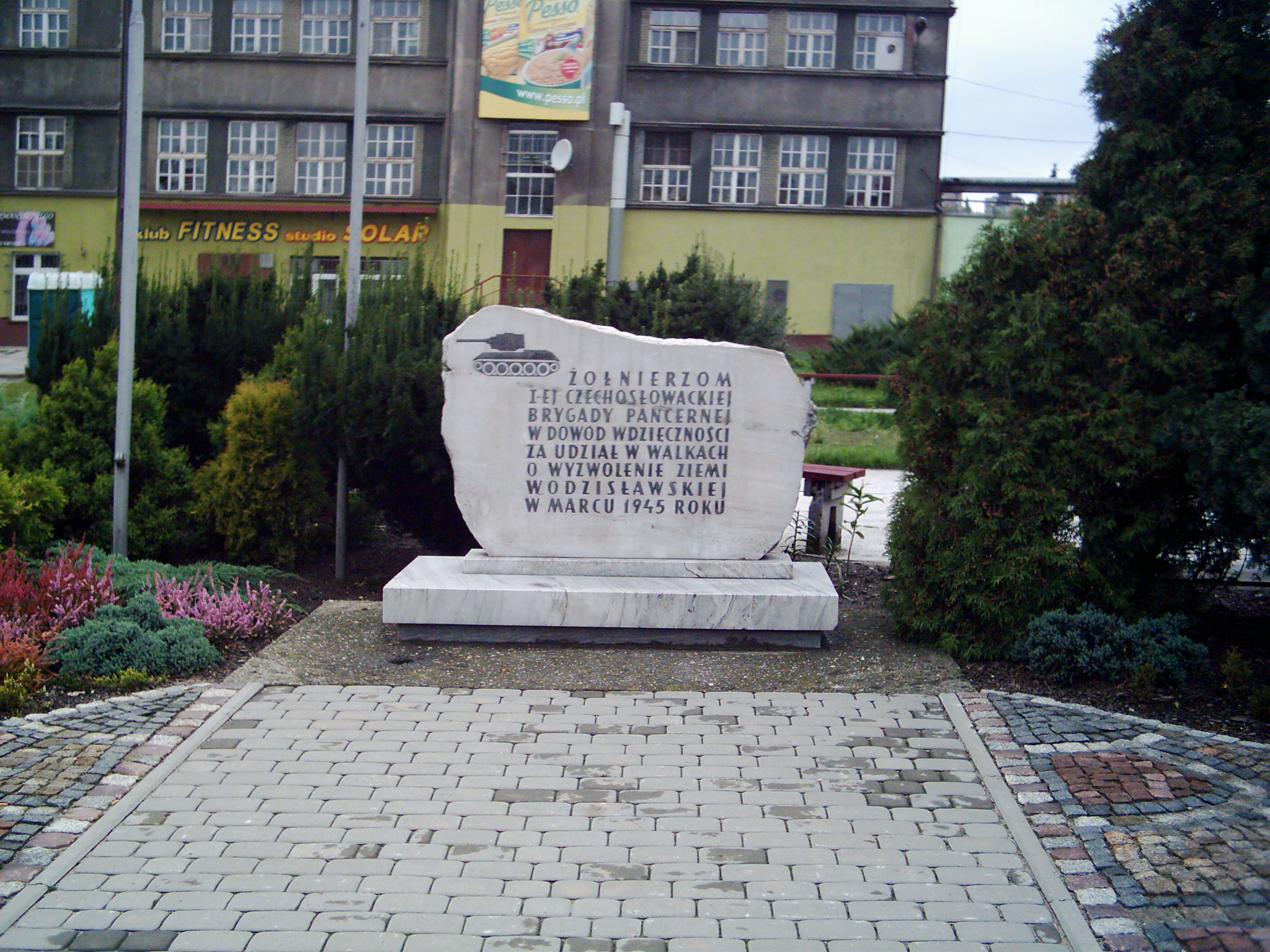
Monument to 1st Czechoslovak Tank Brigade in Wodzisław (Silesia, Poland)

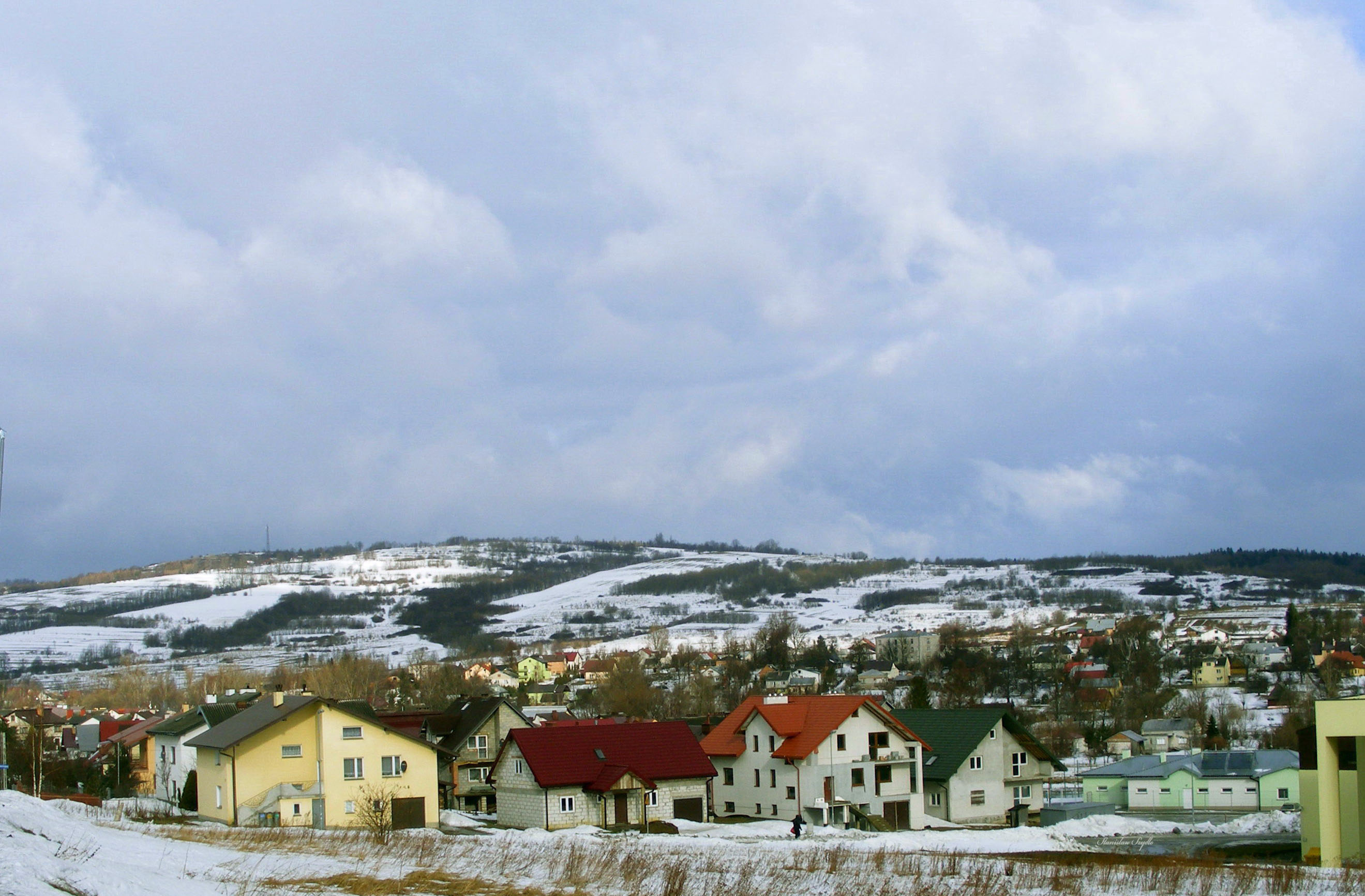
Dukla Hill 534

By the time that the Soviet offensive entered Czechoslovakia, it had grown to corps size. In the autumn of 1944, 13,000 members of the corps participated in the Battle of Dukla Pass, and after fierce fighting they finally set foot on their native soil once more. Czechoslovak troops were also involved in the Prague Offensive, the last major World War II battle in Europe.

The Corps initially served within the 1st Ukrainian Front's 38th Army.

From September 4, 1944, as the part of 38th Army the Corps participated in the East Carpathian Strategic Offensive Operation (8–28 September 1944). During this operation, from 14,900 personnel the Corps suffered a loss of 1,630 dead and 4,069 wounded. While majority of the Corps fought in the Dukla Pass, the 2nd Parachute Brigade and the 1st Czechoslovak Independent Fighter Air Regiment were relocated behind the enemy lines as the direct support to the Slovak National Uprising. After the Uprising was suppressed, the Fighter Regiment was withdrawn, while the soldiers of 2nd Parachute Brigade continued in partisan warfare in Slovak mountains until the battlefront came to central Slovakia.

In November 1944 Corps was reassigned to 4th Ukrainian Front's, 1st Guards Army, only the artillery units saw the action within the 1st Ukrainian Front's in the Soviet offensive near Jasło. As part of 4th Ukrainian Front, 18th Army the Corps took part in the secondary battles until the end of the war and participated in the liberation of central Slovakia and east Moravia. However the 1st Tank Brigade, 1st Czechoslovak Mixed Air Division and some infantry units were reassigned again to the 1st Ukrainian Front's 38th Army and fought in the hardest fights in the Moravian-Ostrava Operation. At the end of the war the remnants of the Tank Brigade formed so called Fast Group in the Prague Strategic Offensive Operation (6–11 May 1945) during which the Corps suffered 112 killed, and 421 wounded from a total of 48,400 personnel.

The First Czechoslovak Army Corps ceased to exist shortly after the victorious end of the war. On 25 May 1945, the provisional organization of the Czechoslovak armed forces was approved, according to which there was a reorganization of the Czechoslovak army in peacetime. Since the end of the May 1945 the Corps was reorganized into the 1st Czechoslovak Army and its brigades were reorganized into respective divisions.

== Commanders ==
- Jan Kratochvíl (18. 5 – 10. 9. 1944)
- Ludvík Svoboda (10. 9. 1944 – 3. 4. 1945)
- Bohumil Boček – acting commander (8. 3 – 6. 4. 1945)
- Karel Klapálek (4. 4 – 15. 5. 1945)

The Corps's initial commander was Brigade General Jan Kratochvíl, who was replaced by Brigade General Ludvík Svoboda during the initial phase of Battle of Dukla Pass. The decision was made by Soviet authorities (Marshal Konev) but was subsequently confirmed by Czechoslovak government in London. Towards the end of the war Svoboda became Minister of Defence in the new government appointed in Košice and was replaced by Brigade General Karel Klapálek who however was recovering from injuries at the time and was therefore substituted by general Boček.

== Organisation ==
The Corps composition on formation was:

- 1st Czechoslovak Independent Brigade (original unit, formed prior the Corps, in May 1943), commander in 1945: brigadegeneral Jan Satorie, later brigadegeneral Oldřich Španiel
  - 1st Infantry Battalion, commander in 1945: staff captain Ľudovít Takáč, later captain Evžen Surovčík
  - 2nd Infantry Battalion, commander in 1945: staff captain Václav Čeřenský, later lieutenant colonel František Voves
  - 3rd Infantry Battalion, commander in 1945: lieutenant colonel Štefan Želinský, later captain Jaroslav Svoboda
  - 1st Battalion of Submachine Gunners, commander in 1945: staff cpt. J. Novák, later cpt. F. Felcman
  - 1st Artillery Regiment, commander in 1945: staff cpt. Ľ. Stein, later major L. Štalmášek
  - 2nd Artillery Regiment, commander in 1945: staff cpt. Vilém Štajner
- 2nd Czechoslovak Parachute Brigade (formed in January 1944), commander: brigadegeneral Vladimír Přikryl
  - 10th Infantry Battalion, commander in 1945: 1st Lt. V. Vavrinčík
  - 11th Infantry Battalion, commander in 1945: major O. Záhora
  - 12th Infantry Battalion, commander in 1945: cpt. J. Syrovátka
  - 4th Battalion of Submachine gunners, commander in 1945: 1st Lt. K. Vítek, later staff cpt. J. Čambalík
  - 8th Artillery Regiment, commander in 1945: staff cpt. J. Pazderka
  - 9th Artillery Regiment, commander in 1945: cpt. J. Foršt, mjr. K. Šíma
- 3rd Czechoslovak Independent Brigade (formed in June 1944), commander: lieutenant colonel Jaroslav Selner
  - 4th Infantry Battalion, commander in 1945: captain Ladislav Svátek
  - 5th Infantry Battalion, commander in 1945: major A. Hak, later mjr L. Peroutka
  - 6th Infantry Battalion, commander in 1945: major František Moravec
  - 2nd Battalion of Submachine gunners, commander in 1945: cpt. O. Šacher
  - 3rd Artillery Regiment, commander in 1945: staff cpt. V. Formánek
  - 4th Artillery Regiment, commander in 1945: staff cpt. B. Hlavatý
- 4th Czechoslovak Independent Brigade (formed in February 1945), commander: colonel Pavol Kuna
  - 7th Infantry Battalion, commander: cpt. P. Kováč, later staff cpt. T. Galba
  - 8th Infantry Battalion, commander: cpt. J. Lipový, later staff cpt. Š. Margitan
  - 9th Infantry Battalion, commander: major V. Střelka
  - 3rd Battalion of Submachine gunners, commander: cpt. M. Čordáš
  - 7th Artillery Regiment, commander: lieutenant colonel J. Svoboda
- 1st Czechoslovak Independent Tank Brigade (formed in August 1944), commander in 1945: major Vladimír Janko
  - 1st Tank Battalion, commander in 1945: 1st Lt. Imrich Gaš
  - 2nd Tank Battalion, commander in 1945: cpt. Josef Buršík
  - 3rd Tank Battalion, commander in 1945: cpt. Emanuel Šrámek
  - Motorized Battalion of Submachine Gunners, commander in 1945: 1st Lt. Sergej Petras
- 1st Czechoslovak Independent Engineering Battalion
- 2nd Czechoslovak Paratrooper Brigade

Air units operationally attached to the Corps were:

- 1st Czechoslovak Mixed Air Division

== See also ==
- Marie Ljalková
- Otakar Jaroš
- Vasil Timkovič
- Polish Armed Forces in the East
- Anders' Army – a Polish formation

== Sources ==
- Czechoslovak military units in USSR (1942–1945) by Michal Gelbič
- Russia and USSR in the wars of 20th century: Losses of combat forces, a statistical investigation, under general editorialship of professor, General-Colonel G.F. Krivosheyev, Moscow, Olma-Press, 2001
