= Otakar Jaroš =

Czech soldier

- Born: 1 August 1912; Louny, Bohemia, Austria-Hungary
- Died: 8 March 1943 (aged 30); Sokolovo, Reichskommissariat Ukraine
- Military career
- Service years: 1937–39 and 1942–43
- Rank: Lieutenant (1937–39; Czechoslovak Army); First Lieutenant (1942–43; First Czechoslovak independent field battalion); Captain (posthumous)
- Commands: Commander of signal platoon in Prešov (1937–39), Commander of the First Company, First Czechoslovak independent field battalion (1942–43)
- Conflicts: Second World War; Eastern Front; Third Battle of Kharkov; Battle of Sokolovo †
- Awards: Hero of the Soviet Union

Otakar Jaroš (Czech pronunciation: [ˈotakar ˈjaroʃ]; 1 August 1912 – 8 March 1943) was a Czech officer in the Czechoslovak forces in the Soviet Union. He was killed in the Battle of Sokolovo and became the first member of a foreign army decorated with the highest Soviet decoration, Hero of the Soviet Union.

== Early life ==
Otakar Jaroš was born in Louny, Bohemia (Austria-Hungary, today the Czech Republic) into the family of a Czech railway engineer. When he was nine months old, his father was transferred to Mělník and the family followed him. Jaroš spent his childhood in Mělník and joined the Sokol and Scout organisations. These two organisations formed his physical skills and later fighting spirit.

== Military career ==
Following Czech independence in 1918, Jaroš studied in grammar school, but he left and attended high school in electrotechnics. After graduation, he was drafted and served his basic military service in the 3rd Signals Brigade in Trnava. He attended the non-commissioned officers school for a year and finished as a corporal. Jaroš went on to attend the school for reserve officers in Turnov. Following the advice of his uncle, Colonel František Konopásek, Jaroš entered the military academy in Hranice. On 29 August 1937 he was appointed to the rank of sub-lieutenant. He served as the commander of a signals platoon in Prešov for a year.

== Life in the Protectorate ==
After the 1938 Munich Agreement, Czechoslovakia was disunited. Jaroš returned to Mělník where the municipal office asked him to be the chief of police, which he refused. Instead, he worked for the post office in Náchod.

Germans are here, I would have to work against them and that would not end well.

— Otakar Jaroš when refusing job of police chief.

== World War II ==
Jaroš did not accept the German occupation of Czechoslovakia, and in the summer of 1939 he escaped to Poland where he joined the Czechoslovak Legion in Kraków under the command of Lieutenant Colonel Ludvík Svoboda. When Poland was defeated by the Nazis and its eastern parts were occupied by the Soviet Union, the legion fell into Soviet captivity on 17 September.

In the Soviet internment, Jaroš led the signals platoon and also the officer's school. In January 1940 he began serving as the radio operator of the Czechoslovak military mission in Moscow. After the German assault on the Soviet Union, the situation changed radically. With the rank of lieutenant since October 1941, Jaroš, together with other Czech officers, became a constituent member of the First Czechoslovak Independent Field Battalion in Buzuluk in 1942. He was made First Lieutenant and was in command of 1st Company (7 February 1942).

== Death ==
During a German counteroffensive in February 1943, the Czechoslovak battalion was ordered to defend the frozen river in the vicinity of Kharkov. Jaroš's strengthened 1st Company took position in front of the river in the village of Sokolovo; the rest of the battalion and supporting Soviet units stayed behind the river. On the afternoon of 8 March, German armored troops with at least 14 tanks launched two attacks on Sokolovo. In the ensuing battle, 1st Company was almost annihilated, and Jaroš was killed. Fighters of his company destroyed about 19 tanks and 6 APCs. They were ordered to remain until reinforcements could arrive, but the supporting tanks could not cross the thawing river (the battalion's commander had neglected to take into account the terrain). It wasn't until late that night that the remnants of 1st Company were ordered to retreat. Any further defense of Sokolovo had lost any value, as the unfrozen river no longer provided an avenue for the Germans to advance.

Jaroš himself was wounded twice during battle, and was killed while attempting to destroy a German tank: he approached the tank with a sheaf of grenades and was hit by the tank's machine-gunner. However, he was already close enough, and the tank was destroyed in wake of the grenades' explosion.

== Decorations ==
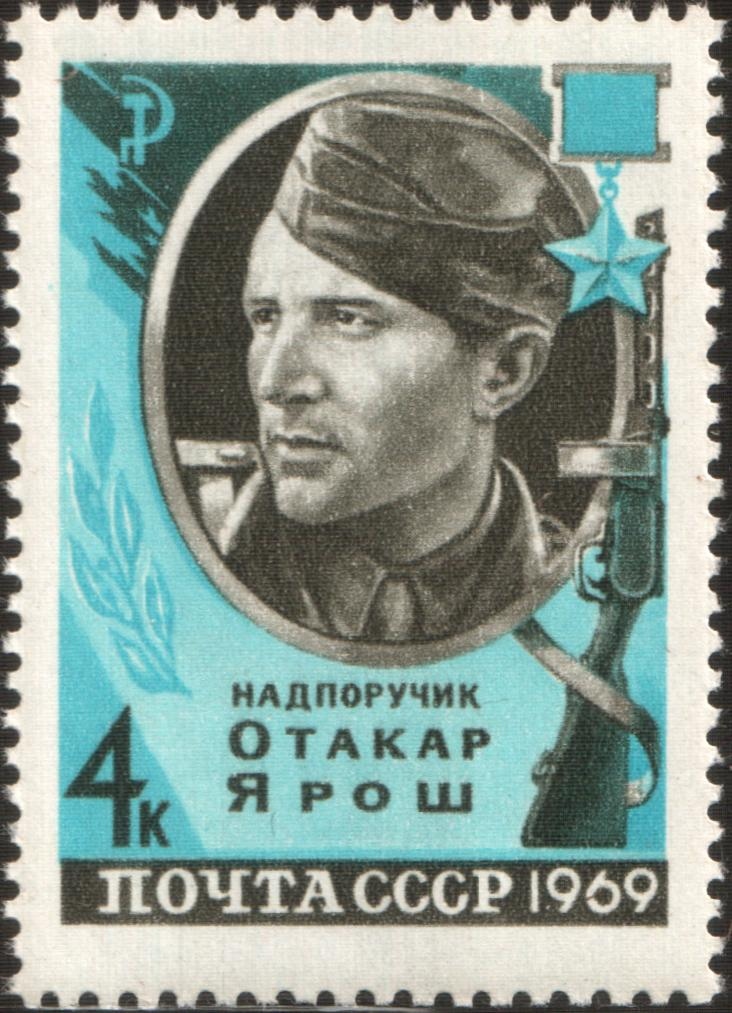
Otakar Jaroš on a 1969 postage stamp of the USSR

For his heroism Otakar Jaroš was posthumously promoted to captain, and on 17 April 1943 he was decorated with the Gold Star of the Hero of the Soviet Union, the first member of a foreign army to be so honoured.

Otakar Jaroš received a few decorations issued by the Soviet and Czech Communist parties. He became an icon for the communist propaganda even though he was an anti-communist and he did not even try to make it any secret.

Other decorations:

- Military Order of the White Lion 1st class (1948)
- Československý válečný kříž 1939 (Czechoslovak Military Cross), 13 March 1943
- Order of Lenin, 17 April 1943
- Sokolovská pamětní medaile (Commemorative medal of Sokolovo), 8.3.1948

== Honoring ==
One of the streets in Kharkov was named after Otakar Jaroš to memorialize his deed.

The Embankment of Captain Jaroš (nábřeží Kapitána Jaroše) along the Vltava River in Prague (and its eponymous tram stop) also has been named in his honor since 1948.

A primary school in the town of Trutnov is named after Otakar Jaroš "Základní škola kapitána Jaroše".

== See also ==
- Richard Tesařík
