= 1st Czechoslovak Mixed Air Division =

1st Czechoslovak Composite Air Division
- 1. československá smíšená letecká divize
- Active: 1944–1945
- Country: Czechoslovakia
- Role: Air Forces
- Size: Air Wing
- Part of: 1st Czechoslovak Army Corps in USSR; 8th Air Army of USSR - operational control
- Engagements: liberation of Ostrava
- Flying hours: 264

Commanders
- Commander: Lt.Col Ludvík Budík

Aircraft flown
- Attack: Ilyushin Il-2
- Fighter: Lavochkin La-5, Lavochkin La-7

The 1st Czechoslovak Composite Air Division (Czech: 1. československá smíšená letecká divize; Slovak: 1. česko-slovenská zmiešaná letecká divízia) was the air arm of the Czechoslovak armed forces in the Soviet Union during World War II, operating under the operational command of the Soviet Air Force. It existed during 1944 and 1945, being merged into the Czechoslovak Air Force upon the cessation of hostilities.

== History ==
The 1st Czechoslovak Composite Air Division was created in January 1945 from the already battle-experienced 1st Czechoslovak Fighter Air Regiment commanded by Staff Captain František Fajtl with most of its pilots previously transferred from the Czechoslovak units of RAF.

=== Slovak National Uprising ===
The 1st Regiment flew from the Zolná u Zvolena Airfield, and later Tri Duby Airfield in Slovakia during the Slovak National Uprising, the newly created 2nd Fighter Air Regiment based on the Combined Squadron of the Slovak Air Force that was able to escape together with Fajtl's forces to the Red Army controlled Territory and the Attack Air Regiment that used the Iljushin Il-2 Shturmovik aircraft. The reorganisation and training of the new pilots took a long time and the 8th Soviet Air Army Command decided to deploy the combat ready units of the Division, the 1st Fighter Air Regiment and the 3rd Atack Air Regiment in April 1945.

They flew air support missions during the operation to liberate Ostrava and Opava. The 2nd Fighter Regiment was at that time still training with the new Lavochkin La-7 airplanes and was not able to flew combat missions yet. The pilots wanted to flew to help the Prague Uprising but the command did not allow it as the Prague was at the limit of the range for the La-5NF aircraft from their base at Poreba airfield in Poland.

=== Post-WWII ===
After the end of the WWII, the unit was transferred to the Prague Airports and with the transformation of the Czechoslovak military to the peacetime organisation it was renamed the 4th Air Division and later operated from airfield in Slovakia.

== Structure ==
- 1st Czechoslovak Fighter Aviation Regiment (La 5NF)
- 2nd Czechoslovak Fighter Air Regiment (La 7)
- 3rd Czechoslovak Atack Air Regiment (Il-2)

== Aircraft ==
- Ilyushin Il-2
- Lavochkin La-5NF
- Lavochkin La-7
- Polikarpov Po-2
