= Zoe Klusáková-Svobodová =

Czech academic and translator (1925–2022)

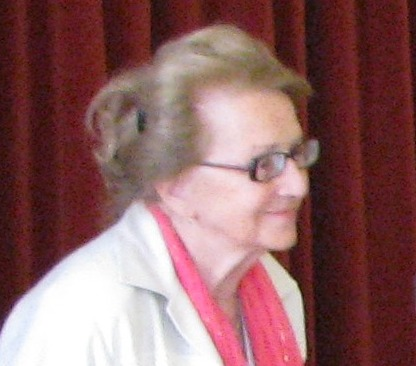
- Klusáková-Svobodová in 2009
- Born: Zoe Klusáková; 4 December 1925; Uzhhorod, Czechoslovakia (now Ukraine)
- Died: 12 December 2022 (aged 97)
- Education: Czech Technical University in Prague
- Occupations: Economist; academic; translator
- Spouse: Milan Klusák (m. 1949; died 1992)
- Children: Luďa Klusáková
- Parents: Ludvík Svoboda; Irena Svobodová
- Awards: State Defense Cross

Zoe Klusáková-Svobodová (4 December 1925 – 12 December 2022) was a Czech economist, academic, writer and translator. She was the daughter of Ludvík Svoboda, the President of Czechoslovakia from 1968 to 1975, and the widow of Czechoslovak diplomat, Milan Klusák.

== Early life ==
Klusáková-Svobodová was born in the city of Uzhhorod, Czechoslovakia (now Ukraine), on 4 December 1925. She was the youngest of two children, including her older brother, Miroslav. Her father, Ludvík Svoboda, was a general who would later become President of Czechoslovakia during the Communist era from 1968 to 1975. Her mother, Irena Svobodová (née Stratilová), became the First Lady of Czechoslovakia.

== World War II ==
Her father, General Ludvík Svoboda, went into exile during the Occupation of Czechoslovakia (1938–1945) by Nazi Germany and the outbreak of World War II, while Zoe Klusáková-Svobodová remained in occupied Czechoslovakia with her mother and brother. The entire family joined the Czechoslovak resistance to Nazi occupation, specifically aiding Czechoslovak and foreign paratroopers who landed near Dřínov. However, the family and the larger resistance cell were discovered by the Gestapo, forcing Klusáková-Svobodová to flee into hiding in the Bohemian-Moravian Highlands of southern Moravia from 1941 until the end of occupation in 1945. She and her mother first lived in hiding in the village of Hroznatín before moving to Džbánice for the remainder of the war. Her brother, Miroslav, was captured by the Nazis and died in the Mauthausen concentration camp in Austria.

== Career ==
Klusáková-Svobodová became an economist and a notable Czech-Russian translator. She taught at the Faculty of Law at Charles University in Prague. She also devoted considerable effort to preserving the legacy of her parents, Ludvík Svoboda and Irena Svobodová, including as honorary chairwoman of the Ludvík Svoboda Society.

Klusáková-Svobodová accounts of World War II and her involvement with the Czech resistance are archived in the Memory of Nations, an oral history initiative created by Post Bellum, a Czech nonprofit.

== Personal life and death ==
Her daughter, Czech historian Luďa Klusáková, died in 2020.

She died on 12 December 2022.

== Awards and recognitions ==
- State Defense Cross (2009) - Awarded by the Ministry of Defence.
- Jubilee Medal "60 Years of Victory in the Great Patriotic War 1941–1945" (2005, Russia)
