= Order of Klement Gottwald =

Order of Klement Gottwald Řád Klementa Gottwalda
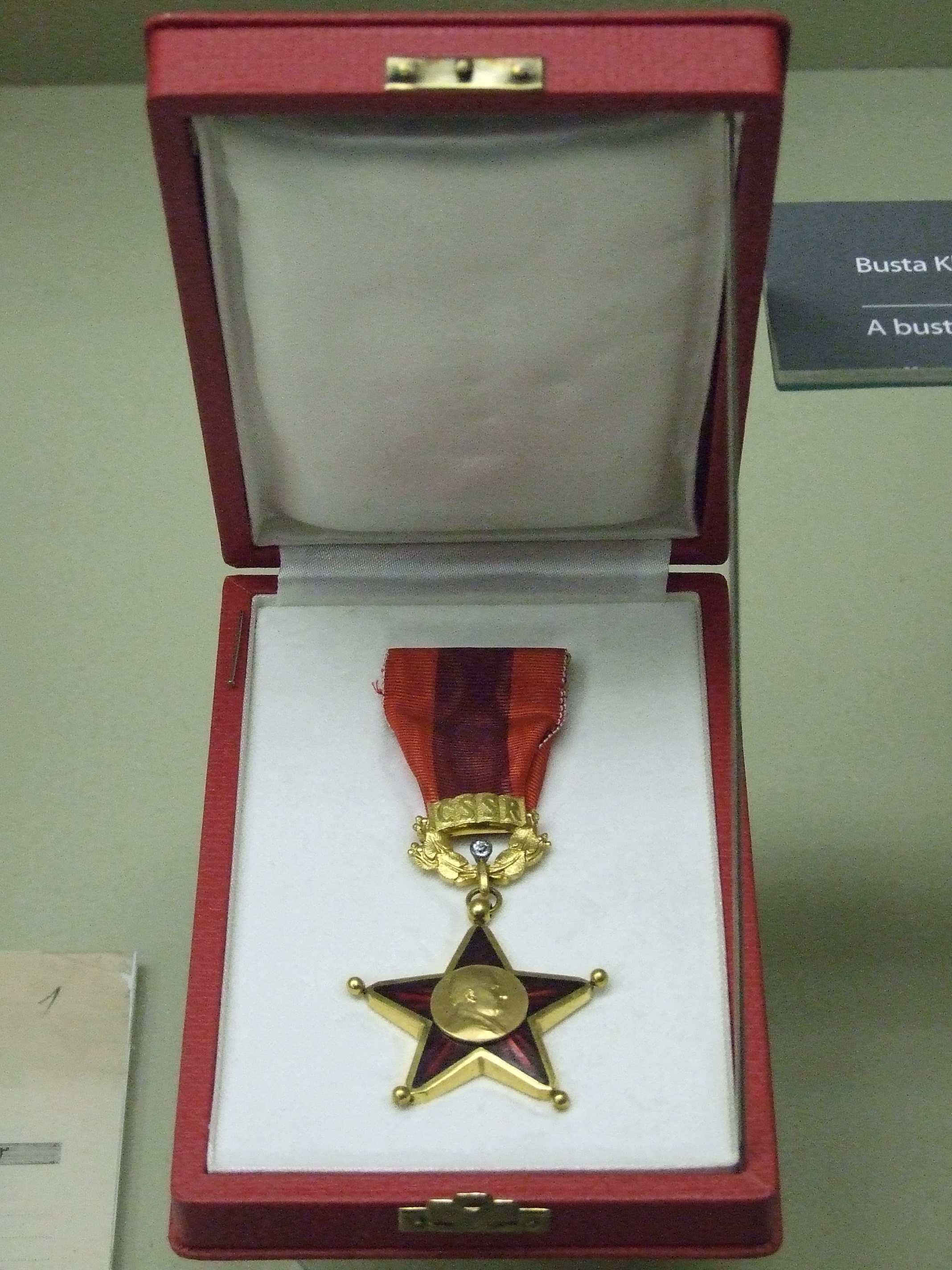
- Order of Klement Gottwald
- Type: State Order
- Awarded for: Outstanding merit for realisation of the socialism system in Czechoslovakia
- Country: Czechoslovak Socialist Republic
- Presented by: the President of Czechoslovakia
- Status: No longer awarded
- Established: February 1953; Renamed 1955
- Final award: 1989
- Ribbon of the order

Precedence
- Next (higher): Gold Star of the Hero of the Socialist Labour
- Next (lower): Order of Socialism

The Order of Klement Gottwald (Czech: Řád Klementa Gottwalda; Slovak: Rad Klementa Gottwalda) was established by the Czechoslovak government in February 1953. The original name of the Order was "Order of building of socialist homeland". The name of the Order was changed to "Order of Klement Gottwald - for building of socialist homeland" in 1955.

The Order was awarded for outstanding merit for realisation of the socialism system in Czechoslovakia obtained during the building of the state or during the battle on political, economic, social or cultural field, during increase of defense ability of the state or during battle with inside enemy.

The Order of Klement Gottwald was awarded by the President of the Republic. The awarded person received a certificate and booklet.

The star of the Order is made from gold, the obverse is red enameled. The arms of the stars have small gold beads on the end. The diameter of the star without the beads is 45 mm. In the middle of the star obverse was (i) golden medallion with the small state symbol (original type) or (ii) a gold medallion with the portrait of the first communist Czechoslovak president Klement Gottwald. On the obverse is a similar medallion with plastic sash and inscription"Za socialistickou vlast" (=for the socialist homeland) and two laurel leaves. The suspension is made from gold and consists of a strip with the abbreviation "ČSR" (types until 1960) or "ČSSR" (type after 1960) and from lime palms connected with a clasp.

== Recipients ==
- Jambyn Batmönkh
- Vasiľ Biľak
- Leonid Brezhnev
- Fidel Castro
- Alexej Čepička
- Konstantin Chernenko
- Luis Corvalán
- Václav David
- Martin Dzúr
- Yuri Gagarin
- Andrei Grechko
- Georgy Grechko
- Aleksei Gubarev
- Gustáv Husák
- Miloš Jakeš
- Wojciech Jaruzelski
- Kim Il-sung
- Ivan Konev
- Dmitry Lelyushenko
- Vasily Margelov
- Kirill Moskalenko
- Antonín Novotný
- Phạm Văn Đồng
- Vladimír Remek
- Yuri Romanenko
- Yevgeny Savitsky
- Viliam Široký
- Sergei Sokolov
- Souphanouvong
- Ludvík Svoboda
- Valentina Tereshkova
- Nikolai Tikhonov
- Trường Chinh
- Todor Zhivkov
- Dmitry Ustinov
- Ivan Yakubovsky
- Andrey Yeryomenko
- Matvei Zakharov
