= Vasil Timkovič =

Czechoslovak veteran of World War II (1923–2023)

Vasil Timkovič (21 March 1923 – 2 January 2023) was a Czechoslovak veteran of World War II, who fought for the 1st Czechoslovak Army Corps in the Soviet Union in the Battle of Kiev and the Battle of the Dukla Pass. He was one of the last living witnesses of the fighting on the Eastern Front.

== Biography ==
Timkovič was born in 1923 in the village of Skotarskoje in Carpathian Ruthenia (then part of Czechoslovakia).

Before joining the army, Timkovič survived a gulag. He was a veteran of the Liberation of Czechoslovakia in 1945.

Timkovič died on 2 January 2023, aged 99, and was buried on 13 January 2023 with military honours in Česká Třebová.
