= Third Battle of Kharkov =

1943 series of battles on the Eastern Front of World War II

- Part of the Eastern Front of World War II
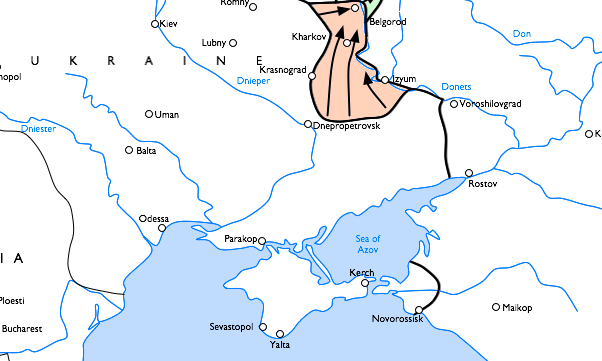
- German counteroffensives on the Eastern Front, February–March 1943
Date	19 February – 15 March 1943 (3 weeks and 3 days)
Location	Kharkov, Ukrainian SSR, Soviet Union 49°58′0″N 36°19′0″E
Result	German victory

Belligerents
Soviet Union; Czechoslovakia (Note: The 1st Czechoslovak Independent Field Battalion, formed by the Czechoslovak government in London, participated in the fighting at Sokolovo in March 1943. Although small-scale, the engagement assumed substantial political importance in Communist Czechoslovakia in the post-war years.)	Germany

Commanders and leaders
(Soviet Union) Filipp Golikov; (Soviet Union) Nikolay Vatutin; (Soviet Union) Konstantin Rokossovsky; (Soviet Union) Markian Popov; (Soviet Union) Vasily Koptsov †	(Nazi Germany) Erich von Manstein; (Nazi Germany) Paul Hausser; (Nazi Germany) Hermann Hoth; (Nazi Germany) Eberhard von Mackensen; (Nazi Germany) Theodor Eicke †

Units involved
(Soviet Union) Central Front: 1st Guards Army; 3rd Tank Army; 6th Army; 40th Army; 70th Army; 1st Guards Cavalry Corps; (Soviet Union) 16th Air Army	(Nazi Germany) 4th Panzer Army: II SS Panzer Corps; XLVIII Panzer Corps; (Nazi Germany) 1st Panzer Army: XXIV Panzer Corps; XXX Army Corps; XXXX Army Corps; LVII Army Corps; (Nazi Germany) 4th Air Fleet (Nazi Germany) 6th Air Fleet

Strength
210,000 c. 59 tanks	120,000–130,000 men 350 tanks

Casualties and losses
45,219 killed or missing 41,250 wounded Total: 86,469 casualties	4,500 killed or missing 7,000 wounded Total: 11,500 casualties (SS Panzer Corps only)

The Third Battle of Kharkiv was a series of battles on the Eastern Front of World War II, undertaken by Nazi Germany's Army Group South against the Soviet Red Army, around the city of Kharkiv from 19 February to 15 March 1943. Known to the German side as the Donets Campaign and in the Soviet Union as the Donbass and Kharkiv operations, the German counterstrike led to the recapture of the cities of Kharkiv and Belgorod.

As the German 6th Army was encircled in the Battle of Stalingrad, the Red Army undertook a series of wider attacks against the rest of Army Group South. These culminated on 2 January 1943, when the Red Army launched Operation Star and Operation Gallop, which between January and early February broke German defenses and led to the Soviet recapture of Kharkiv, Belgorod, Kursk as well as Voroshilovgrad and Izium. These victories caused participating Soviet units to over-extend themselves. Following the destruction of the German Sixth Army at Stalingrad, Soviet formations under Konstantin Rokossovsky were reorganized and redeployed to form the Central Front, which began a new offensive on 25 February 1943. Months of continuous operations had taken a heavy toll on the Soviet forces and some divisions were reduced to 1,000–2,000 combat-effective soldiers. On 19 February, Field Marshal Erich von Manstein launched his Kharkiv counterstrike, using the fresh II SS Panzer Corps and two panzer armies.

The Wehrmacht flanked, encircled, and defeated the Red Army's armored spearheads south of Kharkiv. This enabled Manstein to renew his offensive against the city of Kharkiv proper on 7 March. Despite orders to encircle Kharkiv from the north, the SS Panzer Corps instead decided to directly engage Kharkiv on 11 March. This led to four days of house-to-house fighting before Kharkiv was recaptured by the SS Division Leibstandarte on 15 March. The German forces recaptured Belgorod two days later, creating the salient, which in July 1943 would lead to the Battle of Kursk. The German offensive cost the Red Army an estimated 90,000 casualties. The house-to-house fighting in Kharkiv was also particularly bloody for the German SS Panzer Corps, which had suffered approximately 4,300 men killed and wounded by the time operations ended in mid-March.

== Background ==
At the start of 1943, the German Wehrmacht faced a crisis as Soviet forces encircled and reduced the German 6th Army in the Battle of Stalingrad and expanded their Winter Campaign towards the Don River. On 2 February 1943 the 6th Army's commanding officers surrendered, and an estimated 90,000 men were taken prisoner by the Red Army. Total German losses at the Battle of Stalingrad, excluding prisoners, were between 120,000 and 150,000. Throughout 1942 German casualties totaled around 1.9 million personnel, and by the start of 1943 the Wehrmacht was around 470,000 men below full strength on the Eastern Front. At the beginning of Operation Barbarossa, the Wehrmacht was equipped with around 3,300 tanks; by 23 January only 495 tanks, mostly of older types, remained operational along the entire length of the Soviet–German front. As the forces of the Don Front were destroying the German forces in Stalingrad, the Red Army's command (Stavka) ordered the Soviet forces to conduct a new offensive, which encompassed the entire southern wing of the Soviet–German front from Voronezh to Rostov.

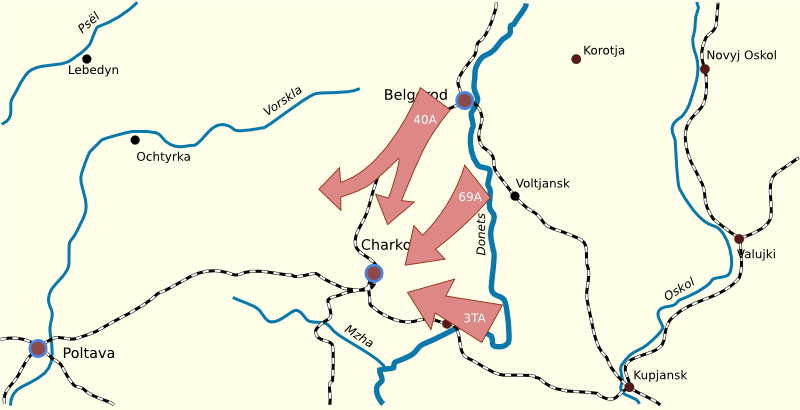
Operation Star, Soviet advances between 10 and 14 February 1943

On 2 February, the Red Army launched Operation Star, threatening the cities of Belgorod, Kharkiv and Kursk. A Soviet drive, spearheaded by four tank corps organized under Lieutenant-General Markian Popov, pierced the German front by crossing the Donets River and pressing into the German rear. On 15 February, two fresh Soviet tank corps threatened the city of Zaporizhia on the Dnieper River, which controlled the last major road to Rostov and housed the headquarters of Army Group South and Luftflotte 4 (Air Fleet Four). Despite Adolf Hitler's orders to hold the city, Kharkiv was abandoned by German forces and the city was recaptured by the Red Army on 16 February. Hitler immediately flew to Manstein's headquarters at Zaporizhia. Manstein informed him that an immediate counterattack on Kharkiv would be fruitless, but that he could successfully attack the overextended Soviet flank with his five Panzer corps, and recapture the city later. On 19 February Soviet armored units broke through the German lines and approached the city. In view of the worsening situation, Hitler gave Manstein operational freedom. When Hitler departed, the Soviet forces were only some 30 kilometers (19 mi) away from the airfield.

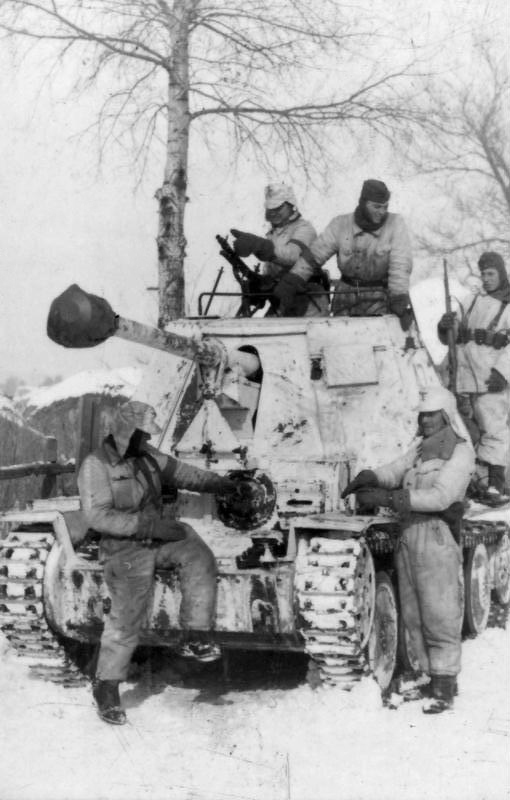
Troops of SS Division Leibstandarte near Kharkiv, February 1943

In late January and early February 1943, the Red Army launched two major offensives: Operation Gallop, initiated by the Southwestern Front on 29 January, and Operation Star, initiated by the Voronezh Front near Voronezh on 2 February. These operations achieved substantial territorial gains before the German counteroffensive.

The surrender of the German 6th Army at Stalingrad freed six Soviet armies, under the command of Konstantin Rokossovsky, which were refitted and reinforced by the 2nd Tank Army and the 70th Army. These forces were repositioned in the junction between German Army Groups Center and South. Known to the Soviet forces as the Kharkiv and Donbass operations, the offensive sought to surround and destroy German forces in the Orel salient, cross the Desna River and surround and destroy German Army Group Center. Originally planned to begin between 12 and 15 February, deployment problems forced Stavka to push the start date back to 25 February. Meanwhile, the Soviet 60th Army pushed the German Second Army's 4th Panzer Division away from Kursk, while the Soviet 13th Army forced the Second Panzer Army to turn on its flank. This opened a 60 kilometers (37 mi) breach between these two German forces, shortly to be exploited by Rokossovsky's offensive. While the Soviet 14th and 48th Armies attacked the Second Panzer Army's right flank, making minor gains, Rokossovsky launched his offensive on 25 February, breaking through German lines and threatening to surround and cut off the German Second Panzer Army and the Second Army, to the south. Unexpected German resistance began to slow the operation considerably, offering Rokossovsky only limited gains on the left flank of his attack and in the center. Elsewhere, the Soviet 2nd Tank Army had successfully penetrated 160 kilometers (99 mi) of the German rear, along the left flank of the Soviet offensive, increasing the length of the army's flank by an estimated 100 kilometers (62 mi).

While the Soviet offensive continued, Field Marshal von Manstein was able to put the SS Panzer Corps – now reinforced by the 3rd SS Panzer Division – under the command of the 4th Panzer Army, while Hitler agreed to release seven understrength panzer and motorized divisions for the impending counteroffensive. The 4th Air Fleet, under the command of Field Marshal Wolfram von Richthofen, was able to regroup and increase the number of daily sorties from an average of 350 in January to 1,000 in February, providing German forces strategic air superiority. On 20 February, the Red Army was perilously close to Zaporizhia, signaling the beginning of the German counterattack, known to the German forces as the Donets Campaign.

== Comparison of forces ==
Between 13 January and 3 March 1943, an estimated 502,400 personnel took part in what was known as the Voronezh–Kharkiv Offensive and approximately 153,561 casualties were suffered by the Red Army. German or Axis strength/casualty total alongside them.

Comparable German forces included German Army Group B, the Hungarian Second Army and Italian Eighth Army. There is no verified theater-matched total, with estimates of total casualties ranging from 160,000 to 321,000. The Hungarian Second Army and Italian Eighth Army suffered catastrophic losses during the operation.

=== German forces ===
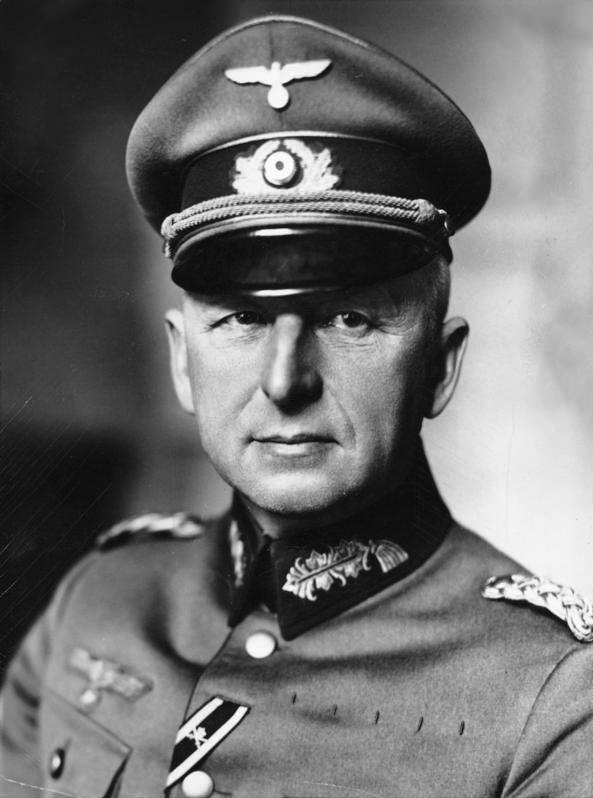
Field Marshal Erich von Manstein, commander of Army Group South at the time of the battle

At the time of the counterattack, Manstein could count on the 4th Panzer Army, composed of XLVIII Panzer Corps, the SS Panzer Corps and the First Panzer Army, with the XL and LVII Panzer Corps. The XLVIII Panzer Corps was composed of the 6th, 11th and 17th Panzer Divisions, while the SS Panzer Corps was organized with the 1st SS, 2nd SS and 3rd SS Panzer Division. In early February, the combined strength of the SS Panzer Corps was an estimated 20,000 soldiers. The 4th Panzer Army and the First Panzer Army were situated south of the Red Army's bulge into German lines, with the First Panzer Army to the east of the 4th Panzer Army. The SS Panzer Corps was deployed along the northern edge of the bulge, on the northern front of Army Group South.

The Germans were able to amass around 160,000 men against the 210,000 Red Army soldiers. The German Wehrmacht was understrength, especially after continuous operations between June 1942 and February 1943, to the point where Hitler appointed a committee made up of Field Marshal Wilhelm Keitel, Martin Bormann and Hans Lammers, to recruit 800,000 new able-bodied men – half of whom would come from "nonessential industries". The effects of this recruitment were not seen until around May 1943, when the German armed forces were at their highest strength since the beginning of the war, with 9.5 million personnel.

By the start of 1943 Germany's armored forces had sustained heavy casualties. It was unusual for a Panzer division to field more than 100 tanks, and most averaged only 70–80 serviceable tanks at any given time. After the fighting around Kharkiv, Heinz Guderian embarked on a program to bring Germany's mechanized forces up to strength. Despite his efforts, a German panzer division could only count on an estimated 10,000–11,000 personnel, out of an authorized strength of 13,000–17,000. Only by June did a panzer division begin to field between 100 and 130 tanks each. SS divisions were normally better equipped, with an estimated 150 tanks, a battalion of self-propelled assault guns and enough half-tracks to motorize most of its infantry and reconnaissance soldiers – and these had an authorized strength of an estimated 19,000 personnel. At this time, the bulk of Germany's armor was still composed of Panzer IIIs and Panzer IVs, although the SS Division Das Reich had been outfitted with a number of Tiger I tanks.

The 4th Panzer Army was commanded by General Hermann Hoth, while the First Panzer Army fell under the leadership of General Eberhard von Mackensen. The 6th, 11th and 17th Panzer Divisions were commanded by Generals Walther von Hünersdorff, Hermann Balck and Fridolin von Senger und Etterlin, respectively. The SS Panzer Corps was commanded by General Paul Hausser, who also had SS Division Totenkopf under his command.

=== Red Army ===
Since the beginning of the Red Army's exploitation of Germany's Army Group South's defenses in late January and early February, the fronts involved included the Bryansk, Voronezh and Southwestern Fronts. These were under the command of Generals M. A. Reiter, Filipp Golikov and Nikolai Vatutin, respectively. On 25 February, Marshal Rokossovsky's Central Front also joined the battle. These were positioned in such a way that Reiter's Bryansk Front was on the northern flank of Army Group South, while Voronezh was directly opposite of Kursk, and the Southwestern Front was located opposite their opponents. Central Front was deployed between the Briansk and Voronezh Fronts, to exploit the success of both of these Soviet units, which had created a gap in the defenses of the German Second Panzer Army. This involved an estimated 500,000 soldiers, while around 346,000 personnel were involved in the defense of Kharkiv after the beginning of the German counterstroke.

Like their German counterparts, Soviet divisions were also seriously understrength. For example, divisions in the 40th Army averaged 3,500–4,000 men each, while the 69th Army fielded some divisions which could only count on 1,000–1,500 soldiers. Some divisions had as little as 20–50 mortars to provide fire support. This shortage in manpower and equipment led Vatutin's Southwestern Front to request over 19,000 soldiers and 300 tanks, while it was noted that the Voronezh Front had only received 1,600 replacements since the beginning of operations in 1943. By the time Manstein launched his counteroffensive, the Voronezh Front had lost so much manpower and had overextended itself to the point where it could no longer offer assistance to the Southwestern Front, south of it. The 1st Czechoslovak Independent Field Battalion, commanded by Ludvík Svoboda, participated in the defense of the approaches to Kharkiv. On 8–9 March 1943, its soldiers fought German forces at Sokolovo along the Mzha River, sustaining significant casualties before withdrawing.

== Manstein's counterattack ==
What was known to the Germans as the Donets Campaign took place between 19 February and 15 March 1943. Originally, Manstein foresaw a three-stage offensive. The first stage encompassed the destruction of the Soviet spearheads, which had over-extended themselves through their offensive. The second stage included the recapture of Kharkiv, while the third stage was designed to attack the Soviet forces at Kursk, in conjunction with Army Group Center – this final stage was ultimately called off due to the advent of the Soviet spring thaw (Rasputitsa) and Army Group Center's reluctance to participate.

=== First stage: 19 February – 6 March ===
On 19 February, Hausser's SS Panzer Corps was ordered to strike southwards, to provide a screen for the 4th Panzer Army's attack. Simultaneously, Army Detachment Hollidt was ordered to contain the continuing Soviet efforts to break through German lines. The 1st Panzer Army was ordered to drive north in an attempt to cut off and destroy Popov's Mobile Group, using accurate intelligence on Soviet strength which allowed the Wehrmacht to pick and choose their engagements and bring about tactical numerical superiority. The 1st and 4th Panzer Armies were also ordered to attack the overextended Soviet 6th Army and 1st Guards Army. Between 20 and 23 February, the 1st SS Division Leibstandarte SS Adolf Hitler (LSSAH) cut through the 6th Army's flank, eliminating the Soviet threat to the Dnieper River and successfully surrounding and destroying a number of Red Army units south of the Samara River. The SS Division Das Reich advanced in a northeastern direction, while the SS Division Totenkopf was put into action on 22 February, advancing parallel to Das Reich. These two divisions successfully cut the supply lines to the Soviet spearheads. First Panzer Army was able to surround and pocket Popov's Mobile Group by 24 February, although a sizable contingent of Soviet troops managed to escape north. On 22 February, alarmed by the success of the German counterattack, the Soviet Stavka ordered the Voronezh Front to shift the 3rd Tank Army and 69th Army south, in an effort to alleviate pressure on the Southwestern Front and destroy German forces in the Krasnograd area.

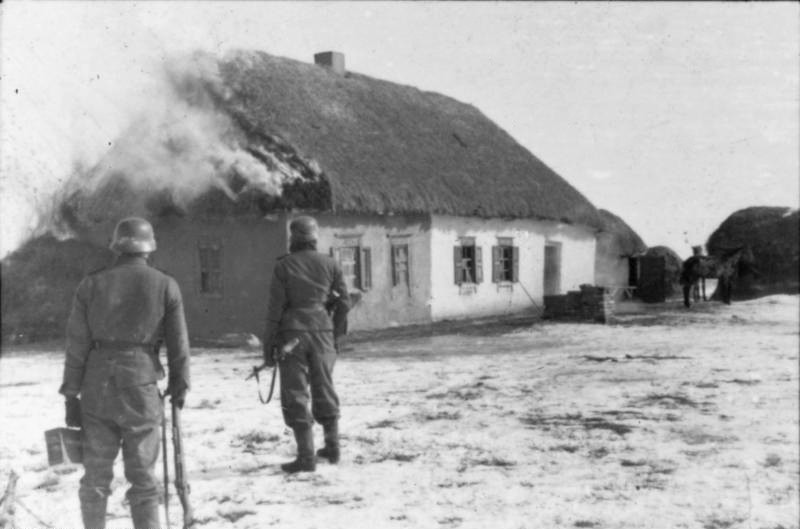
Waffen-SS men near a burning house, Kharkiv, February 1943

The Red Army's 3rd Tank Army began to engage German units south of Kharkiv, performing a holding action while Manstein's offensive continued. By 24 February, the Wehrmacht had pulled the Großdeutschland Division off the line, leaving the 167th and 320th infantry divisions, a regiment from the Totenkopf division and elements from the Leibstandarte division to defend the Western edge of the bulge created by the Soviet offensive. Between 24 and 27 February, the 3rd Tank Army and 69th Army continued to attack this portion of the German line, but without much success. With supporting Soviet units stretched thin, the attack began to falter. On 25 February, Rokossovsky's Central Front launched their offensive between the German Second and 2nd Panzer Armies, with encouraging results along the German flanks, but struggling to keep the same pace in the center of the attack. As the offensive progressed, the attack on the German right flank also began to stagnate in the face of increased resistance, while the attack on the left began to over-extend itself.

In the face of German success against the Southwestern Front, including attempts by the Soviet 6th Army breaking out of the encirclement, Stavka ordered the Voronezh Front to relinquish control of the 3rd Tank Army to the Southwestern Front. To ease the transition, the 3rd Tank Army gave two rifle divisions to the 69th Army and attacked south in a bid to destroy the SS Panzer Corps. Low on fuel and ammunition after the march south, the 3rd Tank Army's offensive was postponed until 3 March. The 3rd Tank Army was harassed and severely damaged by continuous German aerial attacks by Junkers Ju 87 Stuka dive bombers. Launching its offensive on 3 March, the 3rd Tank Army's 15th Tank Corps struck at advancing units of the 3rd SS Panzer Division and immediately went on the defensive. Ultimately, the 3rd SS Panzer Division was able to pierce the 15th Tank Corps' lines and link up with other units of the same division advancing north, successfully encircling the Soviet tank corps. The 3rd Tank Army's 12th Tank Corps was also forced on the defensive immediately, after SS divisions Leibstandarte and Das Reich threatened to cut off the 3rd Tank Army's supply route. By 5 March, the attacking 3rd Tank Army had been badly mauled, with only a small number of men able to escape northwards, and was forced to erect a new defensive line.

The destruction of Popov's Mobile Group and the Soviet 6th Army during the early stages of the German counterattack created a large gap between Soviet lines. Taking advantage of uncoordinated and piecemeal Soviet attempts to plug this gap, Manstein ordered a continuation of the offensive towards Kharkiv. Between 1 and 5 March the 4th Panzer Army, including the SS Panzer Corps, covered 80 kilometers (50 mi) and positioned itself only about 16 kilometers (9.9 mi) south of Kharkiv. By 6 March, the SS Division Leibstandarte made a bridgehead over the Mosh River, opening the road to Kharkiv. The success of Manstein's counterattack forced Stavka to stop Rokossovsky's offensive.

=== Advance towards Kharkiv: 7–10 March ===
While Rokossovsky's Central Front continued its offensive against the German Second Army, which had by now been substantially reinforced with fresh divisions, the renewed German offensive towards Kharkiv took it by surprise. On 7 March, Manstein made the decision to press on towards Kharkiv, despite the coming of the spring thaw. Instead of attacking east of Kharkiv, Manstein decided to orient the attack towards the west of Kharkiv and then encircle it from the north. The Großdeutschland Panzergrenadier Division had also returned to the front, and threw its weight into the attack, threatening to split the 69th Army and the remnants of the 3rd Tank Army. Between 8–9 March, the SS Panzer Corps completed its drive north, splitting the 69th and 40th Soviet Armies, and on 9 March it turned east to complete its encirclement. Despite attempts by Stavka to curtail the German advance by throwing in the freshly released 19th Rifle Division and 186th Tank Brigade, the German drive continued.

On 9 March, the Soviet 40th Army counterattacked against the Großdeutschland Division in a final attempt to restore communications with the 3rd Tank Army. This counterattack was caught by the expansion of the German offensive towards Kharkiv on 10 March. That same day, the 4th Panzer Army issued orders to the SS Panzer Corps to take Kharkiv as soon as possible, prompting Hausser to order an immediate attack on the city by the three SS Panzer divisions. Das Reich would come from the West, LSSAH would attack from the north, and Totenkopf would provide a protective screen along the north and northwestern flanks. Despite attempts by General Hoth to order Hausser to stick to the original plan, the SS Panzer Corps commander decided to continue with his own plan of attack on the city, although Soviet defenses forced him to postpone the attack until the next day. Manstein issued an order to continue outflanking the city, although leaving room for a potential attack on Kharkiv if there was little Soviet resistance, but Hausser decided to disregard the order and continue with his own assault.

=== Fight for the city: 11–15 March ===
Early morning 11 March, the LSSAH launched a two-prong attack into northern Kharkiv. The 2nd Panzergrenadier Regiment, advancing from the Northwest, split up into two columns advancing towards northern Kharkiv on either side of the Belgorod-Kharkiv railroad. The 2nd Battalion, on the right side of the railroad, attacked the city's Severnyi Post district, meeting heavy resistance and advancing only to the Severnyi railway yard by the end of the day. On the opposite side of the railroad, the 1st Battalion struck at the district of Alexeyevka, meeting a T-34-led Soviet counterattack which drove part of the 1st Battalion back out of the city. Only with aerial and artillery support provided by Ju 87 Stuka dive bombers and StuG assault guns were the German infantry able to battle their way into the city. A flanking attack from the rear finally allowed the German forces to achieve a foothold in that area of the city. Simultaneously, the 1st SS Panzergrenadier Regiment, with armor attached from a separate unit, attacked down the main road from Belgorod, fighting an immediate counterattack produced over the Kharkiv's airport, coming on their left flank. Fighting their way past Soviet T-34s, this German contingent was able to lodge itself into Kharkiv's northern suburbs. From the northeast, another contingent of German infantry, armor and self-propelled guns attempted to take control of the road exits to the cities of Rogan and Chuhuiv. This attack penetrated deeper into Kharkiv, but low on fuel the armor was forced to entrench itself and turn to the defensive.

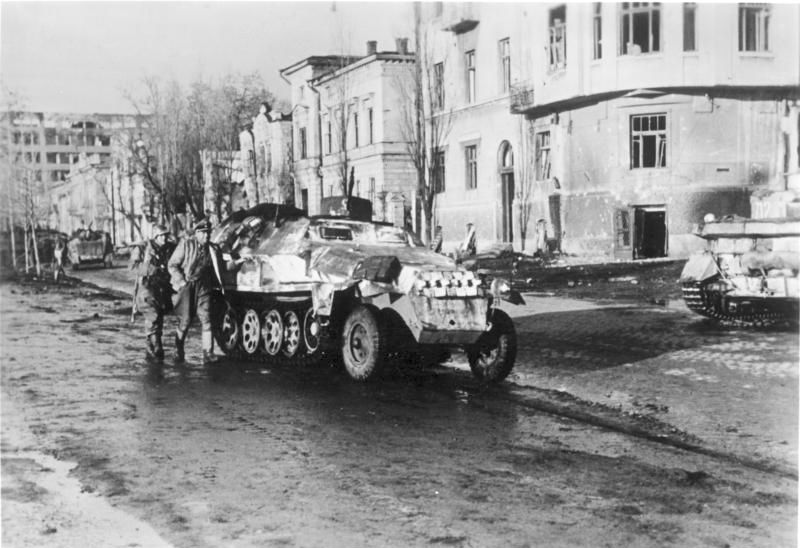
German armored personnel carrier on the Sumskaya street of Kharkiv, March 1943

Das Reich division attacked on the same day, along the west side of Kharkiv. After penetrating into the city's Zalyutino district, the advance was stopped by a deep anti-tank ditch, lined with Soviet defenders, including anti-tank guns. A Soviet counterattack was repulsed after a bloody firefight. A detachment of the division fought its way to the southern approaches of the city, cutting off the road to Merefa. At around 15:00, Hoth ordered Hausser to immediately disengage with SS Das Reich, and instead redeploy to cut off escaping Soviet troops. Instead, Hausser sent a detachment from SS Totenkopf division for this task and informed Hoth that the risk of disengaging with SS Das Reich was far too great. On the night of 11–12 March, a breakthrough element crossed the anti-tank ditch, taking the Soviet defenders by surprise, and opening a path for tanks to cross. This allowed Das Reich to advance to the city's main railway station, which would be the farthest this division would advance into the city. Hoth repeated his order at 00:15, on 12 March, and Hausser replied as he had replied on 11 March. A third attempt by Hoth was obeyed, and Das Reich disengaged, using a corridor opened by LSSAH to cross northern Kharkiv and redeploy east of the city.

On 12 March, the LSSAH made progress into the city's center, breaking through the staunch Soviet defenses in the northern suburbs and began a house-to-house fight towards the center. By the end of the day, the division had reached a position just two blocks north of Dzerzhinsky Square. The 2nd Panzergrenadier Regiment's 2nd Battalion was able to surround the square, after taking heavy casualties from Soviet snipers and other defenders, by evening. When taken, the square was renamed "Platz der Leibstandarte". That night, 2nd Panzergrenadier Regiment's 3rd Battalion, under the command of Joachim Peiper linked up with the 2nd Battalion in Dzerzhinsky Square and attacked southwards, crossing the Kharkiv River and creating a bridgehead, opening the road to Moscow Avenue. Meanwhile, the division's left wing reached the junction of the Volchansk and Chuhuiv exit roads and went on the defensive, fighting off a number of Soviet counterattacks.

The next day, the LSSAH struck southwards towards the Kharkiv River from Peiper's bridgehead, clearing Soviet resistance block by block. In a bid to trap the city's defenders in the center, the 1st Battalion of the 1st SS Panzergrenadier Regiment re-entered the city using the Volchansk exit road. At the same time, Peiper's forces were able to breakout south, suffering from bitter fighting against a tenacious Soviet defense, and link up with the division's left wing at the Volchansk and Chuhuiv road junction. Although the majority of Das Reich had, by now, disengaged from the city, a single Panzergrenadier Regiment remained to clear the southwestern corner of the city, eliminating resistance by the end of the day. This effectively put two-thirds of the city under German control.

Fighting in the city began to wind down on 14 March. The day was spent with the LSSAH clearing the remnants of Soviet resistance, pushing east along a broad front. By the end of the day, the entire city was declared to be back in German hands. Despite the declaration that the city had fallen, fighting continued over the next two days, as German units cleared the remnants of resistance in the tractor works factory complex, in the southern outskirts of the city.

== Aftermath ==
Army Group South's Donets Campaign had cost the Red Army over 80,000 personnel casualties. Of these troops lost, an estimated 45,200 were killed or went missing, while another 41,200 were wounded. (Note: This figure includes personnel losses between 19 February and 15 March 1943.) Between April and July 1943, the Red Army took its time to rebuild its forces in the area and prepare for an eventual renewal of the German offensive, known as the Battle of Kursk. Overall German casualties are more difficult to come by but clues are provided by examining the casualties of the SS Panzer Corps, taking into consideration that the Waffen-SS divisions were frequently deployed where the fighting was expected to be the harshest. By 17 March, it is estimated that the SS Panzer Corps had lost around 44% of its fighting strength, including around 160 officers and about 4,300 enlisted personnel.

As the SS Panzer Corps began to emerge from the city, they engaged Soviet units positioned directly southwest of the city, including the 17th NKVD Brigade, the 19th Rifle Division and the 25th Guards Rifle Division. Attempts by the Red Army to re-establish communication with the remnants of the 3rd Tank Army continued, although in vain. On 14 and 15 March, these forces were given permission to withdraw to the northern Donets River. The Soviet 40th and 69th Armies had been engaged since 13 March with the Großdeutschland Panzergrenadier Division, and had been split by the German drive. After the fall of Kharkiv, the Soviet defense of the Donets had collapsed, allowing Manstein's forces to drive to Belgorod on 17 March and take it by the next day. Muddy weather and exhaustion forced Manstein's counterstroke to end soon thereafter.

The military historian Bevin Alexander wrote that the Third Battle of Kharkiv was "the last great victory of German arms on the Eastern front", while the military historian Robert Citino referred to the operation as "not a victory at all". Borrowing from a chapter title of the book Manstein by Mungo Melvin, Citino described the battle as a "brief glimpse of victory". According to Citino, the Donets Campaign was a successful counteroffensive against an overextended and overconfident enemy and did not amount to a strategic victory.

Following the German success at Kharkiv, Hitler was presented with two options. The first, known as the "backhand method" was to wait for the inevitable renewal of the Soviet offensive and conduct another operation similar to that of Kharkiv – allowing the Red Army to take ground, extend itself and then counterattack and surround it. The second, or the "forehand method", encompassed a major German offensive by Army Groups South and Center against the protruding Kursk salient. Hitler favoured the "forehand method", which led to the Battle of Kursk.

== See also ==
- First Battle of Kharkiv (1941)
- Second Battle of Kharkiv (1942)
- Belgorod–Kharkiv offensive operation (August 1943)
