= Battle of Sokolovo =

1943 battle on the Eastern Front during World War Two

- Part of the Third Battle of Kharkov
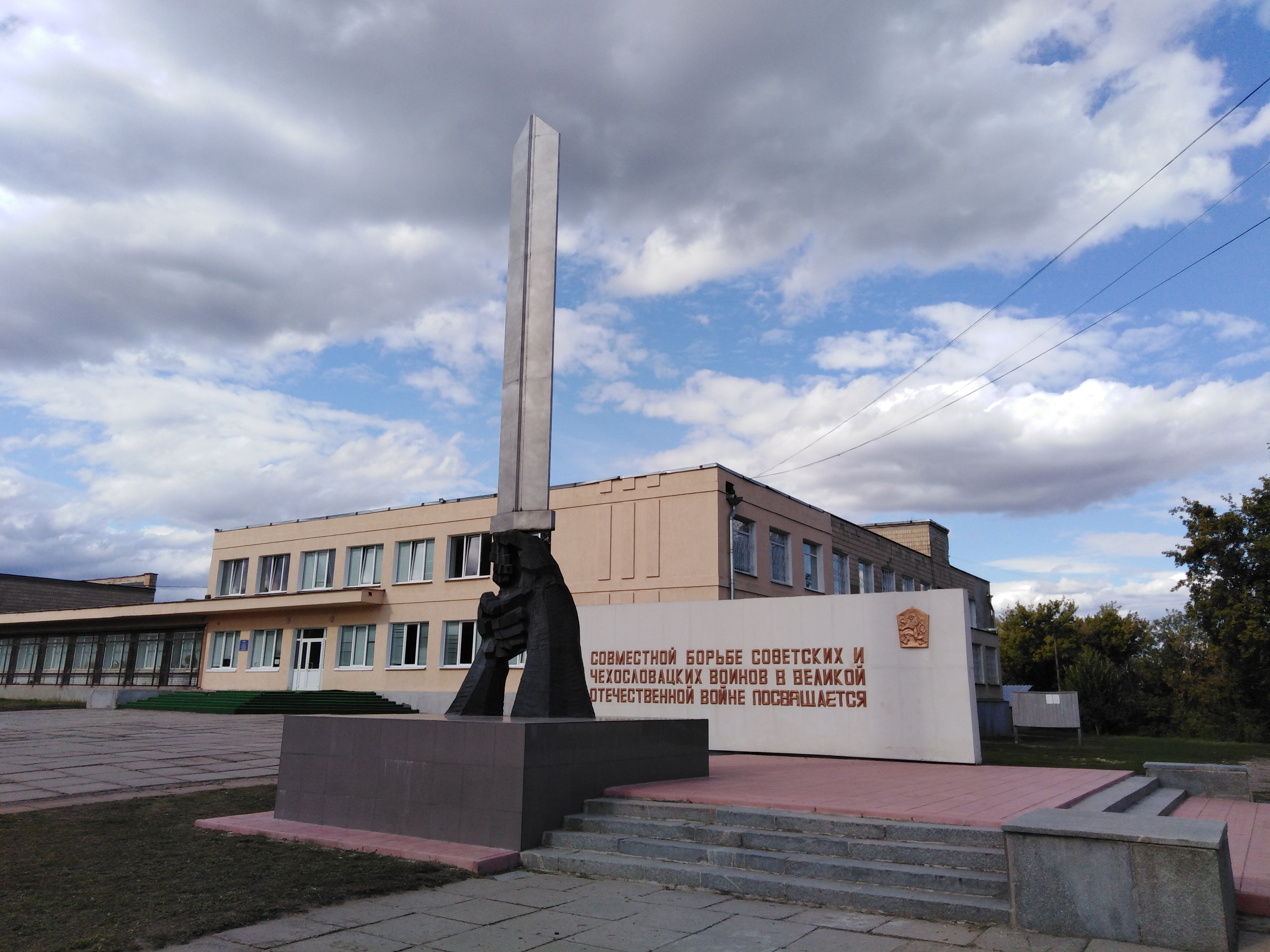
Date	8–9 March 1943
Location	Sokolovo, Ukrainian SSR, Soviet Union
Result	German advance slowed

Belligerents
Czechoslovakia; Soviet Union	(Nazi Germany) Germany

Commanders and leaders
(Czechoslovakia) Ludvík Svoboda	(Nazi Germany) Walther von Hünersdorff

Strength
350 soldiers 2 anti-tank cannons 16 anti-tank rifles	2,400 infantry 20–40 tanks 20 Armored vehicles

Casualties and losses
86 dead 20 POW or missing 114 injured 2 anti-tank cannons 7 anti-tank rifles	300–400 infantry 19 tanks 6 armored vehicles

The Battle of Sokolovo took place on 8 and 9 March 1943, near the village of Sokolovo (Ukrainian: Соколове, Sokolove) near Kharkiv in Ukraine when the ongoing attack of the Wehrmacht was delayed by joint Soviet and Czechoslovak forces. It was the first time that a foreign military unit, the First Czechoslovak Independent Field Battalion, fought together with the Red Army. Under the command of Ludvík Svoboda, later President of Czechoslovakia, the Czechoslovak soldiers delayed the advance of Germans to the Mzha River. On 13 March, the position was abandoned as untenable due to the complete German encirclement of Kharkiv.

== Prelude ==
Soldiers of the 1st Czechoslovak separate battalion was transported from the Buzuluk training camp to the Valuyki railway station, from where they set off on a 350-kilometer (220 mi) march to Kharkiv, since the railways were already completely destroyed. The march took place at night, as there was a threat of air raids by Luftwaffe aircraft during the day. The battalion reached Kharkiv, which had just been liberated, on March 1, 1943. Here the soldiers rested and on March 2, after midnight, they set off for the next march to the area of Sokolovo. There they received their first combat task – to maintain their position on the newly built defense line on the Mzha River. The approaches to Sokolovo were defended on the first line in the settlement of Taranovka by the Soviet 78th Guards Rifle Regiment, which fought against the enormous superiority of the Germans. And so Czechoslovak soldiers could prepare well for the upcoming attack and carry out fortification work. The problem was that the Mzha river was frozen, so it was not difficult for German tanks to get across it. The battalion commander Ludvík Svoboda therefore decided that one company would move in front of the Mzha river, where it would take up an advanced defensive position in the village of Sokolovo. The commander of the first company, first lieutenant Otakar Jaroš, volunteered for this task. The village was well fortified, two Soviet anti-tank guns were assigned to Jaroš to strengthen the defense. Other means of support were heavy artillery and rocket launchers, located behind the Mzha River, and ten Soviet T-34 tanks, which served as backup for the counterattack. From March 6, Czechoslovak reconnaissance units encountered Germans several times and shot several of them during firefights. It was a harbinger of a decisive attack.

== Battle ==
On March 8, 1943, at 11:00 a.m. German time, i.e. at about 1:00 p.m. Moscow time, the units of the 1st battalion of the tank grenadier regiment 4 and the motorcycle division 6 started their advance on Sokolovo. Strong defensive fire of the 1st Czechoslovak Army. however, the battalion from Sokolovo and the northern bank of the Mzha forced the attackers to stop the attack and retreat. The intensity of the defensive fire exceeded German expectations. Here is a discrepancy in the time of the attack, which Czech sources state at 1:30 p.m. and the claim that it was a combat reconnaissance, during which three tanks were to remain on the battlefield as an ambush and use smoke bombs to pretend destruction and focus on the Czechoslovak anti-tank weapons. Based on the testimony, it can definitely be ruled out that it was only reconnaissance by combat. Two hours later, the second attack began. The Germans already had the Sokolovo defense exposed and, after rearranging the troops, attacked from a different direction, which managed to catch the Czechoslovaks by surprise. 1st Czechoslovak separate field battalion lost one of its two anti-tank guns and a heavy machine gun. After that, a fierce fight broke out, during which, however, Czechoslovak the soldiers did not scare of the advancing enemy units and tried to destroy them with anti-tank rifles and anti-tank grenades. Since the anti-tank rifles did not have the effectiveness to penetrate the frontal armor of the German tanks, they fired into the belts or from the side and into the engine compartment. Czechoslovak soldiers repulsed several infantry attacks, but the German outnumbered them. Around five o'clock in the afternoon, the soldiers took up a circular defense around the Sokolovo church. Ludvík Svoboda decided to send Soviet tanks to counterattack. The ice broke under the first of them while crossing the river, so it was impossible to continue supporting the first company. However, this event was good news for the defending Czechoslovak and Soviet troops - it was clear that the German tank troops could no longer cross the river on the run because the ice was melting fast. Svoboda therefore ordered the soldiers fighting in Sokolovo to withdraw across the river around seven o'clock. As a result of the mortar shelling, the telephone line was cut and the radio station was also destroyed. The order to retreat did not reach Sokolovo. Likewise, the clutches, which were destroyed by German soldiers, failed to penetrate there. And so the heroic fight continued at the Sokolovo church, in which Czechoslovak soldiers proved their qualities and their bravery. First lieutenant Otakar Jaroš, who was hit when he was about to throw an anti-tank grenade at a German armored vehicle, or second lieutenant Jaroslav Lohrer-Lom, deputy commander of the defense of Sokolovo, fell. Another theory about Jaroš's death is that he was injured and run over by a German transporter. After dark, the fierce fighting stopped, the retreat of the Czechoslovak soldiers from Sokolov went on all night. The Czechoslovaks thus fulfilled their combat task, which was: not to let the Germans cross the Mzha River. However, the Germans in their battle orders only aimed to capture Sokolovo, they did not plan any further progress until Taranovka, located further south, was captured. The fighting continued on March 9, when two Czechoslovak companies launched a counterattack on Sokolovo, during which the Germans suffered further losses. On March 11, Czechoslovak radio operators intercepted a German message, thanks to which the German counterattack was revealed. Soviet artillery opened fire on the German concentration point and scattered the attacking units. After breaking through the defensive positions south of Kharkov, the 1st Czechoslovak Independent Battalion was in danger of being surrounded, so it began a tactical retreat. The fate of the Czechoslovak wounded and captured soldiers ended tragically. The Czech soldiers knew that as citizens of the protectorate they could be executed for alleged "treason", and so they were overwhelmingly taken prisoner only because of injuries or unconsciousness. The seriously wounded Czechoslovaks who were hospitalized in a hospital in Kharkov were mercilessly shot by the Germans after the city was occupied on March 14, 1943. Of the twenty prisoners, five were taken by the Germans to the protectorate for propaganda purposes, after which they were probably completely deployed in the Reich, one of them was interned in a Soviet labor camp, the Gulag, after the war.

== Aftermath ==
The Soviet supreme command highly valued both the bravery of the Czechoslovak soldiers, the political significance of the fact that the Soviet people were no longer alone in their struggle against Germany. First Lieutenant Otakar Jaroš, the commander of the 1st company (who was killed in the course of the battle and posthumously promoted to captain) was the first foreign citizen ever to be awarded the highest Soviet military order, the Hero of the Soviet Union. Moreover, one of the local schools in Sokolovo was named in his honor.

The initial personnel of the Czechoslovak army was heavily composed of Jewish refugees. It is estimated that 70 percent of the soldiers who fought at Sokolovo were Jewish. After the liberation of Ukraine, many Volhynian Czechs were drafted into the army, drastically increasing its size and leading to an increase in antisemitism. Svoboda attempted to counter this with an antisemitic show trial of Maximilian Holzer, the unit's former supply officer, who was blamed for the defeat at Sokolov. Svoboda served as the main witness at the trial. Holzer was sentenced to death but "volunteered" to a penal unit, to which he was reportedly sent with a note that he not return alive. At a 1963 press conference, Svoboda claimed that this incident occurred because of a misunderstanding.

== In popular culture ==
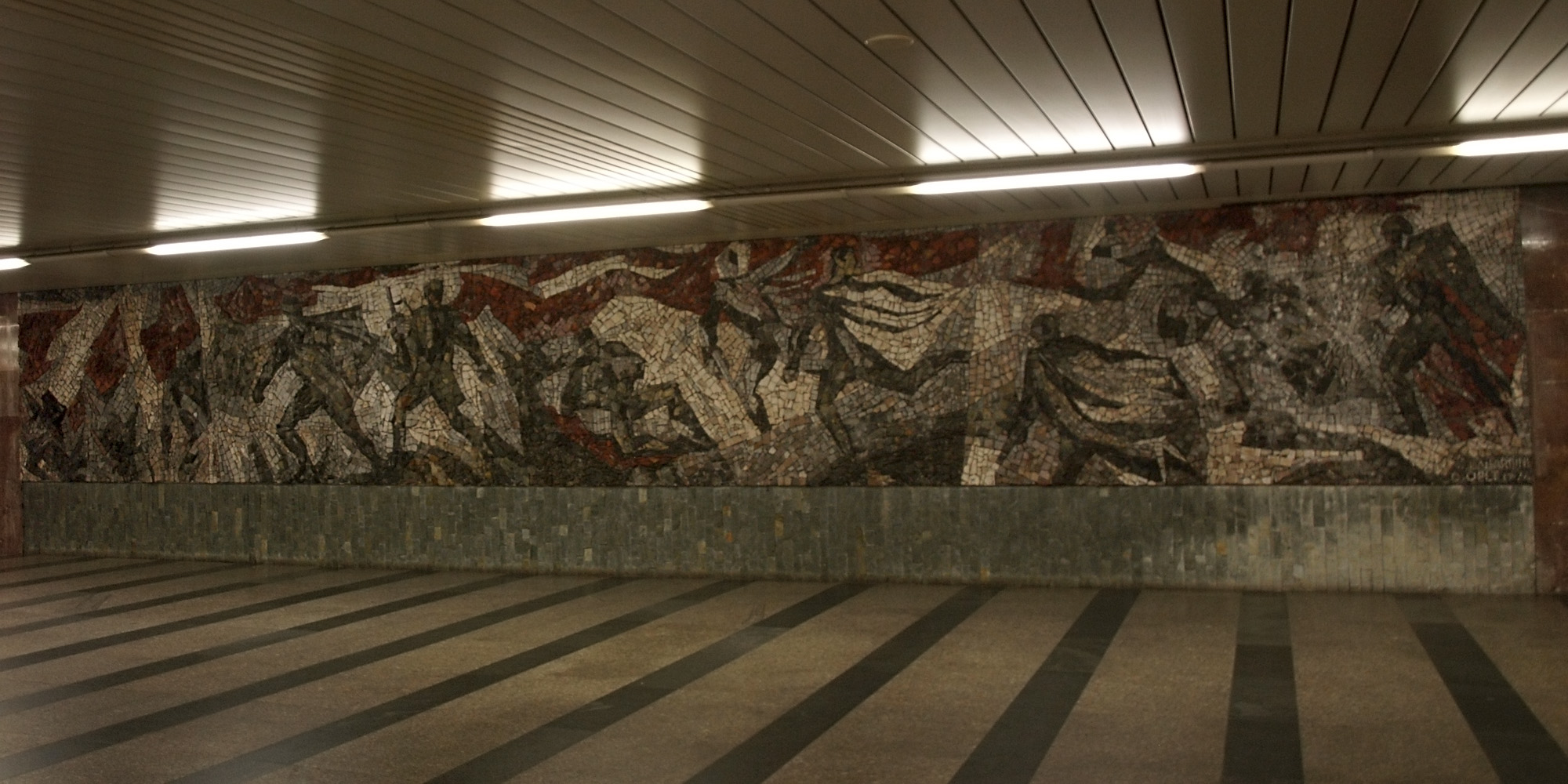
Mosaic commemorating the battle in the Florenc Station of Prague's Metro

The Battle of Sokolovo was widely celebrated under the post-war communist regime in Czechoslovakia as an example of Soviet-Czechoslovak comradeship. The town of Falkenau an der Eger in Karlovy Vary Region was renamed Sokolov in 1948 after the expulsion of Germans from Czechoslovakia. A prominent street in Prague was renamed Sokolovská street and a mosaic depicting the battle in the socialist realism style was inaugurated in the Florenc metro station in the city.

The battle became the subject matter of a 1974 Czechoslovak film with the same name, directed by Otakar Vávra.

== See also ==
Marie Ljalková, Czech sniper who became famous for her actions at Sokolovo.
