= Marie Ljalková =

Soviet-Czech World War II sniper and medic (1920–2011)

- Ljalková in 1943
- Born: Marie Petrušáková; 3 December 1920; Horodenka, Poland
- Died: 7 November 2011 (aged 90); Brno, Czech Republic
- Military career
- Allegiance: Soviet Union; Czechoslovak government-in-exile
- Branch: Red Army; 1st Czechoslovak Army Corps
- Service years: 1942–1953
- Rank: Colonel
- Unit: 1st Czechoslovak Independent Infantry Battalion
- Conflicts: World War II; Eastern Front; Battle of Sokolovo; Lower Dnieper Offensive; Dnieper–Carpathian offensive; Battle of the Dukla Pass
- Awards: Order of the White Lion; Order of the Red Star; Czechoslovak War Cross 1939–1945

Marie Ljalková-Lastovecká née Petrušáková (3 December 1920 – 7 November 2011) was a Czech Czechoslovak sniper and member of the 1st Czechoslovak Army Corps who fought in exile in World War II.

== Early life ==
Marie Petrušáková was born to a Volhynian Czech family on 3 December 1920 in Horodenka, Stanisławów Voivodeship, Poland (today in Ivano-Frankivsk Oblast, Ukraine). She lost both of her parents in 1932, at the age of 12, and was taken in by her aunt in Stanisławów (renamed Ivano-Frankivsk in 1962).

In Stanisławów, she met her first husband, Michal Ljalko, a Ruthenian from Subcarpathia who was fleeing to the Soviet Union in 1939. Through her marriage to Ljalko, she received Czechoslovak citizenship.

After the war she remarried twice.

== World War II ==
Responding to a January 1942 Soviet radio broadcast that called for Czechoslovak citizens in the Soviet Union to enlist in a new Czechoslovak Army unit, which was being formed in Buzuluk, Chkalov Oblast in southern Russia, Ljalková (together with her husband) joined the First Czechoslovak Independent Field Battalion as a volunteer on 1 March 1942, aged 21. She underwent basic military training and then began training to be a medic. It was during medic training that her shooting ability was noticed and she was instead placed in a sniper course. She and Vanda Biněvská were the only women snipers in the Czechoslovak Battalion.

Ljalková's first combat experience came during the three-day Battle of Sokolovo (8–11 March 1943), during which she was pinned down under fire from machine guns for hours on the melting ice of the Mzha River. Unable to see in the darkness, she estimated the location of the enemy, aimed her Tokarev SVT-40 sniper rifle, and eliminated the machine gun nest. She was ultimately credited with between four and seven sniper kills in the battle. Her performance was even noticed by Nazi anti-Czechoslovak propaganda in the occupied Czech lands, which sought portray the Czechoslovak military unit as outlandish.

Ljalková later became a sniper instructor of the Czechoslovak and Soviet infantry. After the women were withdrawn from combat units in 1944, she became a head medic of the Czechoslovak tank battalion.

She was credited with at least thirty confirmed kills during the war. This number is not exact according to Ljalková's own words, because the real numbers are not known.

== Post World War II ==
After the war, she studied medicine and worked as a military doctor in Olomouc and at the Central Military Hospital in Prague. She later moved to Brno hospital where she met her second husband, Václav Lastovecký. She eventually attained the rank of colonel, but due to health problems she left the army and started to work as a tour guide for Russian-speaking tourists. She spent the rest of her life in Brno.

On 28 October 2010, she received the Order of the White Lion, Second Class, the Czech Republic's second highest military honour.

== Awards and honors ==
Soviet Union

- Order of the Red Star (1943)
- Order of the Patriotic War, Second Class (1985)
- Medal "For the Victory over Germany in the Great Patriotic War 1941–1945" (1945)
- Medal "For the Liberation of Prague" (1950)

Czechoslovakia

- Czechoslovak War Cross 1939 (1943)
- Memorial Cross for Loyalty 1939–1945
- Commemorative Medal of the Czechoslovak Army Abroad (1944)
- Medal for Service to the Fatherland
- Medal for Service to the Defense of the Homeland
- Sokolov Commemorative Medal (1948)
- Dukla Commemorative Medal (1959)

Czech Republic

- Order of the White Lion, Second Class (2010)
- State Defense Cross (2008)

== Bibliography ==
- Láník, Jaroslav (2005). Vojenské osobnosti československého odboje 1939-1945. Ministerstvo obrany ČR - AVIS. ISBN 8072782339.
- Benešová, Hana (2009). "Máme snajperku!". Reflex.cz. Archived from the original on 18 February 2009.
- Jičínská, Vendula (2008). "Zdravotnice vzala pušku a šla do první linie". Brněnský deník.
