= Antonín Novotný =

Leader of Czechoslovakia from 1953 to 1968

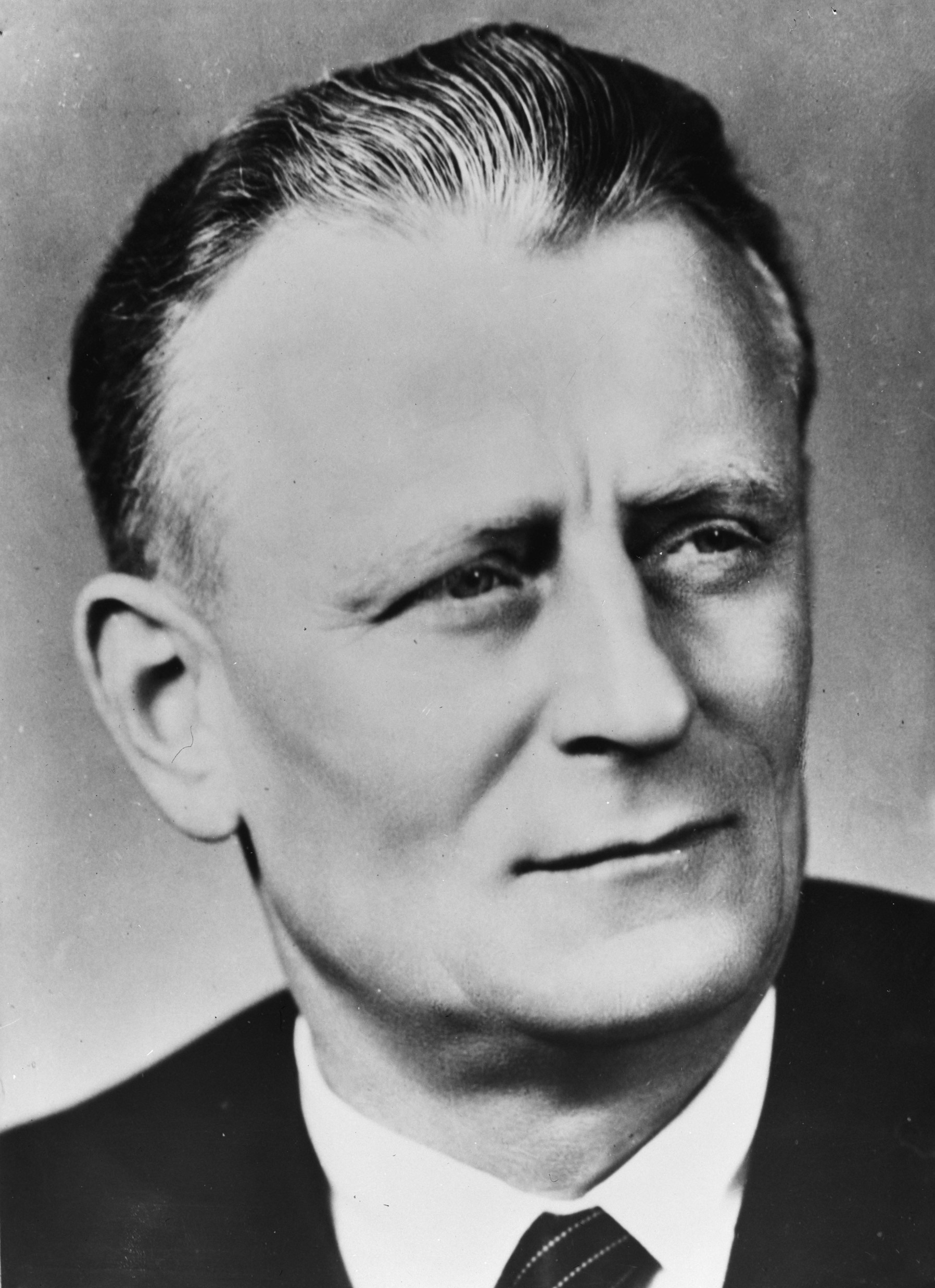
- Antonín Novotný in 1968

First Secretary of the Communist Party of Czechoslovakia
- In office 13 September 1953 – 5 January 1968
- Preceded by: Klement Gottwald (as Chairman of the Communist Party)
- Succeeded by: Alexander Dubček

President of Czechoslovakia
- In office 19 November 1957 – 22 March 1968
- Prime Minister: Viliam Široký
- Preceded by: Antonín Zápotocký
- Succeeded by: Ludvík Svoboda

Personal details
- Born: 10 December 1904 Letňany, Bohemia, Austria-Hungary
- Died: 28 January 1975 (aged 70) Prague, Czechoslovakia
- Party: Communist Party of Czechoslovakia
- Spouse: Božena Novotná
- De facto ruler of the ČSSR: ← Gottwald; Dubček →

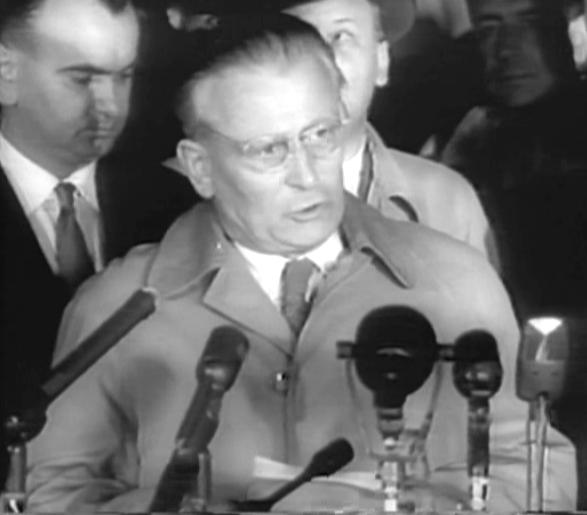
Antonin Novotny during a United Nations meeting in New York City, September 1960

Antonín Josef Novotný (Czech pronunciation: [ˈantoɲiːn ˈnovotniː]; 10 December 1904 – 28 January 1975) was a Czechoslovak politician who served as the President of Czechoslovakia from 1957 to 1968, and as First Secretary of the Communist Party of Czechoslovakia from 1953 to 1968. An ardent hardliner, Novotný was forced to yield the reins of power to Alexander Dubček during the short-lived reform movement of 1968.

== Biography ==
=== Early years ===
Antonín Novotný was born in Letňany, Bohemia, Austria-Hungary (now part of Prague, Czech Republic). The Novotný family was working class in social origin, and he worked from an early age as a blacksmith. Novotný was a charter member of the Communist Party of Czechoslovakia (CPC) at its founding in 1921, and became a professional Communist Party functionary in 1929.

In 1935, Novotný was selected as a delegate to the 7th World Congress of the Comintern. He was made a regional party secretary in Prague in 1937 and made secretary and editor of the CPC's newspaper in the South Moravian Region in 1938.

=== World War II years ===
With the coming of World War II and the occupation of Czechoslovakia by Nazi Germany in 1939, the CPC was outlawed and forced into an underground existence. Novotný served as one of the leaders of the CPC in the underground movement in Prague. Novotný was finally arrested by the German secret police, the Gestapo, in September 1941 and was immediately deported to the Mauthausen concentration camp. He managed to survive his concentration camp experience and was liberated by the U.S. Army on 5 May 1945.

=== Post-war political rise ===
After the war, Novotný returned to Czechoslovakia and resumed his activity in the Communist Party. He was elected a member of the governing Central Committee of the CPC in 1946. He was promoted to the Secretariat of the Central Committee in September 1951, and became one of the party's top leaders on the CPC's Politburo following the arrest of Rudolf Slánský for alleged "Titoism" in November of the same year.

Novotný was formally appointed as Deputy Prime Minister in February 1953. After the death of party leader Klement Gottwald in March 1953, Novotný became a leading candidate in the succession struggle, ultimately winning out in September 1953 when he was named First Secretary of the party, effectively making him the leader of Czechoslovakia.

While President Antonín Zápotocký and Prime Minister Viliam Široký wanted a less repressive way of governing, the hardliner Novotný was able to outflank them with the backing of the Soviet Union. At a meeting in Moscow in late 1953, Zápotocký and Široký were told to adhere to the principles of "collective leadership" — in other words, abandon power to Novotný.

In the Czechoslovakia of Novotný, people continued to face strict government regulations in the arts and media, although they had loosened dramatically since Stalin's death in 1953 and the subsequent de-Stalinization programmes of 1956. His quasi-authoritarian practices led to mounting calls for a new form of socialism over the unsatisfactory pace of change that would include the accountability, proper elections, and responsibility of leaders to society. Novotný's administration, however, still remained centralized for 10 years. During these years society evolved, seen through events such as the Czechoslovak film miracle. Following the death of Zápotocký in 1957, Novotný was named as President of the republic, further consolidating his grip on power. Three years later, he replaced the superficially democratic Ninth-of-May Constitution with a new constitution that was a fully Communist document. The new constitution declared that "socialism has won" in Czechoslovakia and declared the country a socialist state under the leadership of the KSČ, thus codifying the actual state of affairs that had prevailed since the Communist takeover in 1948.

In the 1960s, Novotny's attention was turned to the activities of Czech exiles in Western Europe who were seeking to discredit his Party's regime. One example of this was his suggestion to kidnap the exiled journalist, Josef Josten, from London in a specially made box. When this scheme proved impracticable, he proposed assassination, as recorded by the defecting intelligence agent, Josef Frolik.

=== Events of 1968 ===
While Novotný was forced to adopt some reforms due to popular pressure in the 1960s, these efforts were half-hearted at best. Growing public dissatisfaction caused Novotný to lose his grip on power. He was forced to resign as party leader in January 1968 and was replaced by a reformer, Alexander Dubček. In March 1968, he was ousted as president and in May he resigned from the Central Committee of the CPC.

=== Later years ===
In 1971, during the period of normalization, he was reelected to the Central Committee. However, his political influence was minimal and he was too ill to be a strong force in the Gustáv Husák administration. He died on 28 January 1975 in Prague.

== Honours and awards ==
=== Czechoslovak honours ===
- Czechoslovak War Cross 1939 (1947)
- Order of Klement Gottwald, two times (10 December 1954; 7 May 1955)

=== Foreign honours ===
- (Ethiopia) Order of the Queen of Sheba (1959)
- Knight Grand Cross of the Royal Order of Cambodia (1960)
- Star of the Republic of Indonesia, 1st Class (1961)
- (Socialist Federal Republic of Yugoslavia) Order of the Yugoslav Great Star (26 September 1964)
- (Egypt) Grand Cordon of the Order of the Nile (1966)
- (Iran) Order of Pahlavi (1967)

Political offices
Preceded by Antonín Zápotocký	President of Czechoslovakia; 19 November 1957 – 22 March 1968	Succeeded by Ludvík Svoboda
Party political offices
Preceded by Klement Gottwald as Party Chairman	First Secretary of the Communist Party of Czechoslovakia; 14 March 1953 – 5 January 1968	Succeeded by Alexander Dubček
