= 2nd Czechoslovak Paratrooper Brigade in the Soviet Union =

Czechoslovak exile military unit in the Soviet Union

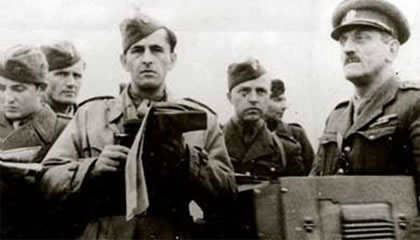
Members of the brigade staff, 10 October 1944 during the fighting near Žiar nad Hronom. In the center, Sgt. Karel Hlásný (1911-1982), on the right, Col. Vladimír Přikryl

The 2nd Czechoslovak Parachute Brigade in the Soviet Union (Slovak: 2. československá parašutistická brigáda v Sovietskom zväze; Czech: 2. československá parašutistická brigáda v Sovětském zväze) was a Czechoslovak exile military unit in the Soviet Union. Most of its personnel were former members of the 1st Infantry Division (former Rapid Division), who were captured by Soviet troops near Melitopol on 30 October 1943. The unit also participated in the Carpathian-Dukla operation with the Slovak National Uprising.

== History of the Unit ==
On 30 October 1943, at Melitopol in Ukraine, 2,091 soldiers, 38 non-commissioned officers, 4 rotmistries, and 42 officers of the Slovak 1st Infantry Division were captured by the Soviet Army. On 13 December 1943, when these soldiers were in a collection camp in Usman, a decision was made to create a cohesive military unit from volunteers.

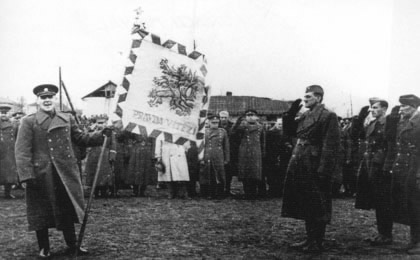
22 April 1944, after the final military exercise of the 2nd Czechoslovak Parachute Brigade, the combat flag was handed over by Gen. Heliodor Píka to the brigade commander Lt. Col. Vladimír Přikryl, chief of staff Lt. Vilém Sacher, and chief of the brigade's operational department Capt. Karl Hlásný

In early January 1944, soldiers were transferred to Jefremovo, where they were supplemented from the Czecho-Slovak Replacement Battalion in Buzuluk mainly with Carpathian Ukrainians and Volhynian Czechs, as well as Slovak partisans from Soviet partisan units. From 20 January 1944, the unit was officially called the 2nd Czechoslovak Independent Parachute Brigade in the USSR. The commander was appointed Lt. Col. Vladimír Přikryl, and the chief of staff was Staff Captain Vilém Sacher. Subsequently, the unit underwent intense 4-month parachutist training in Jefremovo. The soldiers trained under relatively harsh winter weather conditions of Russia, and Jefremovo was heavily affected by war and largely destroyed. They completed 13,559 training jumps, recording only 1 fatal injury and 176 minor accidents.

On 30 April 1944, the unit moved to the Ukrainian city of Proskurovo. Here, the unit faced its first problems, later encountered on the front. These were German bombings and an epidemic of dysentery. The unit continued demanding training until the beginning of September 1944. At that time, soldiers learned about the start of the Slovak National Uprising and demanded immediate deployment to assist it.

By order of the 1st Ukrainian Front, on 4 September, the 2nd parachute brigade began moving towards Przemyśl, where the soldiers, to their great disappointment, folded their parachutes into storage and continued to the front as foot soldiers. There, they participated in the Carpathian-Dukla Operation for 10 days. During this time, the unit lost 625 soldiers in the battles but achieved significant combat successes and gained necessary combat experience. Since the Carpathian-Dukla operation was not developing at a sufficiently dynamic pace, Soviet command heeded the rebels' pleas and withdrew the unit to the rear to move into insurgent territory.

Due to adverse weather, the air transport of the unit to Slovak territory was delayed from 25 September to 15 October 1944. At this time, however, the uprising faced a crisis, and the brigade units were deployed to the insurgent front. They carried out several important attacks in the direction of Hronská Dúbrava - Hronský Svätý Kríž. They fought at Močiar, Banská Štiavnica, Krupina sector, and also along the Zvolen - Lučenec route and in the Horehronie region. The command deployed the unit in areas with the worst situation and where the most dangerous breakthroughs by German units, which launched a general offensive against SNP after 18 October, were expected. The brigade was among the best and most disciplined insurgent units. They also faced the Tatra Division 178 in combat.

On 9 October, the Partisan Brigade Pavel was incorporated into the 2nd Czechoslovak Parachute Brigade under the command of Jozef Trojan as its 3rd battalion with 250 men.

In the final phase of the uprising's battles, the unit protected the main approaches to Banská Bystrica, but in the last days of October, it had to retreat along with insurgent and partisan units to Skalka under Prašivá in the Low Tatras. During this, the brigade lost all its equipment and its flag, which soldiers secretly buried.

As it was not deployed as a whole on the insurgent front lines, after 29 October 1944, it faced the unfortunate fact that a large part of its personnel dispersed among other partisan units or returned home after the defeat of the uprising. Some members of the brigade operating in Poľana formed a separate Czechoslovak Partisan Brigade in December, commanded by Lt. Col. Viliam Lichner.

The unit went into the mountains with the entire HŠPO, which until the front crossed on 19 February 1945, provided armed protection. In the following days, it relocated to the area of Soliská - Sedlisko - Ľupčianska Valley.

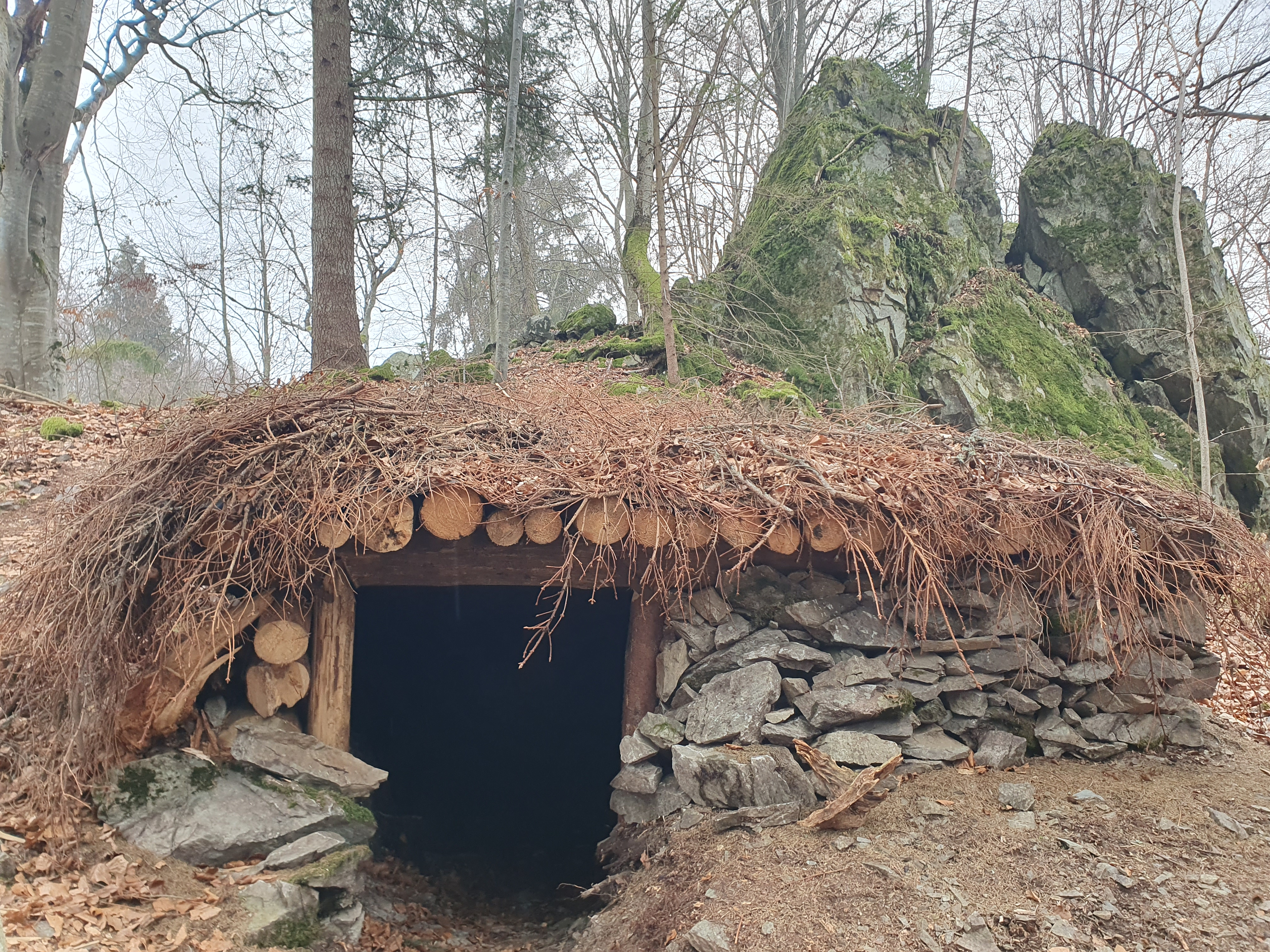
One of the three reconstructed dugouts of the 2nd Czechoslovak Parachute Brigade above Mýto pod Ďumbierom near Brezno

From 20 November 1944, the unit bore the name of the 2nd Parachute Partisan Brigade. In the mountains, the units continued fighting and several times encountered Nazi troops, e.g., in Kľačianska Dolina, on Krpáčovo, in Priehybka, on Dve vody, and elsewhere. On 19 February 1945, the remnants of the unit, numbering 96 officers, 36 non-commissioned officers, and 447 personnel, left the German rear near Brezno. They were then concentrated in the area of Kežmarok. However, during the move to the front in May 1945, they were caught by the end of the war. After the war, the unit was reorganized into the 2nd Infantry Division and secured the southern borders of Slovakia.

Despite being deployed on the eastern front and maintaining close contact with the mainly Communist HŠPO during the uprising, many of its members and especially commanders were removed from their posts or persecuted by the Communist regime after the war.

=== Special Operations Unit ===
On 15 March 1944, the Command of Czechoslovak Units in the Soviet Union established at the Replacement Battalion training center of the newly formed 2nd Czechoslovak Parachute Brigade in Jefremovo the so-called Special Operations Unit, later renamed the Special Operations Platoon under the command of Capt. Jozef Knopp. This special unit, directly subordinate to the command of the Czecho-Slovak Units in the Soviet Union, was composed of 120 of the best soldiers, mostly members of the 2nd Czechoslovak Parachute Brigade.

The special training course, led by Czechoslovak instructors recruited through the Czecho-Slovak Military Mission in the USSR from Great Britain, took place in Sadagura near Chernivtsi. Graduates of the course were to be prepared to carry out intelligence, communication, sabotage, reconnaissance, and supply tasks.

At the initiative of the leadership of the Communist Party of Czechoslovakia in Moscow, the Soviets offered exile Czech and Slovak officers the transfer to Soviet training courses. Most of the elite Czech and Slovak parachutists were sent to the Soviet partisan course in Oborovo near Rovne and from July to Sviatošina near Kyiv, subordinated to the Ukrainian Partisan Staff (UŠPH).

A special Czecho-Slovak battalion was established in the school, commanded by Capt. A. M. Kozlov. Its political deputy was KSČ party worker Maj. Augustín Schramm.

Czechoslovak soldiers were trained exclusively by Soviet instructors, drawing on their experience from partisan fighting behind enemy lines. The training focused either on a two-week specialist course in military intelligence activities or a five-week course for partisan organizers. Trainees underwent rigorous physical training, weapons shooting, destruction of bridges and railways, and topographical preparation.

Groups were formed to be inserted into Slovak territory. These groups completed several joint, mostly night, exercises and simulated combat missions. Political training and discussions with famous Soviet partisan commanders were also part of the program, providing important information on how to establish partisan groups, operate among civilians, organize supplies, and more.

From the elite Czechoslovak paratroopers, the commanders of the organizational groups were rtm. Michal Sečanský, and rtm. Ernest. Their organizational groups were landed in Slovakia in the first wave of landings on 6-8 August 1944.
