= Hroznatín =

- Municipality
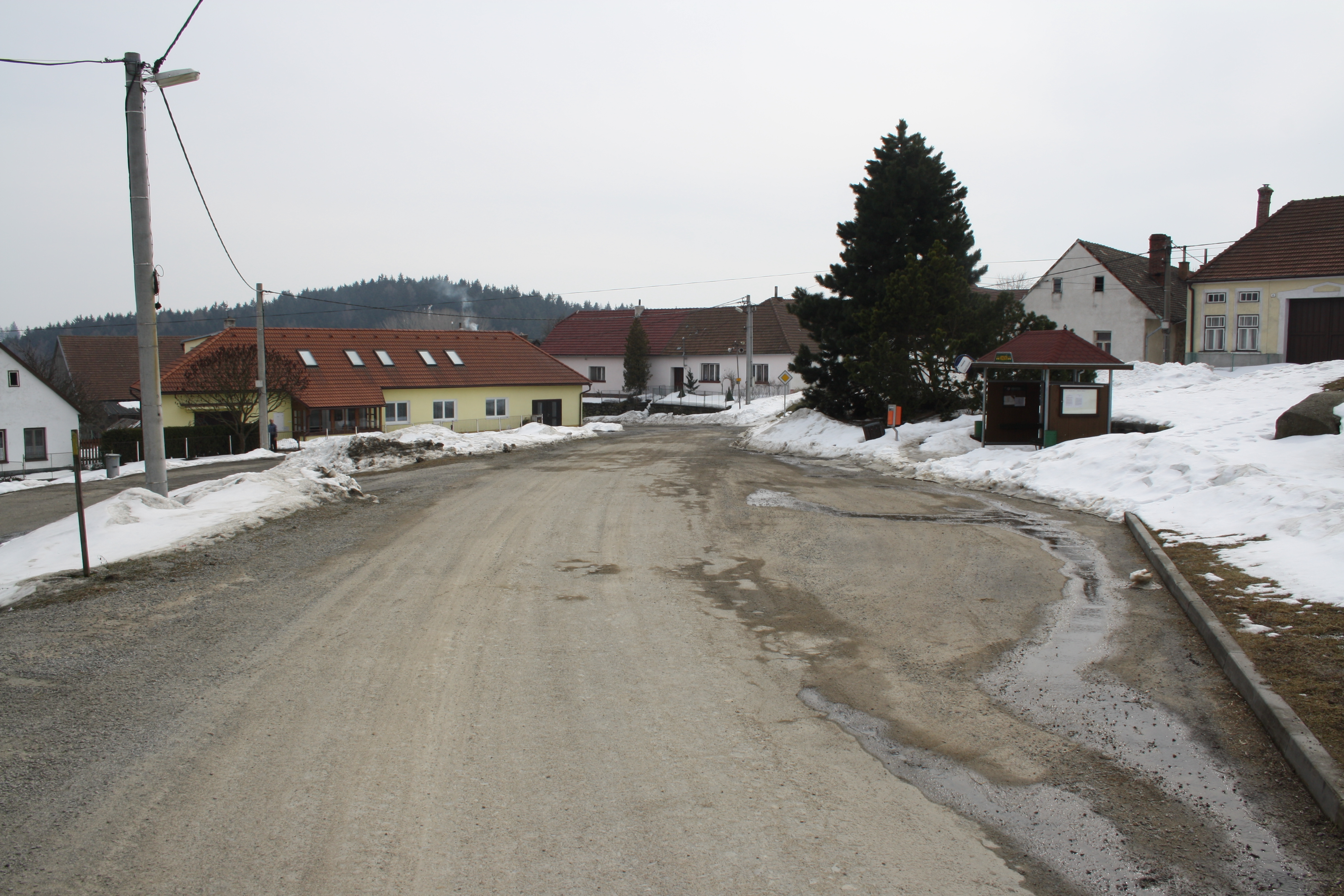
- Centre of Hroznatín

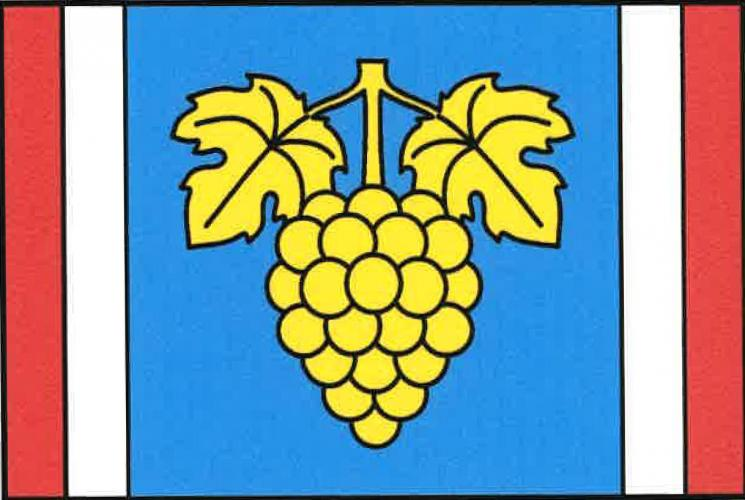
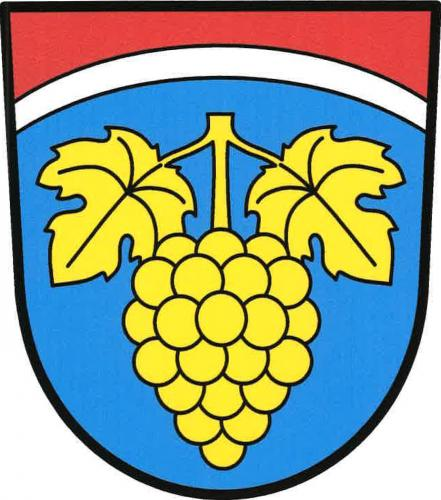
- Flag Coat of arms

- Location in the Czech Republic
- Coordinates: 49°17′52″N 15°54′30″E
- Country: Czech Republic
- Region: Vysočina
- District: Třebíč
- First mentioned: 1365

Area
  - Total: 3.91 km^{2} (1.51 sq mi)
- Elevation: 587 m (1,926 ft)

Population (2026-01-01)
  - Total: 108
  - Density: 27.6/km^{2} (71.5/sq mi)
- Time zone: UTC+1 (CET)
  - Summer (DST): UTC+2 (CEST)
- Postal code: 675 05
- Website: www.hroznatin.cz

Hroznatín (Czech pronunciation: [ˈɦroznaciːn]) is a municipality and village in Třebíč District in the Vysočina Region of the Czech Republic. It has about 100 inhabitants.

== Demographics ==
Historical population
Year	Pop.	±%
1869	152	—
1880	189	+24.3%
1890	170	−10.1%
1900	167	−1.8%
1910	176	+5.4%
1921	208	+18.2%
1930	186	−10.6%
1950	164	−11.8%
1961	176	+7.3%
1970	158	−10.2%
1980	146	−7.6%
1991	112	−23.3%
2001	99	−11.6%
2011	112	+13.1%
2021	111	−0.9%
Source: Censuses

== Notable people ==
- Ludvík Svoboda (1895–1979), general, President of Czechoslovakia in 1968–1975
