= 1st Czechoslovak Fighter Air Regiment =

- Active: June 1944 – 1945
- Allegiance: Czechoslovakia
- Engagements: World War II: Slovak National Uprising

Aircraft flown
- Fighter: Lavochkin La-5

The 1st Czechoslovak Fighter Air Regiment was a Soviet-supported aviation regiment manned by Czech and Slovak nationals during World War II. Operating the Lavochkin La-5, it was organized in June 1944 and, the following September, was deployed in support of insurgent forces during the Slovak National Uprising.

== Notable personnel ==
- František Fajtl
- Jan Klán
- Josef Stehlík

== See also ==
- Slovak Insurgent Air Force
