= Ludvík Svoboda =

President of Czechoslovakia from 1968 to 1975

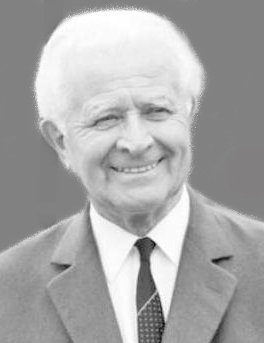
- Svoboda in 1968

President of Czechoslovakia
- In office 30 March 1968 – 29 May 1975
- Prime Minister: Jozef Lenárt; Oldřich Černík; Lubomír Štrougal
- Preceded by: Antonín Novotný
- Succeeded by: Gustáv Husák

Minister of National Defence of Czechoslovakia
- In office 5 April 1945 – 25 April 1950
- Preceded by: Jan Masaryk
- Succeeded by: Alexej Čepička

Personal details
- Born: 25 November 1895 Hroznatín, Moravia, Austria-Hungary
- Died: 20 September 1979 (aged 83) Prague, Czechoslovakia
- Party: Communist Party of Czechoslovakia
- Spouse: Irena Svobodová (m. 1923)
- Children: 2, including Zoe

Military service
- Allegiance: Austria-Hungary; Czechoslovakia
- Branch/service: Austro-Hungarian Army; Czechoslovak Legions; Czechoslovak Army
- Years of service: 1915; 1916–1950
- Rank: General of the Army
- Commands: 1st Czechoslovak Army Corps in the USSR
- Battles/wars: World War I; Eastern Front; Russian Civil War; Battle of Zborov; Battle of Bakhmach; World War II; Battle of Sokolovo; Battle of Kiev; Battle of the Dukla Pass; Prague Offensive
- Awards: Military Order of the White Lion; Cross of St. George; Order of Suvorov; Legion of Honour; Legion of Merit; Order of the Bath

Ludvík Svoboda (Czech pronunciation: [ˈludviːk ˈsvoboda]; 25 November 1895 – 20 September 1979) was a Czech general and politician. He fought in both World Wars, for which he was regarded as a national hero, and he later served as the president of Czechoslovakia from 1968 to 1975.

== Early and personal life ==
Svoboda was born in Hroznatín, Margraviate of Moravia, Austria-Hungary (now part of Vysočina Region, Czech Republic), to the family of Jan Svoboda. His father died when he was one year old and he was raised by his mother Františka who remarried to František Nejedlý. Svoboda attended the agricultural school at Velké Meziříčí and worked at a vineyard. In 1915, he had to join the Austro-Hungarian Army.

Svodoba married Irena Svobodová (1901–1980) in 1923. One of their 2 children include the Czech economist and academic, Zoe Klusáková-Svobodová (1925–2022).

== World War I ==
Svoboda was sent to the Eastern Front, and fell into Russian captivity on 18 September 1915 at Tarnopol. He joined the Czechoslovak Legion and took part in the battles of Zborov and Bakhmach. He returned home through a "Siberian anabasis".

== Interwar period ==
Svoboda worked at his father's estate before launching his military career in the Czechoslovak Army as a member of the 3rd (Jan Žižka) infantry regiment in Kroměříž in 1921. He married Irena Stratilová in 1923. In the same year, Svoboda was transferred to the 36th infantry regiment in Uzhhorod, Subcarpathia, then part of Czechoslovakia, until 1931. He passed several courses and also learned the Hungarian language, which he taught between 1931 and 1934 at the Military Academy. He was promoted to the rank of lieutenant colonel in 1934 and transferred back to the 3rd infantry regiment. Lieutenant Colonel Svoboda served in several positions, and became a battalion commander until the German occupation of the rest of Czechoslovakia on 15 March 1939.

== World War II ==
After the German occupation and the establishment of the Protectorate of Bohemia and Moravia Lieutenant Colonel Svoboda became a member of a secret underground organization Obrana národa ("Defence of the Nation"). It is supposed that at the same time he established a connection with Soviet intelligence. In June 1939 he fled to Poland, and as the oldest and most senior officer formed a Czechoslovak military unit in Kraków. Hundreds of emigrating junior officers passed through this camp. Within three months, 1,200 airmen were dispatched to France. Those soldiers who remained in Poland joined the Czech Republic military unit on the territory of Poland.

The Polish president allowed the Czechoslovaks a military unit designated the "Legion of Czechs and Slovaks" only on 3 September 1939, the third day after the German invasion of Poland, so Svoboda had little opportunity to intervene in the fighting. After the defeat of Poland in September 1939, Svoboda transferred a group of more than 700 officers and soldiers to the Soviet Union (USSR) for asylum. The escape of the group to Romania was ruled out because there was a threat that the Romanians would hand them over to the Germans. In the USSR, the group was immediately renamed the "Eastern Group of the Czechoslovak Republic army". The group crossed without weapons and in civilian clothes, but as a military unit with the consent of the Czechoslovak ambassador in Poland, Juraj Slávik, and after negotiations with the Soviet diplomatic authorities on the territory of Poland. In order not to disperse as civilian emigrants to the Soviet Union, which at that time had a mutual non-aggression agreement with Germany (within the so-called Ribbentrop–Molotov Pact), the soldiers were isolated from the public in internment camps, where they lived according to Czechoslovak Republic army regulations. These internment camps were neither POW camps, nor labor camps, nor gulags.

During the internment, the "Čs. Eastern military groups" moved successively to Kamenec Podolský, Olchovce, Jarmolince, Oranky and the Spaso-Jevfimij Monastery in Suzdal. There was no Czechoslovak diplomatic representation on the territory of the USSR at that time, so Lt. Col. Svoboda led diplomatic negotiations with the Soviet authorities for two years, until the invasion of the Soviet Union by Germany. His goals were to keep the Czechoslovak military group together, to keep it materially supported, and to transport the larger part of its officers and non-commissioned officers to countries that fought against Germany—that is, first to France, then after France's fall, to Great Britain, and finally to the Middle East. A total of 12 transports with 662 men, 12 women and 6 children were dispatched with the help of the Soviets. At that time the Czechoslovak government in exile, led by President Edvard Beneš, was not yet recognized by Czechoslovakia's pre-Munich allies—that is, France and Great Britain. They had not yet declared the Munich Agreement and the borders of the Protectorate of Bohemia and Moravia invalid. Czechoslovak airmen had to serve in the French Foreign Legion in France until it was invaded by Germany, but their military ranks were reduced or not recognized.

On 18 July 1941, one month after Germany attacked the USSR, Czechoslovak political representatives signed an agreement with the Soviet Union on the restoration of diplomatic relations and mutual cooperation in the war against Germany. The agreement made it possible to organize a separate Czechoslovak military unit in the Soviet Union. Lt. Col. Svoboda was significantly involved in the preparation of this military agreement and also in negotiating the conditions for the cooperation of the Soviet and Czechoslovak intelligence services. On the Czechoslovak side, the liaison officer was Colonel Heliodor Píka. Because of this, Svoboda left the USSR several times for Istanbul, Turkey.

Colonel Pika had already been leading a secret Czechoslovak military mission in Moscow during the spring of 1941, with Lt. Col. Svoboda as his deputy. At the turn of May and June 1941, Svoboda and intelligence officer Hieke-Stoj contacted L. Krna, the deputy ambassador of the Slovak Republic (a client state of Nazi Germany) in Moscow. Hieke-Stoj persuaded the diplomat to cooperate. In connection with this action, Svoboda was detained by Soviet counter-intelligence and accused of conspiring with Germany, the enemy of the Soviet Union, and of espionage. The misunderstanding was cleared up and Svoboda was acquitted of the charges. According to the speculative considerations of some historians, at that time Svoboda "committed to cooperation with the Soviet secret service, in which he remained until the end of his life". However, no evidence has been found for this claim. In Svoboda's diary, there is an entry related to this matter, which clarifies the reason for his detention and accusation of espionage. The head of the mission, Col. Píka, neglected to announce his and other members of the mission's contacts with the Slovak diplomat Dr. Krn. By this omission, “… he brought the mission, especially himself and me, into a very unpleasant situation, and thereby his and my position in the USSR was greatly deteriorated and confidence was shaken. I believe that this was the reason why the encryption key was demanded from us and the control over the radio traffic was tightened."

In the spring of 1942, attaché Josef Berounský sailed from Murmansk back to Great Britain on the cruiser HMS Edinburgh. He carried an important message from the head of the Czechoslovak military mission, Col. Heliodor Píka for the Czechoslovak government—a report on Czechoslovak citizens imprisoned in Soviet gulags co-signed by Lt. Col. Svoboda. On 30 April 1942, the cruiser was attacked by a German submarine and Josef Berounský died in his cabin. This event also influenced the work of Svoboda. With the death of Berounský, he lost hope that the conditions in which the Czechoslovak unit was formed would change. Svoboda blamed the Soviets for delaying the implementation of the agreement and had sharp disputes with Ambassador Zdeněk Fierlinger, the representative of the Czech government in exile, on the subject. The possibility of Svoboda going abroad was also dropped.

The activity of Svoboda throughout the rest of the war was connected with the organization and command of the Czechoslovak troops in the USSR. Svoboda, together with a group of 93 officers and non-commissioned officers that he prepared during the internment (the Oran Group), organized an independent field battalion from volunteers—Czechoslovak citizens who signed up from all over the USSR—which became the germ of the 1st Czechoslovak Army Corps. However, this battalion had to be organizationally included in the structure of the Red Army. The unit included not only Czechs, Slovaks, Ruthenians from Subcarpathian Rus, Czechoslovak Jews and expatriates living in the territory of the USSR, but also German and Hungarian anti-fascists with Czechoslovak citizenship. Svoboda also accepted women into the army, although this was not in accordance with the rules of the Czechoslovak army. With the arrival of other volunteers, especially Rusyns who came from the gulags and Slovaks who went into Soviet captivity during the war—in which the puppet Slovak state was involved on the side of the Third Reich—the battalion gradually grew into an independent mixed brigade and then into an army corps. It became the largest Czechoslovak military unit abroad. Czechoslovak soldiers served on the Eastern Front the longest of all units of the Czechoslovak foreign army fighting against Germany in the Second World War.

Before going to the front—on 30 January 1943—Svoboda was promoted to colonel. Colonel Svoboda commanded a battalion that distinguished itself at Sokolovo (in the fight against the retaliatory operation of the German army for Stalingrad and Kharkiv). He commanded a brigade that played a significant role in the liberation of the capital of Ukraine, Kiev, and in the battles for western Ukraine. In December 1943, after the liberation of Kiev, he was appointed brigadier general. The brigade under his command liberated the cities of Ruda, Bíla Cerkev and many others. At Žaškov, the brigade took part in the Battle of Korsun–Cherkassy.

On 18 May 1944, Brigadier General Jan Kratochvíl was appointed commander of the 1st Czechoslovak Army Corps. Under his command, the corps was deployed in the Carpathian-Dukel operation. "On 10 September 1944, command of the 1st Czechoslovak Corps passed from Brigadier General Jan Kratochvíl to Brigadier General Ludvík Svoboda (by order of the commander of the 1st Ukrainian Front, Marshal of the USSR Konev). The change of commander was related to the unsuccessful start of the operation on 9 September 1944." Historian Jiří Bílek evaluates Kratochvíl's dismissal as "unjustified". Jan Bystrický quotes the assessment of the MS. Ministry of National Defense in London, which recognized the reasons for Koněv's decision.

The corps was further organized on the basis of the arrival of other volunteers, especially Volyn Czechs. The corps distinguished itself in the Carpathian-Dukel operation—the largest mountain operation of the Second World War and the largest operation in the Czechoslovak Republic army in its history. The artillerymen of the army corps took part in a massive artillery training in the Jaslo operation, aimed at the liberation of Kraków and eastern Poland. The army corps was liberating Slovakia and eastern Moravia. After the mobilization of Slovaks and the involvement of local partisans, the number of soldiers increased to roughly 50,000. On 3 April 1945, General Karel Klapálek took command of the corps. A tank brigade and a mixed air division from the corps took part in the Moravia–Ostrava offensive.

In January 1945, after the entry of the corps into Slovak territory, Svoboda established a corps counterintelligence service at the direct request of Soviet General Lev Zacharovič Mechlis, a member of the military council of the 4th Ukrainian Front, who coordinated the activities of the intelligence services of the front. General Svoboda originally wanted to entrust Major František Sedláček with command of the counterintelligence service, but Gen. Mechlis advocated for First Lieutenant Bedřich Reicin and prevailed.

On 4 April 1945, President Edvard Beneš appointed Zdeněk Fierlinger's First Cabinet. Svoboda was appointed as a non-partisan Minister of National Defense and entrusted General Klapálek with the command of the army corps. Klapálek, along with several other generals and a number of junior officers, came from England on his request. These officers reinforced the command corps of the unit. Some came to the brigade before battle of Kyiv, some even to the corps and took part in the liberation of Slovakia and eastern Moravia.

Svoboda was promoted to divisional general on 10 May 1945. He became an army corps general on 1 August 1945.

== Post-war political career ==
In World War II a substantial part of Czechoslovakia was liberated by the Red Army and the 1st Czechoslovak Army Corps under the leadership of Svoboda. Svoboda was appointed Minister of Defense while being welcomed as a hero of the Eastern Front. The Soviet Union enjoyed great popularity among the population, and in the elections of 1946 the Communist Party of Czechoslovakia won 38% of the vote nationwide.

On 22 February 1948, nearly all of the non-Communist cabinet ministers resigned in protest against the practices of Communist Party chairman Klement Gottwald and the other Communists. Minister of Defense Svoboda was one of the few who remained in office. The Communist-dominated Revolutionary Trade Union Movement voted unanimously to replace the 12 departed ministers with pro-Communist ministers. As armed workers and the People's Militias took to the streets, Svoboda refused to quell the insurrection with military force, saying "the army will not march against the people". Two days later (and one day after a general strike in which 2.5 million citizens participated), President Edvard Beneš gave in to growing pressure from Gottwald and appointed a government dominated by Communists and pro-Soviet Social Democrats—in effect, giving legal sanction to a Communist coup. The takeover was completely bloodless. Svoboda, whose label had been that of an "apolitical" minister since the first days of his term, then joined the Communist Party and was elected as a deputy to the National Assembly at the 1948 election.

Svoboda was forced out of the army (in which he had reached the rank of Army General in November 1945) in 1950 under pressure from the Soviets. He was Deputy Prime Minister from 1950 to 1951. In the purges which followed, Svoboda was imprisoned and "recommended" to save his image by committing suicide, but eventually released and stripped of all offices. His return to public life took place upon a personal wish of Nikita Khrushchev, whom Svoboda had met during the war, and he subsequently headed the Klement Gottwald Military Political Academy.

In 1946 he was awarded the title People's Hero of Yugoslavia. Svoboda was also awarded the title Hero of the Soviet Union on 24 November 1965, and Hero of the Czechoslovak Socialist Republic (he was awarded the latter title again in 1970 and 1975). He was awarded the Lenin Peace Prize (1970).

== Presidency ==
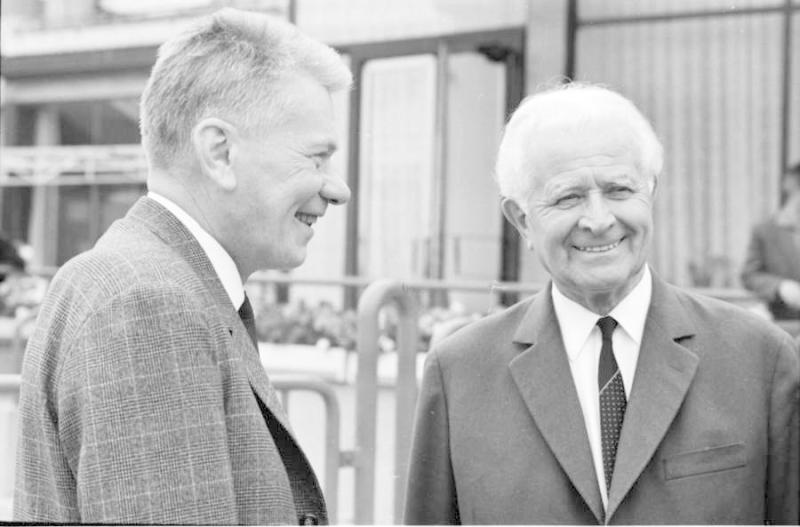
Josef Smrkovský and Ludvík Svoboda

In early 1968, Antonín Novotný was forced to resign, a pivotal moment leading to the Prague Spring. Svoboda was elected President of Czechoslovakia on 30 March 1968, on the recommendation of Alexander Dubček, the First Secretary. He was an acceptable candidate for both Czechs and Slovaks, and as a war hero and a victim of the purges of the early 1950s, he enjoyed a very high esteem among the population.

President Svoboda was mildly supportive of the reform process of the new Party leadership until the Warsaw Pact intervention in August 1968. On 17 August 1968, at a meeting with the Soviet ambassador, Stepan Chervonenko, Svoboda warned against an invasion, saying it would be a "catastrophe" and would cause the peoples of Czechoslovakia "to lose all faith in the Soviet Union for many generations to come ... Don't you dare resort to military means to resolve the situation". Horrified at his experiences in two world wars, he signed an order preventing the Czechoslovak Army from getting involved with the invading Warsaw Pact troops. He traveled to Moscow in order to secure the release of Dubček and the other reform leaders, who had been kidnapped by the invading forces. However, when Svoboda arrived, Leonid Brezhnev demanded that he appoint a "peasant-workers' government" in order to give credence to the planned official line—that hardliners in the KSČ had themselves requested the invasion. Svoboda not only refused, but threatened to put a bullet into his head in the presence of Brezhnev unless Dubček and the other reformists were released.

Nevertheless, Svoboda could do nothing to prevent Brezhnev from forcing the Czechoslovak representatives to sign the notorious Moscow protocols. These were kept secret and permitted what an October parliamentary session would euphemistically call a "temporary stay" for Warsaw Pact armies in Czechoslovakia. The protocols also mandated the Party leadership to promote political, cultural and other changes to stop the reform process. Svoboda also supported Minister of Defence Martin Dzúr, who ordered the Czechoslovak army not to show any resistance.

== Normalization period ==
President Svoboda survived the removal of reformist Communists in Czechoslovakia in the aftermath of the Prague Spring, while passively witnessing the purges and the suffocation of the civil liberties that had briefly been restored. He even helped muzzle the press and contributed to Dubček's replacement with Gustáv Husák in April 1969. To the day he died, he believed and maintained that his submissive conduct before Brezhnev helped save thousands of lives from "immense consequences"; and he defended this policy by invoking his own memories of the horrors of war.

Husák never trusted Svoboda, and made numerous attempts to oust him. Svoboda was able to resist until 1975, when he was forced to retire through a constitutional act (paragraph 64 Nr.143/1968 Sb.). This act stated that if the incumbent president was unable to carry out his duties for a year or more, the Federal Assembly had the right to elect a permanent successor. In Svoboda's case, he had been in ill health for some time, making the act relevant. Husák succeeded him.

Despite being misused by politicians for their goals several times, Svoboda still enjoys some credibility among Czechs and Slovaks, probably due to his bravery during crucial moments of Czechoslovak history. Squares and streets in both the Czech Republic and Slovakia continue to bear his name, while those of most other Communist-era leaders were removed after the Velvet Revolution. His attitude can be perhaps explained in his own words: "All I have ever done must be measured by my intention to serve best my people and my country."

== Honours and awards ==
Czechoslovakia (1920–1939)

- Order of the Falcon, with swords
- Order of King Charles IV
- Order of M. R. Štefánik

Czechoslovakia

- Gold Star Hero of the Czechoslovak Socialist Republic, three times (24 November 1965, 30 April 1970, 30 May 1975)
- Order of Klement Gottwald, three times (1959, 1970, 1975)
- Military Order of the White Lion "For Victory", 1st class (1945)
- Order of the Slovak National Uprising, 1st class
- Czechoslovak War Cross 1939–1945, three times
- Czechoslovak Medal "for bravery before the enemy" (1945)
- Czechoslovak Medal "For Merit" a degree of
- Commemorative medal of the second national resistance
- Allied victory Medal
- Zborovskaya commemorative medal
- Bahmachskaya commemorative medal
- Commemorative medals en. community for 1918–1919 dobrovolecke (badge)
- Medal cs.dobrovolnika 1918–1919 (crisis)
- Commemorative medals: 3rd Infantry Regiment Jan Žižka; 4th Rifle Regiment Prokop the Great; 5th Rifle Regiment T. G. M.; 6th Rifle Regiment Hanácké; 9th Rifle Regiment K.H. Borovsky; 10th Rifle Regiment P. J. Kozina; 21st Rifle Regiment terronskeho; 30th Infantry Regiment A. Jirasek; 1st Motorised Regiment John Sparks of Brandys; Artillery troops in Russia; machine building company separate traffic workshop of train troops in Russia; dobrovoleckeho Corps in Italy 1918–1948
- Memorial Cross, Russian Legion 2nd Regiment
- Štefánikův commemorative badge
- Military commemorative medals with the label of the USSR (1945)
- Dukelskaya commemorative medal
- Sokolovskaya commemorative medal
- Honour Field Squadron pilot cs. Army
- Honour Czechoslovak military pilot
- Badge cs. guerrilla
- Commemorative Medal of the second national resistance
- Honorary Medal for Fighter against fascism, 1st class
- Commander of the Order of the Czechoslovak Sokol TCH CS Vojenský řád Bílého lva 1st (1945)
- Czechoslovak War Cross 1918
- Order of 25 February, 1st class
- Order Wins the February
- Czechoslovak Cross of Valour 1914–1918

Russian Empire

- Cross of St George, 3rd and 4th classes (1917)

Soviet Union

- Hero of the Soviet Union (24 November 1965)
- Two Orders of Lenin (1943, 1965)
- Order of the October Revolution (1970)
- Order of Suvorov, 1st (1945) and 2nd (1943) classes
- Medal "For the Victory over Germany in the Great Patriotic War 1941–1945" (1945)
- Medal "For the Liberation of Prague" (1945)
- Lenin Peace Prize "for peace between nations" (1970)

Poland

- Virtuti Militari, 1st class(1947)
- Cross of Grunwald, 1st class (1948)
- Order of Polonia Restituta, 1st class (1969)
- Military Cross (1944)
- Medal for Warsaw 1939–1945
- Medal for Oder, Neisse and Baltic
- Medal of Victory and Freedom 1945

Other

- Order of the People's Hero (Yugoslavia, 1946)
- Order "For Service to the people", 1st class (Yugoslavia)
- Order of Red Banner (Hungary)
- Order "For Merit", 1st class (Hungary, 1950)
- Grand Officer of the Legion of Honour (France)
- Croix de guerre 1939–1945 (France)
- Knight Commander of the Order of the Bath (United Kingdom)
- Legion of Merit, Commander (United States, 1945)
- Order of the White Rose of Finland (Finland, 1969)
- Order of the Supreme Sun (Afghanistan, 1970)
- Commemorative Medal of the 2,500th Anniversary of the founding of the Persian Empire (14 October 1971)

== Cultural references ==
Ludvík Svoboda has been portrayed, as himself or a character based on him, in a number of films and television series:

- Sokolovo is a 1974 film about the Battle of Sokolovo. Ladislav Chudík portrays Svoboda.
- The Liberation of Prague is a 1977 film about the Prague uprising. Svoboda is once again portrayed by Ladislav Chudík.
- Dubček is a 2018 Slovak film that shows events in 1968. Svoboda is portrayed by Vladimír Hrabal.
- Czech Century is a 2013 historical television series chronicling Czech history from 1918. Emil Horváth portrays Svoboda in the series.

== See also ==
- Ústí massacre
- List of heads of state and government with military background

== Books ==
- Navrátil, Jaromir; Benčík, Antonín (1998). The Prague Spring, 1968. Central European University Press. ISBN 9789633864715.

Government offices
Preceded by Jan Syrový (before World War II)	Minister of Defence of Czechoslovakia; 1945–1950	Succeeded by Alexej Čepička
Preceded by Antonín Novotný	President of Czechoslovakia; 30 March 1968 – 28 May 1975	Succeeded by Gustáv Husák
