= Milan Rastislav Štefánik Order =

Milan Rastislav Stefanik Order

Awarded by the President of the Czech and Slovak Federal Republic
- Established: 1990
- Country: Czech and Slovak Federative Republic
- Motto: Veriť - Milovať - Pracovať (Trust - Love - Work)
- Eligibility: Soldiers, members of the armed brigades, and other persons within these forces and battalions of armed forces
- Awarded for: "to recognize eminent contributions to the defence and security of the Czech and Slovak Federative Republic"
- Status: No longer awarded

Statistics
- Last induction: 1992
- Total inductees: 84

The Milan Rastislav Štefánik Order is an award given "to recognize eminent contributions to the defence and security of the Czech and Slovak Federative Republic". It was bestowed by the President of the Czech and Slovak Federative Republic. The award is named after Milan Rastislav Štefánik.

Ribbon bars
1st Class	2nd Class	3rd Class	4th Class	5th Class

== List of recipients ==
- President of the Czech and Slovak Federative Republic - First Class Insignia of the Order
- Colonel Josef Adam - Third Class, 1991
- Lieutenant General Jan Ambrus - Third Class, 1992
- Colonel Zdeněk Bachůrek - Third Class, 1991
- Brigadier General Josef Balabán - Second Class, 1992
- Major Alfréd Bartoš - Third Class, 1992
- Colonel Václav Beran, M. Sc. - Fourth Class, 1992
- Army General Josef Bílý - Second Class, 1992
- Colonel František Bogataj - Third Class, 1992
- Brigadier General Jozef Brunovský - Third Class, 1991
- Brigadier General Josef Buršík - Third Class, 1991
- Colonel Vladimir Cupák - Third Class, 1991
- Brigadier General Vojtech Gejza Danielovič - Second Class, 1992
- Colonel Karel Drbohlav, M. Sc. - Third Class, 1991
- Brigadier General Stanislav Dvorský - Third Class, 1991
- Brigadier General František Fajtl - Third Class, 1991
- Army General MVDr. Mikuláš Ferjenčík - Second Class, 1992
- Colonel Josef Flekal - Third Class, 1991
- Captain Jozef Gabčík - Third Class, 1992
- Lieutenant General Ján Golian - Third Class, 1991
- Captain Eva Havejová - Fourth Class, 1992
- Lieutenant Colonel Rudolf Hašek - Third Class, 1992
- Colonel František Hieke - Third Class, 1991
- Colonel Stanislav Hlučka - Third Class, 1991
- Colonel Otakar Hrubý - Third Class, 1991
- Brigadier General Otakar Husák, M. Sc. - Second Class, 1992
- Colonel František Chabera - Third Class, 1991
- Army General Sergej Ingr - Third Class, 1991
- Army General Karel Janoušek - Second Class, 1992
- Colonel Miroslav Jiroudek - Third Class, 1991
- Colonel Josef Knop - Third Class, 1991
- Lieutenant General Jan Kratochvíl - Third Class, 1991
- Brigadier General Jozef Martin Kristín - Second Class, 1992
- Brigadier General Rudolf Krzák - Third Class, 1991
- Captain Jan Kubiš - Third Class, 1992
- Colonel Otmar Kučera - Third Class, 1992
- Army General Karel Kutlvašr - Second Class, 1992
- Brigadier General Vladislav Kužel-Znievčan - Third Class, 1992
- Army General Alois Liška - Third Class, 1991
- Colonel Antonín Liška - Third Class, 1991
- Brigadier General Karel Lukas - Third Class, 1992
- Army General Vojtěch Luza, M. Sc. - Second Class, 1992
- Colonel Jiří Maňák - Third Class, 1992
- Colonel Anton Martiš - Third Class, 1991
- Brigadier General Josef Mašín - Second Class, 1992
- Brigadier General František Moravec - Third Class, 1991
- Lieutenant Colonel Václav Morávek - Second Class, 1992
- Brigadier General Karel Mrázek, M. Sc. - Third Class, 1991
- Colonel Egon Nezbeda, M. Sc. - Third Class, 1991
- Brigadier General Július Nosko - Second Class, 1992
- Colonel Teodor Obuch, M. Sc. - Fourth Class, 1992
- Major Adolf Opálka - Third Class, 1991
- Colonel Josef Pavelka - Third Class, 1991
- Colonel Bohumil Pelikán - Third Class, 1991
- Brigadier General Rudolf Pernický - Third Class, 1991
- Major General Heliodor Píka - Third Class, 1991
- Colonel Zdeněk Procházka - Third Class, 1991
- Colonel Jan Prokop - Third Class, 1991
- Brigadier General Vladimír Přikryl - Third Class, 1991
- Lieutenant Colonel Pavol Pukančík - Third Class, 1991
- Colonel Stanislav Rajmon - Third Class, 1991
- Captain Prof. M. D. Alexander Rehák, DrSc. - Fourth Class, 1992
- Brigadier General František Řežábek - Third Class, 1991
- Colonel Tomáš Sedláček - Third Class, 1991
- Colonel chartered economist Karol Schwarz - Third Class, 1992
- Colonel Alois Sítek - Fourth Class, 1992
- Colonel Vladimír Slánský - Third Class, 1991
- Major Otto Smik - Third Class, 1992
- Colonel Josef Stehlík - Third Class, 1991
- Colonel Karel Šeda - Third Class, 1991
- Colonel Alois Šiška - Third Class, 1991
- Major Antonín Šída - Third Class, 1991
- Miloš Uher - Fourth Class, 1992
- Captain Ján Ušiak - Fourth Class, 1992
- Brigadier General Alois Vašátko - Third Class, 1992
- Brigadier General Jaroslav Vedral - Third Class, 1991
- Brigadier General Miloš Vesel - Third Class, 1992
- Brigadier General Mirko Vesel - Second Class, 1992
- Lieutenant Colonel Josef Veselý - Third Class, 1991
- Army General Rudolf Viest - Third Class, 1991
- Colonel Josef Vopalecky - Third Class, 1991
- Colonel Otto Wagner - Third Class, 1991
- Brigadier General František Weber - Third Class, 1991
- Brigadier General Richard Zdráhala - Third Class, 1991
- Brigadier General Viliam Žingor - Third Class, 1991
