= Josef Bursik =

Josef Bursik may refer to:

- Josef Buršík (1911–2002), Czech resistance fighter, general, dissident, and political prisoner
- Josef Bursik (footballer) (born 2000), English footballer
