= Karel Kutlvašr =

Czechoslovak legionary officer and general

General of the Army Karel Kutlvašr
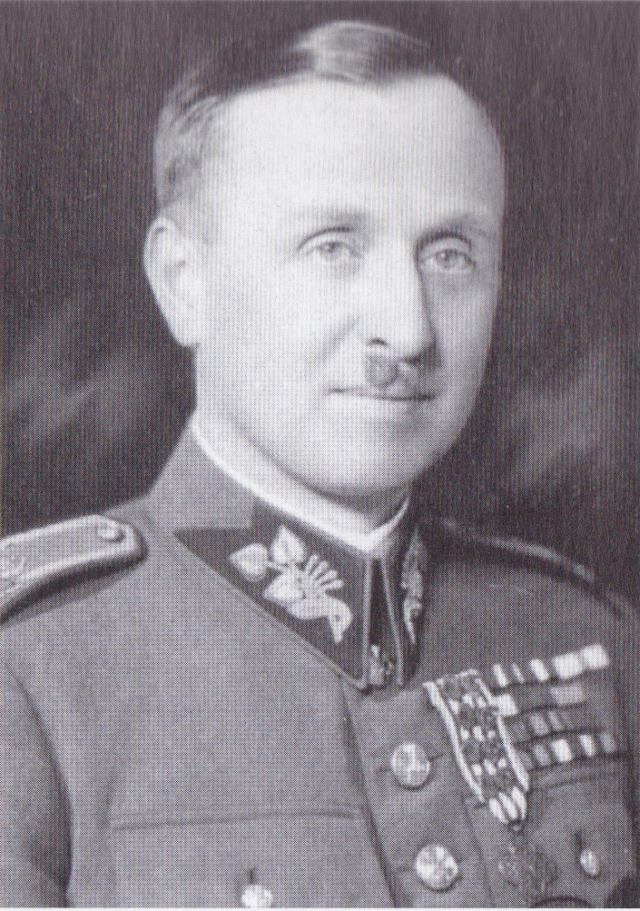

2nd Minister of War of Czechoslovakia
- In office 4 May 1919 – Unknown
- President: Tomáš Garrigue Masaryk
- Prime Minister: Karel Kramář
- Preceded by: Milan Rastislav Štefánik
- Succeeded by: Unknown

Personal details
- Born: 27 January 1895 Michalovice, Bohemia, Austria-Hungary
- Died: 2 October 1961 (aged 66) Prague, Czechoslovakia

Military service
- Allegiance: Russian Empire; Czechoslovakia
- Branch: Czechoslovak Legion; Czechoslovak Army
- Years of service: 1914–1948
- Rank: General of the Army
- Battles/wars: World War I; Battle of Zboriv (WIA); Battle of Bakhmach; Russian Civil War; Simbirsk Operation; Kazan Operation; Syzran-Samara Operation; World War II; Prague Uprising

Karel Kutlvašr (27 January 1895 – 2 October 1961) was a Czechoslovak legionary officer and general who commanded the Prague Uprising. After February 1948 became a victim of political persecution by the communist regime of Czechoslovakia.

== Biography ==
Karel Kutlvašr was born on 27 January 1895 in Michalovice near Havlíčkův Brod as the sixth child in the family of farmer Josef Kutlvašr. He graduated from the school Německý Brod in 1911 with a two-year business degree. He was first employed by Jenč in Humpolec. He later worked in Kyiv as a clerk for Vielwart and Dědina, which exported agricultural machinery to Tsarist Russia.

In August 1914, he was among the first to enlist in the Czech companies (Note: He participated together with his older brother František, who later fell near Zborov.) Kutlvašr founded units of the future Czechoslovak legions on the Battle of Galicia. As a scout, he participated in a number of important battles. He was honored many times for his heroism in battle. After the Battle of Zborov, in which he was wounded, he became battalion commander and assistant commander of the 1st MS. Rifle Regiment which was primarily commanded by Colonel Švec. With him, he also participated in the Kazan Operation on 6–7 August 1918. After the foundation of the First Czechoslovak Republic, he became the interim commander of the regiment, and on 25 February 1919 he was promoted to Minister of War, replacing Milan Rastislav Štefánik. Kutlvašr was promoted to lieutenant colonel and subsequently appointed the final commander of the 1st Regiment. In Russia, he met Elizabeth Yakovlev, whom he later married.

He returned to his homeland in 1920, and here he was promoted to colonel in 1923, when he served as commander of the 1st Infantry Regiment in České Budějovice. Between 1923 and 1931 he commanded the 2nd Infantry Brigade in Chomutov. In 1928 he was promoted to brigadier general. At the age of 33, he became one of the youngest generals of the Czechoslovak Army and gradually held a number of command and pedagogical positions. From 1934 to 1939 he commanded the 4th Infantry Division in Hradec Králové and at the time of the mobilization in September 1938 he took command of Border Area 35 with the headquarters in Vamberk.

During the occupation, he was a member of the resistance organization Defense of the Nation. Under the Prague Uprising general František Slunečko ("Alex") was, on 5 May 1945, appointed commander of rebel troops in Prague, and, together with representatives of the Czech National Council later in the afternoon on 8 May, negotiated the conditions for implementing the surrender of German troops in Prague (Note: With the German Instrument of Surrender on all fronts was, with the participation of the Soviet deputy General Susloparov, signed in Reims on 7 May at 02:41 (with final effect at 23:01 on 8 May 1945), but the Soviet Union did not do so until late. on the evening of 8 May, due to formal shortcomings, he refused to recognize, and Wehrmacht units on the Eastern Front led by Marshal Schörner also refused to submit to it. The "Protocol on the Form of Surrender of the German Armed Forces" thus negotiated the cessation of fighting by German troops against the Czechoslovak insurgent forces and specified the conditions for their departure into captivity to the west.) exchange for their free passage through the city into captivity by the armed forces of the Western Allies. This took place after February 1948 and it probably became one of the reasons for his persecution by the communist regime, carried out at the request of the Soviet Union, which already in the summer of 1945 began to put pressure on his retirement.

He served as the military commander of Prague until 28 May 1945, when he became the interim commander of the 5th Corps in Brno, but on 1 August 1945, after complaints from Soviet envoy Valerian Zorin, he was sent on vacation, during which his fate was decided.

He returned into service, after the intervention of President Edvard Beneš, and returned in February 1946 when he joined as commander of III. Corps in Plzeň, and after being promoted to the rank of divisional general later served from 1947 as deputy commander of Military Area 3 again in Brno.

Shortly after the 1948 Czechoslovak coup d'état, on 8 March 1948, he was sent on vacation and transferred to retirement on 1 June 1948. He was subsequently arrested on 18 December 1948 and, as a representative of the alleged resistance group "Truth Prevails", which was staged provocations 5th Department, (Note: In some sources it is possible to find information that it was Defense Intelligence, but its name was changed to the 5th Department of the General Staff on 1 April 1946.) in a show trial on 16 May 1949 the State Court in Prague sentenced for high treason and sentenced to prison freedom for life and at the same time degradation to a soldier in reserve. He was imprisoned in Mírov and Leopoldov. (Note: Here was one of his fellow prisoners Rudolf Toussaint, in 1945 the German commanding general in Prague and his opponent from the fighting during the Prague Uprising.) In 1960, after the amnesty of the President of the Republic Antonín Novotný, announced on the occasion of the adoption of the Socialist Constitution, more precisely, the "completion of socialism" and the change of the name of the republic from Czechoslovak Republic to Czechoslovak Socialist Republic, he was released from serving his sentence. He returned from prison in very poor health.

After his release from prison, he lived with his wife until his death in Prague-Vršovice, Rybalkova 69. As he was awarded a retirement pension of only CSK 230 per month, he made a living first as a security guard in the Prague Castle Riding School and after having to leave, he worked as a night porter in the Nusle Brewery. He died suddenly during a medical examination on 2 October 1961 in the Motol University Hospital in the office of doctor MUDr. Endta, whose father fought by his side in the Czechoslovak legions.

In 1968, the Municipal Court in Prague overturned all charges from 1948 and 1949. However, it was not fully rehabilitated until after November 1989. In memoriam he was promoted to General of the Army and was awarded the Milan Rastislav Stefanik Order.

On 28 October 2017 the President of the Republic, Miloš Zeman, awarded him in memoriam the Order of the White Lion of the 1st Class Military Group for extraordinary merits for the defense and security of the state.

== Awards ==
- Czechoslovak War Cross 1918
- Order of the Falcon, with swords
- Czechoslovak Revolutionary Medal
- Czechoslovak Medal of Victory
- Czechoslovak War Cross 1939–1945
- Milan Rastislav Stefanik Order, II class
- Order of the White Lion, I Class

=== Foreign Awards ===
- France: Legion of Honour
- France: Croix de Guerre
- Russia: Order of St. George, IV Class
- Russia: Order of Saint Anna, III Class with swords and bow
- Russia: Order of Saint Stanislaus
- Romania: Order of the Star of Romania, II Class with Swords
- United Kingdom: Distinguished Service Order
