= Lev Prchala =

Czech military officer (1892–1963)

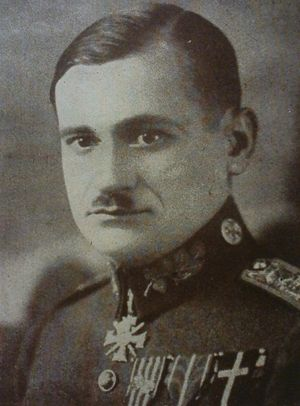
- Lev Prchala
- Born: 23 March 1892; Slezská Ostrava, Austria-Hungary
- Died: 11 June 1963 (aged 71); Feldbach, Austria
- Military career
- Allegiance: Czechoslovakia
- Rank: Army General (Czechoslovakia)
- Conflicts: World War I

Lev Prchala (23 March 1892 – 11 June 1963) was a Czech military officer, legionary commander during World War I, general of the Czechoslovak Army, minister of the Voloshyn's autonomous government of Carpathian Ruthenia in 1939, commander of the Czechoslovak Legion in Poland during the German invasion of Poland and anti-communist politician in exile during the Cold War.

== Decorations ==
Medal for Bravery, Small
Medal for Bravery, Large
Military Merit Cross, 3rd Class
Order of St. Vladimir, 4th Class with Swords and Ribbon
Order of the Falcon (Czechoslovakia)
Croix de Guerre
Czechoslovak War Cross 1918
Distinguished Service Order
Legion of Honour, 4th Class Officer
Legion of Honour, 5th Class Chevalier
War Merit Cross (Italy)
Order of Lāčplēsis, 2nd class
World War I Victory Medal (Czechoslovak)
Medal of the Revolution of Czechoslovakia
Order of the Crown, 2nd Class (Grand Officer)
Order of the Star of Romania, 2nd Class with Swords
Order of the White Eagle, 2nd Class
Cross of Valour (Poland)
Greek Medal of Military Merit of 1917
