= Lutopecny =

- Municipality
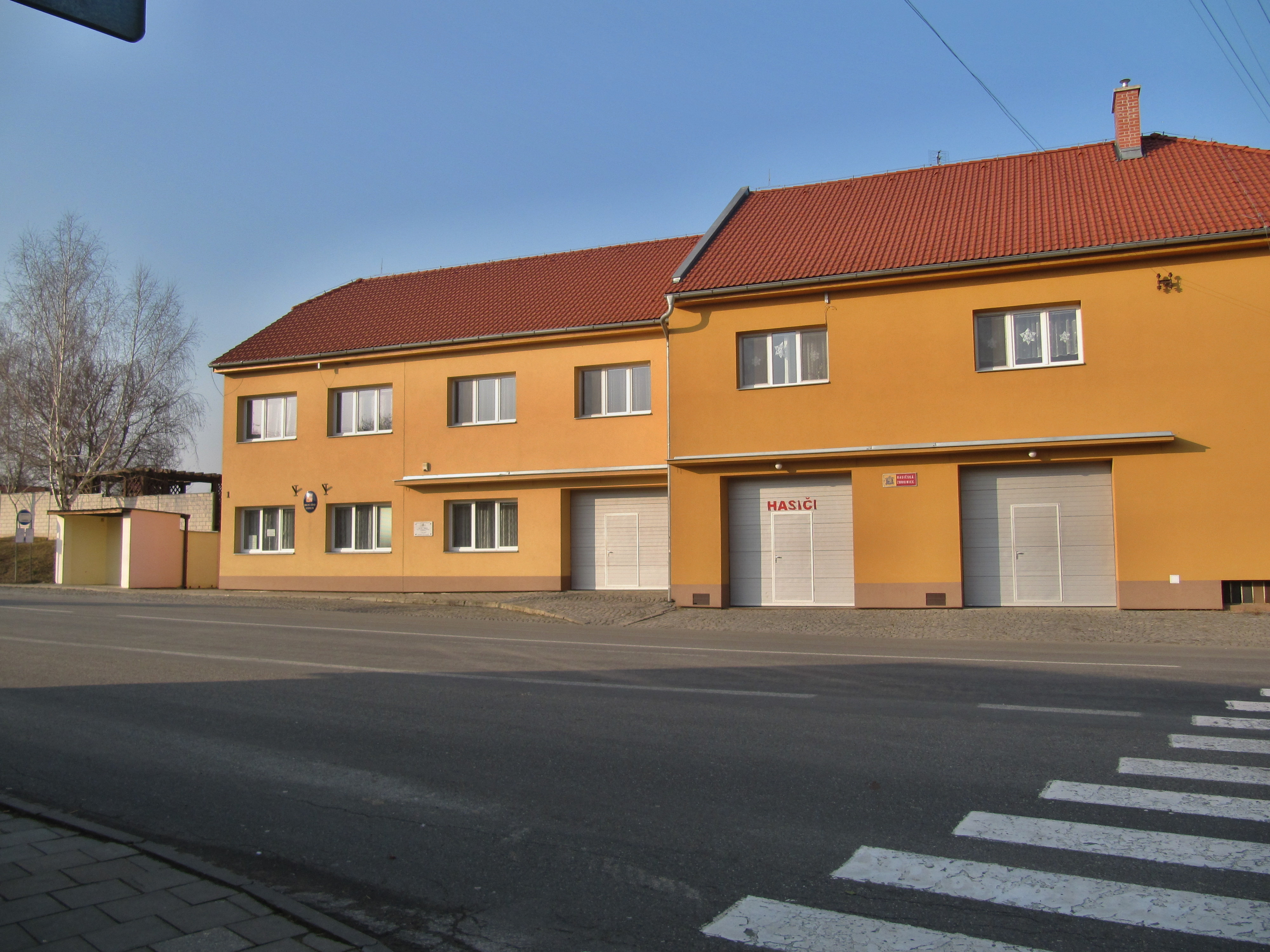
- Municipal office

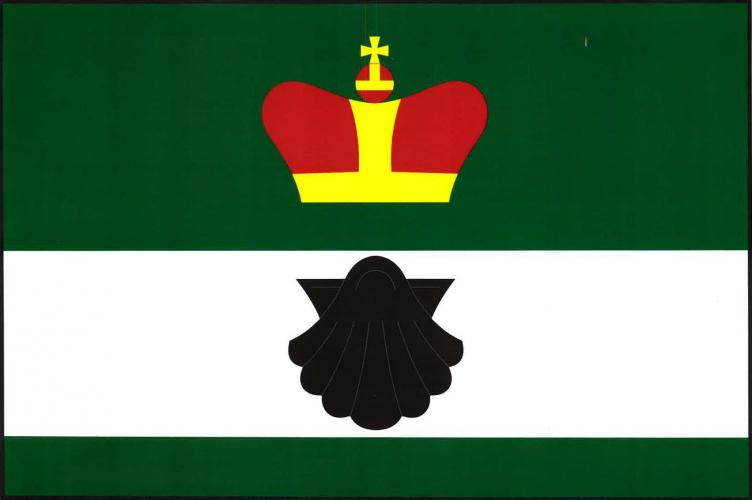
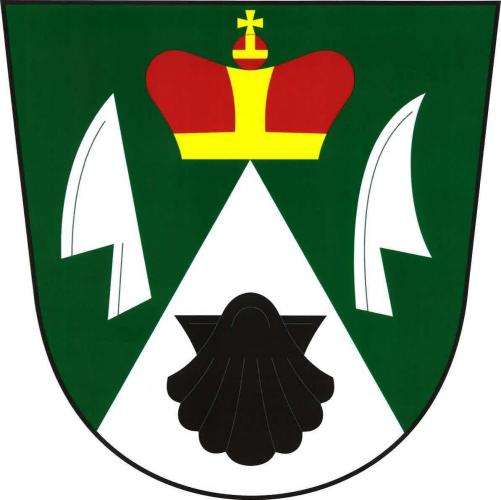
- Flag Coat of arms

- Location in the Czech Republic
- Coordinates: 49°18′5″N 17°20′40″E
- Country: Czech Republic
- Region: Zlín
- District: Kroměříž
- First mentioned: 1290

Area
  - Total: 4.87 km^{2} (1.88 sq mi)
- Elevation: 214 m (702 ft)

Population (2026-01-01)
  - Total: 615
  - Density: 126/km^{2} (327/sq mi)
- Time zone: UTC+1 (CET)
  - Summer (DST): UTC+2 (CEST)
- Postal code: 767 01
- Website: www.lutopecny.cz

Lutopecny is a municipality and village in Kroměříž District in the Zlín Region of the Czech Republic. It has about 600 inhabitants.

Lutopecny lies approximately 4 kilometres (2 mi) west of Kroměříž, 25 km (16 mi) west of Zlín, and 228 km (142 mi) south-east of Prague.

== Administrative division ==
Lutopecny consists of two municipal parts (in brackets population according to the 2021 census):

- Lutopecny (372)
- Měrůtky (182)

== Demographics ==
Historical population
Year	Pop.	±%
1869	533	—
1880	655	+22.9%
1890	623	−4.9%
1900	698	+12.0%
1910	814	+16.6%
1921	753	−7.5%
1930	728	−3.3%
1950	715	−1.8%
1961	697	−2.5%
1970	674	−3.3%
1980	594	−11.9%
1991	536	−9.8%
2001	555	+3.5%
2011	580	+4.5%
2021	554	−4.5%
Source: Censuses

== Notable people ==
- Alois Šiška (1914–2003), World War II pilot
