= Heliodor Píka =

Czechoslovak army officer

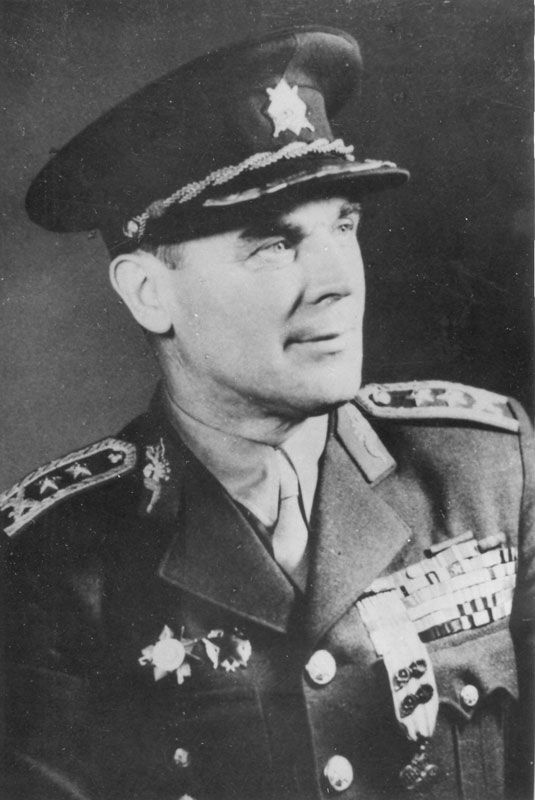
- Born: 3 July 1897; Štítina, Austrian Silesia, Austria-Hungary
- Died: 21 June 1949 (aged 51) Plzeň, Czechoslovakia
- Allegiance: Czechoslovakia
- Branch: Czechoslovak Legions; French Army; Czechoslovak Army
- Service years: ≈34
- Rank: General (promoted posthumously)
- Commands: Chief of mission to the USSR; Deputy chief of the general staff of the Czechoslovak Army
- Awards: Milan Rastislav Stefanik Order, 3rd class Order of the White Double Cross, 1st Class

General Heliodor Píka (3 July 1897 – 21 June 1949) was a Czechoslovak army officer who was the first victim of judicial murder of the Czechoslovak Communist show trials.

== Early life ==
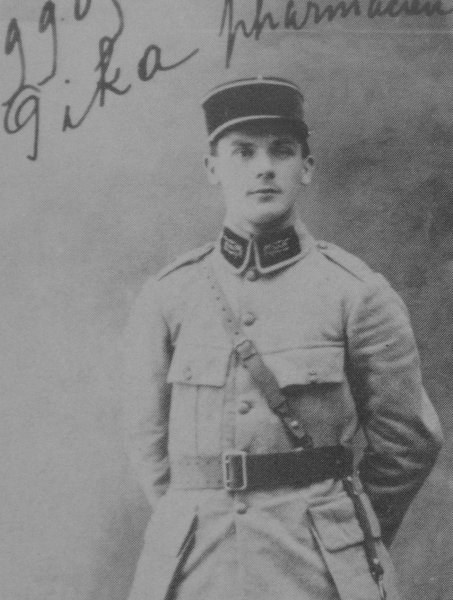
Píka as a young legionnaire.

Heliodor Píka was born in a village of Štítina in Austrian Silesia, near Opava, then Austria-Hungary. During World War I, Píka served as a Czechoslovak legionnaire in the Russian theatres. He was captured at Berestechko on 5 October 1916, during the Russian campaign but by 1917 he had returned to duty as a member of the French Army and would later serve with the Czechoslovak Legions in France. By 1920, when the Legion was disbanded, Píka had risen to the rank of lieutenant. After the war, Píka studied at a French military academy, graduating in 1920.. An elementary school in his birth village (Štítina) was later named after him.

== Service in the Czechoslovak Army ==
In the 1930s, Píka acted as a military attaché to Romania and Turkey. In 1938, in a bid to prevent the occupying German forces from using Czechoslovak Army matériel, he disposed of it by selling arms to the militant Haganah organization in Palestine. (Selling arms to non-state actors was forbidden by international conventions but the Czechoslovak foreign affairs department granted its approval.) He would later travel to the Balkans, from where he arranged defections of Czechoslovaks and Hungarians from German-occupied territory.

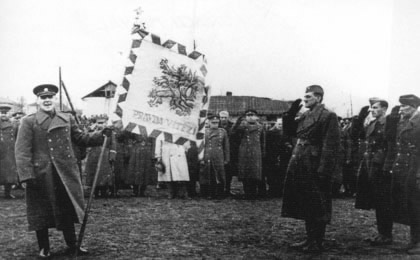
Brigadier General Heliodor Píka holds the battle flag of the Czechoslovak 2nd Airborne Brigade.

In 1941, during World War II, Píka was appointed chief of the Czechoslovak Military Mission to the Soviet Union (in Moscow). Loyal to the London-based government of exiled Czechoslovak President Edvard Beneš, Píka supported their democratic policies despite Soviet opposition. Píka was under constant pressure from the Soviets to betray Beneš, but despite attempts at blackmail, Píka remained loyal throughout his tenure, which lasted until 1945.

Following the war, Beneš promoted Píka to deputy chief of the general staff of the Czechoslovak Army, where he was responsible for the arms industry. He held this position until late February 1948, when he was dismissed from the Army on the orders of Rudolf Slánský, with the assistance of Army Security Intelligence Office (known as (Czech: Obranné zpravodajství), (OBZ) its Czech abbreviation) chief Bedřich Reicin (the former head of Czechoslovak military intelligence, who held a grudge against Píka from the time in which they served together in the USSR).

== Charges of high treason ==
In early May 1948 (after the Communist coup of February 1948), Heliodor Píka was arrested without a warrant and accused of espionage and high treason. The Czechoslovak authorities forged a memorandum that purported to link General Píka to British military intelligence. (Historian Edward Crankshaw noted that the document, written in broken English, was "the most appalling and most unimaginably inefficient bit of forgery [he had] ever come across". (Note: The entire memorandum was reproduced by Milan Hauner in Crime and Punishment in Prague: The Strange Case of Karel Vaš and Gen. Heliodor Píka.)) Despite the inadequacy of the memorandum, Píka was held through 1948 and interrogated by NKVD-trained officers of the OBZ.

Reicin appointed Karel Vaš as chief investigator in the Píka case. Reicin would later, in a departure from standard practice, name Vaš the second prosecutor at Píka's trial. According to Reicin's secretary, Vaš told Reicin: "[j]ust tell me how much you need for Píka, fifteen years or the gallows, and the indictment can be manufactured accordingly...."

From 26 to 29 January 1949, Píka was tried in secret before the Military Senate of the State Court in Prague. (This court was specially created as an instrument of political repression in mid-1948.) Charged with high treason, damaging the interests of the Czechoslovak Republic and the Soviet Union, and undermining the ability of the state to defend itself, Píka was not allowed to present a defence, and no witnesses were called. Píka was sentenced to death. He unsuccessfully appealed to the Supreme Court. Píka and his lawyer asked President Klement Gottwald (leader of the communist government) for clemency but this effort was unsuccessful.

Heliodor Píka was hanged in the yard of Bory Prison (Czech: Věznice Bory) in Plzeň around 06:00 on the morning of 21 June 1949. In a farewell letter to his family, written the night before his execution, he wrote: "I am sure that this is not a judicial error but a political murder". Offered the chance to express his last wishes as he stood at the gallows, he said: "my ultimate desire is that the nation remain united, and that everyone, without regard for their differences, work toward the unity of our people". He was the first of more than 200 Czechoslovaks tried and executed for political reasons by the communist government of Czechoslovakia. His body was never found.

== Aftermath ==
The day after Píka's conviction, Reicin, writing under a pseudonym in the Czechoslovak Army's newspaper, published a series of articles casting a politico-ideological slant upon the Píka affair. Reicin's articles were soon republished in a widely circulated pamphlet entitled "A Path That Leads to the Depths of Treason".

During the Prague Spring of 1968, Píka's case was reopened at the request of Milan Píka (son of Heliodor) and the elder Píka's lawyer, and a military tribunal declared Heliodor Píka innocent of all charges. Milan Píka died in March 2019. He had become a general in both the Czech and Slovak armies – the only person in history ever to do so.

In 2001, Karel Vaš was indicted by the Czech police's State Office of Investigation on charges of having knowingly used false evidence, falsifying a confession, exceeding his powers and using psychological violence during the Píka affair. These counts would carry a maximum sentence of 15 years in prison.

In June 2001, after a trial before the Senate of the Prague City Court, the eighty-five-year-old Vaš was found guilty of introducing false documents and statements, and sentenced to seven years' imprisonment. Both Vaš and his attorney maintained Vaš's innocence, and promised to appeal.

== Honours ==
The Czechoslovak government conferred the Milan Rastislav Stefanik Order, 3rd class upon Píka in 1991.

On 1 September 2004, Píka was awarded the highest Slovak decoration, the Order of the White Double Cross, 1st Class. (Píka was the first, and as of 2010, the only recipient of the military version of this award.)

Píka earned several French medals for his military service as a Legionnaire in France during the First World War. He was also the recipient of many Soviet, American and British military decorations. A street in Prague 6 (Dejvice) was renamed in his honor in 1990 (Generála Píky).

In 1992, Píka was posthumously promoted to the rank of general. Following the conviction of Vaš, on 21 June 2001 a ceremony was held at Czech Army headquarters in Prague to confer full military honours upon Píka.
