= Štítina =

- Municipality
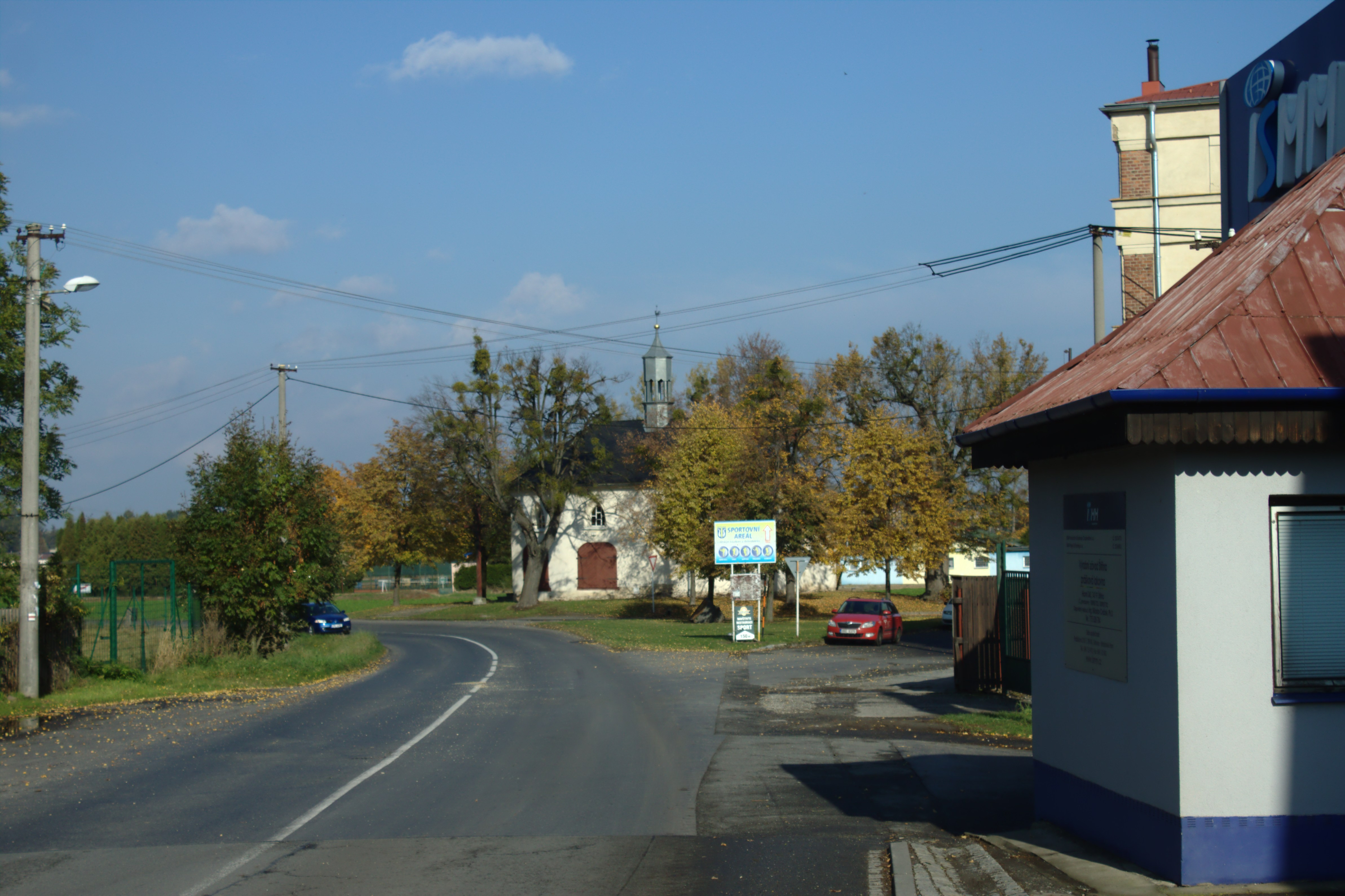
- Main road and the Chapel of Mary Magdalene

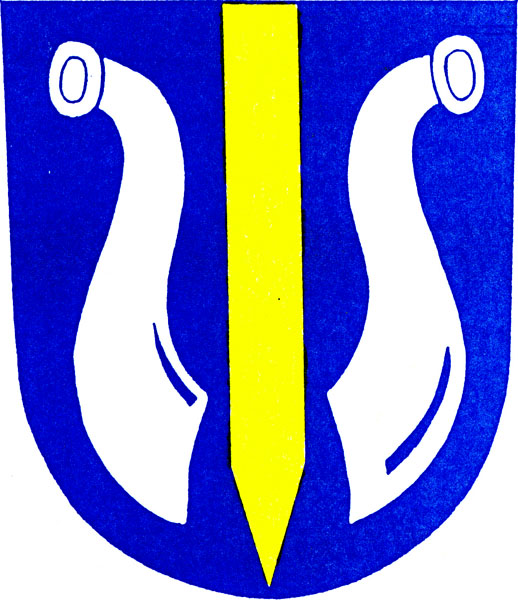
- Flag Coat of arms

- Location in the Czech Republic
- Coordinates: 49°54′53″N 18°0′45″E
- Country: Czech Republic
- Region: Moravian-Silesian
- District: Opava
- First mentioned: 1282

Area
  - Total: 3.06 km^{2} (1.18 sq mi)
- Elevation: 238 m (781 ft)

Population (2026-01-01)
  - Total: 1,281
  - Density: 419/km^{2} (1,080/sq mi)
- Time zone: UTC+1 (CET)
  - Summer (DST): UTC+2 (CEST)
- Postal code: 747 91
- Website: www.stitina.cz

Štítina (German: Stettin) is a municipality and village in Opava District in the Moravian-Silesian Region of the Czech Republic. It has about 1,300 inhabitants.

== Geography ==
Štítina is located about 7 kilometres (4 mi) southeast of Opava and 17 km (11 mi) northwest from Ostrava. It lies in an agricultural landscape in the Opava Hilly Land. The Opava River flows along the northern municipal border; a branch of the Opava River flows through the village. The Sedlinka Stream flows through the southern part of Štítina.

== History ==
The first written mention of Štítina is from 1282, when there was a fortress called Štítina with a settlement called Troubky. The original fortress built by the lords of Benešov was rebuilt into a moated Renaissance castle in the second half of the 16th century. In the 18th century, the village began to be called Štítina. From 1837 Štítina was owned by the Teutonic Order. In 1785, the castle was turned into a brewery and in the 1980s, the tumbledown building was eventually demolished.

At the end of World War II, the village was badly damaged.

== Demographics ==
Historical population

Year	Pop.	±%
1869	524	—
1880	542	+3.4%
1890	586	+8.1%
1900	587	+0.2%
1910	770	+31.2%

Year	Pop.	±%
1921	721	−6.4%
1930	1,079	+49.7%
1950	818	−24.2%
1961	1,031	+26.0%
1970	1,004	−2.6%

Year	Pop.	±%
1980	1,085	+8.1%
1991	1,164	+7.3%
2001	1,180	+1.4%
2011	1,181	+0.1%
2021	1,265	+7.1%

Source: Censuses

== Transport ==
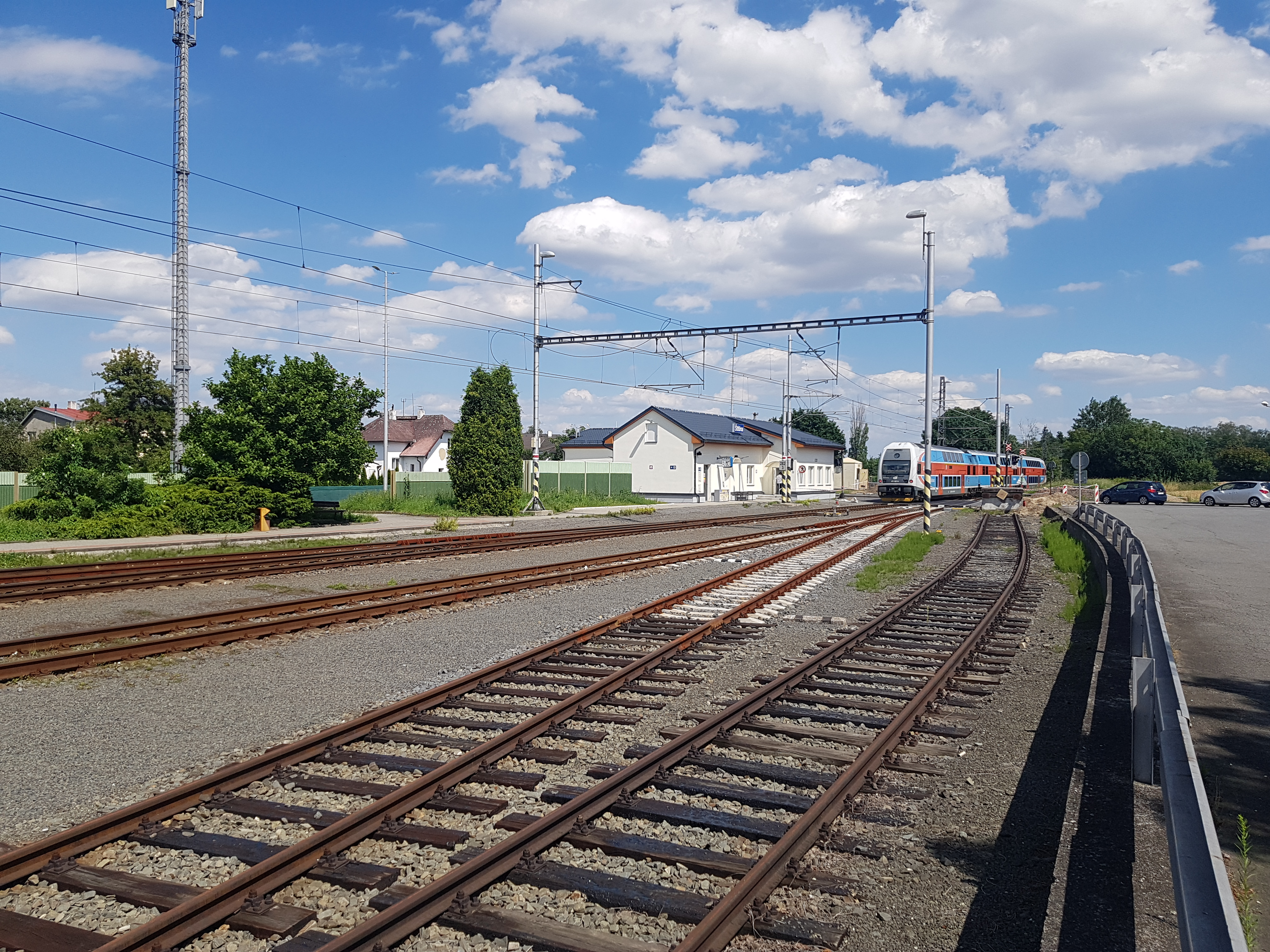
Train station

Štítina is located on the railway line Ostrava–Opava.

== Sights ==
The most important monument is the Chapel of Saint Mary Magdalene. It is a Renaissance chapel from the 16th century, unique for this region.

== Notable people ==
- Heliodor Píka (1897–1949), general executed by the Communists after a show trial
