= Michalovice (Havlíčkův Brod District) =

- Municipality
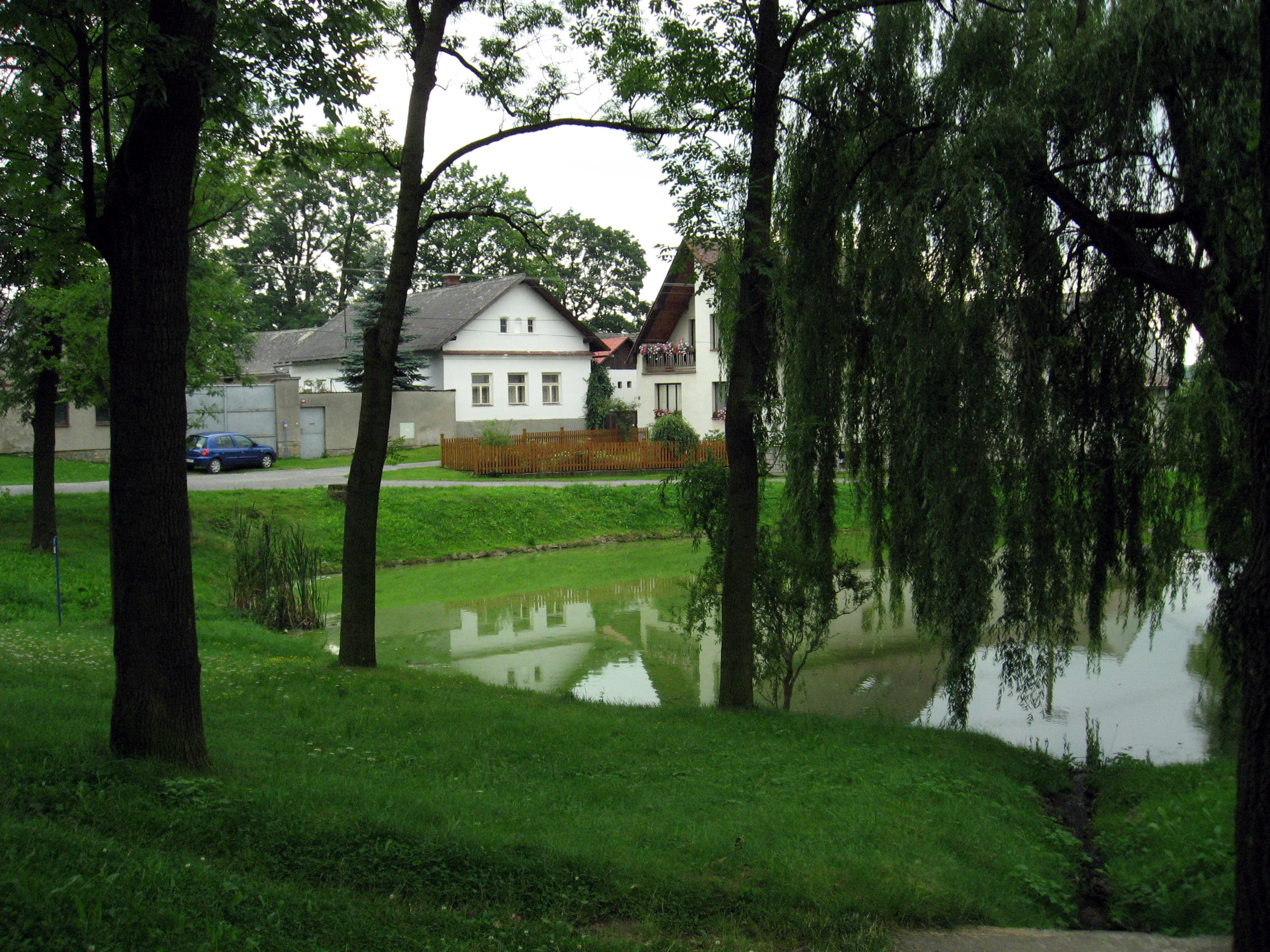
- Centre of Michalovice

- Flag Coat of arms

- Location in the Czech Republic
- Coordinates: 49°34′37″N 15°31′28″E
- Country: Czech Republic
- Region: Vysočina
- District: Havlíčkův Brod
- First mentioned: 1377

Area
  - Total: 4.09 km^{2} (1.58 sq mi)
- Elevation: 481 m (1,578 ft)

Population (2026-01-01)
  - Total: 225
  - Density: 55.0/km^{2} (142/sq mi)
- Time zone: UTC+1 (CET)
  - Summer (DST): UTC+2 (CEST)
- Postal code: 580 01
- Website: www.obecmichalovice.cz

Michalovice is a municipality and village in Havlíčkův Brod District in the Vysočina Region of the Czech Republic. It has about 200 inhabitants.

Michalovice lies approximately 5 kilometres (3 mi) south-west of Havlíčkův Brod, 21 km (13 mi) north of Jihlava, and 98 km (61 mi) south-east of Prague.

== History ==
The first written mention of Michalovice is from 1377.

== Demographics ==
Historical population
| Year | Pop. | ±% |
|---|---|---|
| 1869 | 183 | — |
| 1880 | 220 | +20.2% |
| 1890 | 206 | −6.4% |
| 1900 | 215 | +4.4% |
| 1910 | 234 | +8.8% |
| 1921 | 223 | −4.7% |
| 1930 | 199 | −10.8% |
| 1950 | 175 | −12.1% |
| 1961 | 168 | −4.0% |
| 1970 | 158 | −6.0% |
| 1980 | 139 | −12.0% |
| 1991 | 123 | −11.5% |
| 2001 | 129 | +4.9% |
| 2011 | 166 | +28.7% |
| 2021 | 224 | +34.9% |
Source: Censuses

== Notable people ==
- Karel Kutlvašr (1895–1961), military leader
