= Josef Buršík =

Czech resistance fighter, general, dissident, and political prisoner (1911–2002)

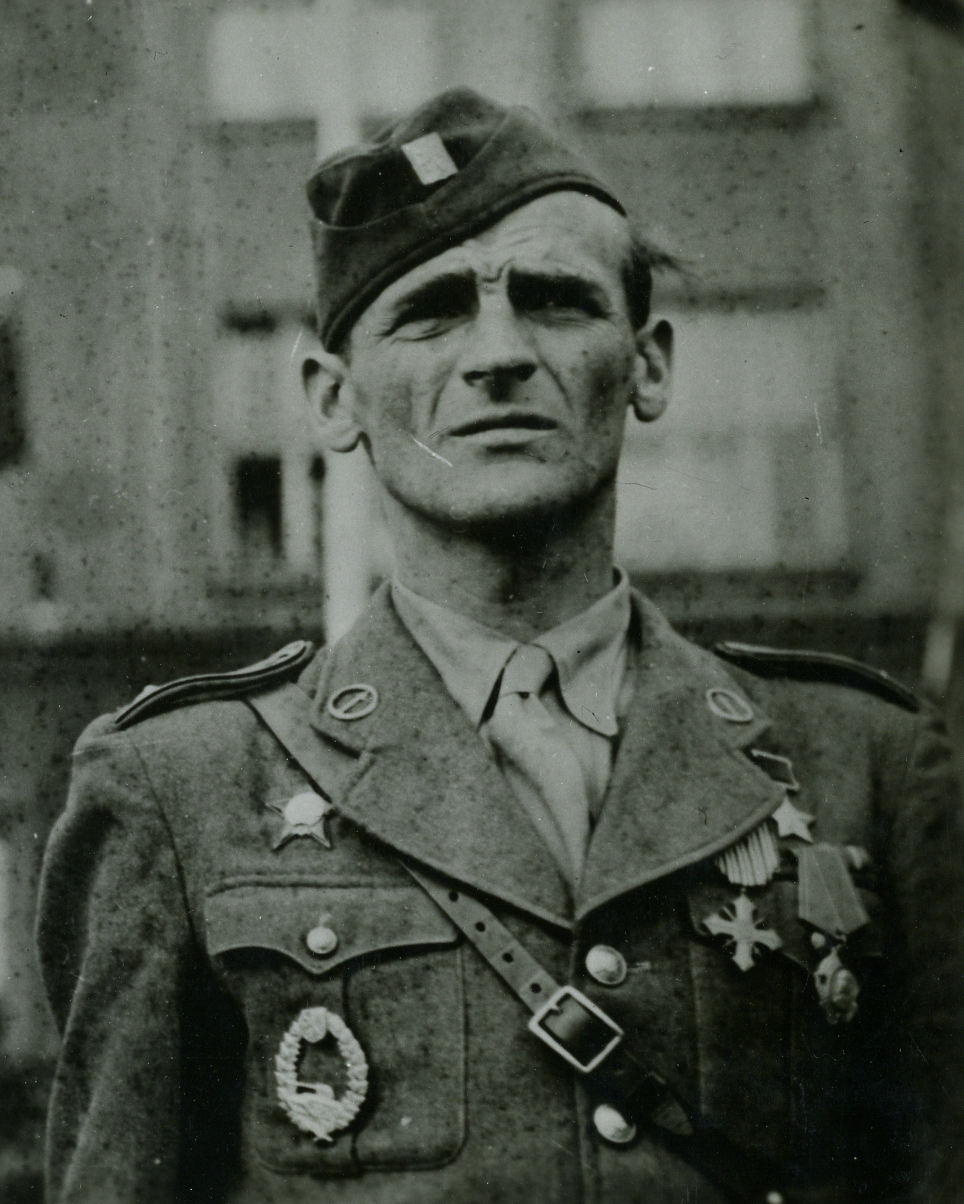
Josef Buršík (1945)

Josef Buršík (11 September 1911 – 30 June 2002) was a Czech resistance fighter, general, dissident, and political prisoner. During World War II, while fighting with the First Czechoslovak Independent Field Battalion (1. československý samostatný polní prapor), later reorganized as the First Czechoslovak Independent Brigade (1. československá samostatná brigáda) he was awarded the Gold Medal of the Hero of the Soviet Union.

After the war Buršík was persecuted by the communist authorities in Czechoslovakia. He was imprisoned and stripped of all his wartime decorations, except for the Hero of the Soviet Union award. Buršík managed to escape and made his way to the west. He lived first in West Germany, then the United Kingdom. He was active in organizations working to help Czech and Slovak refugees. His memoirs "No pity for sacrifice" (Nelituj oběti) were published in 1992.

After the Soviet invasion of Czechoslovakia in the spring of 1968 Buršík returned his Hero of the Soviet Union medal in protest. Despite ongoing health problems in his later years, he lived until the fall of communism in Czechoslovakia (later the Czech Republic) and was officially "rehabilitated" and given an honorary promotion to the rank of Major General in the Czech Army. He was also awarded the Order of the White Lion and the Milan Rastislav Stefanik Order.

He died in 2002 in Northampton, England and was buried with full military honours. His grandson of the same name is a professional footballer.

== Biography ==
Buršík was born in Postřekov in the Chodsko region in Bohemia, at the time a part of the Austro-Hungarian Empire. In the interwar period he became an officer in the Czechoslovak Army.

== World War II ==
After the Munich Agreement, the German occupation of Czechoslovakia and the establishment of the Nazi client state, the Slovak Republic, about four thousand Czech and Slovak soldiers and officers left their countries and went into exile in Poland. In April 1939, in cooperation with Polish authorities, they formed the "Czechoslovak Foreign Group", later in the year transformed into the Czech and Slovak Legion. Josef Buršík joined the legion while it was being organized in Bronowice Małe (presently part of Kraków)

During the Nazi invasion of Poland the Czech and Slovak Legion fought alongside the Poles against the Germans. Buršík took part in defense of Tarnopol (today Ternopil, Ukraine). The Soviet Union invaded Poland on 17 September in fulfillment of Stalin's agreement with Hitler (Molotov–Ribbentrop Pact). Buršík and his unit were captured and imprisoned by the Soviets.

In 1942 Buršík joined the Soviet organized First Czechoslovak Independent Field Battalion, under the command of Ludvík Svoboda. He started with a rank of corporal and was promoted to Warrant Officer. The battalion first saw combat in the Battle of Sokolovo in March 1943, and Buršík was wounded during the fighting. During the Battle of Kiev Buršík was one of the first to make it to the center of the city, for which he was awarded the Gold Star of the Hero of the Soviet Union in December 1943. The Czechoslovak battalion, later increased to size of brigade and later whole army corps, continued fighting on the Eastern Front until the end of the war. Buršík finished the war with the rank of captain.

== After the war ==
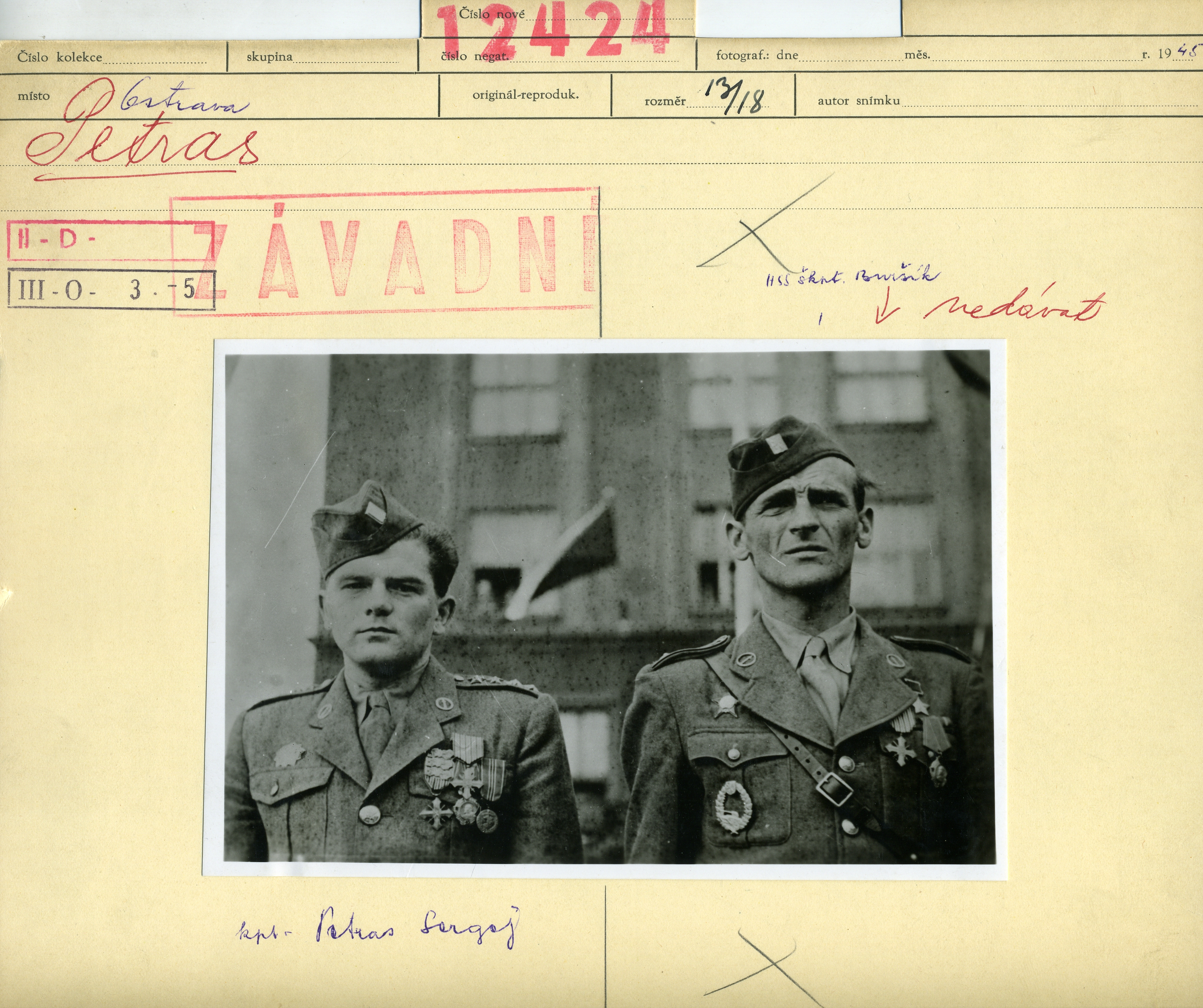
Card with photos of Capt. Sergei Petras and Capt. Josef Buršík. Photograph taken during a military parade in Ostrava, in 1945.

In Czechoslovakia, after recovering from tuberculosis, Buršík was given command of a tank brigade based in Ostrava. In 1949 he left the Czechoslovak Army. Shortly afterwards he was arrested for his anti-communist views and charged with treason. He was sentenced to ten years in prison, with an extra four added after he tried to appeal the verdict. He was also stripped of all his military decorations except for the Hero of the Soviet Union medal.

Because of his bad health Buršík was transferred to a hospital in Olomouc from which he managed to escape and make his way across the border to Bavaria. He continued to live in the Federal Republic of Germany where he helped Czech refugees by working with the American Fund for Czechoslovak Refugees and cooperating with the Czech Intelligence Office. Subsequently, he moved to England in 1955. His grandson, Josef Bursik, is an English professional footballer.
