= Karel Janoušek =

Czechoslovak Air Force officer (1893–1971)

Karel Janoušek, KCB
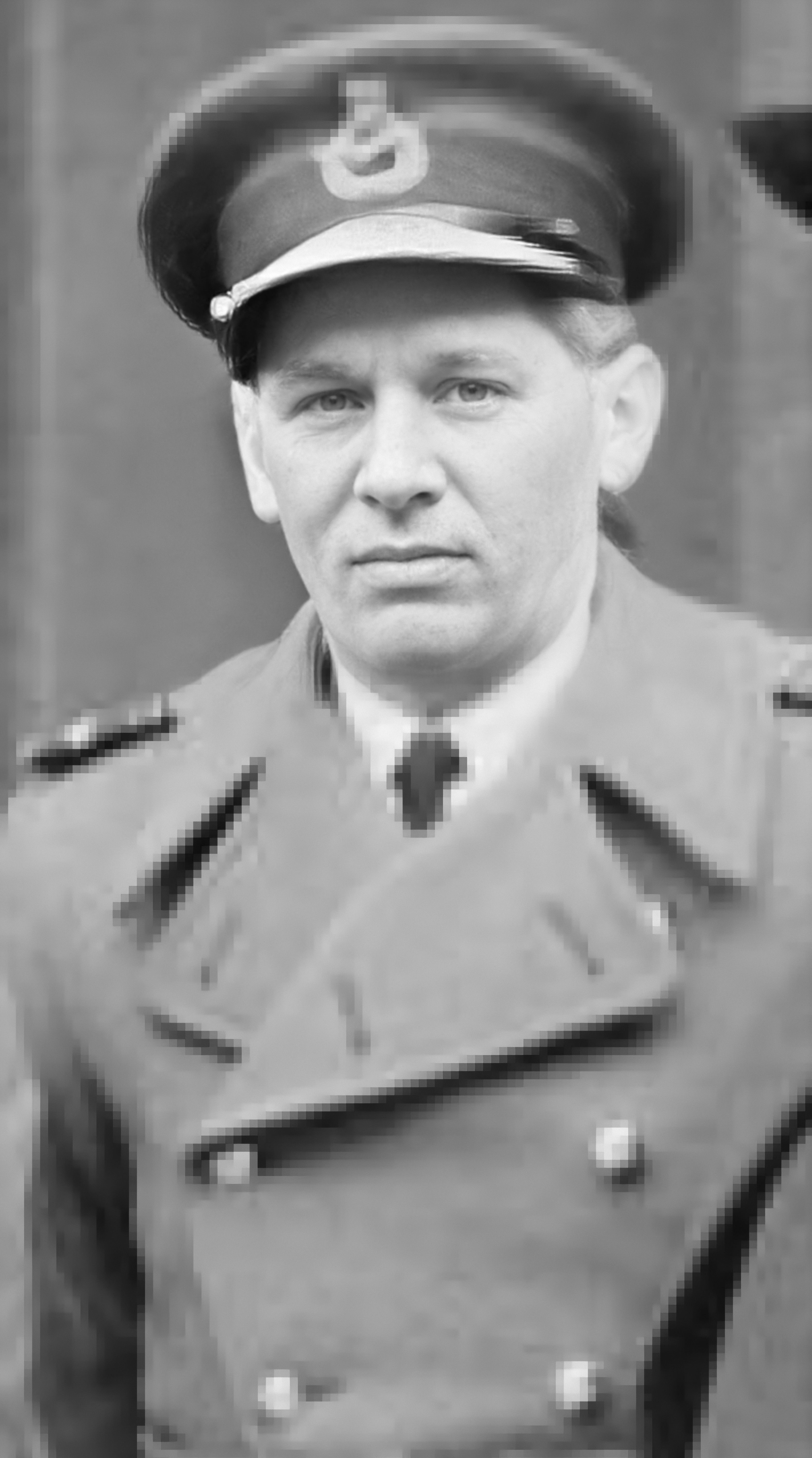
- Karel Janoušek in the Second World War.
- Born: 30 October 1893; Přerov, Austria-Hungary
- Died: 27 October 1971 (aged 77); Prague, Czechoslovakia
- Burial place: Libeň Cemetery, Prague (1971–2014); Šárka Cemetery, Prague (2014–)
- Spouse(s): Anna Steinbachová (killed in Auschwitz)
- Military career
- Allegiance: Austria-Hungary Serbia; Russia; Czechoslovakia; France; United Kingdom Czechoslovakia
- Branch: Imperial-Royal Landwehr; Czechoslovak Legion; Czechoslovak Army; Czechoslovak Air Force; Armée de l'Air; Royal Air Force Volunteer Reserve
- Service years: 1915–45
- Rank: Air Marshal
- Commands: 7 Coy, II Bn, 1st Regt Czechoslovak Legion 3 Coy, 1st Regt Czechoslovak Legion; 2nd Infantry Regt, Czechoslovak Army; 6th Flying Regiment, Czechoslovak Air Force; Provincial Commander, Czechoslovak Air Force; 3rd (Air) Dept, Czechoslovak Military Administration (CsVS, in exile); Inspector General of the RAF's Czechoslovak squadrons Interim Inspector of Air Defence
- Conflicts: World War I; Sixth Battle of the Isonzo; Battle of Zborov; Russian Civil War; Revolt of the Czechoslovak Legion; World War II; Battle of France; Battle of Britain
- Awards: Doctor of natural sciences; Order of the White Lion First Class (posthumous); Milan Rastislav Stefanik Order Second Class (posthumous); Czechoslovak War Cross 1918; Czechoslovak War Cross 1939–1945; Československá medaile Za chrabrost před nepřítelem; Československá medaile za zásluhy, 1. stupně; Knight Commander of the Bath; Commandeur de la Légion d'honneur; Croix de Guerre 1914–18; Croix de Guerre 1939–45; Commander of the Legion of Merit; Commander of the Order of Polonia Restituta

Karel Janoušek, KCB (30 October 1893 – 27 October 1971) was a senior Czechoslovak Air Force officer. He began his career as a soldier, serving in the Austrian Imperial-Royal Landwehr (1915–16), Czechoslovak Legion (1916–20) and Czechoslovak Army (1920–24).

In 1924 Janoušek transferred to the Czechoslovak Air Force and in 1926 he qualified as an aircraft pilot. In 1930 he co-wrote a textbook on aerial warfare tactics. In the 1930s he was a staff officer. From 1936 he studied meteorology and geophysics at the Charles University and in 1939 he was awarded a doctorate in natural sciences (RNDr).

In the Second World War Janoušek escaped first to France and then the United Kingdom. In the UK he commanded the RAF's Czechoslovak squadrons, was knighted by HM King George VI and ultimately promoted to Air Marshal. In occupied Czechoslovakia the Nazis retaliated against Janoušek's Free Czechoslovak service by jailing his wife and much of their family.

In 1945 Janoušek returned to Czechoslovakia, where he found his wife and several of their relatives had died in imprisonment. He was sidelined by the increasingly pro-Communist commanders of the Czechoslovak Air Force. After the 1948 Czechoslovak coup d'état Janoušek was court-martialled, sentenced to 18 years in prison and stripped of his rank, doctorate and awards. In 1949 his sentence was extended to 19 years. In 1950 it was extended to life imprisonment for a separate offence, but in 1955 this sentence was shortened to 25 years.

In 1956 Janoušek' sentences were reduced and in 1960 he was released in a Presidential amnesty. A military tribunal cancelled his convictions in the Prague Spring in 1968. Janoušek died in Prague in 1971. He was not fully rehabilitated until after the 1989 Velvet Revolution ended the Communist dictatorship.

== Early life ==
Janoušek was born in Přerov, Moravia, the second child of a clerk on the Imperial Royal Austrian State Railways. His father, also called Karel Janoušek, was a founding member of the Czech Social Democratic Party. Janoušek's mother, Adelheid, died when Janoušek was two years old. His father remarried and had another nine children by his second wife, Božena.

Janoušek completed secondary school in 1912 and then went to a German business school. He spent the first three years of his working life as a clerk in a local business that belonged to a distant relative.

In June 1915 Janoušek was conscripted into the Austrian Imperial-Royal Landwehr, trained at Opava in Czech Silesia and was promoted to corporal. He served in the 57th Infantry Regiment and fought in the Sixth Battle of the Isonzo on the Italian Front.

Janoušek was then transferred to the Eastern Front to resist the Russian Brusilov Offensive. Russian forces captured him on 2 July 1916 and detained him in a prisoner-of-war camp near Kiev, Ukraine. However, on 1 August 1916 Janoušek was released to join the II Volunteer Division of the Serbian Army in Odessa, which recognised his Austrian rank of corporal.

=== Czechoslovak Legion 1916–20 ===
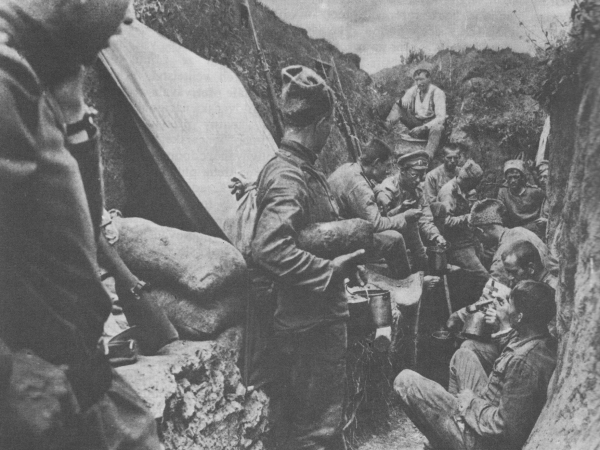
Members of Janoušek's 7th Company in a trench at Zborov in July 1917

On 14 October 1916 Janoušek transferred to the Czechoslovak Legion as a private and joined its 1st Rifle Regiment at Boryspil. In 1917 after the February Revolution the Czechoslovak Legion became part of the Russian 7th Army. Janoušek fought at the Battle of Zborov on 1–2 July 1917. He was wounded on 18 July, in hospital until August and then promoted to warrant officer.

After the October Revolution the Czechoslovak Legion suffered internal strife between pro- and anti-Bolshevik factions. Janoušek was in the anti-Bolshevik faction, which ultimately won. The Legion disobeyed Edvard Beneš' order to surrender "rebels" to the Bolsheviks, and in October 1918 Janoušek was promoted to interim commander of the 7th Company of the II Battalion of the 1st Regiment.

The Legion joined one of the White Armies in the Russian Civil War. Janoušek fought in battles against the Red Army at Bugulma, Melekess, Braudina, Simbirsk and Kazan. On 7 August 1918 he took command of the 3rd Company of the 1st Regiment. In September the Red Army forced the Legion to retreat from Kazan. In October Czechoslovakia declared independence from Austria-Hungary, and in November the First World War ended with the armistices of Villa Giusti and Compiègne. But the Czechoslovak Legion was trapped in Russia, with the Red Army blocking its escape to the west.

The Legion therefore fought its way east across Siberia to Vladivostok to be evacuated by sea. At Tayshet in May 1919 it defended the Trans-Siberian Railway from a Red Army attack. Janoušek was wounded again and treated in hospital in Irkutsk until the end of June. On 25 May France, one of the interventionist powers, awarded him the Croix de Guerre with palm leaf. Janoušek's company set off for Vladivostok on 10 October 1919. On 6 December the unit sailed from Vladivostok aboard a Japanese steamship, the Yonan Maru. Janoušek and his unit finally reached Prague on 2 February 1920.

== Czechoslovakia 1920–39 ==
=== Czechoslovak Army 1920–24 ===
The Czechoslovak Legion formed the basis of the new Czechoslovak Army. In May 1920 Janoušek took command of the 2nd Infantry Regiment at Dobšiná in Slovakia and on 1 July he was made Second in Command of the XXII Brigade at Košice. On 21 February 1921 he was promoted to staff captain and given command of the 12th Artillery Regiment at Uzhhorod in Carpathian Ruthenia, but in October he was transferred to a desk job in Košice.

In September 1923 Janoušek graduated from War College. He was briefly stationed at the Provincial Headquarters in Prague, but then in February 1924 started training at Cheb in Bohemia to become a pilot.

=== Czechoslovak Air Force 1924–39 ===
In January 1925 Janoušek was appointed Commander of the Xth Air Reconnaissance Course. On 19 November 1925 he married Anna Steinbachová, née Hoffmannová. On 1 January 1926 he qualified as a pilot. He was not an outstanding pilot, but he was good at reconnaissance, air navigation and meteorology. On 2 December 1926 he was promoted to major of the General Staff. In September 1927 he went on a one-month attachment to the French Armée de l'Air. On 28 February 1928 he was promoted to lieutenant colonel. By now he was Second in Command of the Military Flying School. He co-authored a book on aerial warfare tactics, inspired by the ideas of the Italian military theorist Giulio Douhet, which was published in May 1930.

Janoušek was then posted to Slovakia and, on 31 December 1930, promoted to command the 6th Flying Regiment. In 1930–32 his duties also included training officers to be higher commanders. On 31 July 1933 he was promoted to full colonel. By 1936 he was a brigadier general and a Provincial Commander of the Air Force. Bad weather was a major limitation on aviation, and caused about half of all air accidents. Therefore, in 1936 Janoušek started studying meteorology and geophysics at the Charles University in Prague.

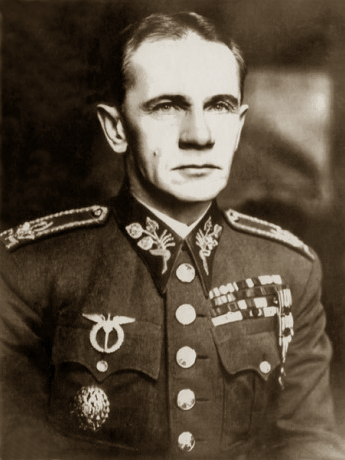
General Sergei Wojciechowski, commander of the Czechoslovak 1st Army

During the Sudeten Crisis Czechoslovakia ordered a partial mobilization on 21 May and complete mobilization on 23 September. Janoušek commanded the Air Force of General Sergei Wojciechowski's 1st Army, which was to protect the frontier with Nazi Germany from České Budějovice in the southwest to Králíky in the north. But on 29 September France and the United Kingdom signed the Munich Agreement with Germany, forcing Czechoslovakia to cede the Sudetenland without a fight.

On 15 March 1939 Germany occupied Czechoslovakia and created the Protectorate of Bohemia and Moravia, which was required to dissolve its army and air force. Nevertheless, Janoušek completed his course at Charles University and graduated with a doctorate in natural sciences (RNDr) on 23 June.

Hundreds of Czechoslovak army and air force personnel responded to the German occupation by escaping to Poland or France. The secret Obrana národa Czechoslovak resistance organisation helped Janoušek to cross into Slovakia on 15 November 1939. From there he travelled via Hungary, Yugoslavia, Greece and Beirut in French-ruled Lebanon to reach France.

== Second World War ==
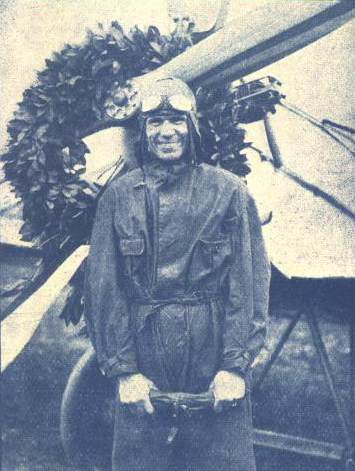
Alois Vicherek as a record-breaking pilot in 1928

=== France 1939–40 ===
Janoušek reported for duty in Paris on 1 December 1939. He was assigned to the Czechoslovak Military Administration (CsVS) as Head of the 3rd (Air) Department, de facto commanding the free Czechoslovak Air Force being formed in France, for which there were agreements between the French and Free Czechoslovak governments. But turning the force into a reality was hampered by inaction of the French Ministry of Aviation, lack of equipment, and Czechoslovak air force personnel being scattered at more than 20 locations in France and the French Empire. On 15 March 1940 Janoušek was replaced by his senior and rival, Brig Gen Alois Vicherek.

Janoušek was then to command a Czechoslovak Air Force training centre, which was to be built at Cognac in western France. It never materialised. On 10 May Germany invaded the Netherlands, Belgium and France. As French armed forces were collapsing, on 18 June Janoušek and a large group of Czechoslovak airmen left Bordeaux aboard a small Dutch ship, the Karanan, which reached Falmouth in England on 21 June. The next day France capitulated to Germany.

=== United Kingdom 1940–45 ===
On 21 June, the day before France capitulated, the former Czechoslovak ambassador to the UK Jan Masaryk was reported as stating that Czechoslovakia "now has 1,500 young, trained pilots in England ready for service with the Allied air forces". However, Brig Gen Vicherek was stuck in France until 27 June and did not reach Britain until 7 July. Hence for a fortnight Janoušek was the most senior Czechoslovak Air force officer in the United Kingdom.

There was not yet a military agreement between the Czechoslovak government-in-exile and the UK, but Janoušek secured the help of the UK's former air attaché to Prague, Wg Cdr Frank Beaumont. It was agreed that all Czechoslovak airmen could enlist in the RAF Volunteer Reserve and that air force units of Czechoslovak personnel would be formed under RAF command. An Inspectorate of Czechoslovak Air Force was formed on 12 July 1940. The UK War Department gave Janoušek the rank of Air Commodore, effectively giving him oversight of all Czechoslovak units of the RAF.

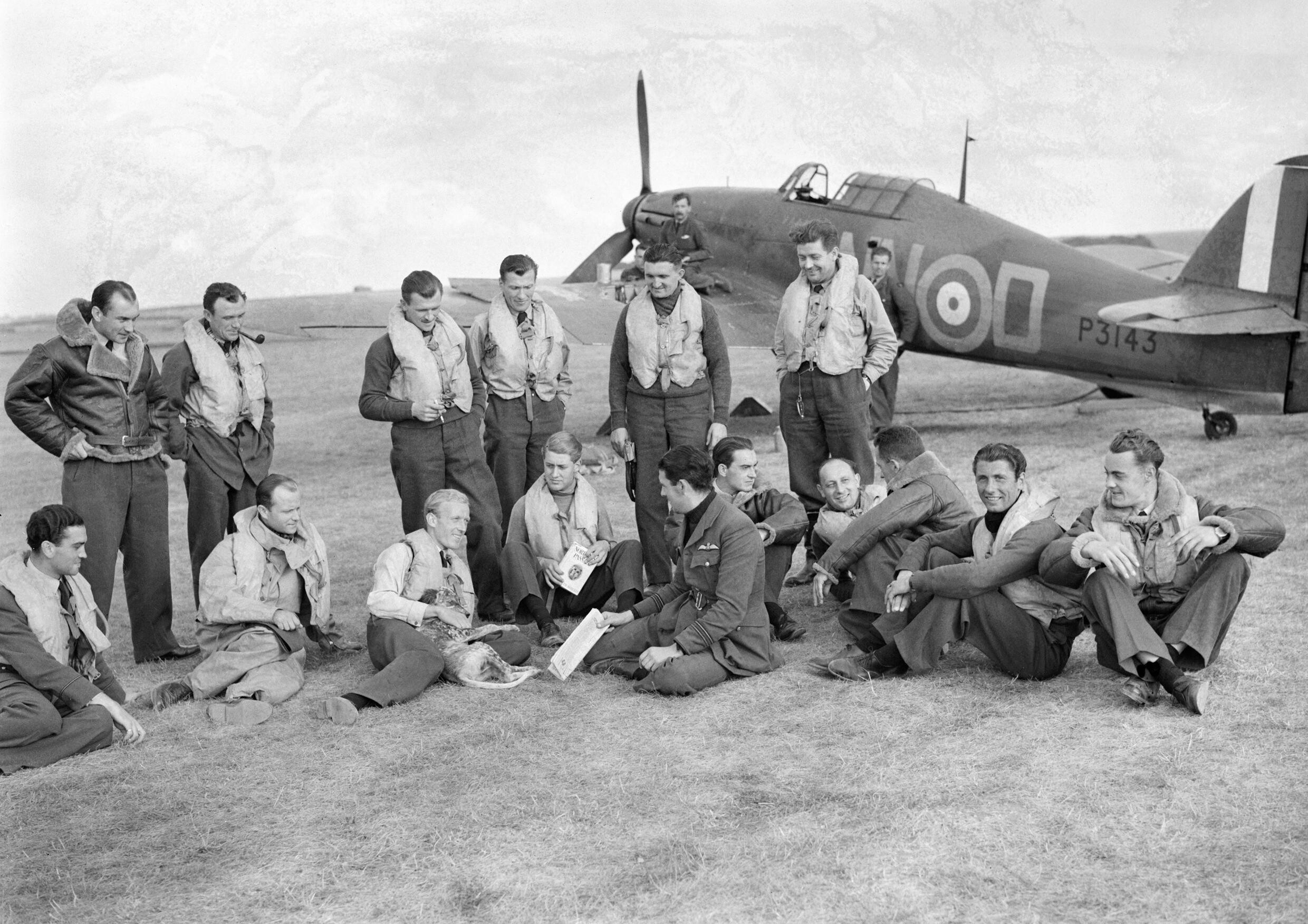
Czechoslovak fighter pilots of No. 310 Squadron RAF in front of a Hawker Hurricane at RAF Duxford in September 1940

However, the Defence Ministry of the Czechoslovak government-in-exile did not confirm Janoušek's appointment until 15 October 1940, followed by a Presidential Decree to the same effect on 18 June 1941. Both President Beneš and his Defence Minister, Brig Gen Sergej Ingr, criticised Janoušek for securing an agreement that excluded the government-in-exile from any control over Czechoslovak units and personnel in the RAF. It also excluded Brig Gen Vicherek from the chain of command. But it also ensured that the RAF enlisted, trained and equipped 88 Czechoslovak fighter pilots in time for them to fight in the Battle of Britain, including No. 310 Squadron RAF which was the RAF's first squadron formed almost entirely of Czechoslovak personnel.

As Inspector of the Czechoslovak Air Force, Janoušek too was outside the RAF's immediate chain of command. His job was to inspect the RAF's Czechoslovak squadrons, organise training, propose which Czechoslovak officers should be promoted to command those squadrons, and have meetings with the President Beneš and Defence Minister Ingr. In the course of the war the Air Force Inspectorate expanded to include other functions including medical, transport and pastoral services. For a time Janoušek's chief of staff was Wg Cdr Josef Schejbal, who in 1941 commanded No. 311 Squadron RAF, the RAF's only Czechoslovak heavy bomber squadron.

By May 1941 the RAF had up to 1,600 Czechoslovak personnel. Nos. 310, 311, 312 and 313 Squadrons were almost entirely Czechoslovak, as was one flight of 68 Squadron. There were also numerous Czechoslovak personnel serving in other RAF units.

On 31 December 1940 the New Year Honours list announced that Janoušek was to be made a Knight Commander of the Order of the Bath (KCB). HM King George VI knighted him at Buckingham Palace on 20 May 1941. The BBC broadcaster John Snagge interviewed Janoušek for The World Goes By programme, which was broadcast on the BBC Home Service on 8 July 1941 and the BBC Forces Programme two days later. Janoušek told BBC listeners:

BBC broadcaster John Snagge, who interviewed Janoušek in 1941

This anniversary gives me a welcome opportunity to say thank you to Britain and the British people...
The kindness of your RAF officers and men, and indeed of everybody here, has strengthened our souls to carry on. We have been here one short year. The qualities which make life worth living – liberty, decency, kindness and common sense – they are so evident here and more than ever we realise their value. May I thank you on behalf of our Air Force for the privilege of sharing these things with you. May this next year bring us nearer to victory over the enemy – the enemy not only of (the) British or Czechoslovaks or of any other people, but the enemy of all good.

By July 1941 Janoušek was an Air Vice-Marshal. His duties as Inspector took him everywhere that Czechoslovak RAF personnel served or trained, including Canada, the US and The Bahamas. He was a delegate to the December 1944 Chicago Convention on International Civil Aviation that led to the creation of the International Civil Aviation Organization. On 17 May 1945 Janoušek was promoted to Air Marshal.

Janoušek wrote a booklet in English, The Czechoslovak Air Force. It is undated but seems to have been published before the end of 1942. In it he summarises the history of the force from the foundation of Czechoslovakia in 1918 to the escape of Czechoslovak airmen from 1938 onward, the formation of free Czechoslovak air units in France in 1939 and Britain in 1940.

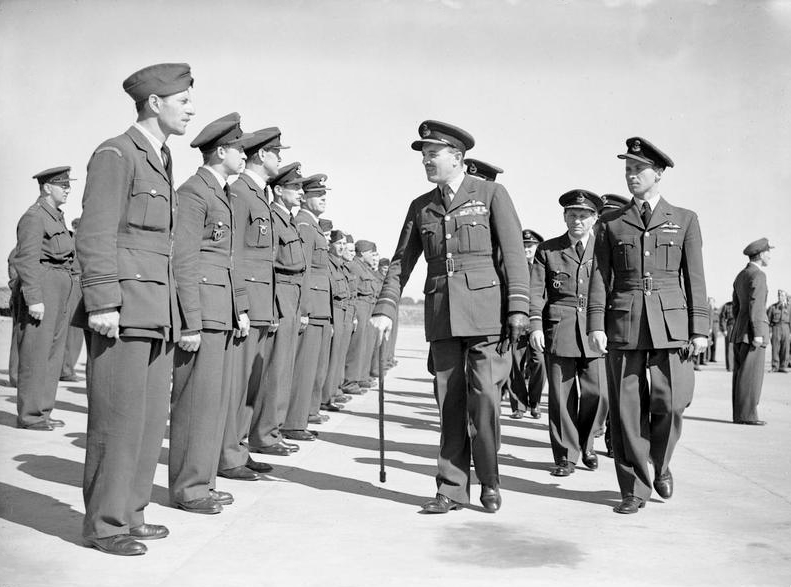
Farewell parade of Czechoslovak squadrons at RAF Manston, Kent, on 3 August 1945. Air Marshal John Slessor, with walking stick, inspects some of the men. Air Marshal Janoušek can be seen behind him.

In May 1945 the Second World War in Europe ended, and in August the RAF's Czechoslovak squadrons relocated to Ruzyně Airport, Prague. On 3 August they held a farewell parade at RAF Manston in Kent, where Air Marshal John Slessor inspected them. The next day Janoušek gave a farewell broadcast on the BBC Home Service. He told listeners:

Now that the time has come for us to leave this charming and hospitable land, where we have shared with you the joys and sorrows during the past five years of our common struggle; I would like to express to the British people on behalf of myself and of all Czechoslovak Air Force officers and men, our deepest gratitude for all the kindness they have at all times so readily shown us and for making us feel so much at home...

...we are departing with mixed feelings, for there are very few of us in the Czechoslovak Air Force whose families escaped persecution and often death at the hands of the Germans, a price our dear ones had to pay because their sons had taken up arms against the enemies of human freedom... In fact there will be many of us who will have no home to go to and no parents or relatives left alive...

Although we are leaving you we all hope most sincerely that the bonds of friendship forged between our two nations as a result of our happen association with the Royal Air Force, which will always be one of our most treasured memories, will not only remain a solid link unifying our two peoples but will strengthen even further in the days of peace.

== Czechoslovakia 1945–71 ==
Janoušek himself returned to Czechoslovakia on 13 August 1945. In six years of occupation the Nazis had jailed most of his family. His wife Anna and one of his sisters had been murdered in Auschwitz. One of his brothers had been murdered in Buchenwald. Two of his brothers-in-law had also died in jail: one in Litoměřice in Bohemia and the other in Pankrác Prison in Prague.

General Vicherek had been sent to the Soviet Union on 1 May and made Commander of the Czechoslovak Air Force on 29 May. On 19 October 1945 Janoušek's post of Inspector of the Air Force ceased to exist. The next day he accepted the post of Deputy Chief of the General Headquarters for Special Tasks. He followed his late father into the Czechoslovak Social Democratic Party. In January 1946 the Chief of the Staff of the Czechoslovak Armed Forces, General Bohumil Boček, appraised Janoušek as "lazy, insincere, and disgruntled".

Nevertheless, that spring Janoušek travelled to the UK to negotiate the purchase of UK and US materiél for the Czechoslovak Air Force. On 8 June 1946 he took part in a victory parade in London, and on 11 June he attended a Royal Garden Party hosted by HM King George VI. On 15 February 1947 Janoušek was appointed interim inspector of Air Defense by the General Staff. On 15 September he was a member of the Czechoslovak delegation at the seventh anniversary of the Battle of Britain.

But at the same time the Czechoslovak Communist Obranné zpravodajství (OBZ) military and political intelligence organisation was monitoring Janoušek's social life and visits to foreign embassies. On 15 October 1947 General Boček again appraised Janoušek, declaring "Janoušek is not suitable for a position in Command because of his attitude and therefore should only be employed in administration."

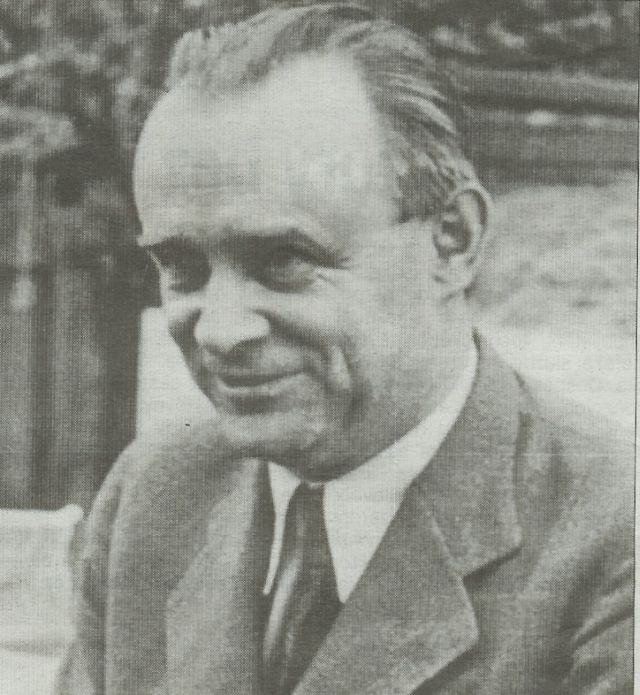
General František Moravec was among the senior military officers purged at the same time as Janoušek

In February 1948 the Communist Party of Czechoslovakia seized power. Three days later Boček ordered Janoušek, Brig Gen Alois Liška and military intelligence chief Gen František Moravec to take leave "for health reasons" pending a final decision about their future. In March Gen Šimon Drgáč personally told Janoušek there was no place for him under the Communist régime. Janoušek applied for a job at the International Civil Aviation Organization in Montreal, for which he had helped to lay the foundations at the 1944 Chicago conference. Dr Josef Dubský at the ICAO offered him a job, but Bedřich Reicin at the OBZ refused to let Janoušek leave Czechoslovakia.

=== Arrest, trial and political imprisonment ===
An OBZ double agent, Jaroslav Doubravský, lured Janoušek into trying to escape from Czechoslovakia. On 30 April 1948 Janoušek was arrested in the escape attempt, and on 2 May he was taken to an OBZ-controlled prison in the Hradčany district of Prague. A High Military Tribunal court-martialled Janoušek on 17 June and sentenced him to 18 years imprisonment. He was stripped of his air force rank, his university doctorate and his awards. On 30 December the tribunal rejected his claim of a mistrial but on 9 February 1949 Janoušek was retried and his sentence was increased to 19 years. He appealed, but on 26 May the appeal court confirmed his sentence.

Janoušek was imprisoned in Bory prison in Plzeň. There a prison guard approached him with an escape plan. Janoušek thought it was a trap and rejected the proposal. The guard was arrested in November 1949 and sentenced to life imprisonment. Janoušek and another political prisoner, Major René Černý, were accused of failing to report the escape proposal. In March 1950 they were tried and sentenced to life imprisonment. On 18 April the prison authorities announced that they had uncovered a plan for a prison uprising and mass escape. Černý, the ČSL politician Stanislav Broj and a guard were tried and executed and other prisoners were given long sentences. Janoušek was moved to a prison at Opava.

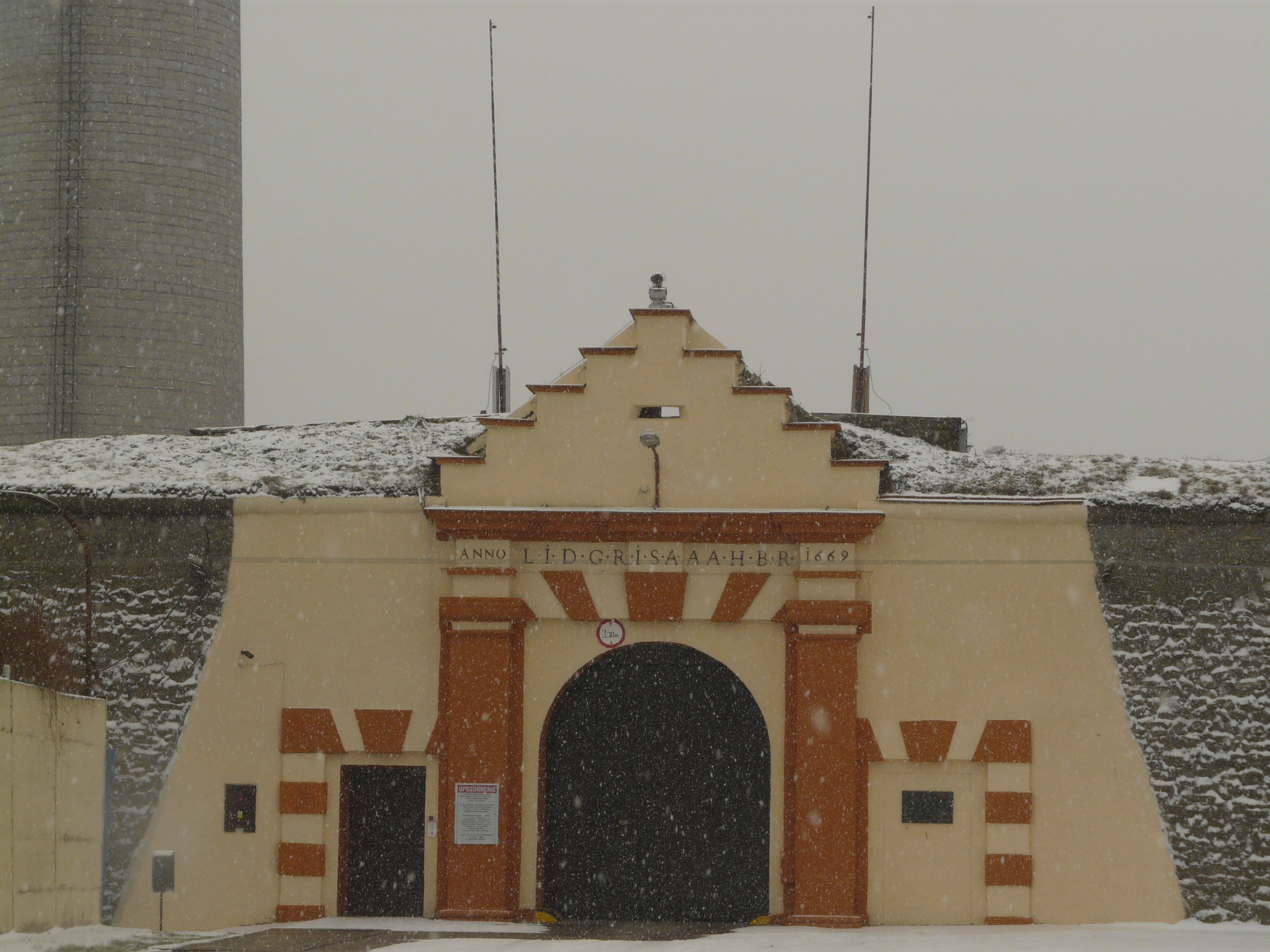
The entrance to Leopoldov Prison, where Janoušek served four of his 12 years' imprisonment

In June 1952 Janoušek was moved to Leopoldov Prison, a converted 17th-century fortress in Slovakia. In 1955 President Antonín Zápotocký granted a partial amnesty and Janoušek's life sentence was reduced to 25 years. In November 1956 he was moved again, to a prison at Ruzyně near Prague. Before the end of the year Janoušek's 25-year sentence was reduced to four years and his earlier 19-year sentence was reduced to 16 years.

=== Release, exoneration and death ===
In 1960, on the 15th anniversary of the liberation of Czechoslovakia, President Antonín Novotný granted an amnesty to many political prisoners. It included Janoušek, who was released on 9 May. All his property had been confiscated and he had only a small pension, so he took work as a clerk at a state enterprise in Prague. He worked until 1967, when he was 74 years old and could retire on a higher pension. On 5 July 1968, during the Prague Spring, a Higher Military Tribunal at Příbram in Bohemia cancelled Janoušek's convictions. Janoušek died on 27 October 1971, three days before what would have been his 78th birthday. He was buried in the Libeň suburb of Prague.

== Honours and monuments ==
=== Awards and decorations ===
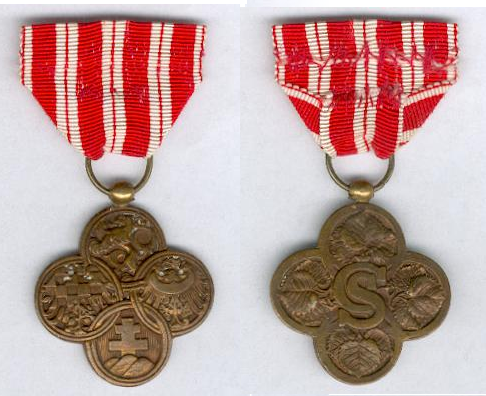
Janoušek was awarded the Czechoslovak War Cross 1918 for his service in the Czechoslovak Legion

Janoušek's Czechoslovak decorations included the Czechoslovak War Cross 1918, Czechoslovak War Cross 1939–1945, Československá medaile Za chrabrost před nepřítelem ("Bravery in Face of the Enemy") and Československá medaile za zásluhy, 1. stupně ("Medal of Merit, First Class"). In 2016 on Czech Independence Day, 28 October, the Czech Republic Posthumously awarded him the Order of the White Lion First Class. He has also been posthumously awarded the Milan Rastislav Stefanik Order Second Class.

In 1945 France made Janoušek a Commandeur de la Légion d'honneur. He also held the Croix de Guerre 1914–18 and Croix de Guerre 1939–45. In 1945 the USA made him a Commander of the Legion of Merit. Poland made him a Commander of the Order of Polonia Restituta. He was also awarded White Russian, Yugoslav, Romanian and Norwegian decorations.

=== Monuments and grave ===
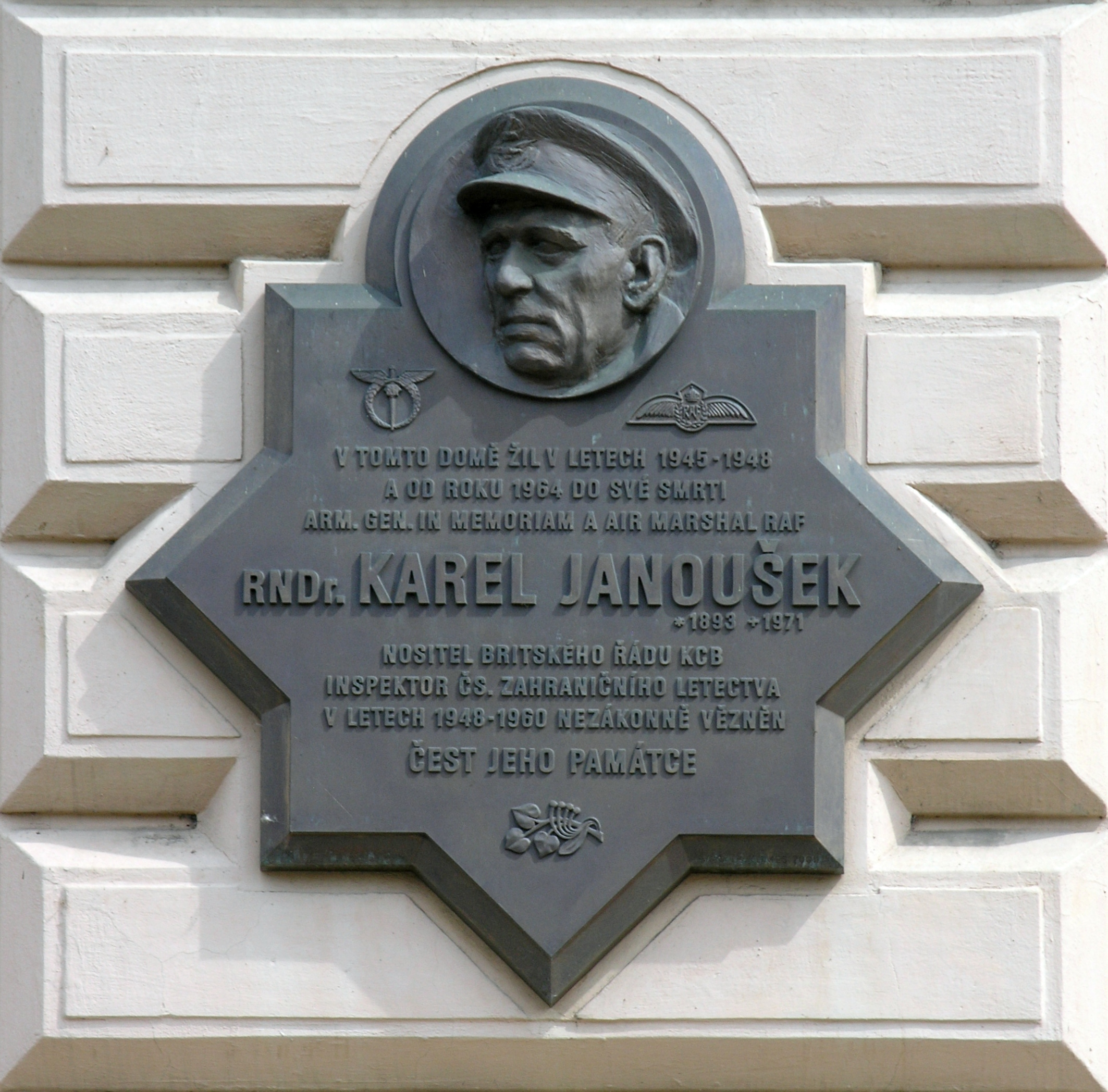
Plaque commemorating Janoušek in Ulice Železné lávky, Prague

There is a plaque in memory of Janoušek in Ulice Železné lávky in the Prague 1 district. A street in the Černý Most suburb of Prague is named "Generála Janouška" after him. In 2011 a European Military Rehabilitation Centre and Air Marshal Karel Janoušek Museum were established at Jemnice in Moravia. In the Czech Republic there is a General Janoušek Flying Club, which in October 2013 took part in commemorations of the 120th anniversary of Janoušek's birth.

In 2014 Janoušek's remains were exhumed from the Libeň Cemetery in Prague and on 12 May they were reinterred in the Šárka Cemetery.

Janoušek's life in the Second World War is the subject of Swedish power metal band Sabaton's song Far from the Fame, on their 2014 album Heroes.
