= Mikuláš Ferjenčík =

Slovak member of Czechoslovak national parliament, general and nation politician

General Mikuláš Ferjenčík

Director of the Czechoslovak National Council of America

Commissioner of the Interior of the Slovak Board of Commissioners
- In office 16 August 1946 – 26 February 1948
- Preceded by: Július Viktory
- Succeeded by: Daniel Okáli

Commissioner of Defence of the Slovak Board of Commissioners
- In office 1 September 1944 – 11 April 1945

Personal details
- Born: 6 December 1904 Polomka, Slovakia
- Died: 4 March 1988 (aged 83) Denver, Colorado, United States
- Spouse: Milada Ferjenčík

Military service
- Allegiance: Czechoslovakia
- Rank: Brigadier General
- Unit: Slovak Army Veterinary Service

Brigadier General Dr. Mikuláš Ferjenčík (6 December 1904 – 4 March 1988) was a Slovak military veterinarian, resistance fighter and exiled politician of Czechoslovakia. In 1992 he was posthumously promoted to the rank of General of the Army.

== Biography ==
Ferjenčík was born in Polomka, Slovakia (at the time a part of Austria-Hungary). He graduated from high school in Rožňava and the University of Veterinary and Pharmaceutical Sciences in Brno, before serving in the military veterinary service. By the outbreak of World War II he was chief of the Slovak Army Veterinary Service with the rank of lieutenant colonel. During the war he joined the Czechoslovak resistance and participated in the Slovak National Uprising as chief of staff to Ján Golian.

On 4 August 1944, Ferjenčík was part of a delegation from the Slovak National Council that flew to Moscow carrying detailed plans of their uprising against the Nazis. The papers were confiscated and he was held for a month before being released on 5 September and returning to Czechoslovakia.

After the war he was promoted to brigadier general. He then served on the Board of Commissioners in the Third Czechoslovak Republic, first as Commissioner of Defence and later as Commissioner of the Interior.

Following the 1948 coup d'état, Ferjenčík emigrated to the United States. On arrival in New York he was picketed as responsible for the Soviet Union's seizure of Czechoslovakia and immediately taken to Ellis Island as a suspected communist. He was subsequently active in Czechoslovak immigrant politics, becoming director of the Czechoslovak National Council of America.

Ferjenčík died in Littleton, Colorado on 4 March 1988. In 1992 he was posthumously promoted to the rank of General of the Army.
