= Czech and Slovak Legion =

Military unit before and during WWII

The Czech and Slovak Legion, (Note: Polish: Legion Czechów i Słowaków; Czech: Legie Čechů a Slováků, Česká a slovenská legie) also known as the Czechoslovak Legion, (Note: Polish: Legion Czechosłowacki; Czech: Legion Československá legie) was a military unit formed in the Second Polish Republic after Germany occupied Czechoslovakia in March 1939. The unit took symbolic part in the defence of Poland during the German invasion on 1 September 1939.

== Background ==
After the Munich Agreement and subsequent occupation of the Czech lands, the Protectorate of Bohemia and Moravia was created as the quasi-autonomous territory controlled by Nazi Germany and surrounded mostly by countries well-disposed towards the Nazi regime. Those who were directly endangered by Nazis from political or racial reasons and those who wanted to fight for the recovery of Czechoslovak independence had to choose between the illegal route to emigration either via Slovak state and Hungarian kingdom (both considered as the client states of Germany) or via Poland.

Poland, although taking part in the Partition of Czechoslovakia in 1938, was considered as the next target of the Nazi expansion and the most possible theater of war with Nazi Germany and was therefore the sought-after country especially for the members of military resistance who hoped in the creation of Czechoslovak armed forces similar to the Czechoslovak legions in World War I.

For the Czechoslovak resistance movement abroad were the key-elements those of the ex-Czechoslovak embassies whose ambassadors and other staff did not accept the occupation of their country and refused to hand over the building to the hands of German diplomats. In the case of Poland, it was the embassy in Warsaw and the consulate in Kraków where thousands of Czechoslovak civilians as well as military personnel were seeking shelter.

== From the military group to the legion ==
Czechoslovak emigrants in Poland were roughly separated into three groups: political refugees, Jewish refugees and military personnel, the last being the only group who wanted to stay in Poland and wait for war. Lev Prchala, Czechoslovak general and former member of the autonomous government of Carpathian Ukraine, negotiated with his friends from the Polish military. However, the Polish government was reluctant to allow any military organization of Czechoslovak emigrants, so the majority, about 4,000 Czechs and Slovaks, left Poland in six transports between 22 May and 21 August 1939 to join the French Foreign Legion. About 1,000 men stayed in Poland either by their own decision or because they arrived in Poland in late summer.

The future Legion had a strength of about 700 infantry soldiers under the command of Lieutenant-Colonel Ludvík Svoboda and in early July it moved from Kraków to an empty military camp in Bronowice Małe. About 200 flying personnel were instead assigned to a Czechoslovak Reconnaissance Squadron. The Legion was however not fully formed by the time of German invasion of Poland (on 1 September) and it was only on 3 September 1939 when Polish president Ignacy Mościcki officially created the "Legion Czechów i Słowaków" — it was the first organisation of Czechoslovak resistance abroad, which was officially recognized by any allied government. General Prchala was named the commander of the Legion with Lieutenant-Colonel Svoboda as the deputy commander.

With the exception of Czechoslovak airmen, the Czechoslovak soldiers were not directly involved in the fighting in Poland. The official recognition came too late and the members of the Legion got only a handful of weapons (several machineguns for counter-air defence), neither did they have uniforms. The Reconnaissance Squadron was involved in the fight in the air alongside the Polish Air Force, although primarily in the reconnaissance role, as the aircraft they received from Poland (Potez XXV, RWD-8 and PWS-26), were mostly obsolete in air combat. On 2 September, during the German bombing of the Polish airfield in Dęblin three airmen, 1st Lt. Štěpán Kurka, Lt. Zdeněk Rous and Lt. Andrej Šandor, were killed and became the first Czechoslovak servicemen fallen in World War II. The infantry Legion was evacuated from Bronowice to the east on 12 September. The Czechoslovak transport was attacked by German planes several times. The first fallen member of Czechoslovak infantry, Sgt. Vítězslav Grünbaum, was killed on 15 September when leading the anti-aircraft fire in the train station of Hłuboczek Wielki near Tarnopol.

Most of the Legion under the command of Lt Col. Svoboda was eventually interned by the invading Soviets on 19 September. Others, particularly Gen. Prchala and his suite, managed to cross the Polish-Romanian border and were interned in Romania, as did also the Czechoslovak airmen who were ordered to withdraw with the remaining aircraft to Romania on 22 September.

== Aftermath and significance ==
Although Poland did not become a theater of a successful fight for the restoration of Czechoslovakia and the official existence of the Czechoslovak Legion was only short-lived, its impact on the morale of the emerging Czechoslovak resistance in exile and its international recognition was huge. The recognition from the French government came shortly thereafter and the Czechoslovak Army in France was officially created on 2 October 1939, though the Western front saw no action for months. The core of the army in France consisted mainly of the exiled soldiers who passed the refugees centre in Kraków or the camp in Bronowice.

After the Czechoslovak leaders in exile reached an agreement with the Soviet government in January 1941, most of the Czechoslovak soldiers were released from Soviet internment and joined the Czechoslovak units in Middle East and Africa. Their commander Lt Col. Ludvík Svoboda became member of the Czechoslovak Military Mission in USSR and after the German invasion he was commander of the 1st Czechoslovak Independent Field Battalion in USSR and later on the commander of the Czechoslovak Army Corps. On the other side, general Lev Prchala, who shortly became commander of Czechoslovak forces in Poland and successfully escaped to France via Romania, was blamed by fellow officers for abandoning his troops, got isolated, and later he became a leader of the opposition against Czechoslovak government-in-exile led by Eduard Beneš. Other notable members of the Legion include Richard Tesařík and Otakar Jaroš who later received the highest Soviet decoration (Hero of the Soviet Union), or the aces of the Battle of Britain such as Josef František.

== Citations ==
=== Further reading ===
- Kopecký, Rudolf (1958). Československý odboj v Polsku v r. 1939 (in Czech) (Modrá Revue ed.). Rotterdam.
- Legion czechosłowacki w Polsce, Śląski Instytut Naukowy, Katowice 1989
- Svoboda, Ludvík (1996). Cestami života I. (in Czech) (2 ed.). Říčany: Orego. ISBN 80-902107-5-9.
- Svoboda, Ludvík (2008). Klusáková, Zoe (ed.). Deník z doby válečné, červen 1939 — leden 1943 (in Czech). Praha: Mladá fronta. ISBN 978-80-204-1939-2.
