= Alois Šiška =

Alois Šiška (15 May 1914 – 9 September 2003) was a Czechoslovak pilot. He flew for No. 311 Squadron RAF, a Czechoslovak bomber squadron during World War II. Šiška and his crew crashed in the North Sea; half died before they drifted to enemy-occupied land. The survivors became prisoners of war. He was a decorated veteran and a member of the Guinea Pig Club, an association that focused on the treatment, rehabilitation and socialization of airmen who suffered serious injuries in the war.

== Early life ==
Šiška was born in Lutopecny near Kroměříž in 1914. His family had a small farm, and he was one of three children. From a young age, Šiška wanted to fly and to become a pilot. However, he became an apprentice locksmith and later a mechanical engineer. He then joined the Bata Aviation Factory in Otrokovice. He would later earn a reward of 5000 crowns for his improvement proposal for the Zlin Z-XII aircraft, but he preferred pilot training. In September 1936, aged 22, he passed the pilot tests for tourist aircraft. He entered military service and decided to become a military pilot. He mastered combat training, served in aviation units and in September 1938 was at the field airport in Ivanovice among the prepared crews.

== World War II ==
Šiska was a member of an illegal cell through which he helped Jews and others escape to Poland and later to Hungary. He remained in the republic until the outbreak of war. At that time, fear grew that the Germans would discover a hidden prototype of the Z-XIII aircraft. In order not to fall into their hands, it was decided within the illegal group that the prototype must fly to the Balkans. However, this plan failed. Together with Alois Bača, they fled across the frozen river Morava to Slovakia, then with the help of a Hungarian pastor, they crossed the Slovak-Hungarian border and continued by train to the border with Yugoslavia. There they were arrested by a Hungarian border guard and imprisoned in Hodmezövasárhely prison for several weeks. After a failed escape attempt, they were deported to the Citadella in Budapest. Here they were held in harsh conditions together with another hundred and twenty Czechs and a similar number of Poles. An opportunity to escape did not come until 30 March 1940, when Šiška reported to the doctor suffering from scabies. He managed to escape his guards and took a taxi to the French consulate. From there he was secretly taken to the Yugoslav border at night, and made a successful crossing. His following steps, already a member of MS. foreign troops, headed through Turkey to Syria, where he joined with other members of the army on a boat trip across the Mediterranean to France. They landed in Marseille on 25 April, briefly served at an airport near Bordeaux, but did not intervene in the ongoing fighting for France, and on 21 June were on their way to the English coast.

In England, he joined the RAF Volunteer Reserve, becoming a sergeant pilot. He was assigned to No 311 (Czechoslovak) Bomber Squadron based at RAF East Wretham, Norfolk. He belonged to a few MS. pilots who participated in the crossing of the Alps with subsequent bombing of the industrial Italian city of Turin.

=== The North Sea and prisoner of war ===
On 28 December 1941, a six-member crew of 311 Squadron had to make a rough emergency landing in the North Sea after damage to the plane KX-B after the bombing of Wilhelmshaven. During the landing, one of his crew lost his life, while the remaining five members had to make use of an inflatable boat to survive. At sea, they had close encounters with rescue planes, but rescue did not come despite the unwritten agreement in RAF to save castaways at all costs. The planes dropped parcels full of resources, but due to the rough sea, the crew members did not dare go into the water to retrieve the packages. Due to poor health and no help in sight, Šiška and the crew members contemplated suicide but decided against it as they had no means to carry out the deed and did not want to do it by self-drowning. Not all survived the drift at sea.

Out of the six original crew members, Alois Šiška, Pavel Svoboda, and Josef Ščerba were the only ones to survive. Much to their astonishment, they drifted towards the Dutch coast and when they were found near the Petten, they were arrested by the German Coast Guard. The crew members were arrested and taken to hospitals. Šiška was in the worst state of the three as he had gotten severe frostbite and gangrene of the feet, and doctors were preparing for amputation when Šiška experienced a sudden heart attack. This experience and his subsequent apparent clinical death ultimately saved his feet from amputation, but he could not walk until after the war when he underwent multiple surgeries to help repair the damage. During captivity, Šiška was held at multiple prison camps and was questioned by the Gestapo as a "traitor to the Great German Empire" as he was viewed as a deserter (Czechoslovakia was then German territory). The Gestapo ordered a death sentence for Šiška, but that order was never enforced due to threats from Winston Churchill that for every soldier killed in a British uniform, two high-rank German officials would be killed in response. Until the end of the war, he was held at Oflag IV-C in Colditz Castle, a notorious prison camp that held military elites. He was liberated on April 7, 1945, and was immediately sent to the United Kingdom for treatment.

== Post-war ==
After liberation, Šiška underwent 14 spine and leg surgeries at the Queen Victoria Hospital, East Grinstead, thereby gaining membership of the Guinea Pig Club. He returned to his homeland in 1947 to serve in the military in Prague. While in the military, he rejected invitations to join the Communist Party. He was arrested multiple times between 1948 and 1950, and had to retire from the Air Force. Šiška and his family were evicted from Prague after he was named as a "dangerous person", and was limited in his work thereafter. He worked in agriculture and as a TV repairman because as an ex-RAF pilot he was not allowed to hold a career. He was briefly recalled to military service in 1968, but released in 1970 due to health issues. He was completely rehabilitated in 1989 and was allowed back to Prague. On 3 May 1995, he was appointed major general.

Šiška authored the book No Response KX-B.

He died in Prague on 9 September 2003.

== Recognition ==
Šiška was honoured many times throughout his life and posthumously. For instance, on 17 October 2012, a monument was unveiled in Petten, Holland, in honor of the Czech crew of the Wellington KX-B plane that went down in the North Sea on 28 December 1941. Petten is the town nearest where Šiška and the remaining crew members were found.

Šiška holds the highest Czech honour, the Order of the White Lion class III. It was conferred posthumously on 28 September 2003, as he had died a few weeks previously.

A list of all his awards/medals:

- Order of the White Lion, Class I military group
- Order of the White Lion, III. Class Military Group, awarded September 28, 2003, in memoriam
- Order of Milan Rastislav Štefánik, III. class awarded 1991
- Cross of Merit of the Minister of Defense of the Czech Republic I. degree
- Czechoslovak War Cross 1939–1945 (four awards)
- Czechoslovak Medal for Valor before the enemy
- Czechoslovak Military Medal of Merit, 1st Grade
- Order of the Red Star
