= Order of the Falcon (Czechoslovakia) =

Order of the Falcon of Štefánik (Štefánikův řád Sokola)
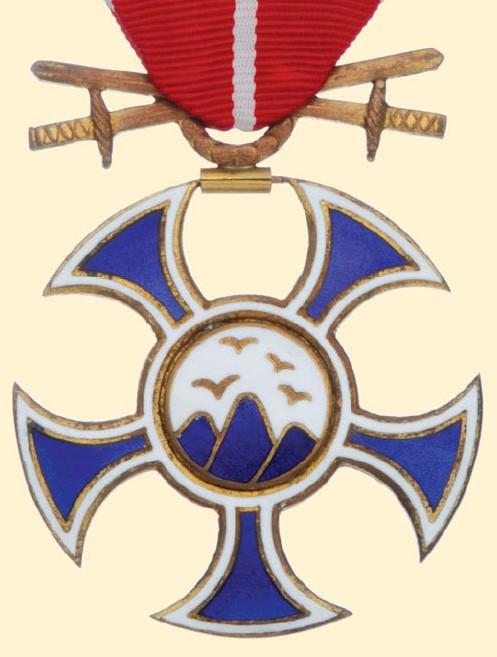
- Badge of a Knight of the Order of the Falcon (with swords)

Awarded by Provisional Government of Czechoslovakia
- Type: Order of merit
- Established: November 1918
- Status: Abolished 1919
- Grades: Grand Cross; Grand Officer; Commander; Officer; Knight
- Ribbon with star (left) and without star (right).

The Order of the Falcon of Štefánik (Czech: Štefánikův Řád Sokola), also known unofficially as the Štefánikův Order was a Czechoslovak order established in November 1918.

== History ==
The establishment of the Order of the Falcon in 1919 resulted from a proposal in September 1918 by the Minister of War Milan Rastislav Štefánik (hence the unofficial name) and was intended to recognise achievements that contributed to the liberation of Czechoslovakia. Membership of the order was primarily conferred upon members of the Czechoslovak Legions who served in Siberia during the Russian Civil War. The order was short-lived as all Czechoslovak orders were abolished in 1919, soon after the Czechoslovak Republic declared independence; they were 'regarded as undemocratic'. One of the most famous officers to be appointed a Knight of the Order of the Falcon was Major General Jan Syrový. During the Russian Civil War, Syrový commanded all anti-Bolshevik forces in Siberia from October 1918 to January 1919 and, in September 1938 as the Czechoslovak Prime Minister, he was forced to accept the terms of the Munich Agreement.

== Composition ==
Appointments to the Order were in either the Military or Civilian divisions. The order was intended to consist of five classes:

- Grand Cross (Czech: Velkokříž), Class I
- Grand Officer (Czech: Velkodůstojník), Class II
- Commander (Czech: Komtur), Class III
- Officer (Czech: Důstojník), Class IV
- Knight (Czech: Rytíř), Class V

In practice appointments were only made to the lowest class.

== Insignia ==
Badge. The badge of the order is an inverted star (point down) comprising a convex central white enamel disc, edged white with a gilt border, the whole surrounded by five blue rays pattée moussé, edged white with gilt borders. The obverse of the center disc is charged with three hills in blue with gilt borders, surmounted by four gilt falcons in flight. The reverse of the convex center disc is charged with the monogram ČS in blue with gilt borders, surmounting the date 1918 in gilt and surrounded on either side by a branch of gilt laurel leaves.

Suspension device. The badge for civilian awards is suspended from a circlet formed from gilt laurel leaves, whilst gilt crossed swords are added to the suspension device for military awards.

Ribbon. The badge of the order is suspended from a red moire silk ribbon divided by a central narrow white stripe, with a thin white stripe set in from either edge.

Star. Appointments could also be made with a star affixed to the ribbon signifying additional distinction.

Štefánik had the first insignia produced in Tokyo; these were supplied in a lacquered balsa wood box.

== Knights ==
The following is an incomplete list of people appointed as knights of the Order of the Falcon:

List of knights with sword
Name	Birth	Death	Rank Rank	Service branch	Notable appointments	Ref
Jindřich Bejl	1890	1973	Maj later BdeGen	Inf Offr; CS Army		
Alois Benda	1890	1957	Maj later BdeGen	Inf Offr; CS Army		
Jan Beneš	1886	1949	Maj later BdeGen	Inf Offr; CS Army		
Jindřich Birula	1895	1972	LtCol later BdeGen	Inf Offr; CS Army		
František Bláha	1886	1945	Maj later DivGen Mem	Inf Offr; CS Army		
Stanislav Čeček	1886	1930	DivGen	Inf Offr; CS Army	Head of the Czechoslovak Ministry of Aviation	
Jan Čermák	1893	1961	Capt later BdeGen	Inf and Engr Offr; CS Army	Commander III Corps Engineers	
Jaroslav Červinka	1889	1985	Col later BdeGen	Inf and Cav Offr; CS Army		
Jaroslav Čihák	1891	1944	Capt later DivGen Mem	Inf Offr; CS Army	Chairman of the Czechoslovak Red Cross in exile Member of the Czechoslovak National Council in exile	
Antonín Číla	1883	1983	LtCol later BdeGen	Inf Offr; CS Army		
Jaroslav Čížek	1891	1972	Capt later BdeGen	Inf Offr; CS Army	Secretary General of the Czechoslovak Inter-ministerial Council for Matters of National Defence	
Mikhail Diterikhs	1875	1937	LtGen	Cav Offr; Ru Army	Commander of the Czechoslovak Legions; Military Affairs Minister	
Josef Dostál	1891	1945	Capt later DivGen Mem	Inf and Cav Offr; CS Army		
Josef Eisenberger	1887	1955	Maj later (Bde)Gen	Inf Offr; CS Army		
Jaroslav Fajfr	1883	1974	Maj later MajGen	Inf Offr; CS Army		
Julius Fišera	1894	?	Maj later BdeGen	Cav Offr; CS Army		
Radola Gajda	1892	1948	DivGen	Inf Offr; CS Army	Deputy Chief of Staff for the Czechoslovak Army; National Fascist Community politician	
Vladimír Haering	1882	1942	LtCol later ChiefGenMS; Mem	Med Offr; CS Army	Chief of Czechoslovak Army Corps Medical Services	
Antonín Hasal	1893	1960	LtCol later ArmyGen	Inf Offr; CS Army	Czechoslovak Minister for Transport and Technology	
František Havel	1883	1958	Maj later BdeGen	Engr Offr; CS Army		
Bedřich Homola	1887	1943	Maj later ArmyGen Mem	Inf Offr; CS Army	Commander VII Corps	
Rudolf Hošek	1887	?	Maj later DivGen	Inf Offr; CS Army		
František Hrabčík	1894	1967	Maj later DivGen	Inf Offr; CS Army	Secretary of the Czechoslovak Ministry of Defence	
Karel Husárek	1893	1972	LtCol later DivGen	Inf Offr; CS Army	Czechoslovak Minister for Railways	
Josef Janáček	1885	1954	Capt later DivGen	Inf Offr; CS Army	Commander IV Corps	
Pierre Thiebaut Charles Maurice Janin	1862	1946	LtGen later LtGen	Inf Offr; Fr Army	Commander VII Corps (French Army); Commander-in-Chief Czechoslovak Legion Headquarters	
Rudolf Janů	1879	1934	LtCol later BdeGen	Inf Offr; CS Army		
Eduard Kadlec	1880	1961	Col later ArmyGen	Arty Offr; CS Army	Commander IV Corps	
Bonifác Káňa	1893	1941	Capt later BdeGen	Inf Offr; CS Army		
Jan Karger	1887	1977	Capt later BdeGen	Inf and Arty Offr; CS Army	Commander VI Corps Artillery	
Jaroslav Kejla	1892	?	Col later GenTOSA	Inf and Ord Offr; CS Army	Aviation Materiel Department Head, Czechoslovak Ministry of Defence	
Vojtěch Klecanda	1888	1947	LtCol later DivGen	Inf Offr; CS Army	division commander and military attaché	
Karel Klubal	1886	1939	Capt later BdeGen	Inf Offr; CS Army		
František Kolařík	1881	1950	Maj later DivGen	Engr Offr; CS Army		
Václav Kopal	1882	1935	Maj later DivGen	Inf Offr; CS Army		
Josef Koutňák	1890	1961	Capt later DivGen Mem	Cav Offr; CS Army	Commander Czechoslovak Tank Corps	
Ludvík Krejčí	1890	1972	Col later ArmyGen	Inf Offr; CS Army	Commander-in-Chief Czechoslovak Armed Forces	
Josef Kroutil	1879	1936	LtCol later DivGen	Inf Offr; CS Army		
Rudolf Kroutil	1884	1964	Maj later MajGen	Arty Offr; CS Army	Head Artillery Department, Czechoslovak Ministry of Defence	
Miloš Kudrna	1884	1951	Maj later BdeGen	Inf Offr; CS Army		
Karel Kutlvašr	1895	1961	LtCol later ArmyGen Mem	Inf Offr; CS Army	Commander III Corps; Commander V Corps	
Otakar Líčka	1889	1963	Maj later BdeGen	Inf Offr; CS Army		
Emil Linhart	1889	1959	Capt later DivGen	Inf Offr; CS Army	Commander I Corps	
Vojtěch Luža	1891	1944	Maj later ArmyGen Mem	Inf Offr; CS Army	Commander IV Corps; Commander V Corps	
Rudolf Medek	1890	1940	LtCol later (Bde)Gen	Inf Offr; CS Army		
Karel Mejstřík	1886	1945	Maj later DivGen Mem	Inf Offr; CS Army		
Ondřej Mézl	1887	1968	Maj later DivGen	Inf Offr; CS Army	Commander VI Corps; Chief of Czechoslovak Missions to Middle East, 21st Army Group and Allied Headquarters	
Ondřej Moravec	1887	?	Maj later BdeGen	Inf Offr; CS Army	Secretary General of the Czechoslovak Inter-ministerial Council for Matters of National Defence	
Josef Mrázek	1885	1967	Maj later BdeGen	Arty Offr; CS Army	Artillery Department Head, Czechoslovak Ministry of Defence	
Matěj Němec	1886	1975	LtCol later DivGen	Inf Offr; CS Army		
Jan Netík	1885	1945	Maj later DivGen	Arty Offr; CS Army	Artillery Department Head, Czechoslovak Ministry of Defence	
Bedřich Neumann	1891	1964	Maj later DivGen	Inf Offr; CS Army	Chief of Staff, Czechoslovak Armed Forces Headquarters	
Václav Nosek	1887	1953	Maj later BdeGen	Engr Offr; CS Army	Commander I Corps Engineers; Commander Army Engineers	
František Nosál	1889	1963	LtCol later DivGen	Inf Offr; CS Army	Czechoslovak Minister of Public Works	
Josef Nosál	1885	1940	Maj later BdeGen	Arty Offr; CS Army		
Zdeněk Novák	1891	1988	Maj later BdeGen	Arty Offr; CS Army	Commander IV Corps Artillery; Commander Land Artillery Command	
Josef Palacký	1888	1938	Maj later BdeGen	Inf Offr; CS Army		
Václav Petřík	1885	1957	Col later BdeGen	Inf Offr; CS Army		
Josef Petrš	1886	1968	Col later BdeGen	Inf Offr; CS Army		
Josef Pícek	1874	?	Maj later GenMS	Med Offr; CS Army		
Lev Prchala	1892	1963	Col later ArmyGen	Inf Offr; CS Army	Minister of Finance, Interior and Transport, Autonomous Carpathia and Ruthenia; Commander Czech and Slovak Legion	
Vladimír Přikryl	1888	1955	Maj later DivGen	Arty Offr; CS Army	Commander 1st Army Artillery; Commander Land Artillery Command	
Robert Pytlík	1887	1965	Maj later GenMS	Med Offr; CS Army		
Rudolf Raše	1872	1954	Col later GenMS	Med Offr; CS Army		
Bedřich Ruml	1888	1980	Lt later DivGen	Arty Offr; CS Army	Deputy Commander II Corps	
Jan Růžička	1896	1968	Lt later BdeGen	Arty Offr; CS Army	Commander VII Corps Artillery	
Bohumil Rytíř	1889	?	Maj later BdeGen	Inf Offr; CS Army		
František Slunečko	1886	1963	Maj later MajGen	Inf Offr; CS Army	Commander I Corps	
Vladimir Šokorov (ru)	1868	1940	LtGen	Inf Offr; CS Army	Commander-in-Chief Allied Forces, Siberian Theatre	
Jan Staněk	1882	?	Capt later GenLS	Inf and Legal Offr; CS Army	Attorney General, Office of the General Military Prosecurtor	
Karel Štěpánek	1883	1966	Capt later BdeGen	Inf and Engr Offr; CS Army		
Václav Suchý	1881	1966	Maj later ChiefGenIS	Inf and Ord Offr; CS Army		
Oleg Svátek	1888	1941	LtCol later DivGen Mem	Inf Offr; CS Army		
Jan Syrový	1888	1970	MajGen later ArmyGen	Inf Offr; CS Army	Czechoslovak Prime Minister and Minister of National Defence	
František Tallavania	1894	1981	Maj later BdeGen	Arty Offr; CS Army		
Karel Urbánek	1878	1937	Capt later BdeGen	Inf Offr; CS Army		
Josef Váňa	1893	1976	LtCol later DivGen	Inf Offr; CS Army	Commander II Corps	
Josef Vedral	1886	1979	Maj later BdeGen	Arty Offr; CS Army	Commander Land Artillery Command	
Rudolf Viest	1890	1945	Maj later ArmyGen Mem	Inf Offr; CS Army	Commander 1st Army; Minister of State, Czechoslovak Ministry of Defence in exile	
Karel Vojan	1887	1978	Lt later BdeGen	Arty Offr; CS Army	Commander II Corps Artillery	
Sergej Vojcechovský (ru)	1883	1951	MajGen later ArmyGen	Inf Offr; CS Army	Commander 1st Army	
Hugo Vojta	1885	1941	Maj later MajGen	Arty Offr; CS Army	Commander Headquarters Land Artillery	
Karel Voženílek	1883	1943	Col later DivGen	Inf Offr; CS Army		
Bohuslav Všetička	1893	1942	LtCol later DivGen Mem	Arty Offr; CS Army	Commander VIII Corps	
Dominik Vymětal	1883	1953	Maj later GenMS	Med Offr; CS Army	Head Health Service Corps	
Miloš Žák	1891	1970	LtCol later DivGen	Inf Offr; CS Army		
Václav Ždímal	1890	1942	Capt later DivGen Mem	Arty Offr; CS Army	Commander IV Corps Artillery	
Josef Zmek	1889	1942	Maj later DivGen Mem	Inf Offr; CS Army		

Legend

Ranks

1. ArmyGen = Army General, equivalent to General (4-star rank)
2. LtGen = Lieutenant General (3-star rank)
3. DivGen = Division General, equivalent to Major General (2-star rank)
4. ChiefGenIS = Chief General of the Intendent Services, equivalent to Major General
5. ChiefGenMS = Chief General of the Medical Services, equivalent to Major General
6. BdeGen = Brigade General, equivalent to Brigadier General (1-star rank)
7. (Bde)Gen = General, equivalent to Brigadier General
8. GenLS = General of the Legal Services, equivalent to Brigadier General
9. GenMS = General of the Medical Services, equivalent to Brigadier General
10. GenTOSA = General of the Technical Ordnance Service of Aviation, equivalent to Brigadier General
11. Mem = in memoriam, rank was granted posthumously

Service/Branch

1. Arty = Artillery, Engr = Engineering, Inf = Infantry, Leg = Legal, Med = Medical, Offr = Officer, Ord = Ordnance
2. CS = Czechoslovak, Fr = French, Ru = Russian
