= Rudolf Krzák =

Major General Rudolf Krzák
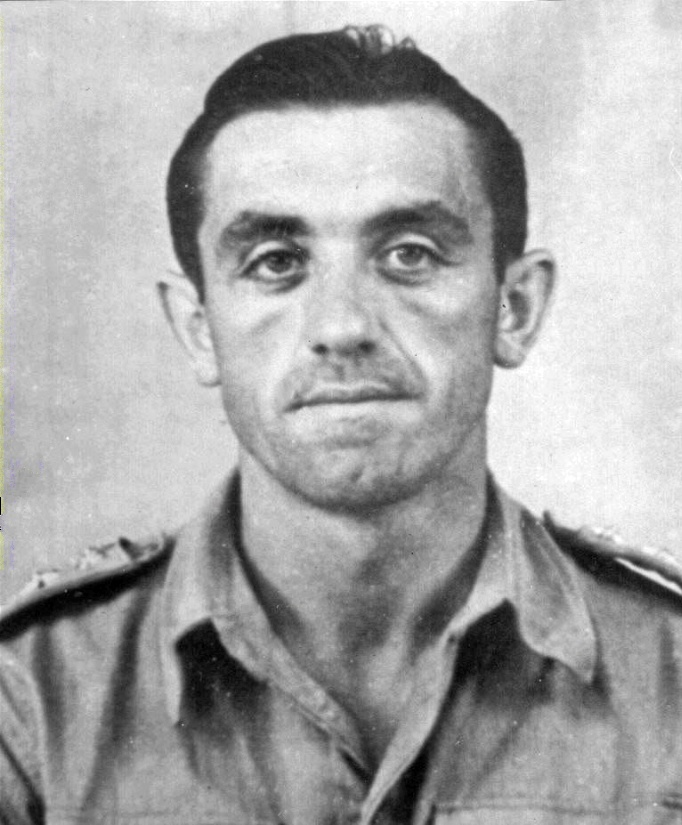
- Born: 6 April 1914; Bernartice, Bohemia, Austria-Hungary
- Died: 22 April 2004 (aged 90); Poděbrady, Czech Republic
- Education: Czechoslovak Military Academy
- Occupation: soldier

Major General Rudolf Krzák (6 April 1914 - 22 April 2004) was a high ranking soldier in the Free Czech Army.

== Biography ==
Krzák was educated at the Czechoslovak Military Academy. He was the last survivor from the group of Czech soldiers, based in the United Kingdom, that planned Operation Anthropoid, the assassination of Reinhard Heydrich in 1942. He was the deputy commander of Special Group D which worked with SOE to train paratroopers for special operations. Amongst his two trainees for specialist operations in Europe were the two Czechoslovak paratroopers, Jan Kubiš and Jozef Gabčík.
