= Polomka =

Polomka Garamszécs
- Municipality
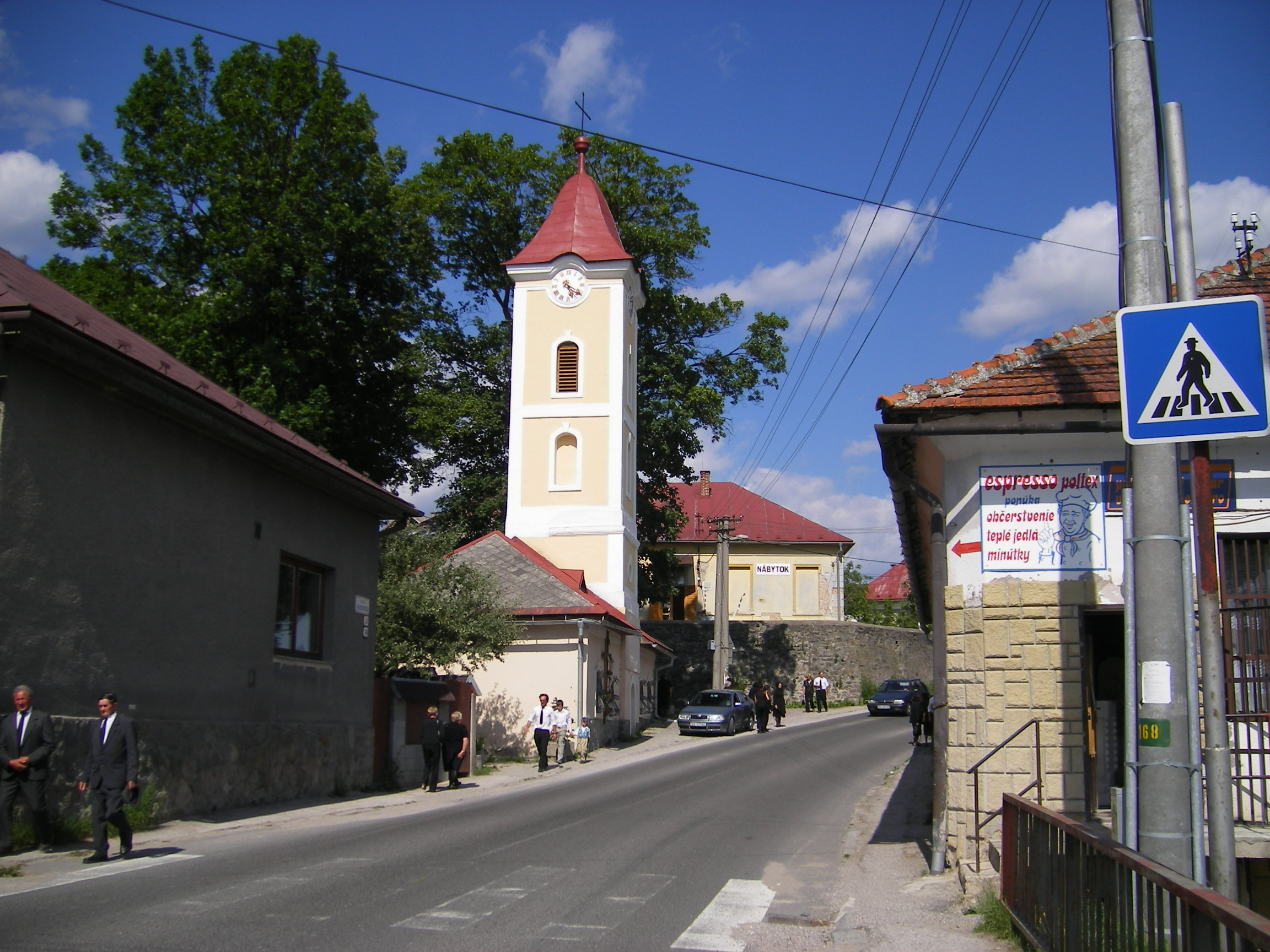

- Flag

- Location of Polomka in the Banská Bystrica Region Location of Polomka in Slovakia
- Coordinates: 48.85°N 19.85°E
- Country: Slovakia
- Region: Banská Bystrica Region
- District: Brezno District
- First mentioned: 1551

Area
  - Total: 94.03 km^{2} (36.31 sq mi)
- Elevation: 614 m (2,014 ft)

Population (2025)
  - Total: 2,870
- Time zone: UTC+1 (CET)
  - Summer (DST): UTC+2 (CEST)
- Postal code: 976 66
- Area code: +421 48
- Vehicle registration plate (until 2022): BR
- Website: www.polomka.sk

Polomka (Hungarian: Garamszécs) is a village and municipality in Brezno District, in the Banská Bystrica Region of central Slovakia.

== Geography ==
The municipality lies at an altitude of 614 metres (2,014 ft) and covers an area of 94.03 km^{2} (36.31 sq mi) (2025).

== Population ==
Population statistic (10 years)
Year	1995	2005	2015	2025
Count	3201	3136	3038	2870
Difference		−2.03%	−3.12%	−5.52%

Population statistic
Year	2024	2025
Count	2859	2870
Difference		+0.38%

It has a population of 2870 people (31 December 2025).

=== Ethnicity ===
Census 2021 (1+ %)
Ethnicity	Number	Fraction
Slovak	2802	95.24%
Romani	373	12.67%
Not found out	111	3.77%
Total	2942	

In year 2021 was 2942 people by ethnicity 2802 as Slovak, 373 as Romani, 111 as Not found out, 19 as Ukrainian, 17 as Czech, 14 as Other, 11 as Rusyn, 8 as Hungarian, 5 as German, 4 as Italian, 4 as Russian, 3 as Polish, 1 as Vietnamese and 1 as Greek.

Note on population: The difference values of population numbers in the table "Population statistic" and in the sections "Ethnicity" & "Religion" is caused by the use of various statistical methods.

=== Religion ===
Census 2021 (1+ %)
Religion	Number	Fraction
Roman Catholic Church	2279	77.46%
None	417	14.17%
Not found out	106	3.6%
Greek Catholic Church	51	1.73%
Evangelical Church	32	1.09%
Total	2942	

In year 2021 was 2942 people by religion 2279 from Roman Catholic Church, 417 from None, 106 from Not found out, 51 from Greek Catholic Church, 32 from Evangelical Church, 10 from Jehovah's Witnesses, 7 from Eastern Orthodox Church, 7 from Other, 6 from Christian Congregations in Slovakia, 6 from Ad hoc movements, 5 from Islam, 4 from Old Catholic Church, 4 from Paganism and natural spirituality, 3 from Calvinist Church, 3 from Other and not ascertained christian church, 1 from Church of the Brethren and 1 from Seventh-day Adventist Church.
