= Eva Clarke =

British-Czech Holocaust survivor (born 1945)

Eva Clarke BEM
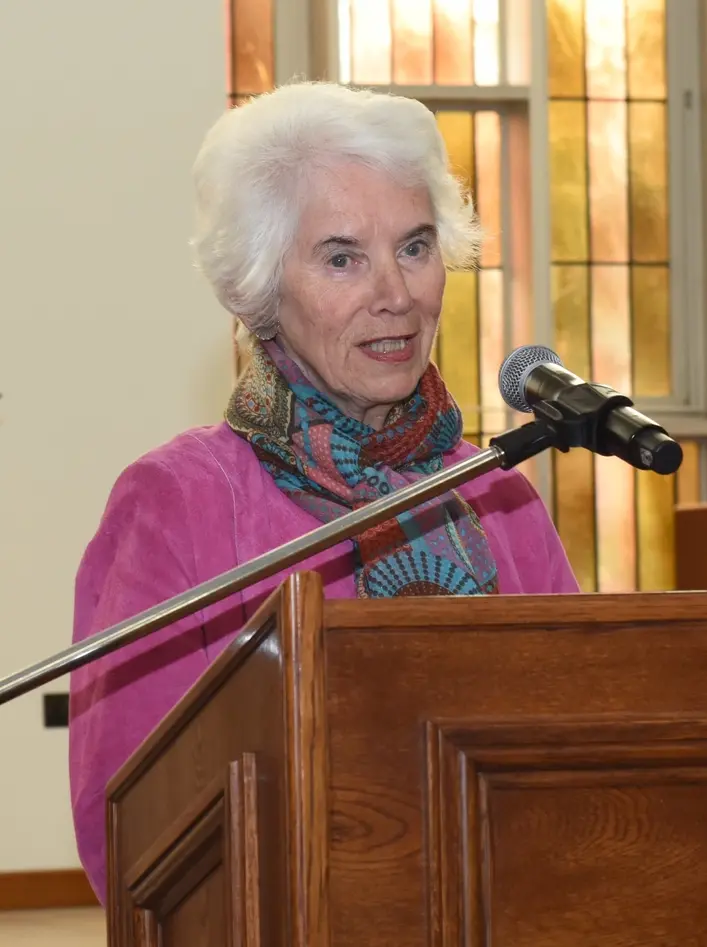
- Clarke at a Holocaust Remembrance Week event at RAF Mildenhall in 2022
- Born: Eva Olga Nathanová; 29 April 1945 (age 81); Mauthausen, Austria
- Occupation: College administrator
- Known for: Holocaust survivor
- Spouse: Malcolm Clarke
- Children: 2
- Parents: Anka Bergman (Mother); Bernd Nathan (Father); Karel Bergman (Adoptive Father)
- Honours: British Empire Medal (2019)

Eva Olga Clarke BEM (née Nathanová; born 29 April 1945) is a British Holocaust survivor and former college administrator known for her birth at Mauthausen concentration camp. Born to Czech-Jewish mother Anka Bergman, she is a speaker for the Holocaust Educational Trust. Clarke combats modern day instances of racism and prejudice through sharing her family's experiences in the Holocaust.

== Birth and early life ==
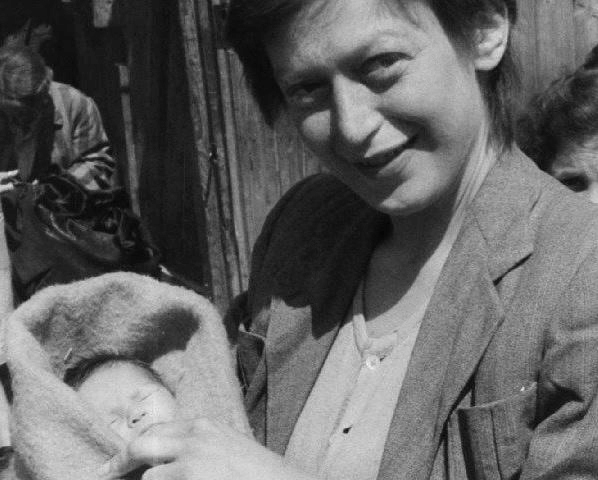
Image still from a reel by the U.S. Army Signal Corps of Anka Nathanová and her newborn daughter, Eva Clark at Mauthausen concentration camp.

Clarke was born on 29 April 1945 on a cart at the gates of Mauthausen concentration camp. Her mother, Anka Nathanová, a Czech Jew from Třebechovice weighed less than 35 kilograms (77 lb) and had managed to hide her pregnancy long enough to keep herself and her unborn child safe from the Nazi gas chambers.

Before giving birth, Nathanová endured three years in the Theresienstadt ghetto, six months of slave labour in an armaments factory in Freiburg, Germany, and a 17-day train journey in an open coal car to Mauthausen. When she previously arrived at the Auschwitz concentration camp, the Nazi SS doctor Josef Mengele asked if she was pregnant, to which she had lied and replied no.

Clarke's father, Bernd Nathan, a German-Jewish architect, who had previously moved from Germany to Prague in an attempt to escape Nazi control, was shot and killed on 18 January 1945, shortly before the liberation of Auschwitz concentration camp. In September 1944 Bernd had been transported to Auschwitz before Nathanová could tell him she was pregnant. Nathan and Nathanová's first child, Dan (George) was born in 1944 in the Theresienstadt ghetto and died of pneumonia at the age of two months.

Six days after Clarke's birth US troops liberated Mauthausen, and an Army Signal Corps cameraman filmed the human wreckage as evidence of Nazi atrocities. He also filmed Nathanová with her new baby.

After the war, Anka moved with Eva to Prague to live with Nathanová's cousin. In February 1948, Anka married old acquaintance, Karel Bergman, a Czechoslovak Jew and former Royal Air Force interpreter who had previously escaped to the United Kingdom in 1939. Born in Trhová Kamenice, Bergman had fled Nazi persecution, later serving in the 312th Czechoslovak Fighter Squadron. After the war, Karel Bergman returned to Czechoslovakia as the sole survivor of his family.

In September 1948, following the communist takeover, the family fled intending to emigrate to Canada, but a job offer in Wales allowed Bergman to return instead in the United Kingdom. Bergman found work in Pontypridd, Wales, later purchasing the company where he was employed. The family settled in Cardiff and then Cyncoed, where Clarke attended Rhydypenau Primary School and Our Lady's Convent School.

== Career ==
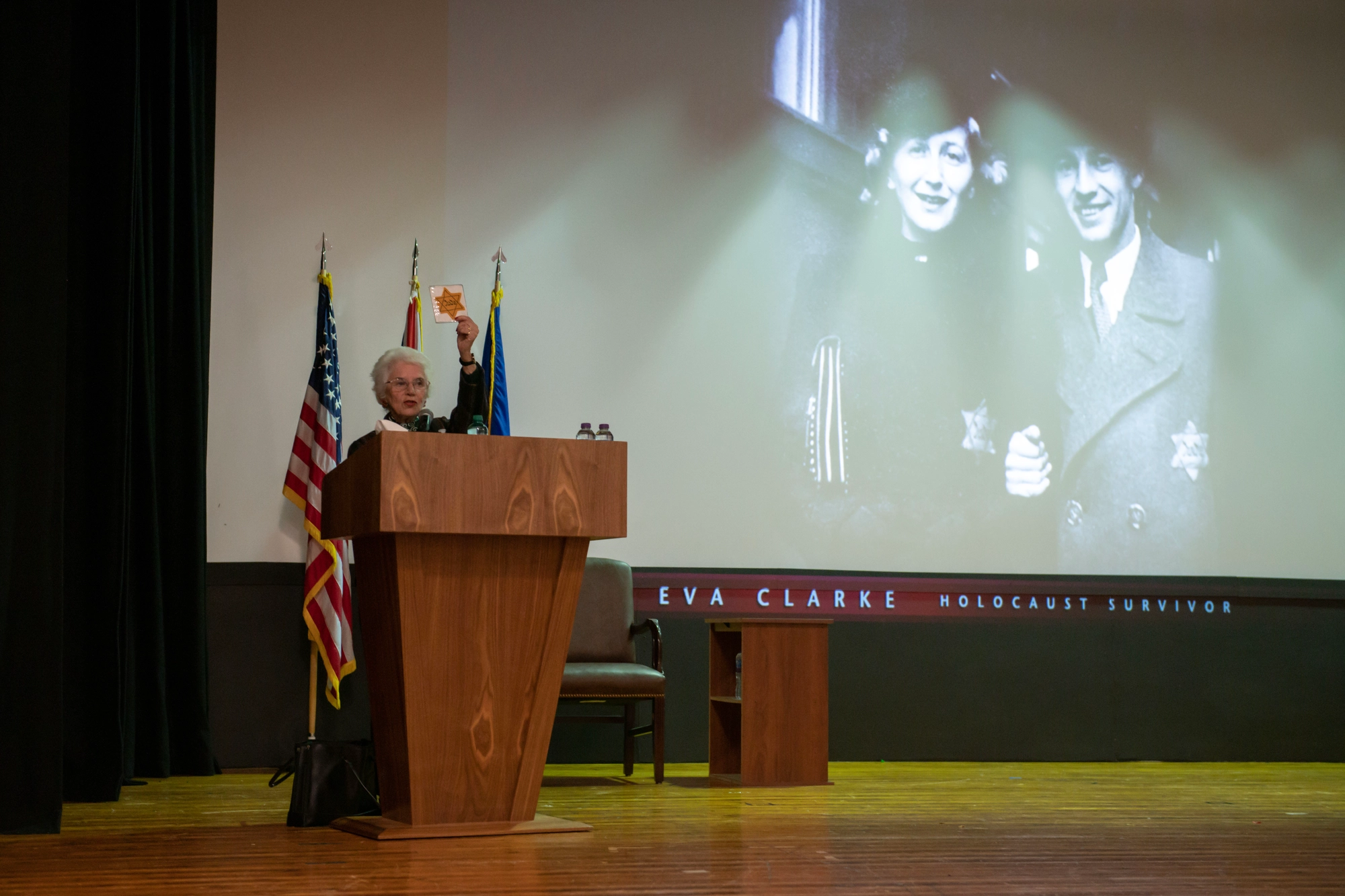
Clarke speaking to the US 501st Combat Support Wing at RAF Alconbury in 2023.

Clarke was an administrator at Cambridge Regional College for 20 years. In 2000, she began speaking publicly of her family's experiences during the Holocaust. Clarke volunteers as a speaker for the Holocaust Educational Trust. She also supports the Anne Frank Trust and the Beth Shalom Holocaust Centre.

In 2010, she attended the 65th anniversary of the liberation of Mauthausen. Clarke returned in May 2013 as one of 20 survivors invited by the Austrian government to attend the opening of a new exhibition. She is one of the three subjects of the book Born Survivors: Three Young Mothers and Their Extraordinary Story of Courage, Defiance and Hope (2015) by British writer Wendy Holden. In 2020, Clarke's birth certificate was on display at the Imperial War Museum. Through her testimonials, she hopes people learn from the Holocaust and combat modern day instances of racism and prejudice.

== Personal life ==
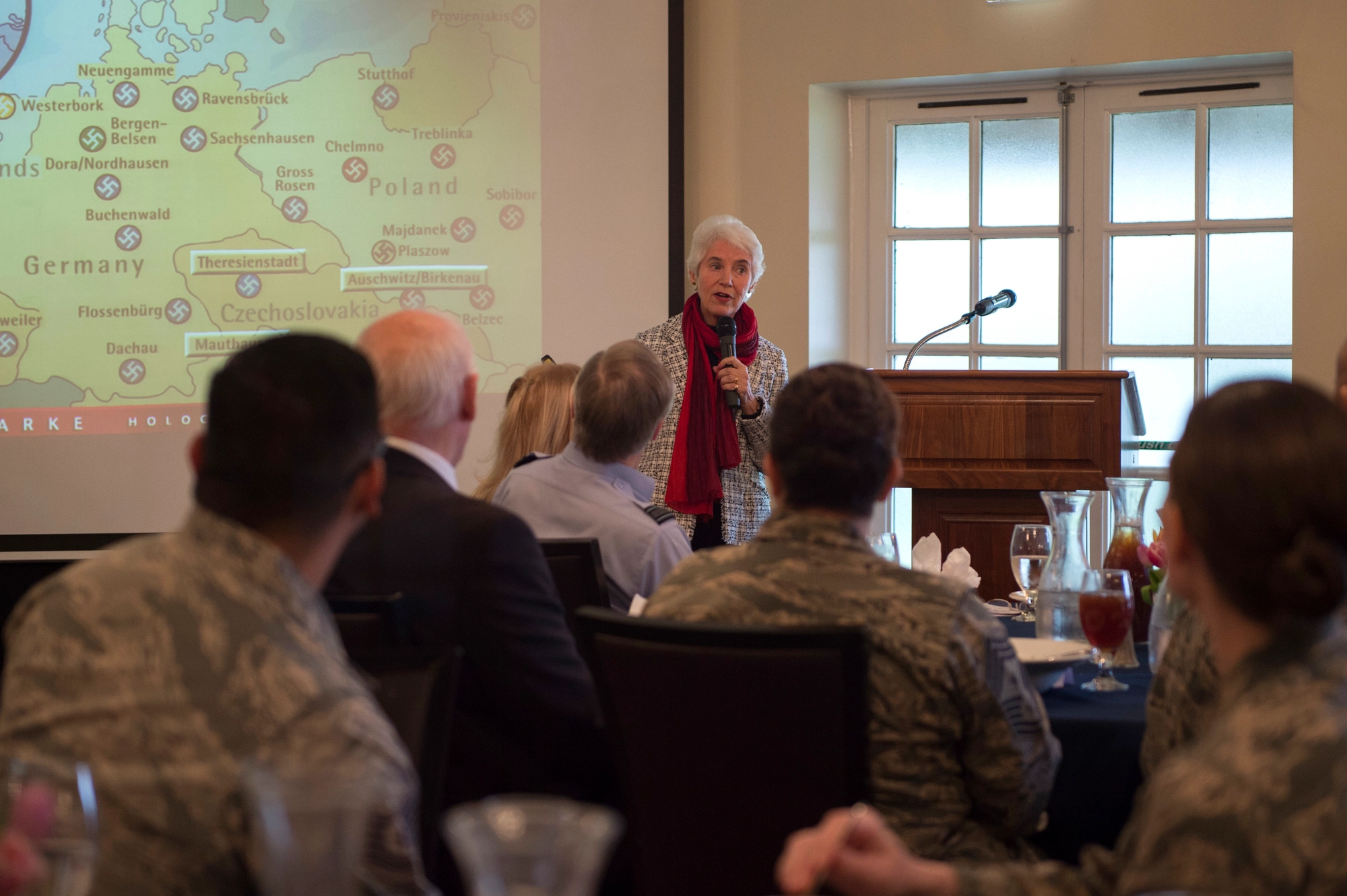
Clarke speaking at a Holocaust Remembrance Ceremony in 2018

Clarke lived in Cardiff until she was 18. In the 1960s, she met and married Malcom Clarke from Abergavenny (1943–2024), a professor of law at Cambridge University, and they had two sons. Clarke's father-in-law, Kenneth Clarke, was a navigator in RAF Bomber Command who participated in the bombing of Dresden while her mother, Anka Nathanová, was sheltering with other prisoners. As of 2017, Clarke resides in Cambridge.

== Awards and honors ==
In 2015, De Montfort University awarded Clarke an honorary doctorate in law for her work in Holocaust education. Clarke was one of four Holocaust survivors awarded the British Empire Medal in the 2019 New Year Honours "For services to Holocaust education" in their efforts to share testimonials of their experiences for future generations. In 2023, Clarke was awarded the Freedom of the County Borough of Blaenau Gwent in Wales.
