= Karel Bergman =

Czech RAF liaison officer

- Born: 2 September 1902; Trhová Kamenice, Bohemia, Austria-Hungary
- Died: 14 September 1983 (aged 81); London, United Kingdom
- Spouse: Anka Bergman
- Children: Eva Clarke
- Military career
- Allegiance: Czechoslovakia; United Kingdom
- Branch: Royal Air Force
- Service years: 1941–1945
- Rank: Warrant Officer
- Unit: No. 312 Squadron RAF
- Conflicts: World War II
- Awards: Czechoslovak War Cross; Defence Medal (United Kingdom)

Karel Bergman (2 September 1902 – 14 September 1983) was a Czech-Jewish military translator and member of the Royal Air Force during World War II. Bergman served as a translator and liaison officer, primarily with No. 312 (Czechoslovak) Squadron RAF. He was the husband of holocaust survivor Anka Bergman, and stepfather to holocaust educator Eva Clarke.

== Early life ==
Bergman was born in Trhová Kamenice, in what is now the Czech Republic, to a Jewish family. His father, Maxmilian Bergman, was a businessman and factory owner. His mother, Hermína (née Spitzerová), came from Netolice. Karel had a twin sister Greta, was born two days earlier. He attended local schools, followed by business studies at a commercial academy.

== Emigration and World War II ==
Facing increasing anti-Semitic persecution, Bergman emigrated to the United Kingdom in 1939. Before the war, he continued his business activities and provided employment for fellow Jewish and Czechoslovak refugees. In London, he worked with the Georgic Co-operative Society Ltd., an organisation that provided job opportunities for displaced individuals.

In November 1939, he was conscripted into the Czechoslovak Army in exile, but his recruitment was delayed multiple times due to his work. Eventually, he joined the Royal Air Force in March 1941 and was assigned to No. 312 Squadron RAF as a translator. He was later stationed at the Czechoslovak Air Depot in Wilmslow, RAF Exeter, and Fighter Command Headquarters, where he worked as an interpreter and translated intelligence documents and orders.

In September 1942, he was promoted to sergeant in the RAF and later to Warrant Officer. In 1943, he was assigned to Fighter Command Headquarters, where he translated orders and managed the personnel records of Czechoslovak pilots. He served in this capacity until the end of the war. For his service in the RAF, Bergman was awarded several honors, including the Czechoslovak War Cross, Czechoslovak Military Medal for Merit (2nd class), Czechoslovak Medal for Bravery, Czechoslovak Military Commemorative Medal, the British Defence Medal (United Kingdom), and the 1st Good Conduct Stripe.

== Post-war life ==
After the war, Bergman returned to Czechoslovakia, where he was one of the few surviving Jews from Trhová Kamenice, and the sole survivor of his family. He was appointed as the administrator of his family's former business, which had been confiscated by the Nazis. However, due to the communist takeover, he faced obstacles in reclaiming his enterprise.

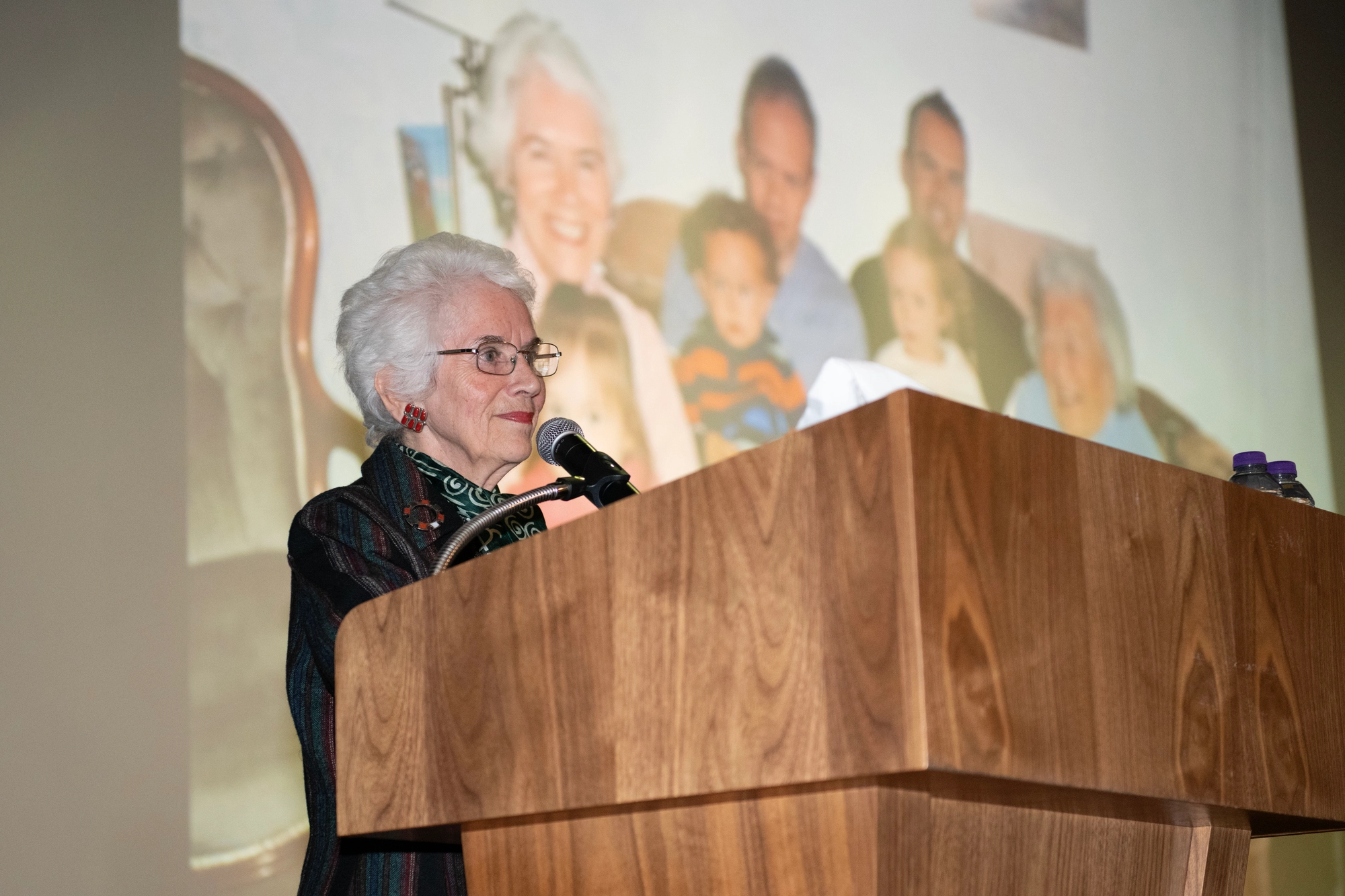
Bergman's Stepdaughter Eva Clarke, at a Holocaust Remembrance Week event at RAF Alconbury

In 1948, he married an old acquaintance, Anka Nathanová (née Kauderová), a widowed Holocaust survivor who had been interned in Theresienstadt and Auschwitz. She had given birth to a daughter, Eva Clarke, in Mauthausen days before the camp's liberation. Due to the 1948 communist coup d'état, shortly after their marriage the couple and Eva, whom Bergman adopted, sought to leave Czechoslovakia.

Bergman originally intended to emigrate with his new family to Canada, where he had a job offer in the textile industry. However, while traveling, he received an opportunity to work in Wales and decided to settle in the UK. He took a managerial position at Burry, Son & Co. Ltd. in Cardiff, which he later purchased in 1953, running the company for several decades. Throughout his later life, he remained active in supporting former Czechoslovak RAF members and Jewish refugees.

Bergman died in London on 14 September 1983 aged 81 while preparing for a trip to Switzerland and Czechoslovakia. His ashes were scattered at the Jewish cemetery in Dřevíkov, now in the Czech Republic. His adoptive daughter, Eva Clarke, regularly speaks for the Holocaust Educational Trust.
