= Josef Stehlík =

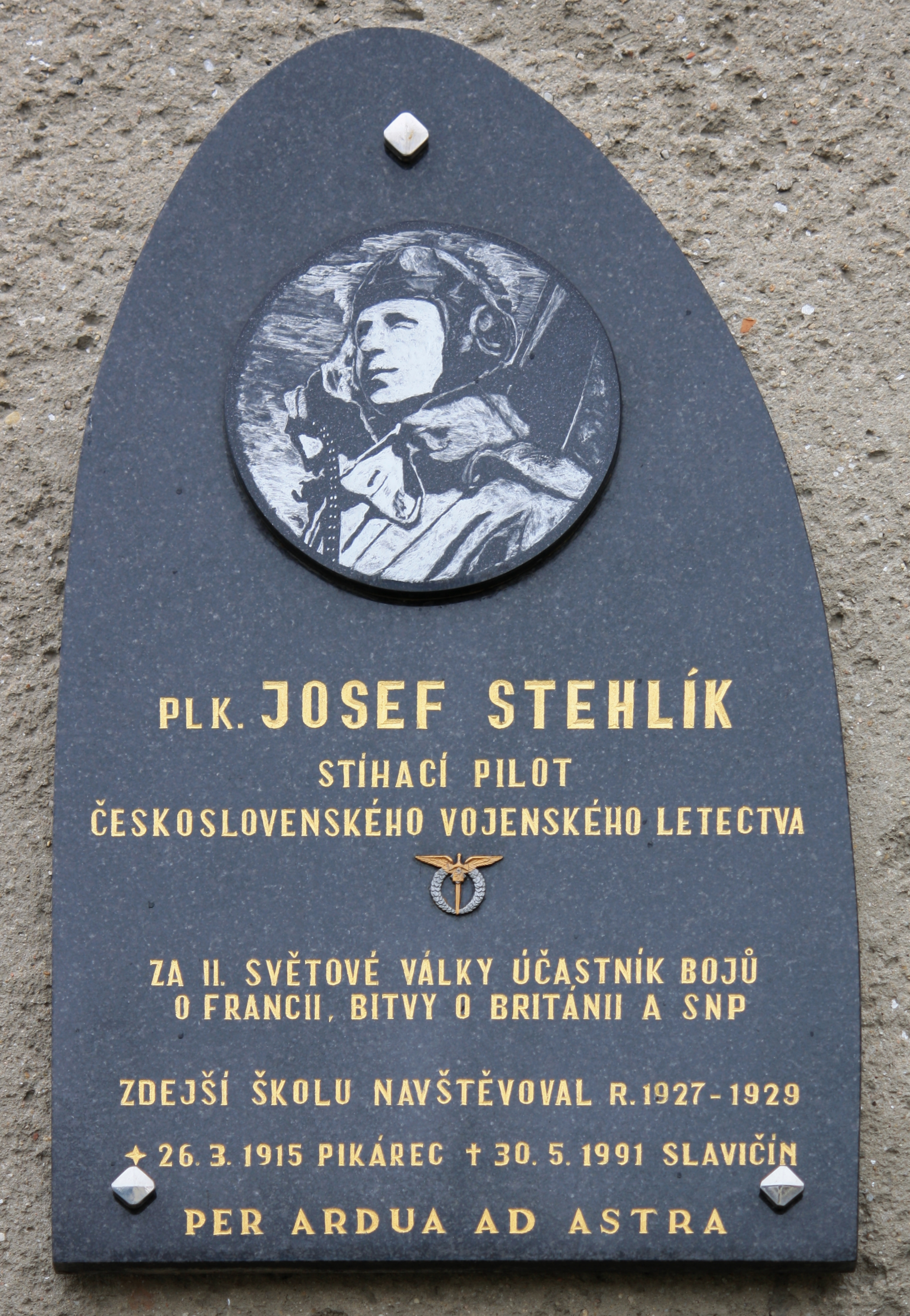
- Memorial plaque to Josef Stehlík at Strážek in the Czech Republic
- Born: 26 March 1915; Pikárec, Moravia, Austria-Hungary
- Died: 30 May 1991 (aged 76); Slavičín, Czechoslovakia
- Military career
- Allegiance: Czechoslovakia; France; United Kingdom; Czechoslovakia
- Branch: Czechoslovak Air Force; French Foreign Legion; Armée de l'Air; Royal Air Force; Czechoslovak Air Force
- Service years: 1936–48
- Rank: Colonel
- Units: 3rd Air Regiment; Groupe de Chasse III/3; No. 312 (Czechoslovak) Squadron RAF; 1st Czechoslovak Independent Fighter Air Regiment
- Commands: 1st Czechoslovak Independent Fighter Air Regiment
- Conflicts: World War II; Battle of France; Battle of Britain; Eastern Front; Slovak National Uprising
- Awards: Czechoslovak War Cross 1939–1945 × 5; Československá medaile Za chrabrost před nepřítelem × 3; Československá medaile za zásluhy 1st Class; Pamětní medaile československé armády v zahraničí; Řád Slovenského národního povstání I. třída; Pamětní medaile k 20. výročí osvobození Československa; Pamětní medaile k 20. výročí Slovenského národního povstání; Pamětní medaile M. R. Štefánika 3rd Class; Croix de guerre 1939–1945; Médaille militaire; Commemorative medal for voluntary service in Free France; 1939–1945 Star with Battle of Britain Clasp; Air Crew Europe Star; Defence Medal; War Medal 1939–1945; Medal "For the Victory over Germany in the Great Patriotic War 1941–1945"; Order of the Patriotic War, 2nd Class

Josef Stehlík (26 March 1915 – 30 May 1991) was a Czech fighter ace. In World War II he served in the French Air Force and then the Royal Air Force Volunteer Reserve. In 1944 he transferred to the Eastern Front, where he commanded the 1st Czechoslovak Independent Fighter Air Regiment.

Stehlík was a Czechoslovak Air Force pilot in the 1930s, latterly as a flying instructor. When Germany occupied and partitioned Czechoslovakia in 1939 he escaped via Poland to France. When France capitulated in 1940 Stehlík was evacuated to Britain, where he joined the Royal Air Force Volunteer Reserve.

Stehlík returned to Czechoslovakia in 1945 and resumed his Czechoslovak Air Force career until 1948, when the new Communist government politically purged armed forces personnel who had served in Western armed forces. Stehlík was remanded in prison for a year and demoted, but then released without charge.

Stehlík was restricted to civilian jobs until 1964, when the Communist government politically rehabilitated him and granted him a retired military rank. He died in post-Communist Czechoslovakia in 1991.

== Early life ==
Stehlík was born on 26 March 1915 in Pikárec. He went to school at Strážek near Bystřice nad Pernštejnem.

In 1936 Stehlík started pilot training at the Elementary Pilot School in Prague. In 1937 he studied at non-officer school and later at the fighter school at Hradec Králové. Until 1939 he was pilot instructor at the 3rd Air Regiment at Spišská Nová Ves in eastern Slovakia.

On 29 September 1938 France and the United Kingdom signed the Munich Agreement, which forced Czechoslovakia to cede the Sudetenland to Nazi Germany. On 15 March 1939 Germany occupied Czechoslovakia and imposed the Protectorate of Bohemia and Moravia, which the next day dissolved the Czechoslovak armed forces in its territory.

== In France ==
On 5 June 1939 Stehlík escaped across the border into Poland and thence travelled to France. On 3 September France and the UK declared war on Germany. On 17 November the French Government and Czechoslovak National Liberation Committee agreed that Czechoslovak airmen could join the French Air Force.

Stehlík was trained at Chartres airbase in central France. On 1 December he was posted to Groupe de Chasse III/3 which was equipped with Morane-Saulnier M.S.406C.1 fighter aircraft and later re-equipped with the more advanced Dewoitine D.520C.1. With these aircraft GC III/3 fought in the Battle of France. Stehlik he shot down four enemy aircraft solo and shared in shooting down four others.

== In Britain ==
On 22 June 1940 France capitulated to Germany. Stehlík and other Czechoslovak airmen were evacuated to the United Kingdom, where they were quickly enlisted in the RAF Volunteer Reserve. Stehlík was re-trained to fly Hurricane Mk I fighter and given the rank of sergeant. He was posted to the newly formed No. 312 (Czechoslovak) Squadron RAF, where he was allocated to Yellow Flight with Pilot Officer Alois Vašátko and led by Flight Lieutenant Denys Gillam.

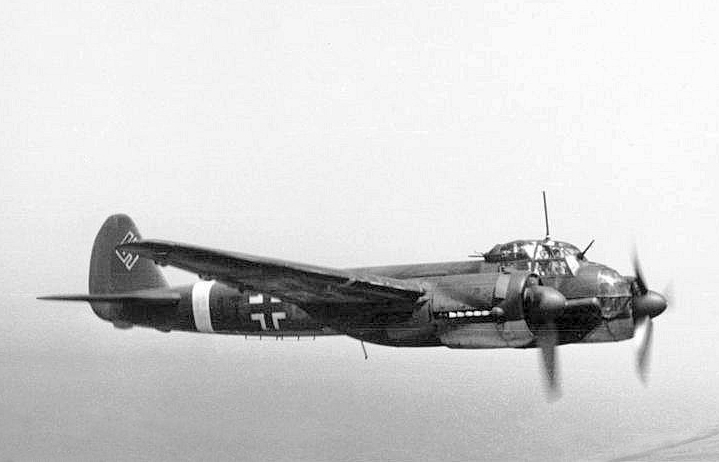
Stehlík shot down Junkers Ju 88 bombers both in Britain and on the Eastern Front

By October 1940 the squadron was stationed at RAF Speke outside Liverpool. About 16:00 hrs on 8 October a lone Luftwaffe Junkers Ju 88 medium bomber of Kampfgeschwader 2/806 was sighted flying up the River Mersey. Yellow Flight was scrambled, with Stehlík flying Hurricane L1807. All three fighters machine-gunned the Ju 88, killing its observer and setting fire to its two engines. At 16:15 the bomber made a forced landing in a field near Bromborough Dock and the surviving crew were captured.

On 14 March 1941 Stehlík shot down a Ju 88 over the sea. In raids over German-occupied France he damaged a Messerschmitt Bf 109 fighter and on 10 July 1941 probably shot down a Bf 109.

In October 1941 Stehlík was transferred from operation flying and trained at RAF Upavon to become a flying instructor. He was then posted to RAF Hullavington as an instructor. From January 1942 until February 1943 he served at Elementary and Secondary Flying Training Schools in Canada.

In April 1943 Stehlík returned to 312 Squadron, which had been re-equipped with the Supermarine Spitfire Mk VC. With 312 Squadron he flew several raids over occupied Europe.

== On the Eastern Front ==
Early in 1944 Stehlík joined the 1st Czechoslovak independent fighter aviation regiment in the Soviet Union. He was commissioned as a nadporuchik (senior lieutenant) and commanded the regiment's 1st Squadron.

From 15 September 1944 Stehlík was based at Tri Duby airfield in central Slovakia, fighting in the Slovak National Uprising. Flying a Soviet-built Lavochkin La-5FN fighter he shot down a Ju 88 on 19 September and shared in shooting down a Junkers Ju 87 ground-attack aircraft on 7 October.

== After the war ==
In post-war Czechoslovakia Stehlík resumed his peacetime air force career. After the 1948 Czechoslovak coup d'état the Communist authorities politically purged him from the air force. He was held in prison for a year and stripped of his rank but acquitted and released for lack of evidence.

By 1950 Stehlík was working at Pozemní stavby in Brno in southern Moravia. In 1963 he became a driver and luggage porter at the Lipová-lázně spa near Hrubý Jeseník in northern Moravia. In 1964 he was rehabilitated, his rank was restored and he returned to the air force. He retired as a colonel.

Stehlík died in Slavičín on 30 May 1991.

== Achievements and honours ==
Stehlík shot down 12 aircraft: five by himself and seven in collaboration with other airmen. He damaged one other aircraft and shared in probably shooting down another. He also destroyed two aircraft on the ground.

=== Awards ===
Stehlík was decorated by Czechoslovakia, France, the UK and the USSR. His decorations include:

Czechoslovak War Cross 1939–1945 five times
Československá medaile Za chrabrost před nepřítelem ("Bravery in Face of the Enemy") three times
Československá medaile za zásluhy, 1. stupně ("Medal of Merit, First Class")
Pamětní medaile československé armády v zahraničí ("Commemorative Medal of the Czechoslovak Army Abroad") with USSR bar
Řád Slovenského národního povstání I. třída ("Order of the Slovak National Uprising 1st Class")
Pamětní medaile k 20. výročí osvobození Československa ("Commemorative medal of the 20th Anniversary of the 20th Anniversary of the Liberation of Czechoslovakia")
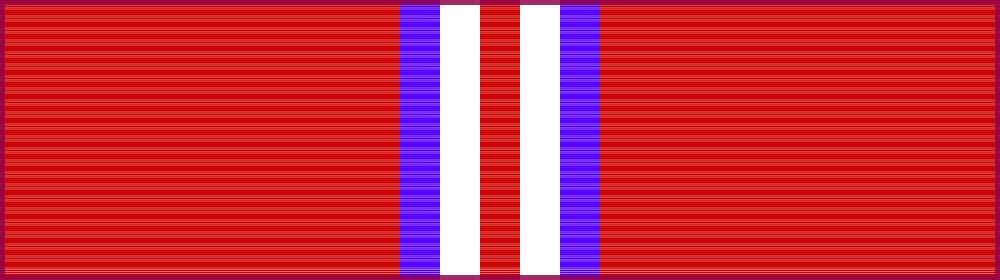
Pamětní medaile k 20. výročí Slovenského národního povstání ("Commemorative Medal for the 20th Anniversary of Slovak National Uprising")
Pamětní medaile M. R. Štefánika III. stupně ("MR Štefánik Commemorative Medal, 3rd Class")
Croix de guerre
Médaille militaire
Commemorative medal for voluntary service in Free France
1939–1945 Star with Battle of Britain clasp
Air Crew Europe Star
Defence Medal
War Medal 1939–1945
Medal "For the Victory over Germany in the Great Patriotic War 1941–1945"
Order of the Patriotic War, 2nd Class
