= Listed buildings in Brawby =

Brawby is a civil parish in the county of North Yorkshire, England. It contains two listed buildings that are recorded in the National Heritage List for England. Both the listed buildings are designated at Grade II, the lowest of the three grades, which is applied to "buildings of national importance and special interest". The parish contains the village of Brawby and the surrounding area. The listed buildings are in the village, and consist of a chapel and a farmhouse with an attached cottage.

== Buildings ==
Name and location	Photograph	Date	Notes
Manor Farmhouse and cottage 54.19322°N 0.86958°W	—	Early 18th century	The cottage is the earlier, with the farmhouse dating from the late 18th century. Both have pantile roofs with coped gables and shaped kneelers, and two storeys. The cottage is in stone with two bays. It contains replacement windows and a gabled half-dormer, and the entrance is at the rear. The house on the right is in stone at the front and in red brick elsewhere. It has three bays, the windows are pivoting, and all the openings have painted flat arches.
Ebenezer Chapel; 54.19417°N 0.86946°W		1838	The chapel is in sandstone and has a hipped slate roof. There is a single storey, a rectangular plan, and a front of three bays. The central doorway is flanked by sash windows, and there is a sash window in the right return. Over the doorway is a datestone with an inscription and the date in Roman numerals.
