= Czechoslovak armies in exile =

Czechoslovak armies in exile were the military formations loyal to the Czechoslovak government-in-exile during the German occupation of Czechoslovakia and included:

Poland

- Czechoslovak Legion (1939), unit operating in Poland in 1939

United Kingdom

- Czechoslovak 11th Infantry Battalion, unit operating under British command from 1940 to 1942
- 1st Czechoslovak Armoured Brigade, unit operating under British command from 1943 to 1945
- Czechoslovak RAF squadrons (310, 311, 312, and 313 Squadrons)

Soviet Union

- 1st Czechoslovak Army Corps in the USSR
- 1st Czechoslovak Mixed Air Division
