= Denys Gillam =

British flying ace of WWII

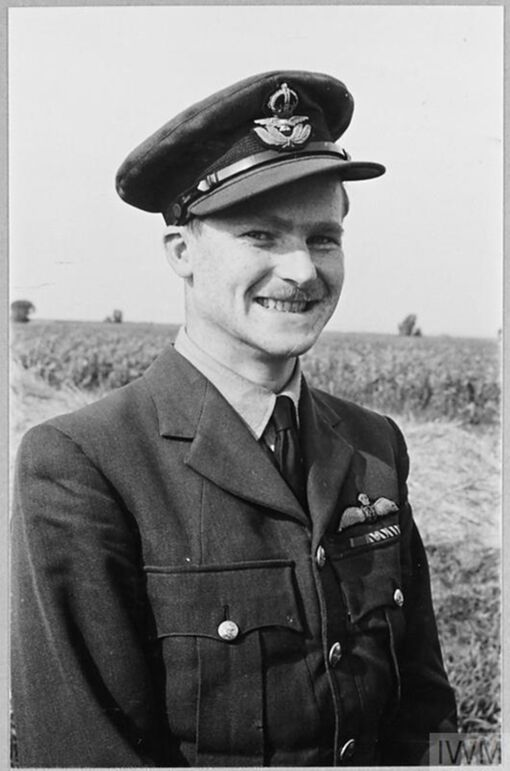
- Born: 18 November 1915; Tynemouth, England
- Died: September 1991 (aged 75); Brawby, England
- Military career
- Allegiance: United Kingdom
- Branch: Royal Air Force
- Service years: 1935–1945
- Rank: Group Captain
- Commands: No. 306 Squadron; No. 615 Squadron; Duxford Typhoon Wing; No. 146 Wing
- Conflicts: Second World War: Battle of France; Battle of Britain; Circus offensive; Dieppe Raid
- Awards: Distinguished Service Order & Two Bars; Distinguished Flying Cross & Bar; Air Force Cross; Mention in Despatches; Commander of the Order of Orange-Nassau (Netherlands)
- Other work: Businessman; Deputy Lieutenant for the West Riding of Yorkshire

Denys Edgar Gillam DSO & Two Bars, DFC & Bar, AFC, DL (18 November 1915–September 1991) was a British flying ace of the Royal Air Force (RAF) during the Second World War. He is credited with the destruction of at least eight aircraft.

From Tynemouth, Gillam joined the RAF in 1935. At the time of the outbreak of the Second World War, he was serving with No. 616 Squadron and flew in its operations over Dunkirk and in the subsequent Battle of Britain. Destroying a number of German aircraft during this time, he was awarded the Distinguished Flying Cross (DFC). For much of 1941, he held squadron commands, for which he was awarded a Bar to his DFC and the Distinguished Service Order (DSO). In August 1942, he was commander of the Hawker Typhoon wing at Duxford that flew in support of the Dieppe Raid. On either staff duties or training courses for much of the following 12 months, he then held a series of command posts, including a period leading No. 146 Wing. He was twice awarded a Bar to his DSO for his leadership of the wing in its operations. After the war, he was a businessman and farmer but also served in the Royal Auxiliary Air Force for a number of years. A Deputy Lieutenant for the West Riding of Yorkshire, he died in September 1991, aged 75.

== Early life ==
Denys Edgar Gillam was born on 18 November 1915 in Tynemouth in Northumberland, England. His schooling was across several educational facilities, including Bramcote College and Scarborough College, and latterly at Wrekin College in Shropshire. He was not a model student and was expelled from Wrekin for poor behaviour. He learnt to fly privately, gaining his pilots' licence from the Public School Aviation Camp in September 1934. Early the following year, he applied to join the Royal Air Force (RAF) on a short service commission. He commenced training at No. 6 Flying Training School at Netheravon in May.

When his training was completed in March 1936, Gillam was posted to No. 29 Squadron. This was based in Amiriya, in Egypt, and was equipped with Fairey Gordon light bombers which were used for patrolling duties. Gillam was confirmed as a pilot officer soon after his arrival there. The squadron returned to the United Kingdom in August and reequipped with Hawker Demon two-seater fighters. In January 1937 Gillam was posted to the Meteorological Flight that was based at Aldergrove, in Northern Ireland. During the course of his posting there, he had to twice fly a Westland Wapiti with supplies for the inhabitants of Rathlin Island which had been cut off by poor weather. For his efforts he was subsequently awarded the Air Force Cross in the 1938 Birthday Honours. By this time he was a flying officer, having been promoted to this rank late the previous year.

== Second World War ==
Shortly after the outbreak of the Second World War, Gillam was posted to No. 616 Squadron at Finningley and soon afterwards promoted to flight lieutenant. His new unit was a squadron of the Auxiliary Air Force, still relatively new, and Gillam was one of a few experienced pilots brought in to help bring it up to operational status. By early 1940, it was carrying out patrols along the East coast with its Supermarine Spitfire fighters from its base at Leconfield. In May it moved to Rochford and commenced patrolling over the beaches of Dunkirk from where the British Expeditionary Force was being evacuated from France. On 1 June, Gillam damaged a Junkers Ju 88 medium bomber over Dunkirk. After several days of operations, the squadron returned to Leconfield where it resumed its previous duties and occasionally had engagements with the Luftwaffe.

=== Battle of Britain ===
On 15 August, No. 616 Squadron was scrambled to intercept a Luftwaffe bombing raid launched from Norway and targeting Scarborough. Gillam destroyed a Ju 88, one of eight to have been shot down by the squadron's pilots. After The Hardest Day, it was moved south, to Kenley, as a reinforcement squadron for No. 11 Group. It flew extensively for the next two weeks. Gillam shot down a Messerschmitt Bf 109 fighter over Deal on 26 August and followed this up three days later with the destruction of a Messerschmitt Bf 110 heavy fighter 5 miles (8.0 km) north of Le Touquet. Becoming increasingly fatigued, at one point, during an evening scramble, Gillam fell asleep mid-flight but woke in time to prevent his aircraft from diving into the ground.

On 30 August, Gillam destroyed a Bf 109 near Redhill, and also probably destroyed a second and damaged two more over Eastchurch. The next day he shot down a Bf 109 over Canterbury. On 1 September he was again heavily engaged, shooting down a Dornier Do 17 medium bomber, probably destroying a second, and damaging a third, all to the south of Easterly. He also probably shot down a Bf 109 near Folkestone. By this time Gillam was a flight commander and agitated his seniors for the squadron to be rested for a week to recover from its losses; half its flying personnel had been killed, wounded or missing. The squadron's last day of operations in the south was 2 September, and after destroying a Bf 110 over Maidstone, Gillam's Spitfire was struck by return fire from another Bf 110. With his aircraft's engine on fire, he safely bailed out. No. 616 Squadron was withdrawn to the north the next day.

Gillam was transferred to No. 312 Squadron on 6 September. Staffed mostly by Czech flying personnel, this operated Hawker Hurricane fighters and was still working up to operational status. This was achieved on 2 October and it formed part of Liverpool's aerial defences. A flight commander while with the squadron, Gillam claimed the unit's first aerial victory, on 8 October. He had just taken off from the unit's airfield at Speke when he shared in the destruction of a Ju 88. His successes over the preceding months were recognised with an award of the Distinguished Flying Cross (DFC) in November. The citation, published in The London Gazette, read:

This officer has been responsible for the destruction of seven enemy aircraft and probably of four more, and has damaged six. On one occasion during a combat with a large force of Messerschmitt 110's, he shot one down and his own aircraft caught fire. He descended by parachute and returned to his station in time to lead the next patrol. On another occasion Flight Lieutenant Gillam shot down a Junkers 88 and landed within eleven minutes from the time he took off.

— London Gazette, No. 34989, 12 November 1940

=== Squadron command ===
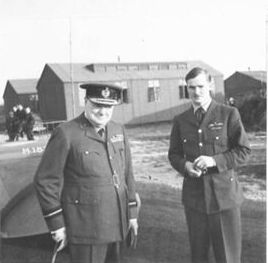
Gillam with British Prime Minister Winston Churchill, on the occasion of the latter's visit to No. 615 Squadron on 25 September 1941

In December 1940 Gillam was promoted to squadron leader and given command of No. 306 Squadron. This was based at Tern Hill and staffed with Polish pilots. There was few engagements during Gillam's tenure as commander, and the squadron was mostly involved in patrolling duties. Gillam led the squadron until March 1941, when he was rested from operations. He was then appointed as a staff officer at the headquarters of No. 9 Group, serving in this capacity until July, when he was given command of No. 615 Squadron. Based at Valley, this was tasked with patrolling duties across the Irish Sea but in September it moved to Manston with its Hurricanes for a two-month period when it carried out anti-shipping sorties to the French and Belgian coastline as part of the RAF's Circus offensive. On one sortie, carried out on 9 October, he destroyed a pair of Heinkel He 59 floatplanes on the water at Ostend. His role in No. 615 Squadron's successes saw Gillam awarded a Bar to his DFC later in the month. The published citation read:

Recently this officer's squadron has carried out 24 sorties against enemy shipping in which 11 ships were destroyed, 5 were left burning and 18 were damaged. Squadron Leader Gillam led the squadron on 10 of these missions and displayed outstanding courage and enthusiasm, taking every opportunity to seek and destroy enemy vessels.

— London Gazette, No. 35318, 21 October 1941

Gillam was shot down on 23 November, off the coast of Dunkirk. Wounded in the legs, he was collected by a Search & Rescue vessel dispatched from Goodwin Sands while his squadron provided aerial cover. Hospitalised for a time, he relinquished command of the squadron. During his period of recovery, he was awarded the Distinguished Service Order (DSO). The published citation read:

This officer has led the squadron with conspicuous success against enemy shipping which, escorted by armed ships, were passing through the Straits of Dover. He has participated in every attack and has displayed fine leadership and enterprise. Throughout, Squadron Leader Gillam has displayed great daring and he has set a magnificent example which has undoubtedly contributed materially to the notable successes achieved.

— London Gazette, No. 35378, 12 December 1941

=== Wing command ===
In January 1942, Gillam was sent to the United States to conduct a lecture tour for American flying personnel and on his return two months later, formed the first wing equipped with the new Hawker Typhoon fighter at Duxford. He was promoted to temporary wing commander at this time. The introduction to service of the Typhoon was troubled but by August Gillam's command included Nos. 56, 266 and 609 Squadrons. Its first major operation was in the Dieppe Raid of 19 August, when it was part of the aerial cover for the landings. Gillam led the wing on its first sortie of the day but this was uneventful. On a subsequent sortie in the afternoon, there was contact with the Luftwaffe and Gillam damaged a Focke Wulf 190 fighter over the English Channel. Gillam made one final sortie in the late afternoon but returned early with a loose panel on the wing of his aircraft.

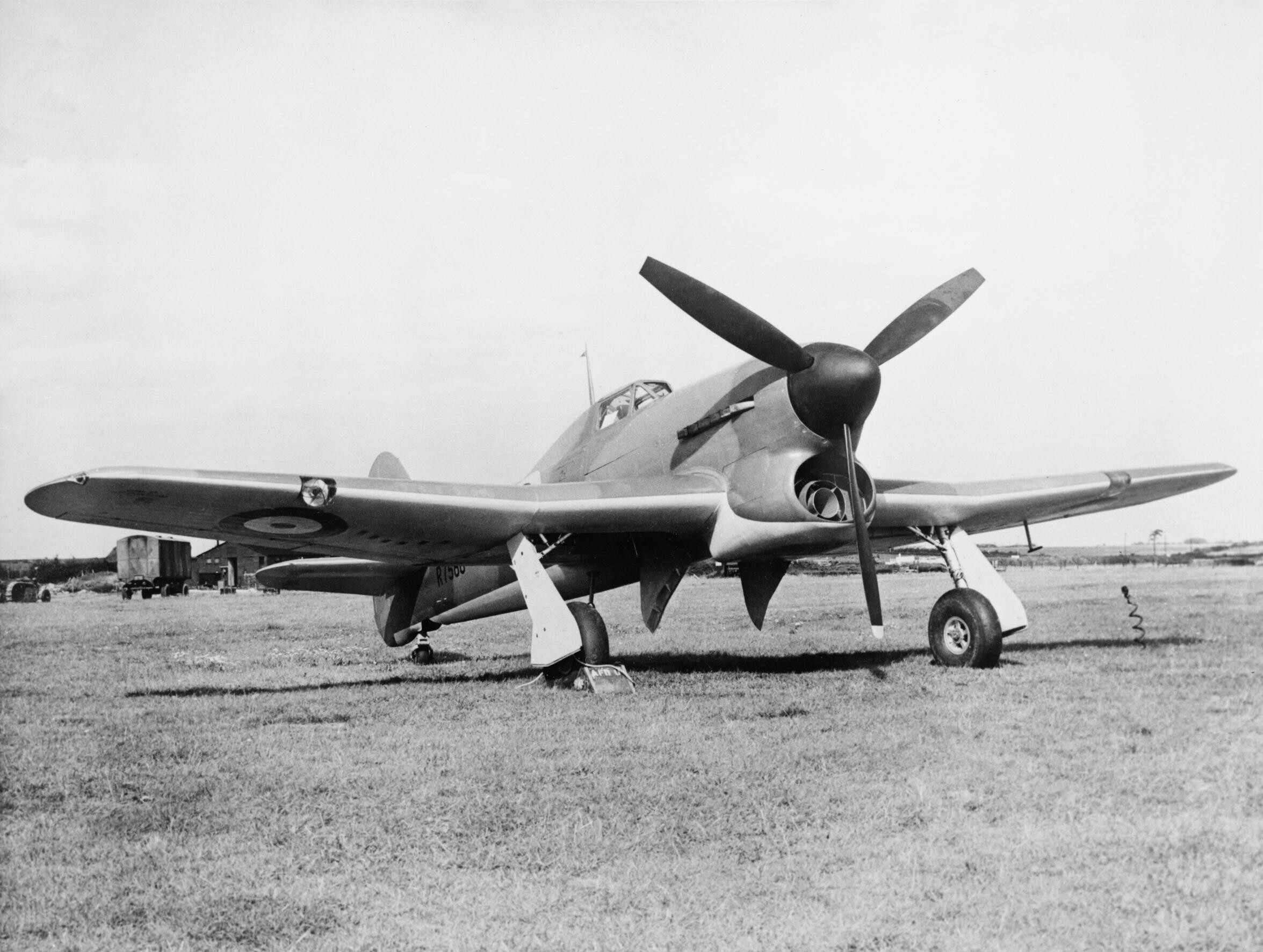
An early version of the Hawker Typhoon fighter at Duxford

In October Gillam was sent to the RAF Staff College at Andover and then, having been mentioned in despatches in the 1943 New Year Honours, was posted to No. 12 Group as a staff officer for six months. Further training, this time in the United States at the Command and General Staff School at Fort Leavenworth, followed. At the end of the year, he was appointed wing leader of No. 146 Wing. This was part of the RAF's Second Tactical Air Force (2TAF) and was involved in operations preparing for the Allied invasion of France. On 14 January 1944, he damaged a Fw 190 over Saint-Pol. Later in the month he became station commander at Tangmere, and subsequently from April, was commander of No. 20 Sector. He was promoted to acting group captain and given command of No. 146 Wing in July, which was operating from Advanced Landing Ground B3 in the Normandy beachhead. He was awarded a Bar to his DSO; the announcement was made in The London Gazette on 11 August.

On 24 October Gillam led a major operation involving several Typhoons to Dordrecht, where they destroyed a facility hosting several senior officers of the German 15th Army. As the lead pilot, he released the marker bombs at which the remaining Typhoon pilots aimed their ordnance. At least two German generals were killed, along with many other officers. In January 1945 Gillam was awarded a second Bar to his DSO. The published citation read:

Since being awarded a bar to the D.S.O., Group Captain Gillam has completed more than 80 sorties, involving attacks on enemy troop and tank concentrations, ammunition stores, locomotives and other targets on the ground. Within recent weeks, he has led formations of aircraft against several important and heavily defended targets. These missions called for a high degree of skill and resolution and the success achieved is a splendid tribute to this officer's outstanding leadership and ability. He has set an example of a very high order.

— London Gazette, No. 36905, 23 January 1945

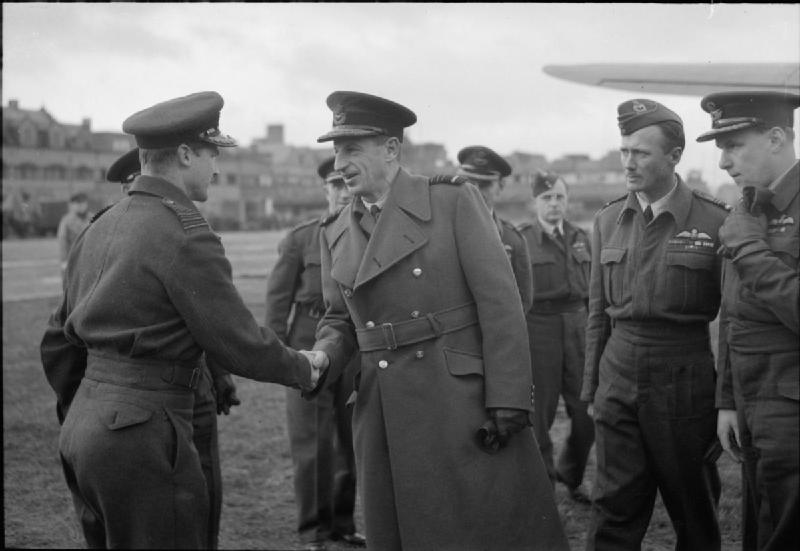
Gillam (left) greeting Marshal Charles Portal at the airfield at Deurne, Belgium, 1944

Posted to staff duties at the headquarters of No. 84 Group in February, Gillam was still serving in this role when the war ended. He was credited with having destroyed eight aircraft, one being shared with other pilots, plus two destroyed on the water. Three more aircraft were considered probably destroyed by Gillam and he is also credited with damaging six aircraft.

== Later life ==
Gillam left the RAF in October 1945 and commenced working for Homfrey & Co., his family's carpet business. In 1946 Gillam joined the Royal Auxiliary Air Force (RAuxAF) as a flight lieutenant. He was a member of his former unit, No. 616 Squadron. This was back at Finningley and equipped with de Havilland Mosquito fighters but was soon to reequipped with the Gloster Meteor jet fighter. In 1947, on account of his war service, he was appointed a Commander of the Order of Orange-Nassau, a Dutch honour.

By 1950, Gillam was a director of Homfrey & Co. He also farmed a property in North Yorkshire and in 1959 was appointed a Deputy Lieutenant for the West Riding of Yorkshire. At this time he was living at Rycliffe, in Halifax. Gillam relinquished his commission in the RAuxAF at the start of 1967. He was chairman of Homfrey & Co., when he retired in 1981. He died at Brawby in September 1991.
