= Emil Boček =

Last surviving World War II Czechoslovak RAF pilot

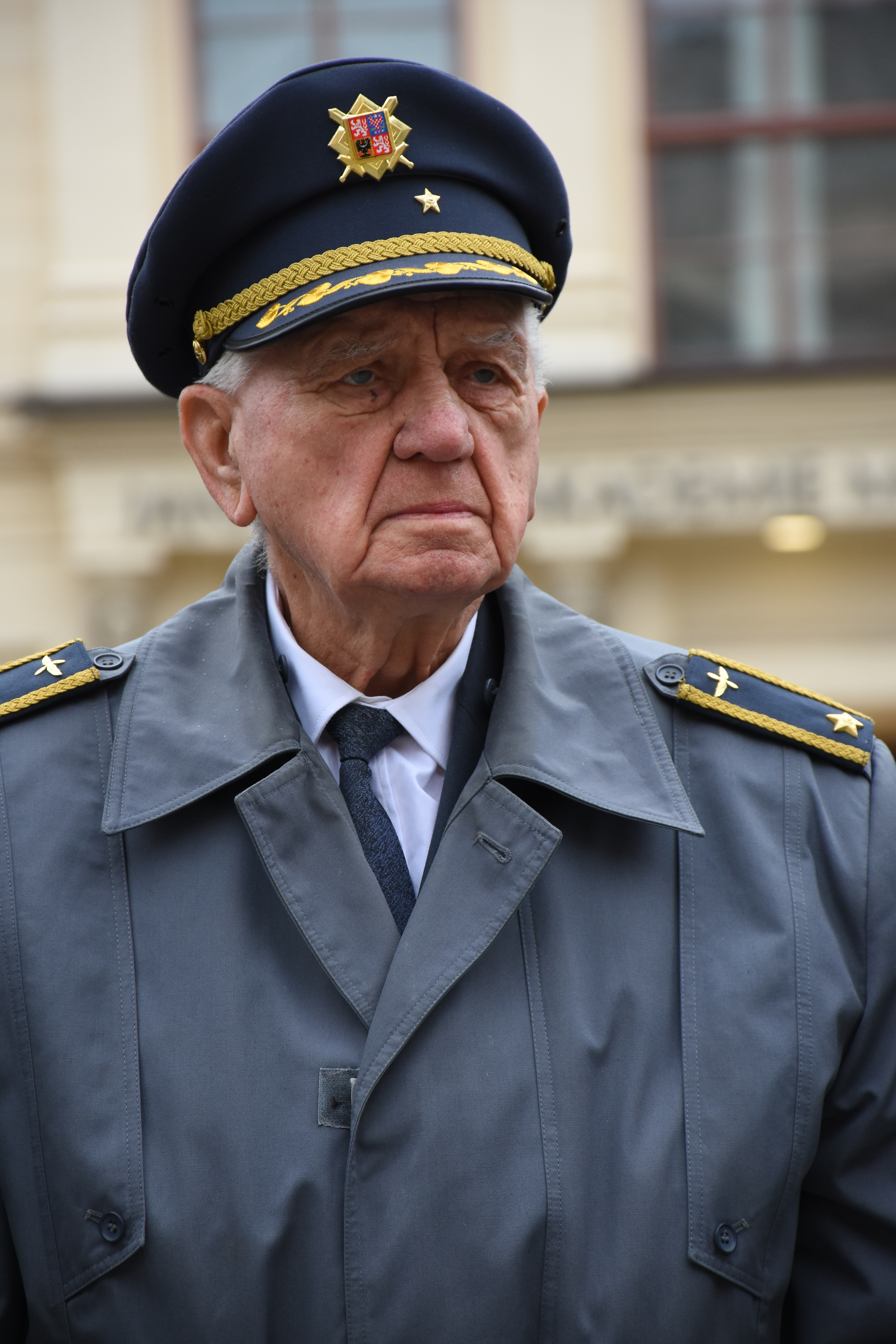
- Emil Boček in 2016
- Born: 25 February 1923; Brno, Czechoslovakia
- Died: 25 March 2023 (aged 100); Brno, Czech Republic
- Spouse: Eva Svobodová (m. 1951)
- Military career
- Allegiance: Czechoslovak government in exile United Kingdom; Czechoslovakia; Czech Republic
- Rank: Army general (Czech Republic)
- Unit: No. 312 (Czechoslovak) Squadron RAF
- Conflicts: World War II: Battle of France; Operation Dynamo; Battle of Britain
- Awards: Czechoslovak War Cross (1945); South Moravian Region Award (2015); City of Brno Award (2016); Honorary citizenship of Brno (2017); Complete list of decorations

Emil Boček (25 February 1923 – 25 March 2023) was a Czech World War II veteran and the last surviving Czechoslovak RAF pilot. He was appointed army general in 2019 by president Miloš Zeman.

== Early life ==
Emil Boček was born on February 25, 1923, in Brno, Czechoslovakia. He graduated from the municipal school in Brno-Tuřany. In September 1938, he began training to become a machine locksmith.

In late 1939, following the Nazi occupation of Czechoslovakia, Boček escaped the Protectorate of Bohemia and Moravia, joining the Czechoslovak foreign army in France.

== World War II ==
Boček reached Beirut and took part in the Battle of France in the summer of 1940. After the French surrendered, he was evacuated to Great Britain, where, in September 1940, he graduated from the Aircraft Mechanics Course and was accepted as one of the youngest members of the RAF.

He served first as an aircraft mechanic with the 312th Fighter Squadron. In 1943, he was on pilot training in De Winton and Medicine Hat, both in Alberta, Canada, and from October 1944, he served as a fighter pilot in squadron "B" of the No. 310 Squadron RAF fighter squadron. He had 26 operational flights and flew for a total of 73 hours and 50 minutes. His last combat action was on May 12, 1945, from Manston airfield.

On August 13, 1945, Boček landed with other pilots of the Czechoslovak fighter squadrons in Prague-Ruzyně. He was subsequently assigned to Air Regiment 2 in Prague-Kbely, and on December 1, 1945, he was promoted to sergeant of the Air Force in reserve.

As a member of the non-communist resistance, he became an inconvenience to the communists, who were in power at the time, and was discharged from the army at his own request on March 2, 1946.

== Life after the war ==
Boček owned a car repair shop in Brno, which in February 1948 he had to "voluntarily" nationalize and hand over to Mototechna, which then became his employer. This allowed him to escape persecution by the Czechoslovak Socialist Republic for his anti-communist views. At that time, he was also a very promising motorcycle racer.

In 1951, he married Eva Svobodová, with whom he had a son named Jiří and a daughter named Zuzana.

In 1958, he began working as a turner at the Institute of Instrumentation of the Czechoslovak Academy of Sciences, and from 1983 to 1988, he worked at the Drukov company. He retired in 1988.

== Life post-retirement ==
In April 1990, Boček was promoted to the rank of captain and, in October of the same year, was further promoted to the rank of major. In March 1993, he was subsequently promoted to the rank of retired colonel.

On March 23, 1996, he briefly met Queen Elizabeth II during her four-hour visit to Brno accompanied by the President of the Czech Republic, Václav Havel.

On October 28, 2010, President Václav Klaus awarded him the Order of the White Lion, III Class, due to his "extraordinary merit for the defence and security of the state and outstanding combat activity".

A documentary film about his life, called Nezlomný (English: Unbreakable), was made in 2012.

President Miloš Zeman appointed Boček to Brigadier General on May 8, 2014, to Major General on May 8, 2017, and on May 8, 2019, to Army General.

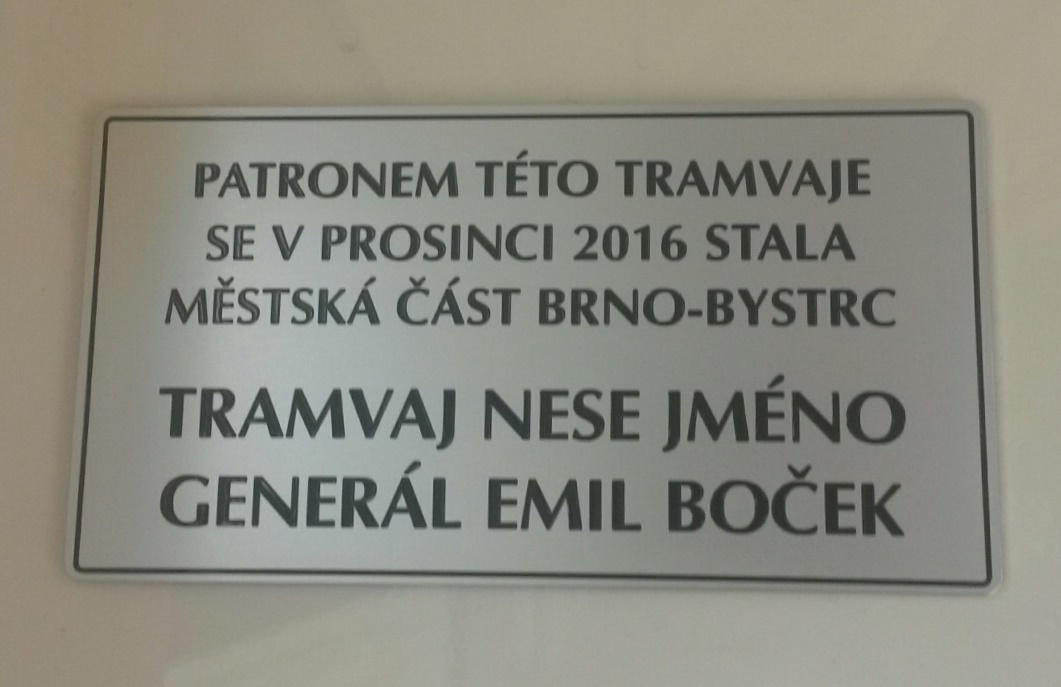
A plaque saying, "This tram bears the name of General Emil Boček"

In December 2016, one of the trams of the Brno City Transport Company was named after him, a suggestion of the Brno-Bystrc district.

On January 31, 2017, Boček received the 2016 City of Brno Award for Merit for Freedom and Democracy. He has also been an honorary citizen of Brno since December 2017.

On October 28, 2019, Boček was awarded the title of Order of the White Lion, I Class, by the President of the Republic Miloš Zeman.

On September 19, 2019, Kurt Taussig died, making Emil Boček the last surviving Czechoslovak pilot in the RAF during World War II.

Boček lived in Brno all his life, except during World War II. He was active in the Czechoslovak Legionary Community and the Association of Former Members of the RAF and actively participated in events in Brno.

He participated in several meetings, including one with Czech Technical University students and staff together with RAF airmen, organised after November 1989 by the Masaryk Academy of Labour, the Mechanical Engineering Society at CTU in Prague, and the European Movement in the Czech Republic in the large lecture room 256 in Prague-Dejvice.

Emil Boček died on March 25, 2023, at the age of 100 in Brno.

== Awards and decorations ==
- Order of the White Lion, I Class – Grand cross (2019)
- Order of the White Lion, III Class – Commander (2010)
- Czechoslovak War Cross 1939–1945, double receiver
- Medal "For Bravery Before the Enemy"
- Czechoslovak Medal of Merit, Second class
- Commemorative medals of the Czechoslovak army abroad
- Cross of Merit of the Minister of Defence of the Czech Republic, Third class
- Medal of Karel Kramář (2016)
- 1939–1945 Star
- Air Crew Europe Star
- France and Germany Star
- British Defence Medal
- War Medal 1939–1945
- Ribbon for the 60th anniversary of the end of World War II award
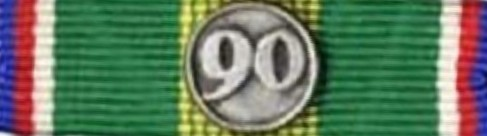
- Ribbon of the 90th anniversary of the Czechoslovak republic
- Commemorative Medal for the 20th Anniversary of the Liberation of the Czechoslovak Socialist Republic
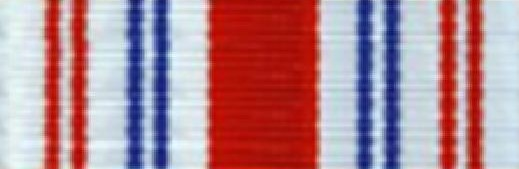
- Commemorative medal for participation in the fight against fascism and for the liberation of the Czechoslovak homeland
- Commemorative medal of the CSOL "1914–1918 / 1939–1945"
- Commemorative Medal of CSOL, Third Class
- Commemorative medal 100 years of CSOL (2021)
- The Grand Cross of the Canons Regular of the Penitence of the Blessed Martyrs

== Bibliography ==
- Jiří Plachý: Emil Boček, Strach jsem si nepřipouštěl, Jota, Brno, 2018
- Audiokniha Jiří Plachý: Emil Boček, Strach jsem si nepřipouštěl, Jota an Audiotéka, 2018
- Memory of nations: Emil Boček
