= Miroslav Štandera =

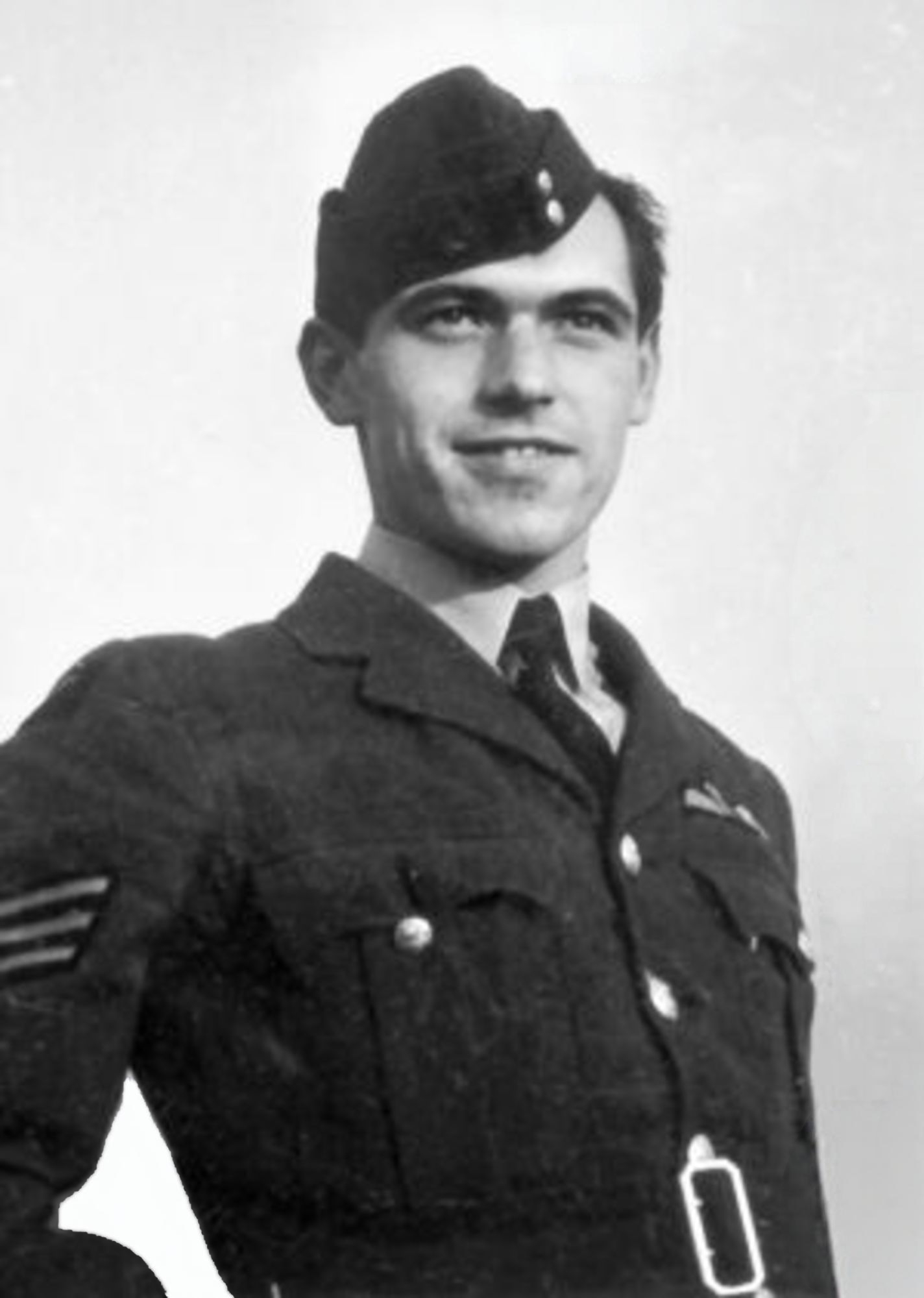
Štandera in 1914.

Miroslav Štandera (5 October 1918 – 19 February 2014) was a Czech fighter pilot who flew combat missions for the French Air Force and the Royal Air Force during World War II. Štandera was one of the final two surviving Czech combat pilots who flew for the Allies throughout the entire period of World War II. He was also the last surviving Czech pilot who had flown for France during the war.

== Biography ==
=== Early life ===
Štandera was born on 5 October 1918. In 1936, he enlisted in the Czechoslovak Air Force and became an air force pilot after completing aviation school.

=== World War II ===
He fled from Czechoslovakia to France in 1939 following the German invasion and occupation of the country. Standera joined the French Air Force and fought against the Nazi German pilots during the invasion of France in May 1940. In June 1940, Štandera was seriously wounded during an aerial dogfight, but survived the crash landing.

Štandera was evacuated to the United Kingdom for medical treatment following the Fall of France. There he became one of the founding members of the No. 312 (Czechoslovak) Squadron RAF, a Royal Air Force squadron made up of exiled Czechoslovak fighter pilots. In 1940, he was one of 87 Czechoslovak fighter pilots who defended the United Kingdom during the Battle of Britain.

He piloted twin-engine fighter bombers for nighttime bombing raids into Germany and occupied France throughout the war. In total, Štandera flew 1,320 hours of combat during World War II. He also protected the air space over Allied forces during the Invasion of Normandy in June 1944.

=== Post-war life and career ===
Miroslav Štandera returned to his native Czechoslovakia following the end of World War II. However, he was expelled from the Czechoslovak Air Force by the new Communist government after the 1948 Czechoslovak coup d'état. The Czechoslovak Socialist Republic was seeking to purge members of the armed forces who had served for Western European countries during the war. Štandera fled to the United Kingdom in 1948, where he rejoined the Royal Air Force. Štandera retired from the Royal Air Force (RAF) in 1955.

Štandera became a silversmith in Britain after retiring from the RAF. He took and apprenticeship and repaired silver teapots. He retired in the early 1980s.

In 1984, Štandera moved from Britain to Bavaria, West Germany. He returned to the Czech Republic in 1994 to live with his daughter's family in Plzeň.

In 2000, Czech president Václav Havel bestowed Štandera with the honorary rank of brigadier general. He also received two Czechoslovak War Crosses and three Czechoslovak Bravery Medals for his service during World War II. In 2006, he was honored with the Order of Tomáš Garrigue Masaryk.

Miroslav Štandera died in Plzeň, Czech Republic, on 19 February 2014, at the age of 94. His death was announced by officials from the Plzeň city hall. His funeral was held at the Cathedral of St. Bartholomew in Plzeň on 26 February 2014.
