= Pikárec =

- Municipality
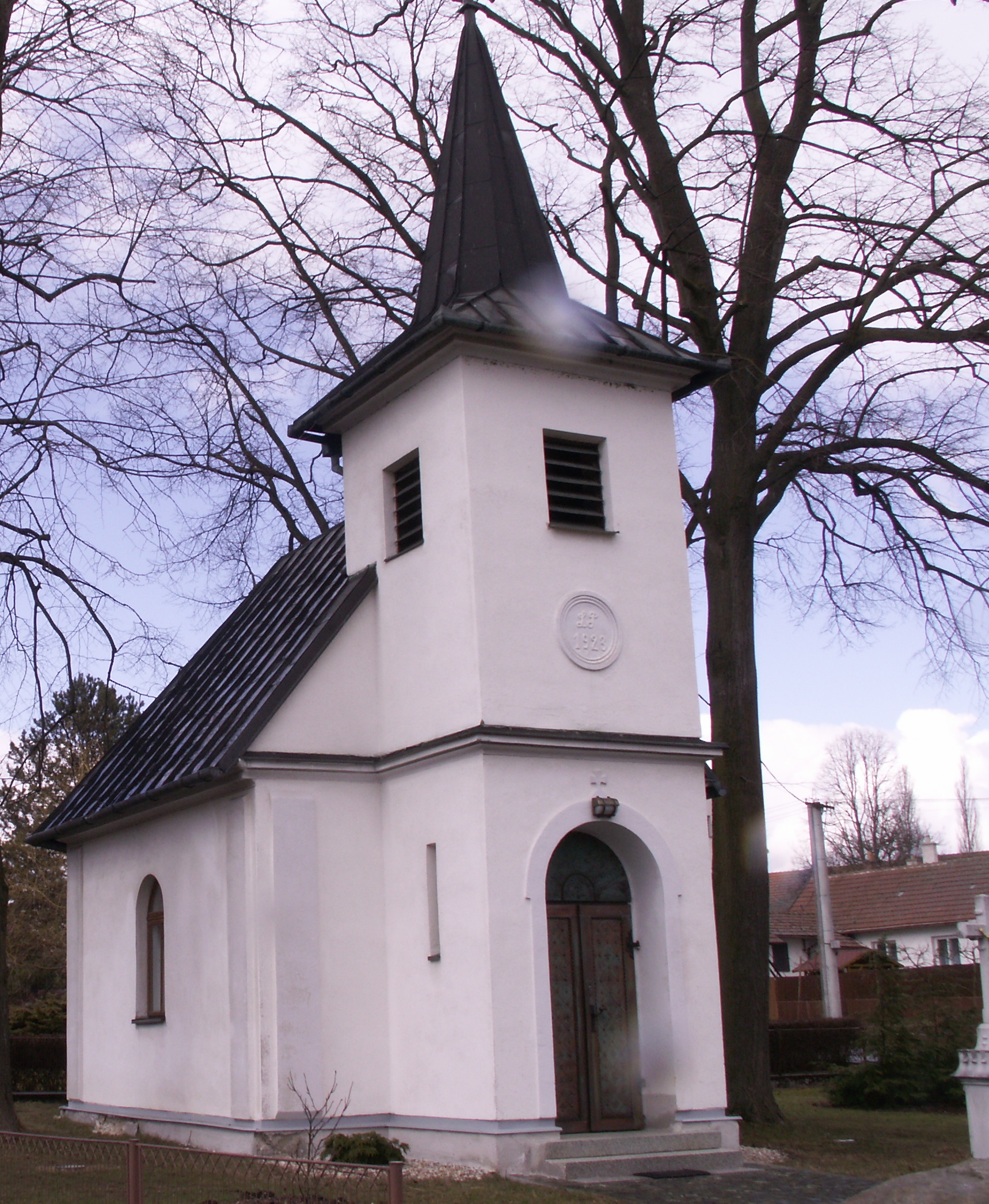
- Chapel of Saint Procopius

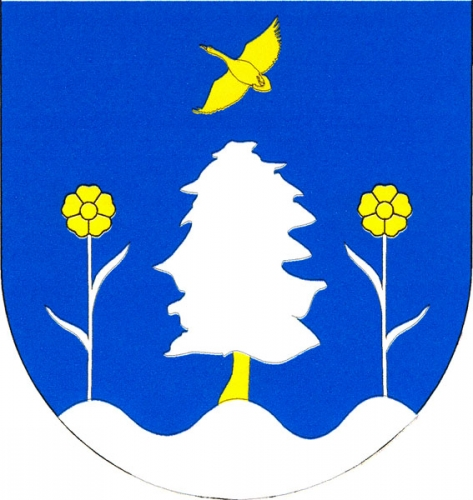
- Flag Coat of arms

- Location in the Czech Republic
- Coordinates: 49°25′57″N 16°7′21″E
- Country: Czech Republic
- Region: Vysočina
- District: Žďár nad Sázavou
- First mentioned: 1436

Area
  - Total: 8.46 km^{2} (3.27 sq mi)
- Elevation: 543 m (1,781 ft)

Population (2026-01-01)
  - Total: 336
  - Density: 39.7/km^{2} (103/sq mi)
- Time zone: UTC+1 (CET)
  - Summer (DST): UTC+2 (CEST)
- Postal code: 592 53
- Website: www.pikarec.cz

Pikárec is a municipality and village in Žďár nad Sázavou District in the Vysočina Region of the Czech Republic. It has about 300 inhabitants.

Pikárec is about 20 kilometres (12 mi) southeast of Žďár nad Sázavou, 39 km (24 mi) east of Jihlava, and 142 km (88 mi) southeast of Prague.

== Demographics ==
Historical population
Year	Pop.	±%
1869	425	—
1880	404	−4.9%
1890	417	+3.2%
1900	386	−7.4%
1910	396	+2.6%
1921	359	−9.3%
1930	343	−4.5%
1950	293	−14.6%
1961	325	+10.9%
1970	318	−2.2%
1980	295	−7.2%
1991	277	−6.1%
2001	299	+7.9%
2011	303	+1.3%
2021	314	+3.6%
Source: Censuses

== Notable people ==
- Josef Stehlík (1915–1991), fighter pilot
