= Anka Bergman =

Czech Holocaust survivor (1917–2013)

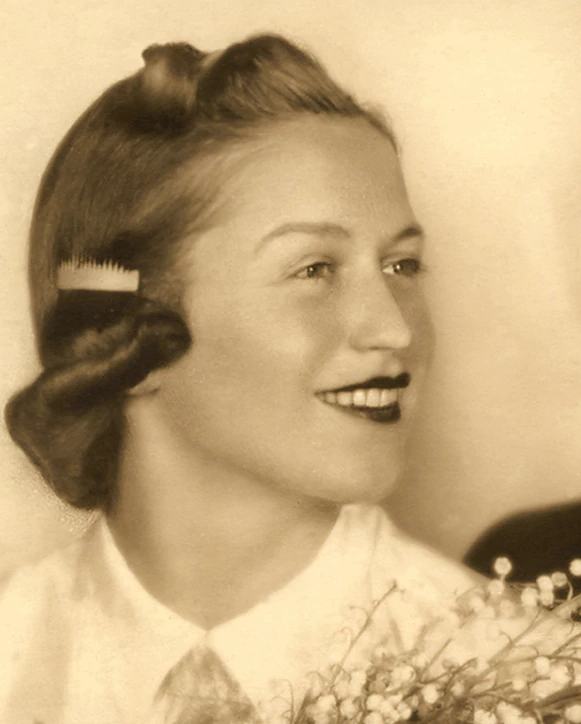
- Bergman in 1940
- Born: Anna Kaudrová; 20 April 1917; Třebechovice, Austria-Hungary
- Died: 17 July 2013 (aged 96); Cambridge, United Kingdom
- Other name: Anka Nathanová
- Spouses: Bernd Nathan (m. 1940; died 1945) Karel Bergman (m. 1948; died 1983)
- Children: 2; including Eva Clarke

Anka Bergman (née Kaudrová; 20 April 1917 – 17 July 2013) was a Czech Holocaust survivor noted for giving birth to a daughter, Eva Clarke, whilst at Mauthausen concentration camp.

== Early life ==
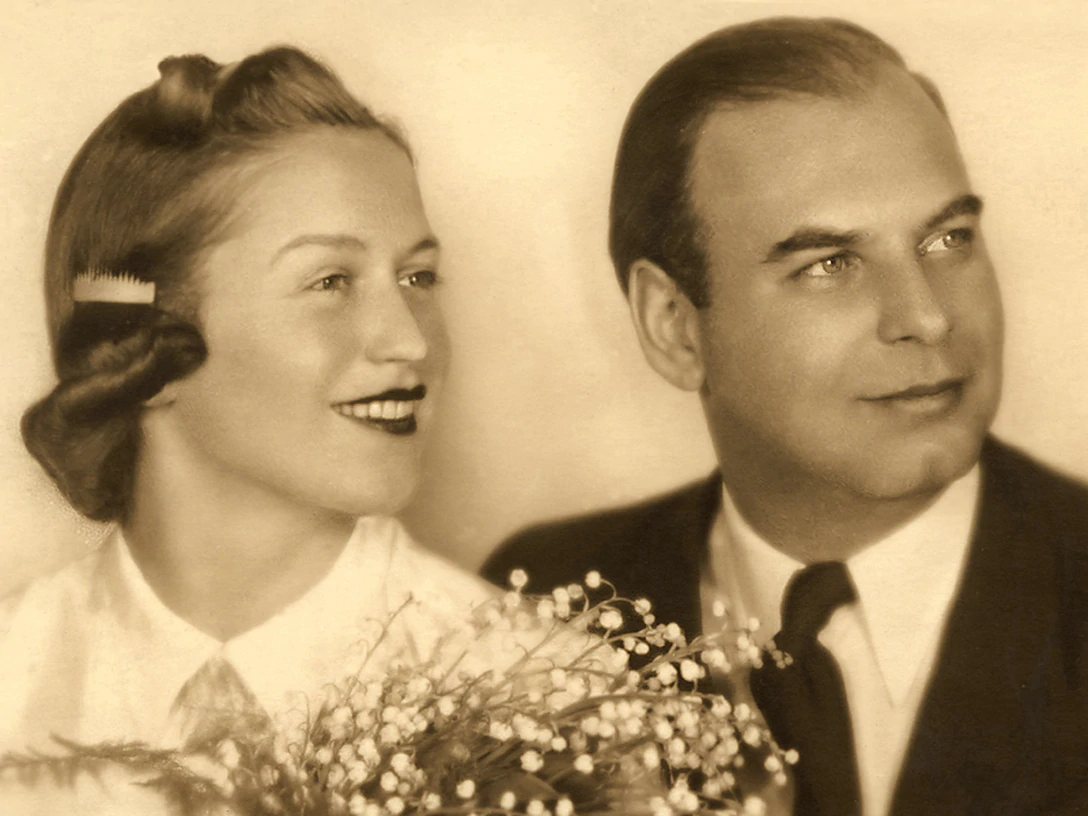
Bergman and Bernd Nathan's wedding picture in May 1940

Anka Kaudrová was born in 1917 in the town of Třebechovice, in the present-day Czech Republic. She grew up with her parents and two brothers and sisters. They were raised as Jewish but not religious. After attending a boarding grammar school, she studied law at Prague University. As the Nazis took control in 1939, they closed universities and Bergman got a job as a hatmaker. On 15 May 1940 she married Bernd Nathan, an architect. He previously moved to Prague from Germany in an attempt to escape Nazi control. As restrictions grew they were forced to wear a yellow badge.

== The Holocaust ==
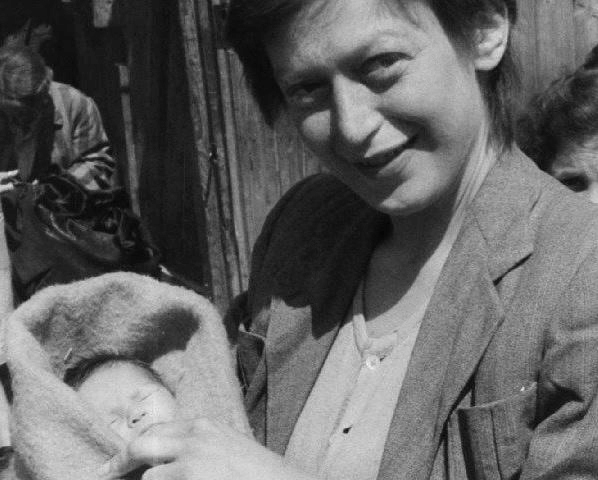
Bergman and her daughter, Eva Clarke, at Mauthausen on 11 May 1945

In November 1941 they were ordered to a warehouse near Holešovice station in Prague. Anka and Bernd were separated, and Anka was sent to Theresienstadt, which at the time was an old barracks transformed into a Nazi ghetto. She got a job there at a provisions store so she could help feed the fifteen members of her extended family transported to the same ghetto. After some time Anka was able to find her husband, and have a baby in 1944, George (Dan). The Gestapo forced her to sign a document that if her son was born, he would be killed, but he died at two months old of pneumonia.

In September 1944 Bernd was sent to Auschwitz-Birkenau. Anka was pregnant again, and, not knowing the camp, volunteered to join him. Upon arriving in October, she was again separated from Bernd, who would later be shot in a death march by the Nazis on 18 January 1945. Anka, malnourished and keeping her pregnancy secret, was selected for slave labour in an armaments factory near Dresden, Germany. She was so malnourished upon being evacuated to the countryside for the Mauthausen concentration camp, she credits a farmer who offered her a glass of milk for her survival. She would have been sent to the gas chambers if they were not blown up the day before. Here she gave birth to her daughter Eva Clarke. Six days later the camp was liberated by American forces.

During her time in these ghettos and camps, music from performers who were also captured helped motivate people to go on. Anka's favourite was the opera The Bartered Bride by the Czech composer Smetana.

== Later life ==
She returned to Prague to stay with a surviving cousin. Her husband, parents, and two sisters were murdered at Auschwitz. In Prague in February 1948, Anka married an old acquaintance, Karel Bergman, a Czechoslovak Jew and former Royal Air Force interpreter who had previously escaped to the United Kingdom in 1939.

In September 1948, following the Communist takeover, the family left Czechoslovakia intending to emigrate to Canada, but a job offer for Karel in Wales allowed the family to move instead in the United Kingdom. In Cardiff, Anka Bergman would often give talks on her experiences. Karel Bergman died in 1983, and Anka remained in Wales until 2010, when she moved to Cambridge to be near Eva.

Anka Bergman died on 17 July 2013. Her daughter, Eva Clarke, regularly speaks for the Holocaust Educational Trust.
