= Brawby =

Village and civil parish in North Yorkshire, England

Coordinates: 54.19361°N 0.87040°W

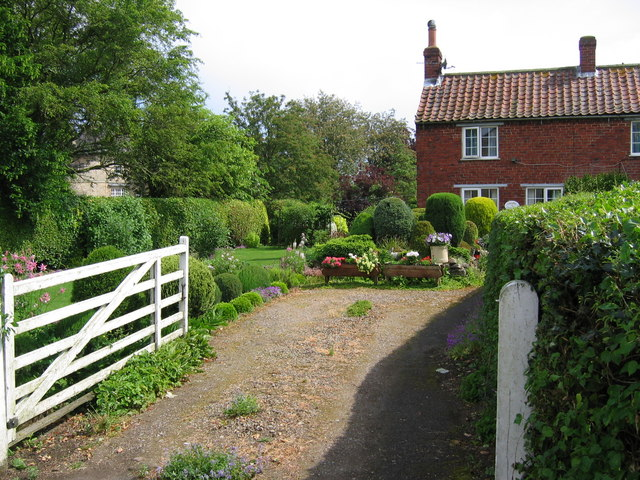
- A cottage in Brawby

- Location within North Yorkshire
- Population: 140 (2011 census)
- OS grid reference: SE737781
- Civil parish: Brawby
- Unitary authority: North Yorkshire
- Ceremonial county: North Yorkshire
- Region: Yorkshire and the Humber
- Country: England
- Sovereign state: United Kingdom
- Post town: Malton
- Postcode district: YO17
- Police: North Yorkshire
- Fire: North Yorkshire
- Ambulance: Yorkshire
- UK Parliament: Thirsk and Malton

Brawby is a village and civil parish in North Yorkshire, England, situated at the confluence of the River Seven and the River Rye. According to the 2001 census Brawby had a population of 164, decreasing to 140 at the 2011 Census.

It was part of the Ryedale district between 1974 and 2023. It is now administered by North Yorkshire Council.

== Geography ==
Brawby is located on the edge of the North York Moors, about 8 miles (13 km) south-west of Pickering, and 8 miles (13 km) north-west of Malton. Although Brawby is located in a quiet rural area of North Yorkshire, Kirby Misperton is only 4 miles (6.4 km) away, and is the site of one of the most popular Zoo and Theme parks in England, Flamingoland.

== Entertainment ==
The Shed, a live music venue, offers both live music and performance art and attracts artists from all over the world. It was founded in 1992 by Simon Thackray.

== See also ==
- Listed buildings in Brawby
