= Trhová Kamenice =

- Market town
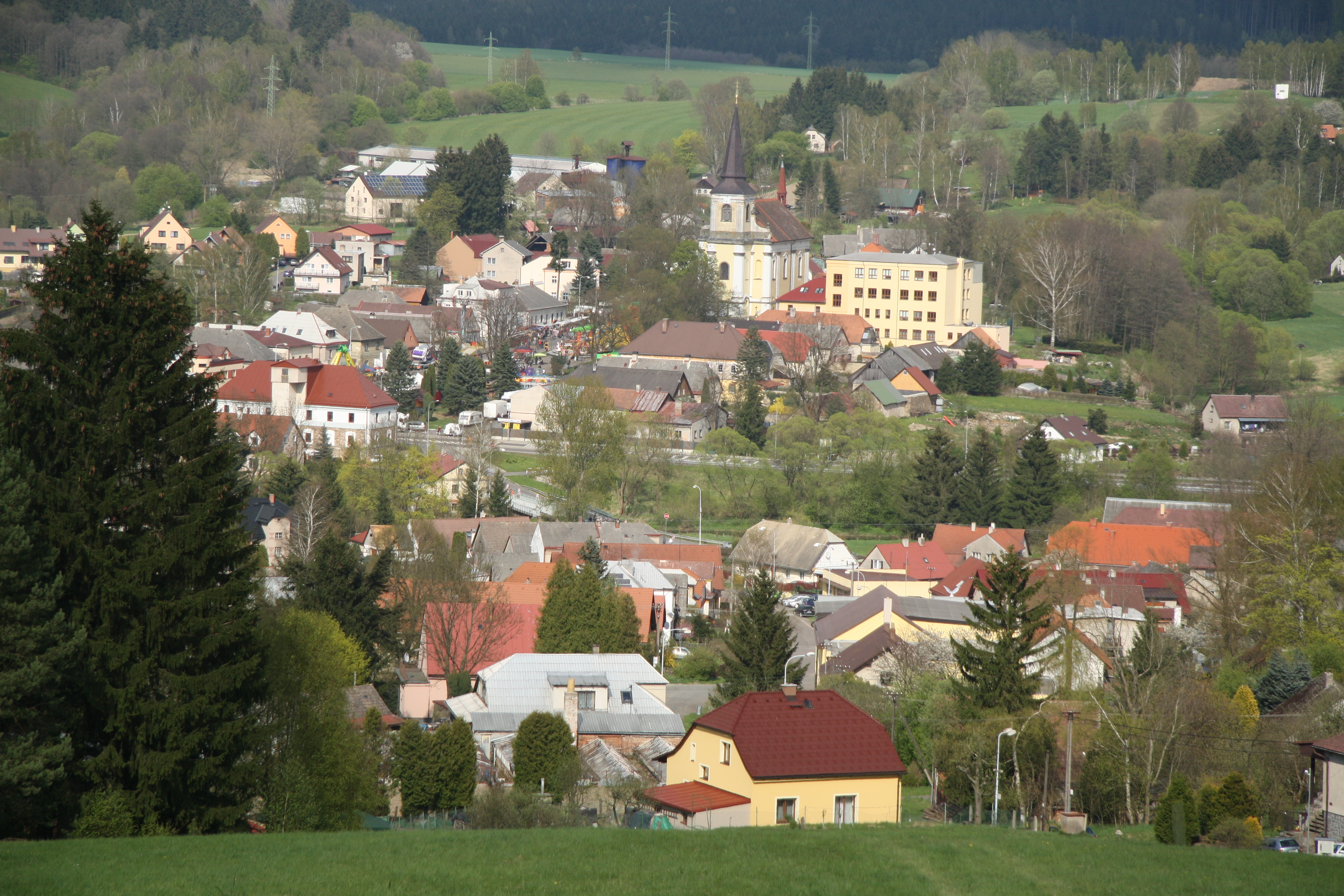
- General view

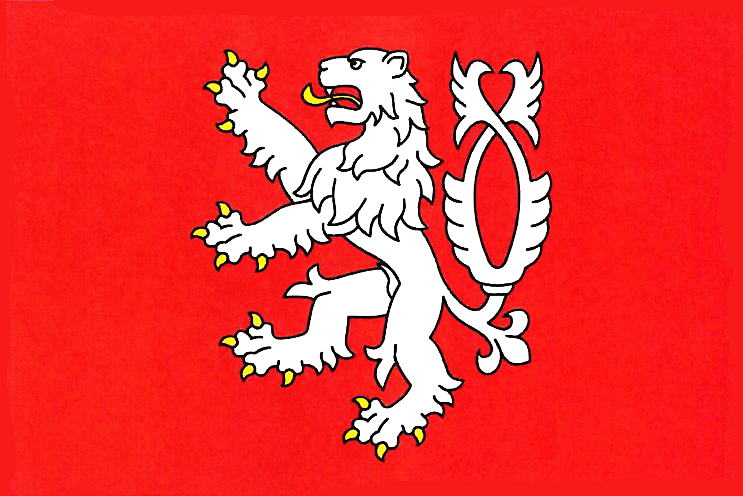
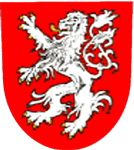
- Flag Coat of arms

- Location in the Czech Republic
- Coordinates: 49°47′19″N 15°49′1″E
- Country: Czech Republic
- Region: Pardubice
- District: Chrudim
- First mentioned: 1439

Area
  - Total: 20.40 km^{2} (7.88 sq mi)
- Elevation: 535 m (1,755 ft)

Population (2026-01-01)
  - Total: 1,007
  - Density: 49.36/km^{2} (127.8/sq mi)
- Time zone: UTC+1 (CET)
  - Summer (DST): UTC+2 (CEST)
- Postal codes: 538 25, 539 01, 539 52
- Website: www.trhovakamenice.cz

Trhová Kamenice (Czech pronunciation: [ˈtr̩ɦovaː ˈkamɛɲɪtsɛ]) is a market town in Chrudim District in the Pardubice Region of the Czech Republic. It has about 1,000 inhabitants.

== Administrative division ==
Trhová Kamenice consists of seven municipal parts (in brackets population according to the 2021 census):

- Trhová Kamenice (766)
- Hluboká (15)
- Kameničky (30)
- Petrkov 3.díl (6)
- Polom (0)
- Rohozná (94)
- Zubří (8)

== Etymology ==
Kamenice is a former name of the Chrudimka River, which was transferred to the settlement. Around 1500, after the settlement obtained the right to hold markets (trhy in Czech), it began to be called Trhová Kamenice.

== Geography ==
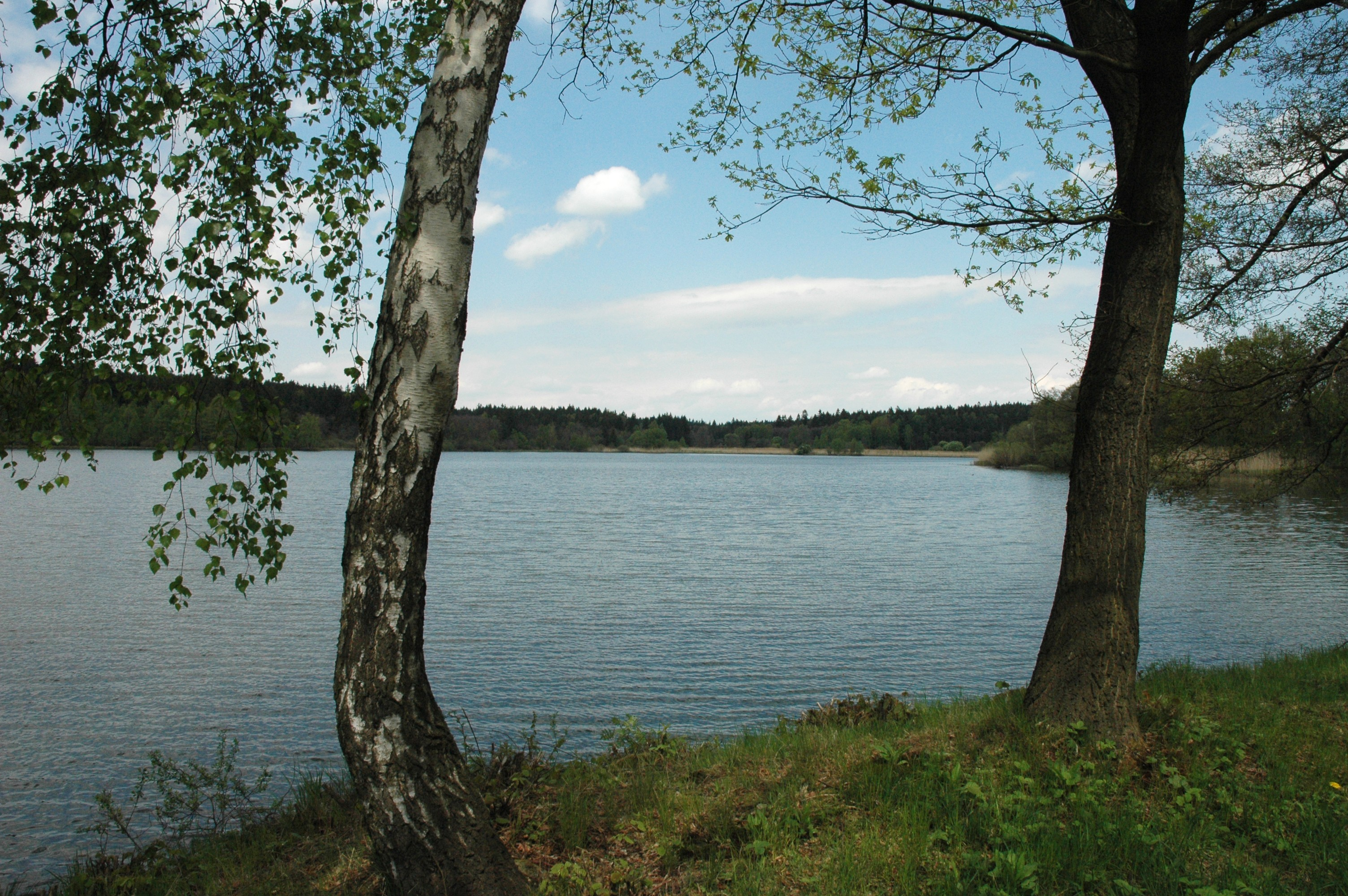
Strádovka Nature Reserve

Trhová Kamenice is located about 18 kilometres (11 mi) south of Chrudim and 27 km (17 mi) south of Pardubice. It lies in the Iron Mountains and in the eponymous protected landscape area. The highest point is the hill Zuberský vrch at 651 m (2,136 ft) above sea level.

Trhová Kamenice is situated on the Chrudimka River. The municipal territory is rich in fishponds. The largest pond in Trhová Kamenice and in the entire Iron Mountains is Rohozenský velký rybník, which forms half of the 46-hectare (110-acre) large Strádovka Nature Reserve.

== History ==
The first written mention of this area is in a donation deed from 1242. A settlement was founded here probably by the monastery in Vilémov. At the end of the 14th century, the ironworks were founded and the production of charcoal started. In the 15th century, the economical development occurred and in 1499, Trhová Kamenice became a market town.

On 8 May 1945, when Trhová Kamenice was under Nazi occupation, several Nazi troops were passing through the market town from Chrudim back to Nazi Germany and massacred 14 people while finding resistance partisans.

== Demographics ==
Historical population

Year	Pop.	±%
1869	2,080	—
1880	2,132	+2.5%
1890	1,968	−7.7%
1900	2,014	+2.3%
1910	2,092	+3.9%

Year	Pop.	±%
1921	1,945	−7.0%
1930	2,044	+5.1%
1950	1,382	−32.4%
1961	1,315	−4.8%
1970	1,147	−12.8%

Year	Pop.	±%
1980	922	−19.6%
1991	870	−5.6%
2001	864	−0.7%
2011	903	+4.5%
2021	919	+1.8%

Source: Censuses

== Transport ==
The I/37 road, which connects Hradec Králové and Pardubice with the D1 motorway, runs through the market town.

== Sights ==
The main landmark of Trhová Kamenice is the Church of Saints Philip and James. It was built in the Baroque style in 1737–1747. The interior is decorated with Neoclassical frescoes from the 1790s.

== Notable people ==
- František Šmahel (1934–2025), historian
