= No. 312 (Czechoslovak) Squadron RAF =

Defunct flying squadron of the Royal Air Force

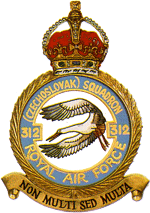
- Badge of № 312 (Czechoslovak) Squadron RAF
- Active: 29 August 1940 – 15 February 1946
- Country: United Kingdom
- Allegiance: (Czech Republic) Czechoslovakia
- Branch: Royal Air Force
- Role: Fighter Squadron
- Part of: RAF Fighter Command
- Nickname(s): Czechoslovak
- Motto(s): Latin: Non Multi Sed Multa ("Not many, but much")
- Engagements: Dieppe Raid; Normandy landings

Insignia
- Squadron Badge: A stork volant
- Squadron Codes: DU (August 1940 – February 1946)

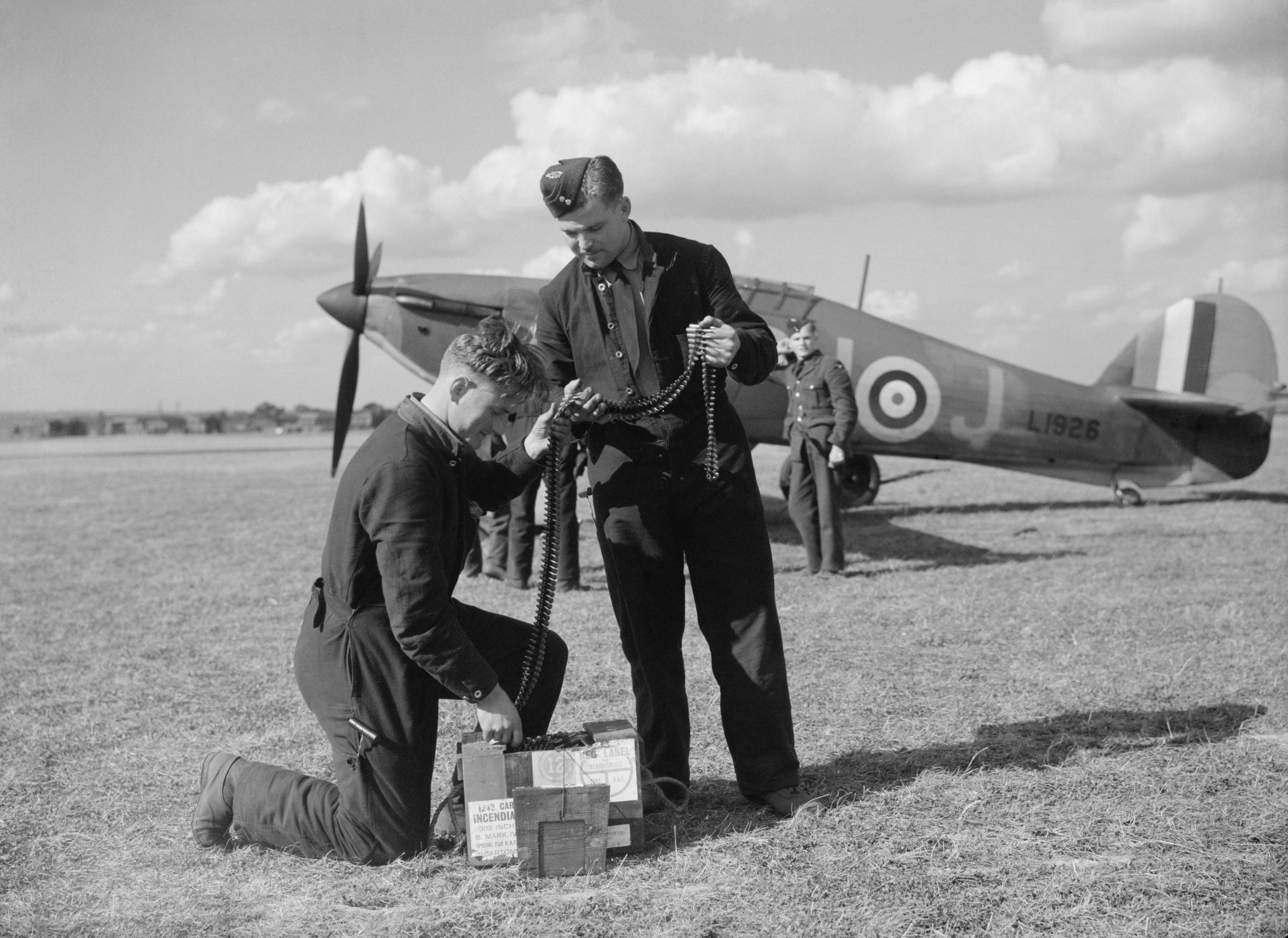
Armourers preparing belts of .303-inch ammunition for Hawker Hurricane Mk I DU-J

No. 312 Squadron RAF was a Czechoslovak-manned fighter squadron of the Royal Air Force in the Second World War.

== History ==
The squadron was formed at Duxford on 29 August 1940. It was crewed mostly by escaped Czechoslovak pilots, but its first commander was the British Squadron Leader Frank Tyson. On 12 September a Slovak fighter pilot, Ján Ambruš, was appointed as joint commander of the squadron. The plan was for responsibility to be transferred gradually from Tyson to Ambruš.

Initially the squadron was equipped with Hawker Hurricane Mk I fighters. On 26 September the squadron moved to RAF Speke to join the air defence of Merseyside. Its first victory was on 8 October 1940, when its Yellow Flight (Denys Gillam, Alois Vašátko and Josef Stehlík) shot down a Junkers Ju 88 medium bomber over Liverpool.

On 13 October Ambruš led a flight of three Hurricane Mk I fighters on patrol. Over the Irish Sea Ambruš mistakenly led the flight to attack two Bristol Blenheim Mk IF light bombers of No. 29 Squadron RAF. One Blenheim, L6637, code letters RO-S, crashed into the sea off Point of Ayre on the Isle of Man and not far from the Morecambe Bay light ship. All three of its crew were killed. The other Blenheim, L7135, code letters RO-S, survived with minor damage and returned safely to RAF Ternhill in Shropshire with its crew unharmed. Ambruš was relieved of his command, and on 12 December Sqn Ldr Evžen Čižek was appointed to succeed him. On 17 December Ambruš was transferred to the Inspectorate-General of the Czechoslovak Air Force in London.

On 3 March 1941 the squadron moved to RAF Valley on Anglesey and began flying convoy patrols over the Irish Sea. On 24 April the squadron moved to RAF Jurby, Isle of Man. In May 1941 the squadron was re-equipped with the Hurricane Mk II. On 27 May Sqn Ldr Jan Klán succeeded Čižek as commanding officer, and two days later the squadron moved to RAF Kenley in Surrey. Klán's tenure was brief, as he was replaced on 5 June with Sqn Ldr Alois Vašátko. On 20 July the squadron moved to RAF Martlesham Heath in Suffolk. On 19 August it moved again to RAF Heathfield in Ayrshire, Scotland.

The squadron was re-equipped with the Supermarine Spitfire Mk IIA in October 1941 and again with the Spitfire Mk VB/C in December. The squadron spent the first part of 1942 in Wales. It moved to RAF Fairwood Common in Glamorgan on 1 January, then to RAF Angle in Pembrokeshire on 20 February, and then returned to Fairwood Common on 10 April. The squadron's duties included coastal patrols and shipping reconnaissance flights.

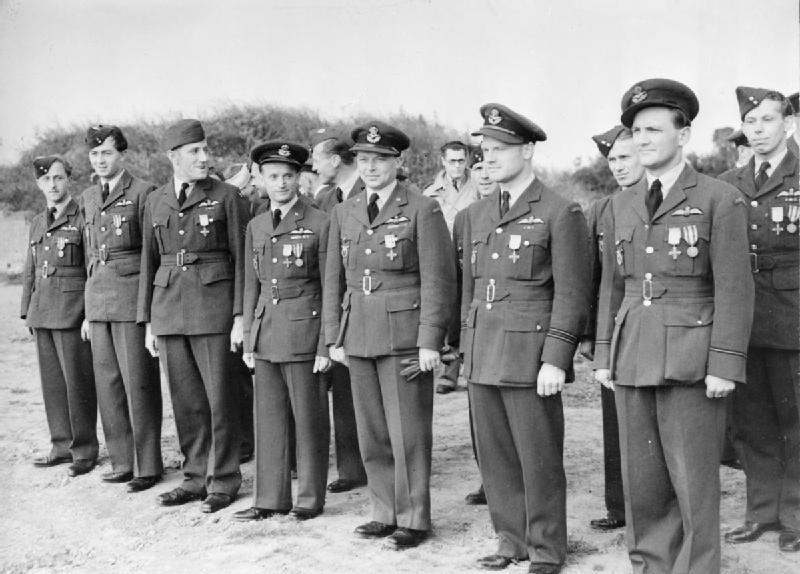
312 Squadron pilots at RAF Harrowbeer in Devon in 1942 just after being decorated by Czechoslovak President Edvard Beneš

On 23 June 1942 Sqn Ldr Vašátko was killed in action and Sqn Ldr Jan Čermák was appointed to succeed him. On 3 July 1942 the squadron moved to RAF Harrowbeer in Devon. On 19 August the squadron provided air cover for the Operation Jubilee raid on Dieppe. During the raid Miroslav Liškutín shot down a Dornier Do 217 bomber and 312 Squadron lost one of its own aircraft.

On 10 October 1942 the squadron moved to RAF Church Stanton in Somerset. On 1 January 1943 Sqn Ldr Tomáš Vybíral succeeded Čermák as squadron commander. On 24 June the squadron moved to RAF Skaebrae on Orkney. On 7 September the squadron moved to RAF Ibsley in Hampshire and joined the 2nd Tactical Air Force as a fighter-bomber unit. The squadron operated over France softening up targets in preparation for the invasion and then supporting the landings. On 1 November Sqn Ldr František Vancl succeeded Vybíral as squadron commander.

In January 1944 the squadron was re-equipped with the Spitfire Mk IX. From 20 February it spent a few days at RAF Mendlesham in Suffolk, before moving on 23 February to RAF Rochford in Essex.

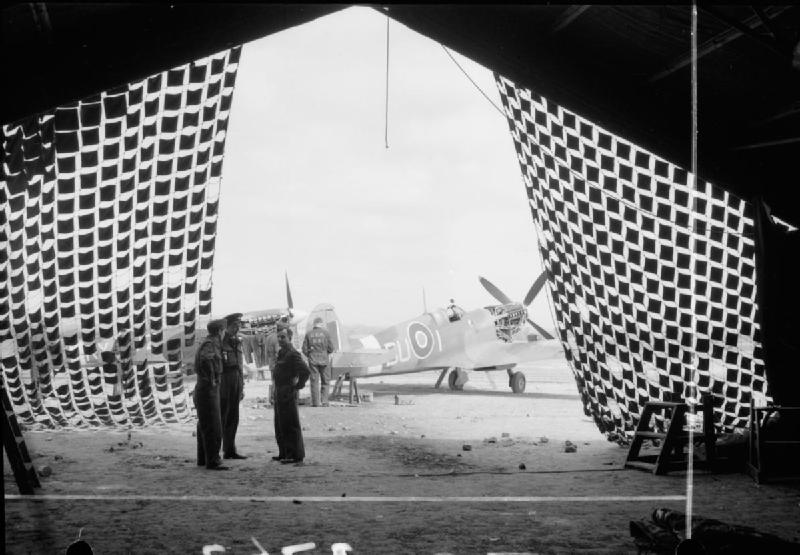
Mk IXB Spitfires of 312 Squadron at RAF Appledram being repaired outside a camouflaged Butler combat hangar

On 3 April 1944 the squadron moved to RAF Appledram in West Sussex. From here its operations included intercepting V-1 flying bombs, escorting bombers and attacking rail and road targets in German-occupied Europe. On 15 May Sqn Ldr Jaroslav Hlad'o succeeded Vancl as squadron commander. On 22 June the squadron moved to nearby RAF Tangmere, also in West Sussex.

From 4 July 1944 the squadron spent a week at RAF Lympne in Kent. On 11 July it moved again to RAF Coltishall in Norfolk and operated daytime bomber escort flights over continental Europe. However, on 27 August its duties were switched to the Air Defence of Great Britain (ADGB), for which it was moved on RAF North Weald in Essex. On 3 October it moved again to RAF Bradwell Bay, also in Essex.

On 15 November 1944 Sqn Ldr Václav Šlouf succeeded Hlad'o as squadron commander. From 27 February to 8 June 1945 the squadron was based at RAF Manston in Kent.

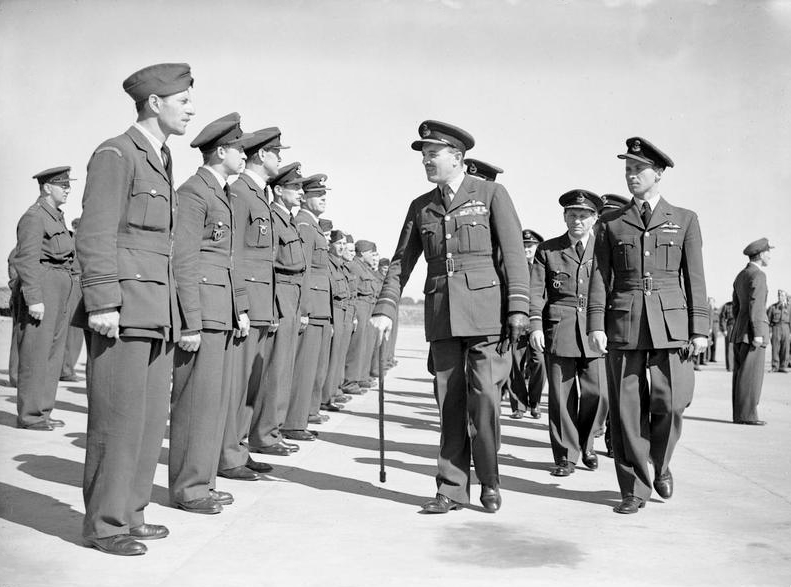
Farewell parade of Czechoslovak squadrons at RAF Manston, Kent, on 3 August 1945. Air Marshal John Slessor, with walking stick, inspects some of the men. Air Marshal Karel Janoušek can be seen behind him.

On 3 August members of all of the RAF's Czechoslovak squadrons held a farewell parade at RAF Manston. Air Marshal John Slessor inspected the parade, accompanied by Air Marshal Karel Janoušek. On 24 August 312 squadron moved to Ruzyně Airport in Prague. It became a squadron of the new Czechoslovak Air Force, and on 15 February 1946 was officially disbanded as an RAF squadron.

Seven Spitfire F Mk IXs survive today that flew with the squadron in 1944–45. This is by far the largest number of surviving aircraft associated with a single squadron.

== Notable members ==
- Ján Ambruš
- Miroslav Liškutín
- František Peřina
- Otto Smik
- Miroslav Štandera
- Josef Stehlík
- Karel Bergman
- Emil Boček (last surviving member of the squadron)

== Aircraft operated ==
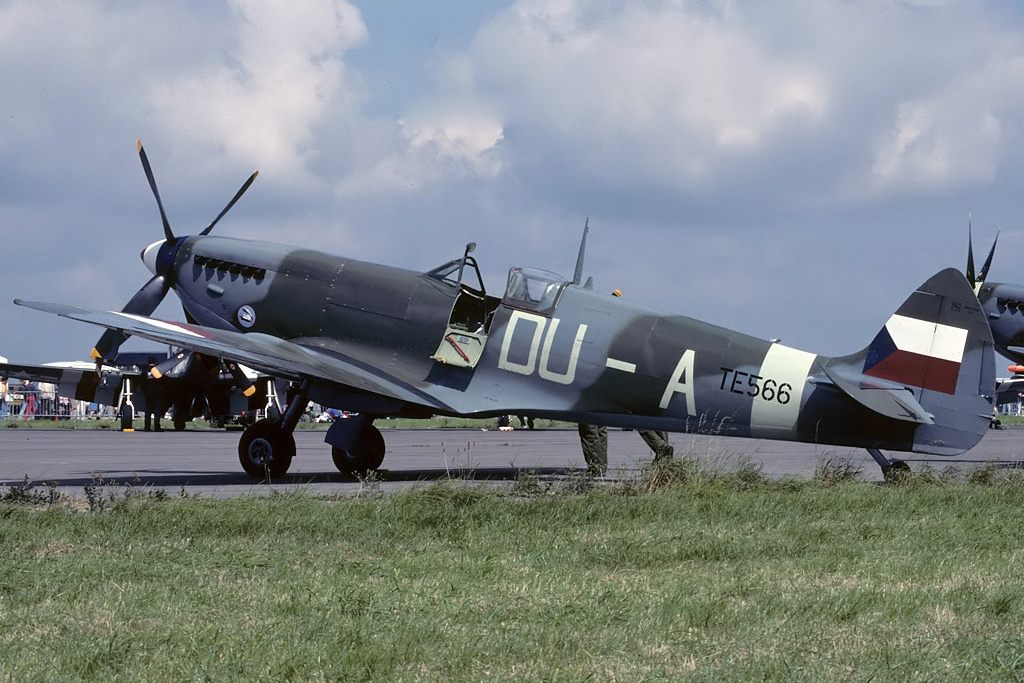
A Spitfire Mk IX that served with 312 Squadron

| From | To | Aircraft | Variant | Notes |
|---|---|---|---|---|
| August 1940; May 1941 | May 1941; December 1941 | Hawker Hurricane | I IIb | single-engined monoplane piston-engined fighter |
| October 1941; November 1941; December 1941; August 1942; September 1943; January 1944; June 1944 | December 1941; January 1942; February 1944; June 1943; February 1944; June 1944; February 1946 | Supermarine Spitfire | IIa; IIb; Vb; Vc; Vc; LF.IXb; HF.IX | single-engine monoplane piston-engined fighter |

Aircraft of this squadron used a unit code letters DU.

=== Loch Doon Spitfire ===
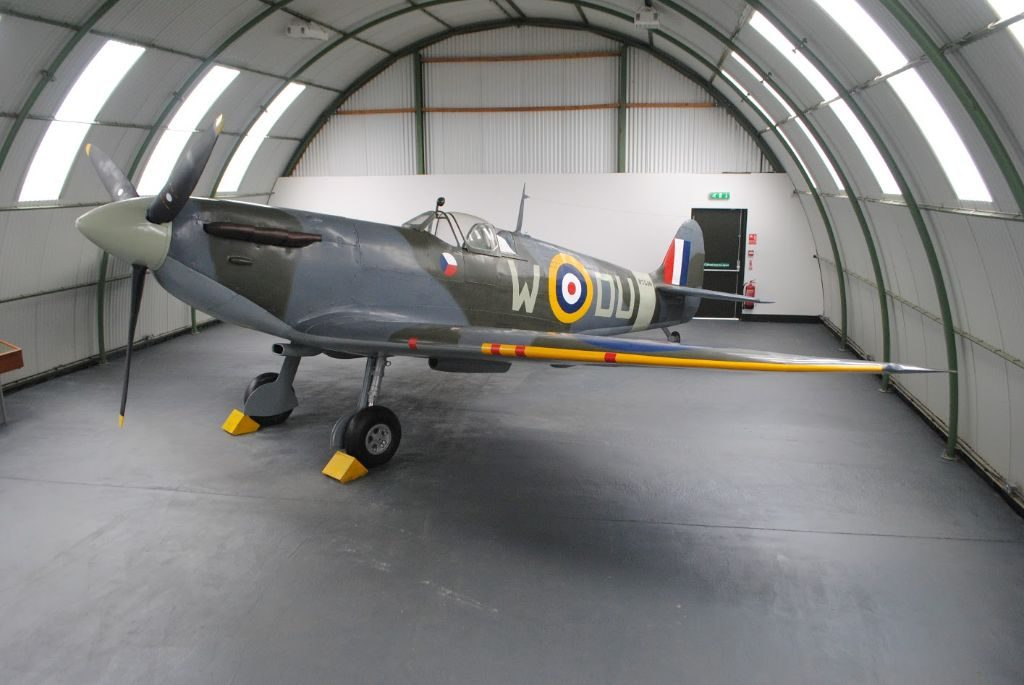
Spitfire Mk IIA P7540, DU-W, at Dumfries and Galloway Aviation Museum

On 25 October 1941, when 312 Squadron was based at RAF Heathfield, F/O František Hekl crashed a Spitfire Mk IIA into a reservoir in Ayrshire on a solo training flight. The Spitfire was serial number P7540, carrying the marking DU-W.

An eyewitness the Spitfire flying low over the surface of Loch Doon when Hekl banked the aircraft to starboard and its starboard wingtip caught the water surface. Hekl lost control and the aircraft broke up and sank, leaving only a patch of oil on the water. An RAF salvage crew brought a boat and spent several days trawling parts of the bed of the loch, but failed to find either the aircraft or Hekl's body.

In 1977 the Dumfries branch of the Scottish Sub Aqua Club began a systematic search of the bed of the loch in the area where an eyewitness thought the aircraft had crashed. In 1979 several clubs from the Northern Federation of British Sub-Aqua Clubs joined the search, and Blackpool Sub-Aqua Club took over organisation of the project.

The search was unsuccessful so in 1982 it was moved to a different area of the loch, where divers quickly found the Spitfire's tail and rear part of the fuselage. In subsequent dives other parts of the aircraft were found, scattered over a distance of 200 metres. Both wings were badly damaged, magnesium parts such as the undercarriage wheels had corroded away, but the Merlin Mk XII engine was recovered in good condition. Hekl's body was not found.

The wreckage was moved to Dumfries and Galloway Aviation Museum, where the aircraft was slowly restored and a pair of replica wings fitted. Restoration to non-flying condition was completed in 2017.

== Surviving Aircraft ==
- Supermarine Spitfire F Mk.IIA P7540. On display at the Dumfries and Galloway Aviation Museum at the former RAF Dumfries airfield. This aircraft was built at Castle Bromwich on 20 October 1940 and was first issued to 66 Squadron at Gravesend. Whilst being flown by Flying Officer Bobby Oxspring DFC** AFC, it was credited with shooting down a Messerschmitt Bf 109 during the Battle of Britain. On 25 October 1941, whilst being flown by Flying Officer Frantisek Hekl, 312 (Czech) Sqn from RAF Ayr, it crashed into Loch Doon. It was finally recovered from Loch Doon in 1982 and restored to static condition and finally revealed to the public in 2017.

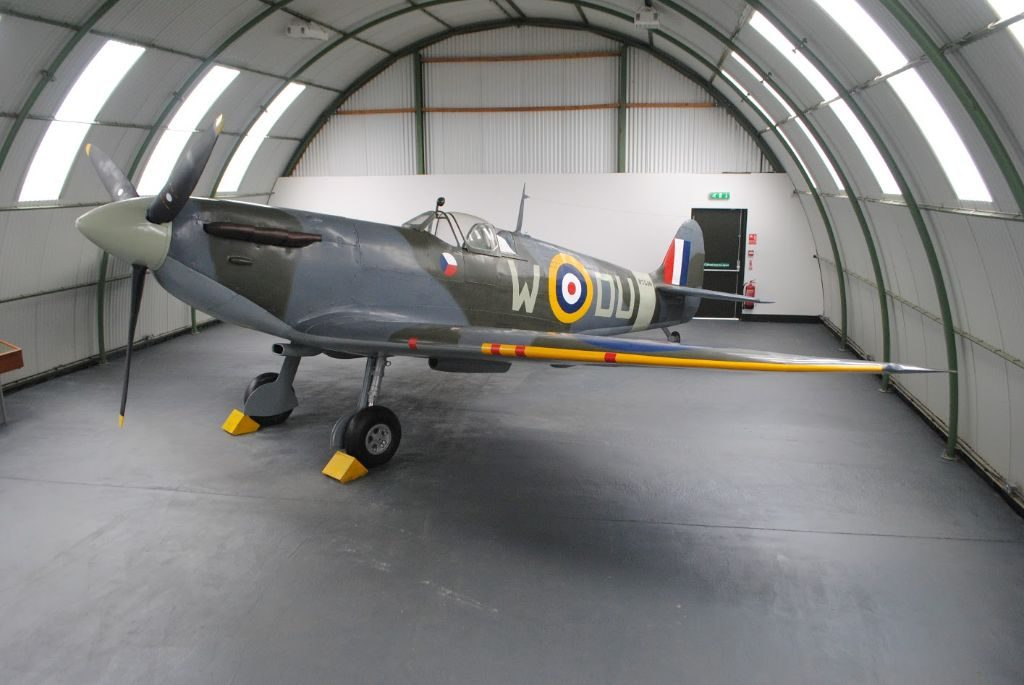
Spitfire Mk IIA P7540, DU-W, at Dumfries and Galloway Aviation Museum

- Supermarine Spitfire F Mk. Vc AR501 (civil registration G-AWII) built in 1942, remains airworthy, and is maintained & operated by The Shuttleworth Collection in Bedfordshire, England. AR501 was one of a production batch of 300 Spitfires ordered under Contract No. 1305/40 of August 1940 from Westland Aircraft, Yeovil.

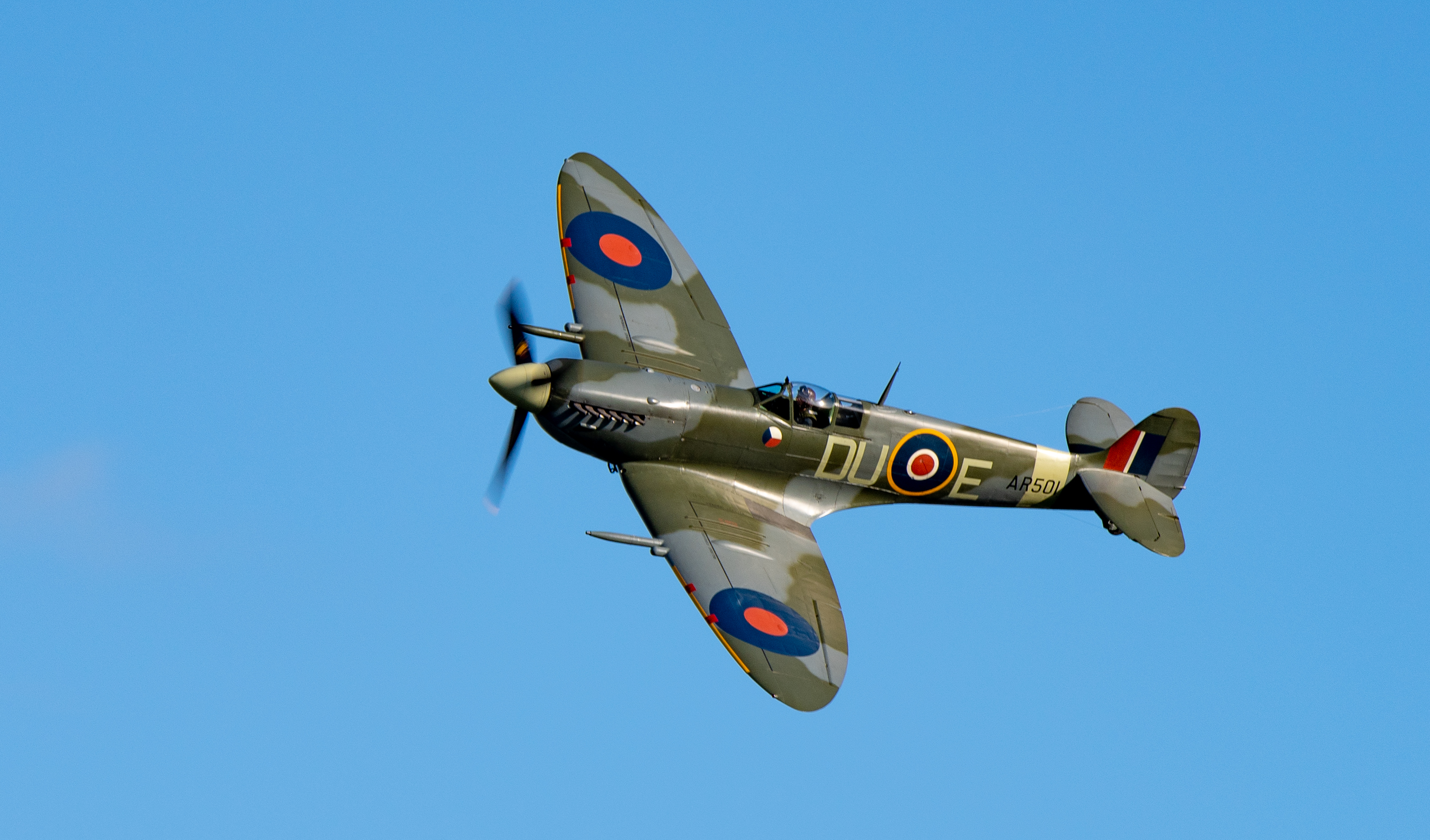
Spitfire Mk Vc 'AR501' of The Shuttleworth Collection, shown here in No. 312 (Czech) colours

Following restoration in 2018 by The Shuttleworth Collection it is presented in the squadron colours of No. 312 (Czech) Squadron, which the aircraft moved to on October 10th 1943 from No. 310 (Czech) Squadron. Shuttleworth periodically switch between elliptical and clipped wing configurations.
