= Defence of Kupiczów =

- Part of Polish-Ukrainian ethnic conflict
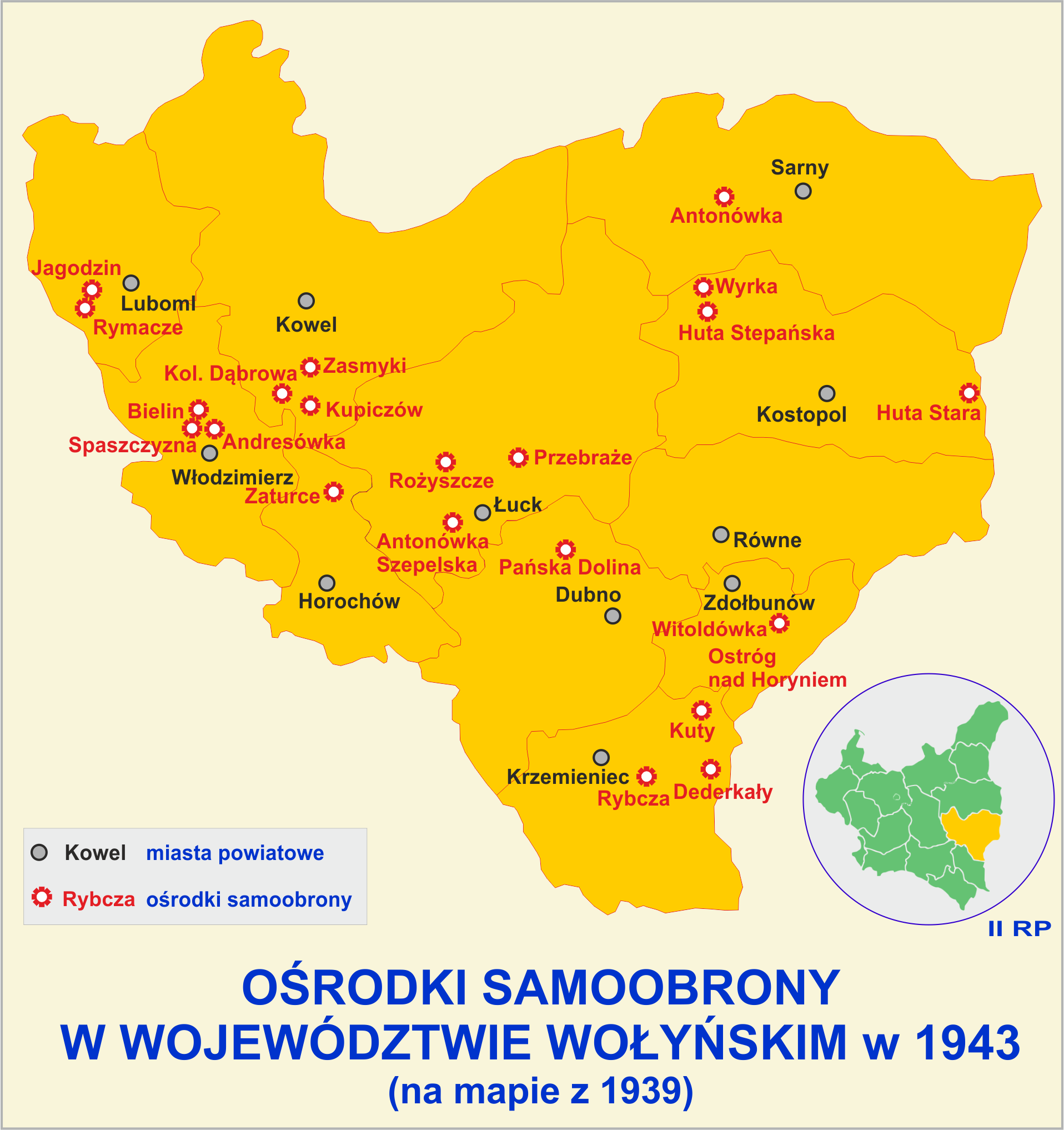
Date	November 12-22, 1943
Location	Kupiczów, Kowel County, Wołyń Voivodeship
Result	Polish-Czech victory
Territorial changes	Polish-Czech Forces managed to gain control over Kupiczów

Belligerents
Home Army; Czech Self-Defence	Ukrainian Insurgent Army

Commanders and leaders
Władysław Czermiński; Major Szatyński-Szatowski	Porfyr Frolovych Antoniyuk †

Units involved
"Jastrzębia" Unit; Czech Self-Defence	Pohrebniak sotnia

Strength
First Battle: Unknown; Second Battle: 40 soldiers	First Battle: Unknown; Second Battle: Over 1,000 men

Casualties and losses
First Battle: 3 injured Second Battle: Unknown	First Battle: 27 killed Second Battle: Unknown

The Defence of Kupiczów (Polish: Obrona Kupiczowa; Ukrainian: Оборона Купічова) was a fought defence between the Polish Home Army unit "Jastrzębia" who aided the Czech Self-Defence against the Ukrainian Insurgent Army in the Kowel County of the Wołyń Voivodeship. There were 2 battles fought during the entire defence in Kupiczow and both remained in Polish-Czech victories.

== Background ==
After the withdrawal of the German-Lithuanian garrison from Kupiczów (following food requisitions), fears arose among the local Czech population of an impending UPA takeover amid the ongoing ethnic violence targeting Poles and perceived collaborators. The Czech underground organization "Aktyw" sent emissaries to the nearby Polish Home Army base in Zasmyki.

On 9 November 1943, an agreement was concluded with Major Jan Szatyński-Szatowski "Kowal". Under its terms, the Czechs agreed to field a platoon of fighters and provide food supplies for the Polish garrison, in exchange for joint defence against UPA attacks on equal terms with the Polish population. Both sides honored the agreement.

== Battles in Kupiczów ==
=== First Battle ===
On the night of 11–12 November 1943, UPA forces entered Kupiczów and attempted to seize control. After a brief engagement in which one Ukrainian fighter was killed, the village was recaptured by Polish AK units supported by Czech Self-Defense forces.

The "Jastrzębie" unit, commanded by Lieutenant Władysław Czermiński "Jastrzębie", arrived from Zasmyki after a night march and joined the defenders. The following day, the Ukrainians attempted to retake the village but were repelled.

Fighting continued throughout the day with varying intensity. According to Polish accounts (including those by Władysław and Ewa Siemaszko), UPA forces were reinforced by armed local peasants using farm tools (such as pitchforks and axes), providing a numerical advantage. In total, 27 Ukrainians were reported killed, including the commander of the Pohrebniak sotnia (pseudonym "Kurshun" or "Korsun"). The defenders suffered three injuries.

After the engagement, the "Jastrzębie" unit returned to Zasmyki, leaving a 40-man AK outpost in Kupiczów. Doubts emerged in the Polish command regarding the sustainability of the position due to force dispersal, but Major Szatyński-Szatowski opposed withdrawal.

=== Second Battle ===
On 22 November 1943, UPA units launched a large-scale assault on Kupiczów, deploying over 1,000 fighters, two light cannons, and an improvised armored vehicle (a captured Soviet tractor mounted with a cannon, described in Polish sources as a "tank"). The village was attacked simultaneously from multiple directions.

The defenders (including local Czech and Polish residents) faced severe ammunition shortages as the siege intensified. Residents worked to extinguish fires started by artillery shells, while Czech civilians prepared to defend using farm tools (flails, pitchforks, axes) and improvised weapons.

Reinforcements from the "Jastrzębie" unit and elements of Michał Fijałka "Sokół"'s forces arrived from Zasmyki. A counterattack launched from outside the encirclement in several directions forced the UPA to withdraw. The improvised "tank" broke down during the battle and was captured by the defenders, who displayed it as a trophy in the village center.

During the fighting, a significant portion of the Ukrainian-inhabited section of Kupiczów (the street leading northeast from the center) was burned down.

== Aftermath ==
The successful defences incorporated Kupiczów into the Zasmyki self-defense network, one of the most robust Polish Home Army strongholds in Volhynia. Polish-Czech cooperation continued, strengthening local protection until the arrival of Soviet forces on 14 April 1944. The village later hosted a partisan hospital and grew to around 100 Polish-Czech defenders.

The Defence of Kupiczów is documented in Polish historical sources as notable examples of joint ethnic resistance during the intense Polish-Ukrainian conflict in the region.

== Bibliography ==
- Turowski, Józef (1990). walki 27 Wołyńskiej Dywizji AK (in Polish). State Publisher. Nauk. ISBN 8301084650.
- Siemaszko, Władysław; Siemaszko, Ewa (2000). Ludobójstwo dokonane przez nacjonalistów ukraińskich na ludności polskiej Wołynia 1939–1945 [Genocide committed by Ukrainian nationalists on the Polish population of Volhynia] (in Polish). Warsaw: Von Borowiecky. ISBN 83-87689-34-3.
