= Czech Republic–Ukraine relations =

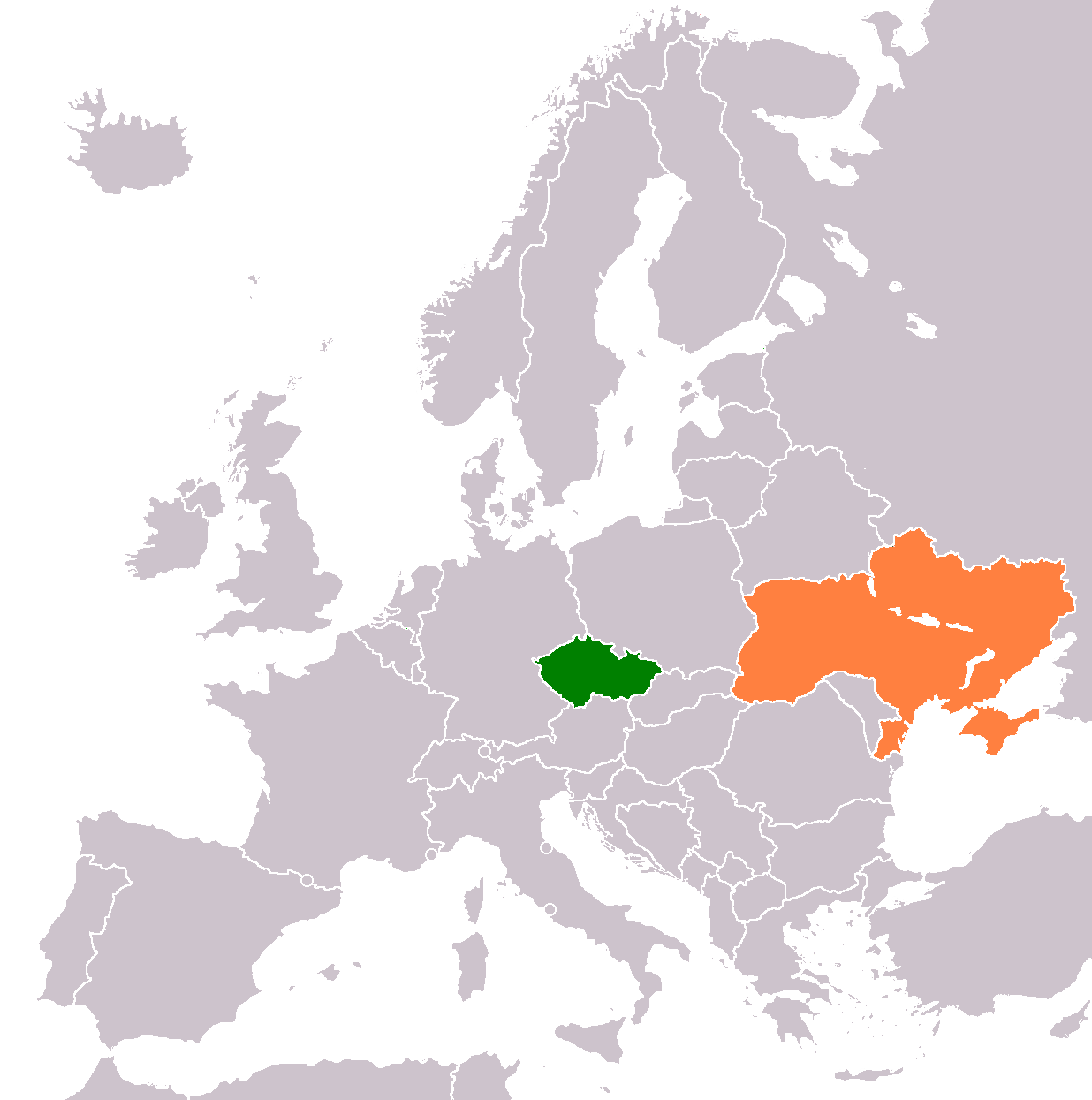
- Czech Republic: Ukraine

Czech Republic–Ukraine relations are the foreign relations between the Czech Republic and Ukraine. Both countries established current diplomatic relations on 18 February, 1992. The Czech Republic has an embassy in Kyiv and Ukraine has an embassy in Prague. The Czech Republic is a member of the European Union and NATO, which Ukraine applied for in 2022.

== History ==
Czechoslovak newspaper Svoboda, co-founded by Jaroslav Hašek, was issued in Kyiv in 1917 and Taganrog, temporary capital of the Ukrainian Soviet Republic, in 1918.

During the interwar era, the current Ukrainian Zakarpattia Oblast was part of Czechoslovakia, before being ceded to Hungary in 1938. It was eventually annexed by the Soviet Union and included within the Ukrainian SSR following World War II.

In December 2025, the Czech prime minister said in an interview that the Czech Republic will not guarantee loans or provide direct financing to Ukraine, calling on the European Commission to find alternative solutions at the EU level.

== Czechs in Ukraine ==
Czechs migrated to the territory of modern-day Ukraine in the 19th century. Following the Ukrainian independence of 1991, over 1,800 Czechs left Ukraine for the Czech Republic by 1993.

== Ukrainians in the Czech Republic ==
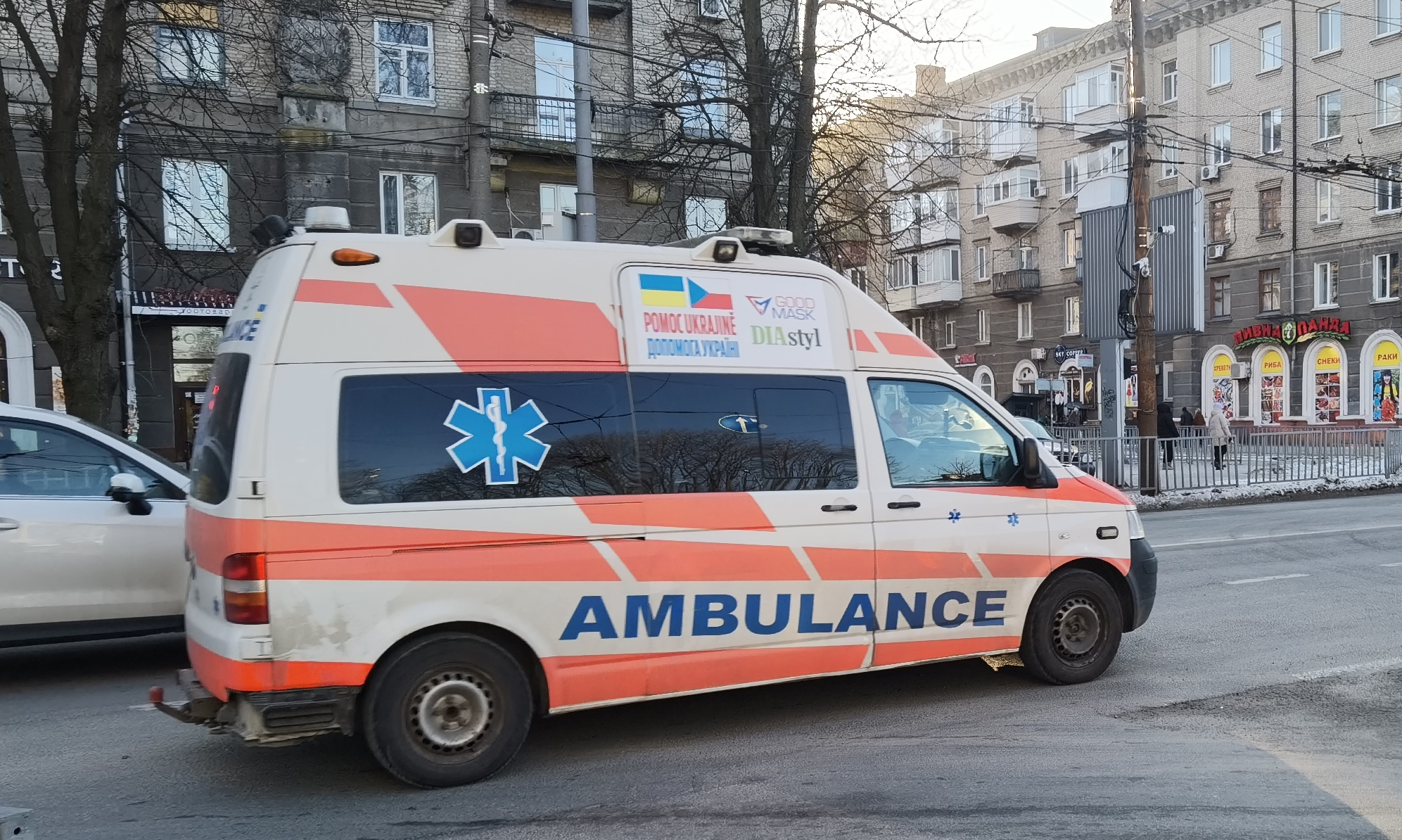
Ambulance in Dnipro Ukraine, during war with sign in czech and ukrainian: Help for Ukraine.

Immigration to the Czech Republic from Ukraine, primarily for economic reasons, began to grow significantly in the early 1990s following the end of the Cold War. In 1991, 8,500 Ukrainian citizens were recorded as living on Czech territory, with that number increasing to 132,481 as of October 2018, according to the Czech Statistical Office. This made Ukrainians the largest expatriate group within the Czech Republic, comprising 30% of the country's total international population.

Following the Russian invasion of Ukraine on February 24, 2022, the number of Ukrainians within the country increased drastically as thousands fled the war. As of July 31, 2023, over 357,000 refugees from Ukraine have been given temporary protection status within the Czech Republic, making the country the third largest destination for Ukrainians in the European Union.

== Carpathian Eight ==
On 18 September 2026, Ukrainian President Volodymyr Zelenskyy announced the creation of the Carpathian Eight, a regional cooperation format involving Austria, the Czech Republic, Hungary, Poland, Romania, Serbia, Slovakia and Ukraine. The initiative was presented as a framework for cooperation in trade, transport, energy and security.

== Resident diplomatic missions ==
- the Czech Republic has an embassy in Kyiv.
- Ukraine has an embassy in Prague.
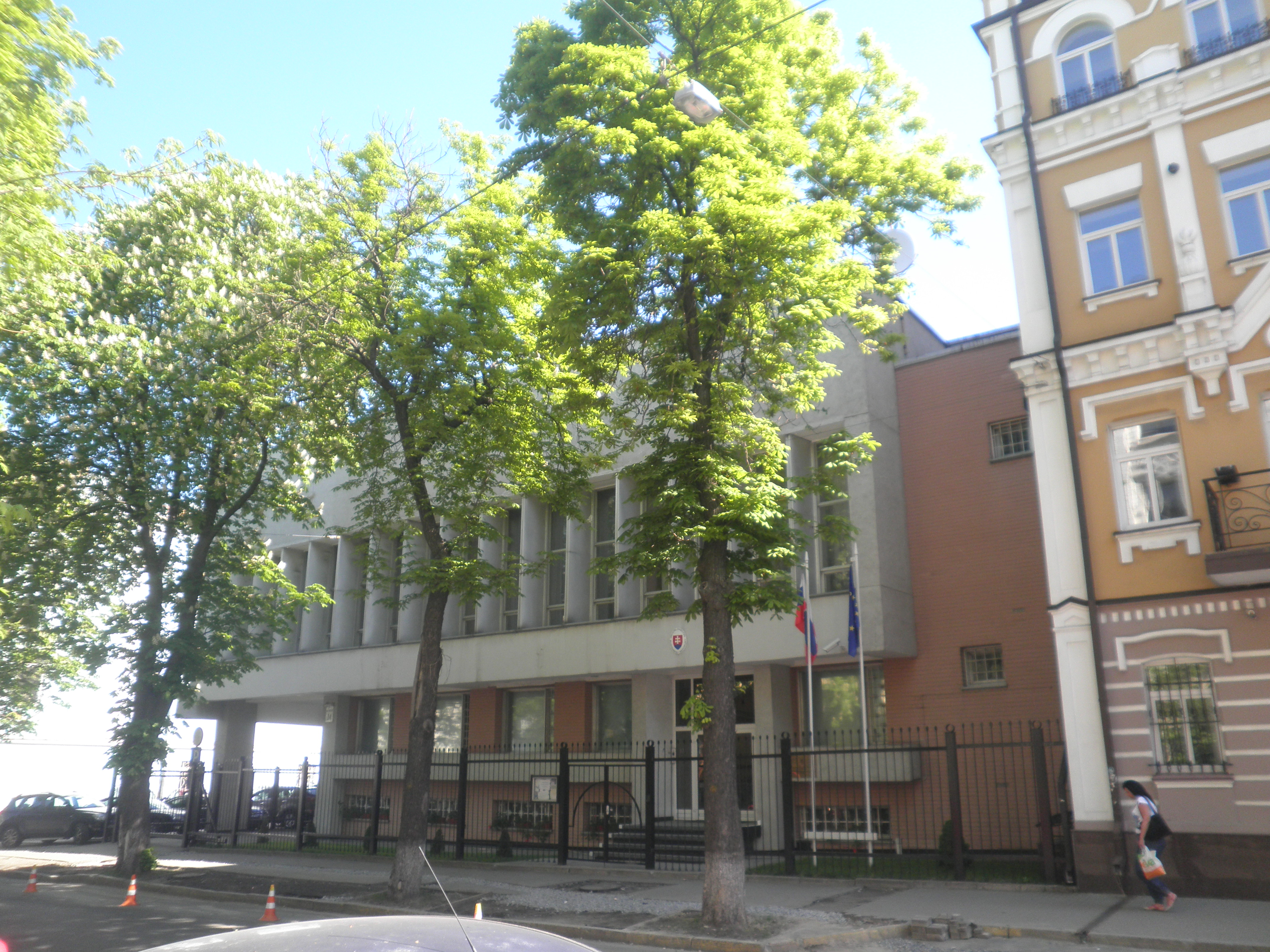
Embassy of the Czech Republic in Kyiv

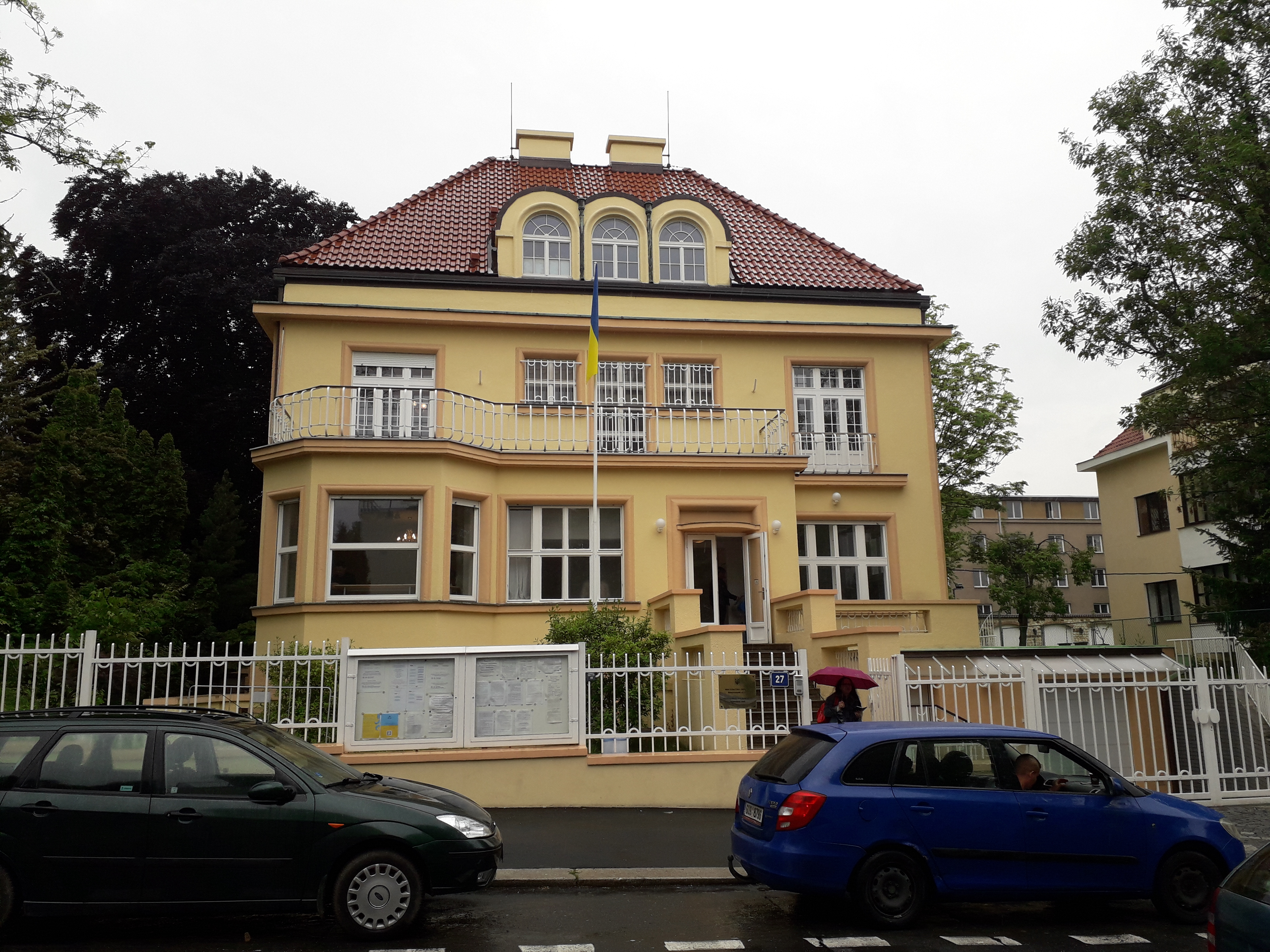
Embassy of Ukraine in Prague

== See also ==
- Foreign relations of the Czech Republic
- Foreign relations of Ukraine
- Czechs in Ukraine
- Ukrainians in the Czech Republic

== Sources ==
- Markus, V. (1994), "Ukrainians in the Czech and Slovak Republic", in Pawliczko, A. L. (ed.), Ukraine and Ukrainians throughout the World: The Demographic and Sociological Guide to the Homeland and Its Diaspora, Toronto: University of Toronto Press, pp. 147–159, ISBN 978-0-8020-7200-9
- Nekorjak, M. (2006), "Klientský systém a ukrajinská pracovní migrace do České republiky", Sociální studia, 3 (1): 89–109, doi:10.5817/SOC2006-1-89, ISSN 1214-813X
  - An English version was also presented as a conference paper, Čermáková, D; Nekorjak, M. (2007), "Ukrainian Middleman System of Labour Organization in the Czech Republic" (PDF), Mezinárodní migrace a nelegální pracovní aktivity migrantů v Česku v širším evropském kontextu, Tijdschrift voor Economische en Sociale Geografie, Charles University
