= Kupychiv =

Coordinates: 51°00′N 24°43′E

Kupychiv (Ukrainian: Купичів, Polish: Kupiczów, also called Kupiczów Czeski – Czech Kupychiv) is a village located in northwestern Ukraine in Volhynia. The village is in Kovel raion of Volyn Oblast, but was formerly administered within Turiisk Raion. The village has a population of 854.

== History ==
In the Second Polish Republic, Kupychiv (then Kupiczów) was part of the Kovel county, Volhynian Voivodeship. In 1939, it had around 1000 inhabitants, most of whom were Czechs, also some Poles and Jews. In the village there was a Roman-Catholic church as well as a Hussite chapel.

During the Massacres of Poles in Volhynia, Kupychiv became one of centers of Czech self-defence, which, allied with local Poles, together fought Ukrainian nationalists of the Ukrainian Insurgent Army. In the summer of 1943, the Ukrainians tried to capture the village, but failed. After 1944, when Volhynia became part of the Soviet Union, most of Czech and Polish survivors left the village.

== Gallery ==
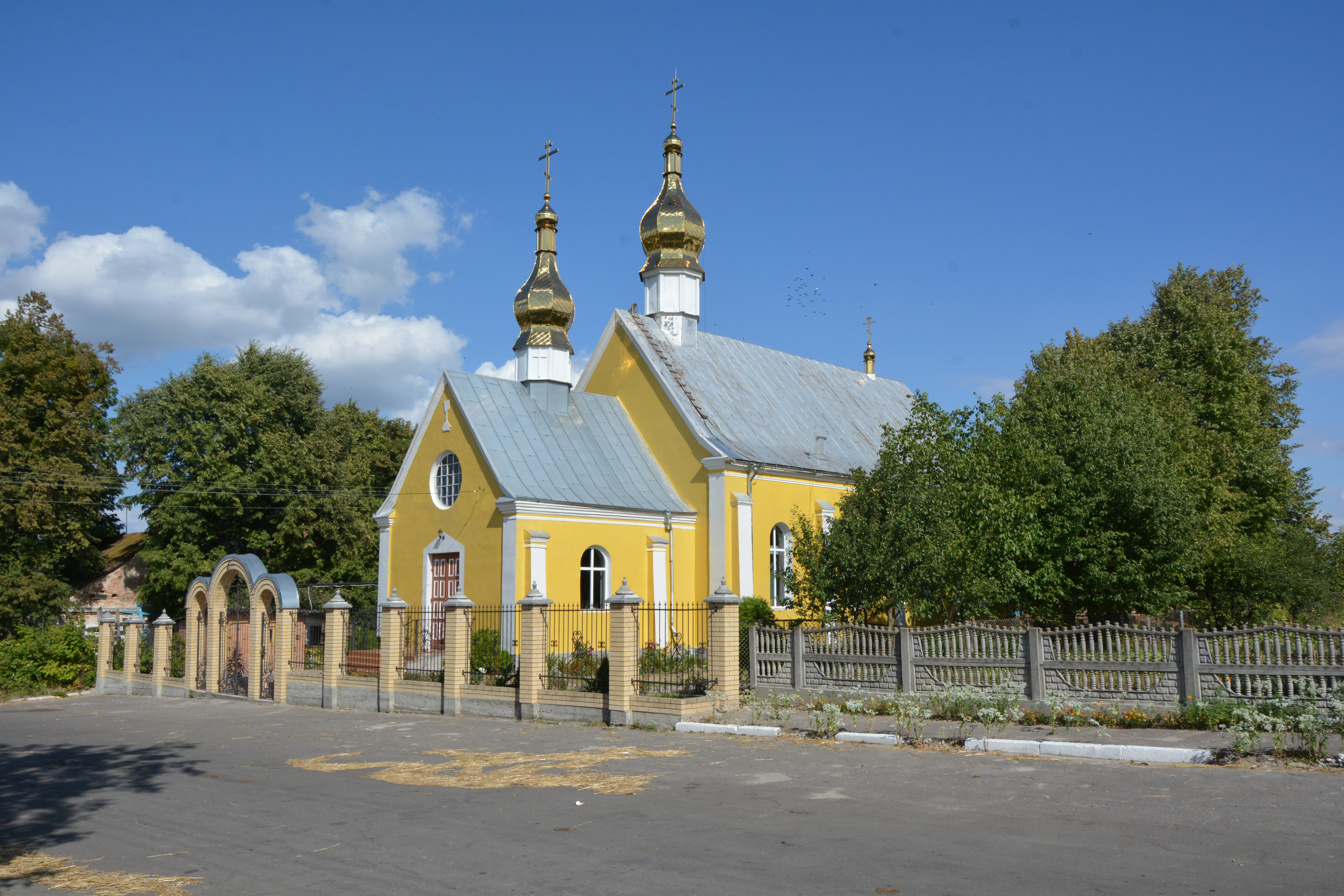
Transfiguration church in Kupychiv (1920)

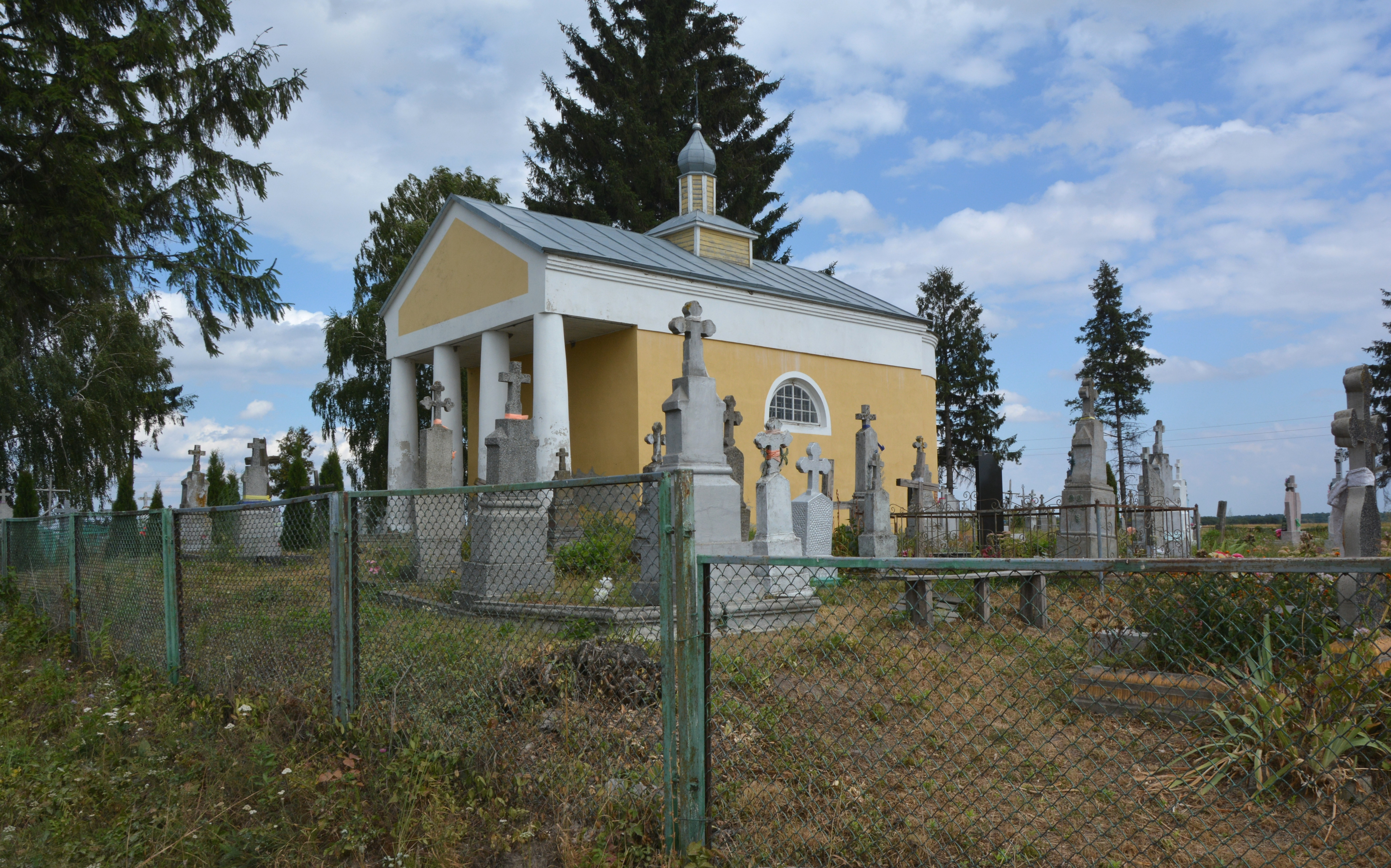
Holy Trinity church in Kupychiv (1825) - view from the street

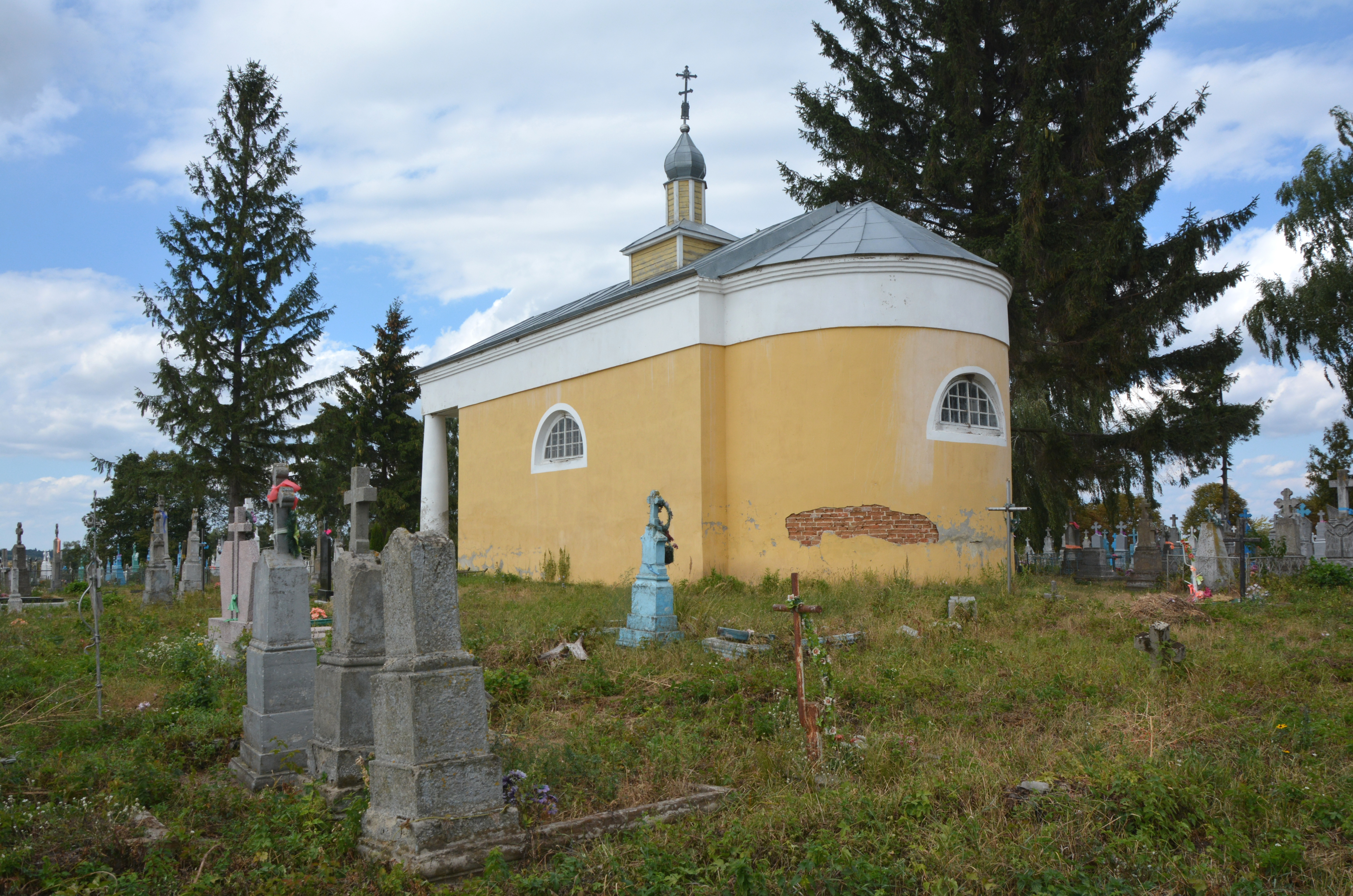
Holy Trinity church in Kupychiv - view from the cemetery

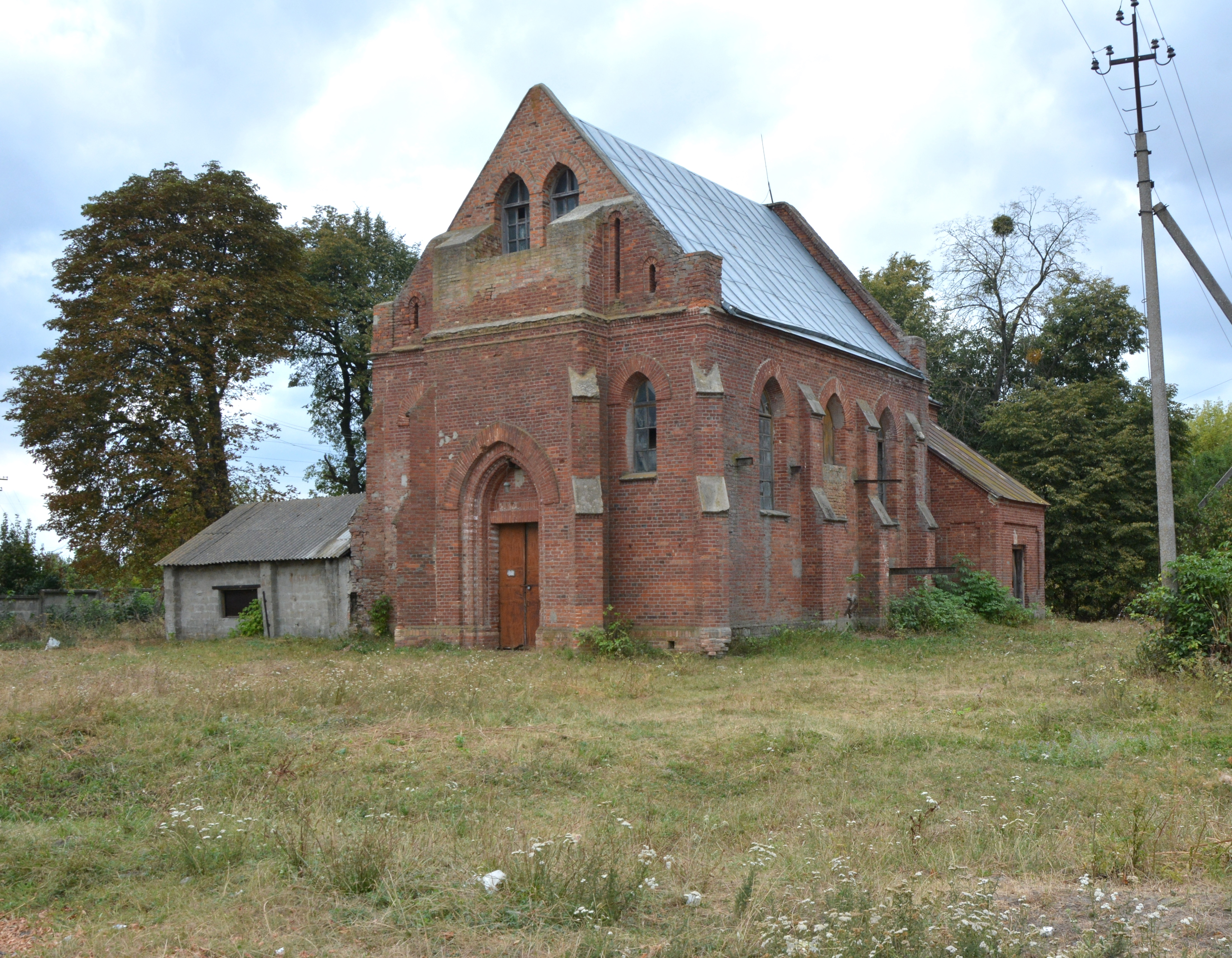
Church of Czech community in Kupychiv (1900) - front view

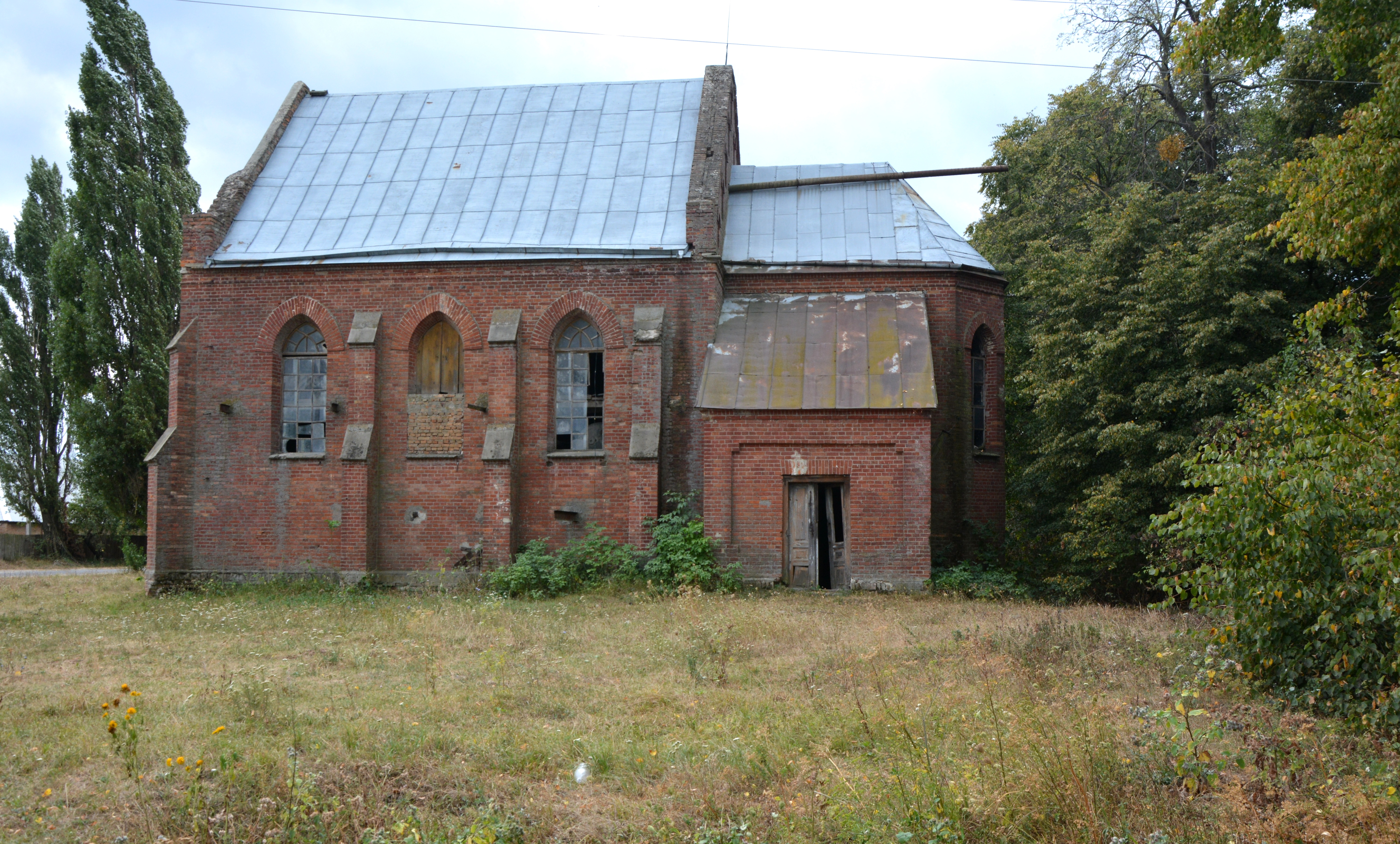
Church of Czech community in Kupychiv - side view

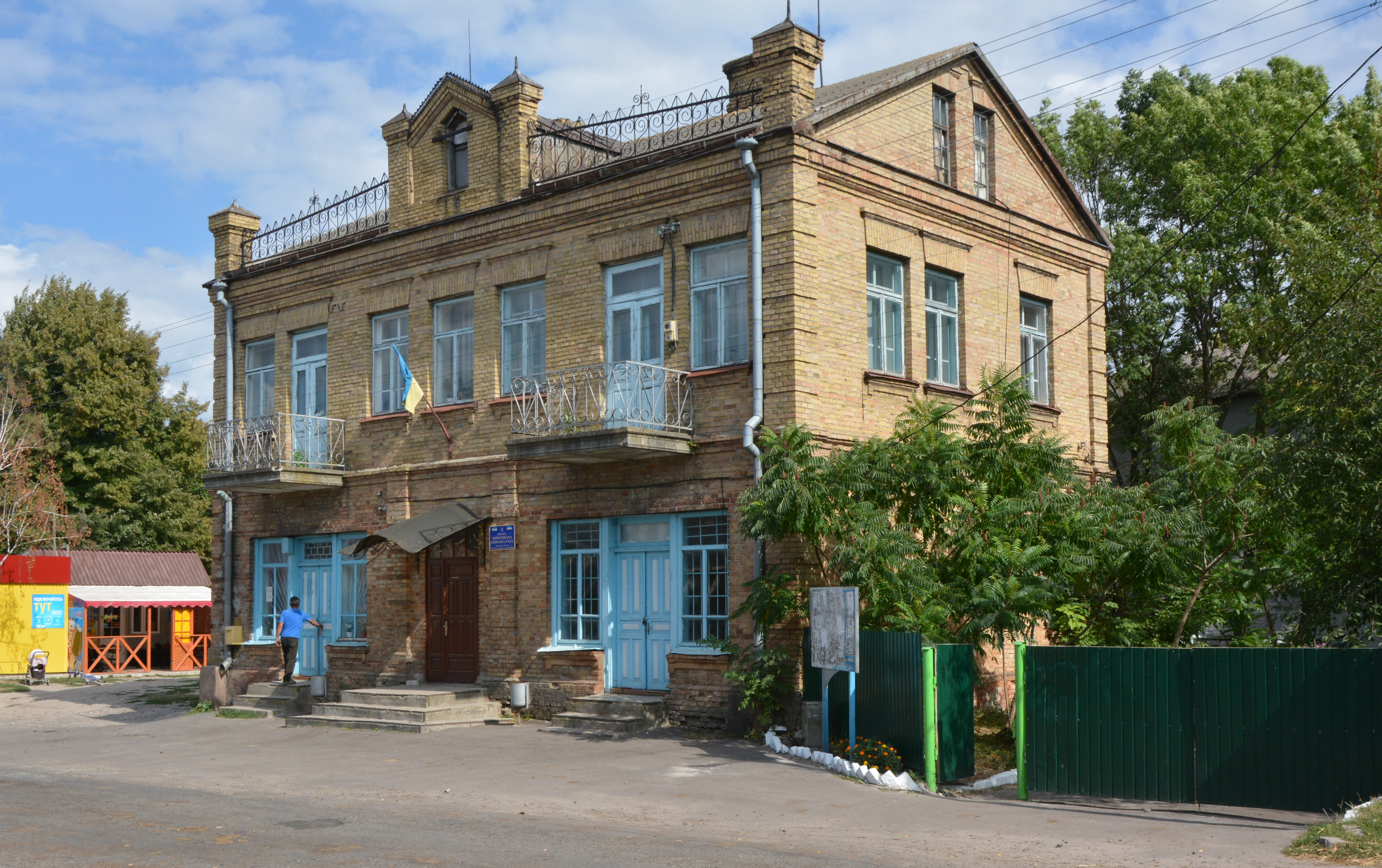
Former Manor House (XVIII-ХІХ cent.), currently- Kupychiv village council

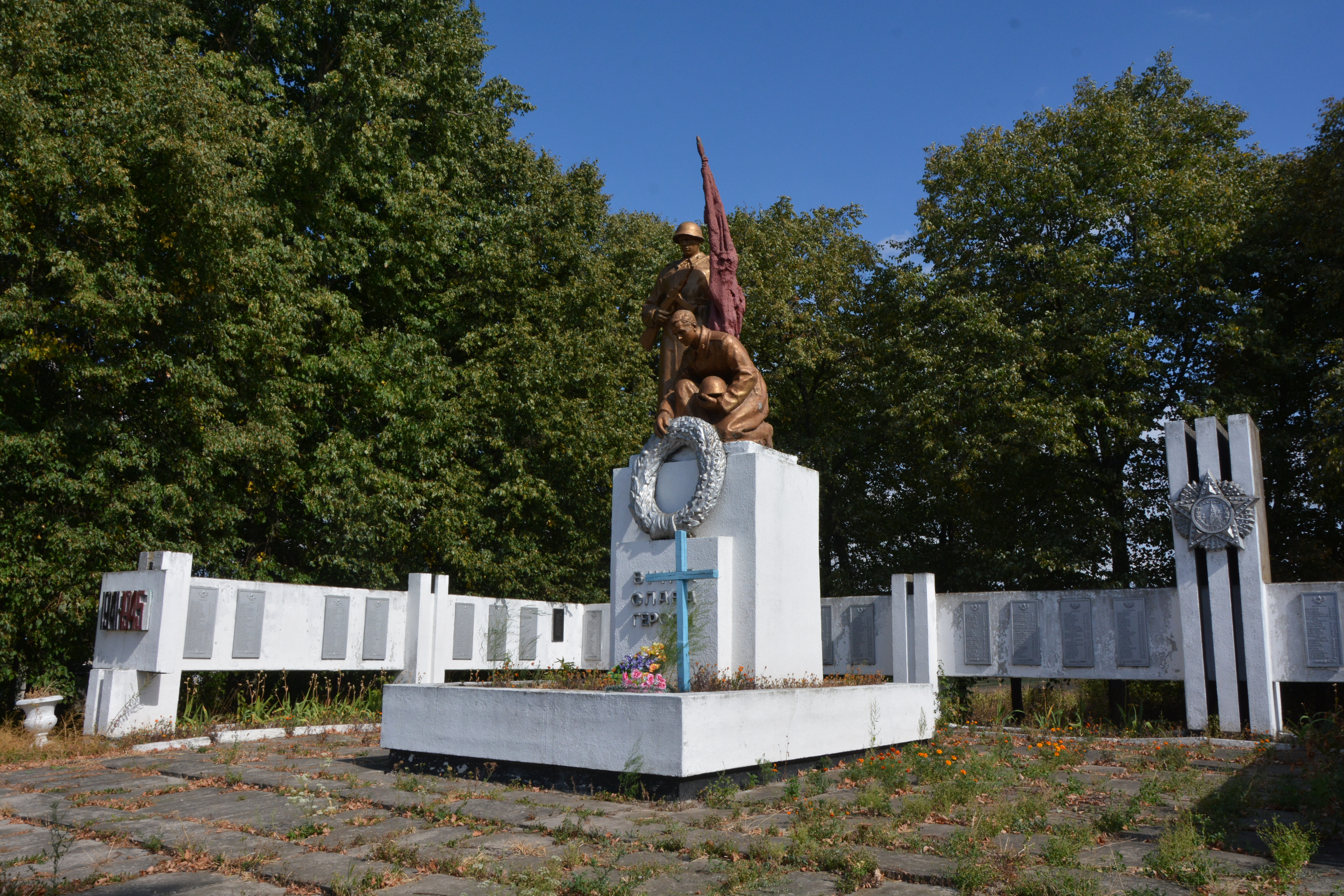
Memorial and common grave of World War II warriors

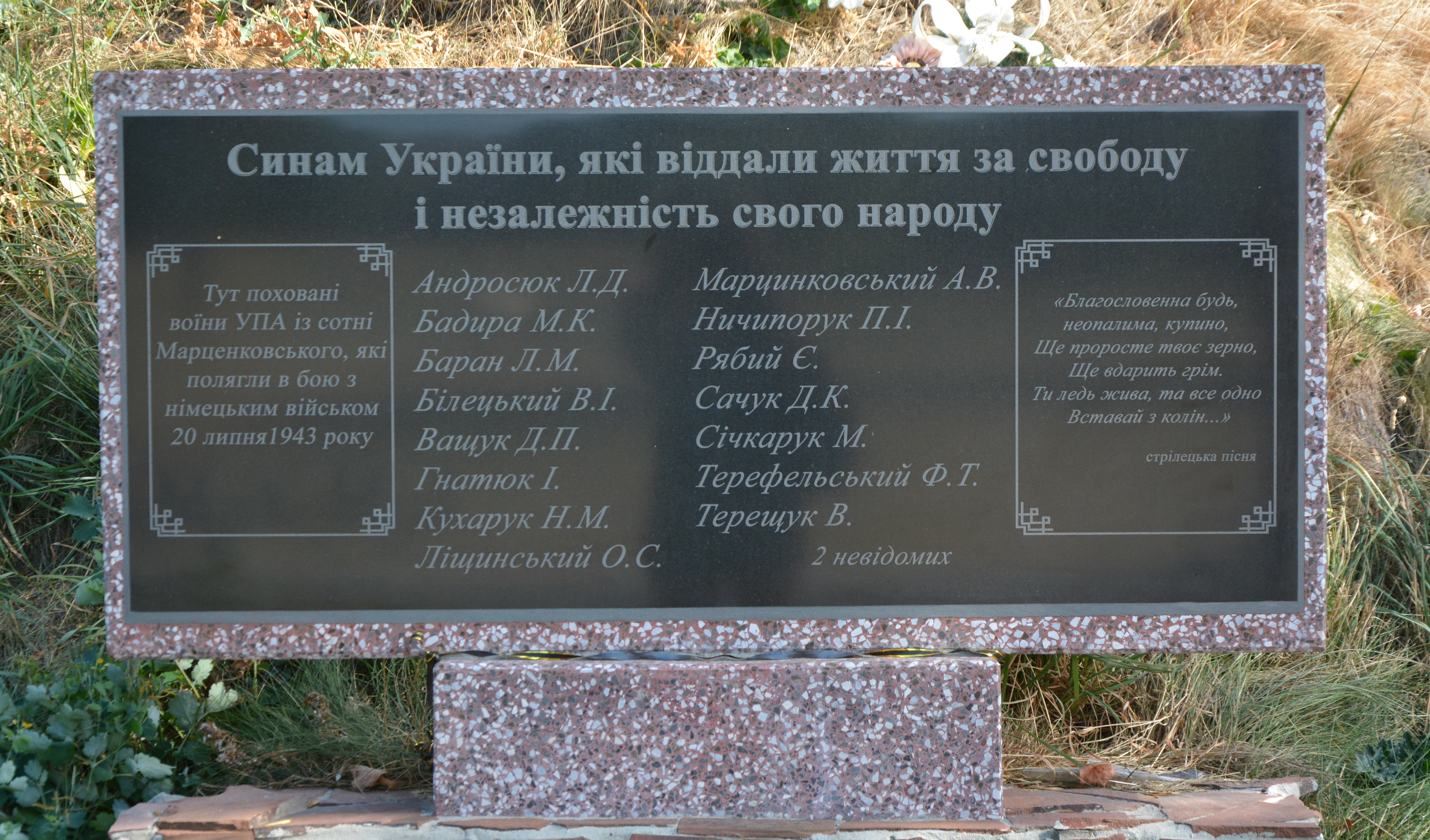
Memorial and common grave of Ukrainian Insurgent Army (UPA) warriors (1943)

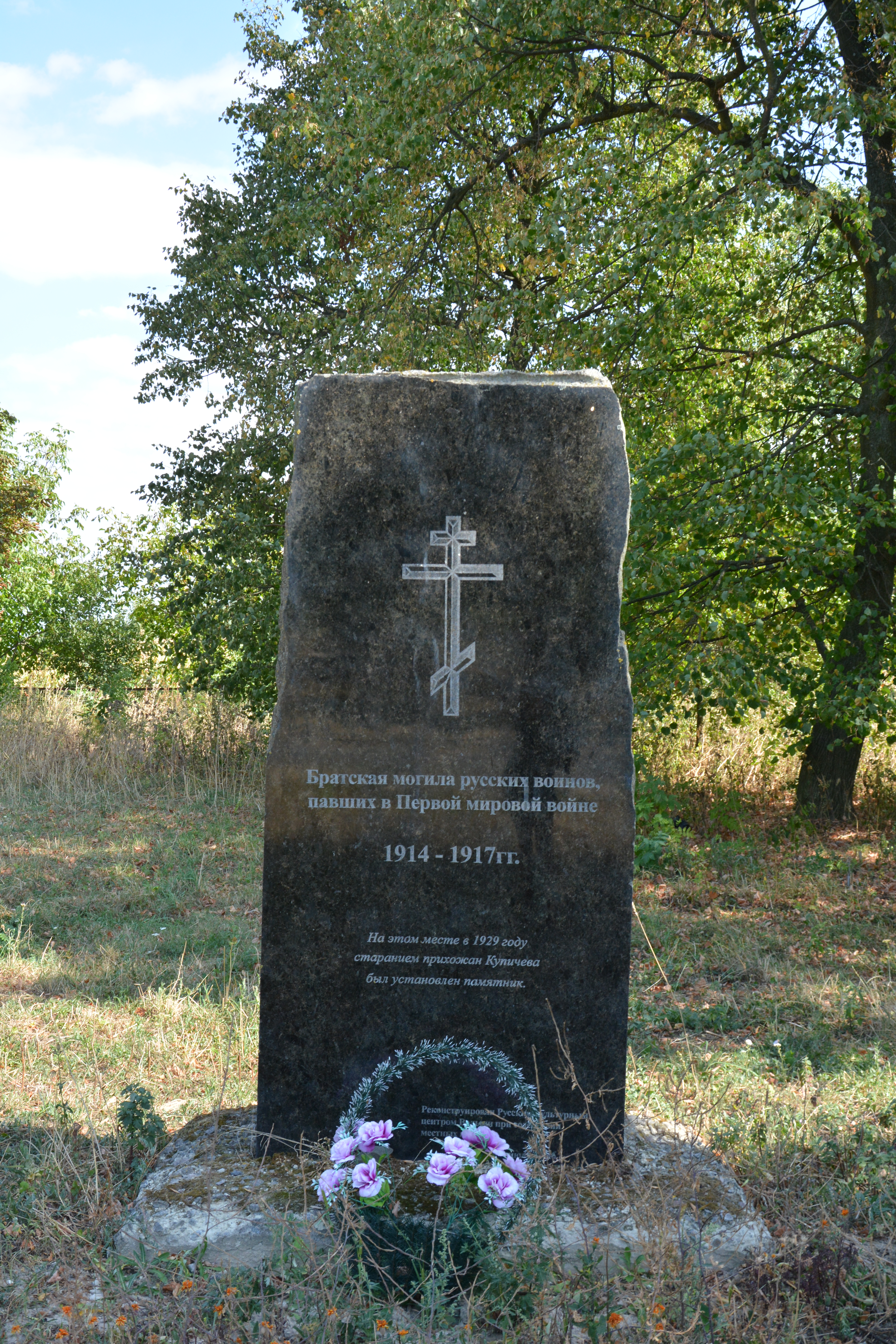
Common grave of Russian army soldiers fallen during World War I

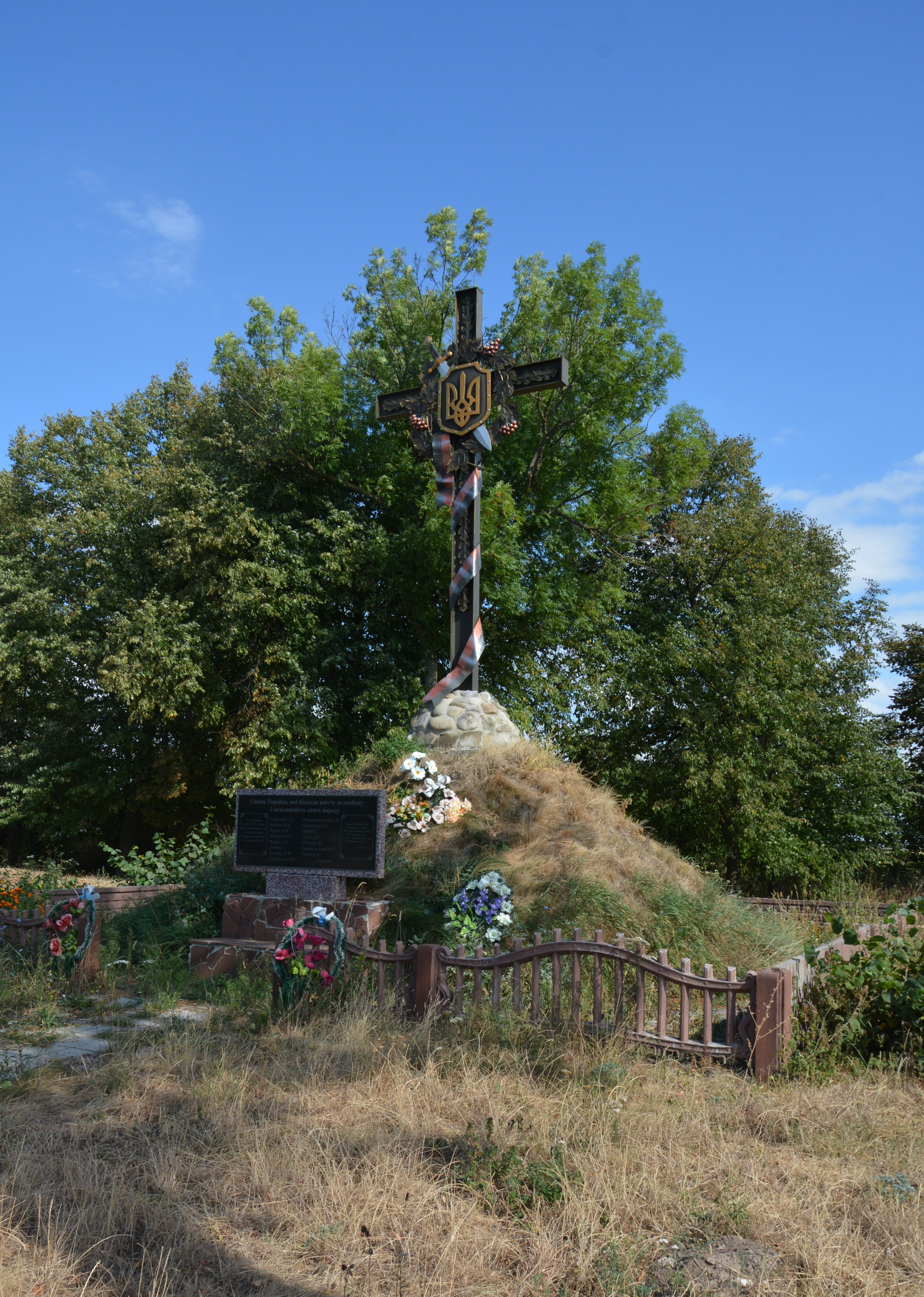
Memorial Cross in honour of Ukraine national liberation warriors

== See also ==
- Czechs in Ukraine
