= Embassy of Ukraine, Prague =

Diplomatic mission of Ukraine in the Czech Republic

Embassy of Ukraine in Prague
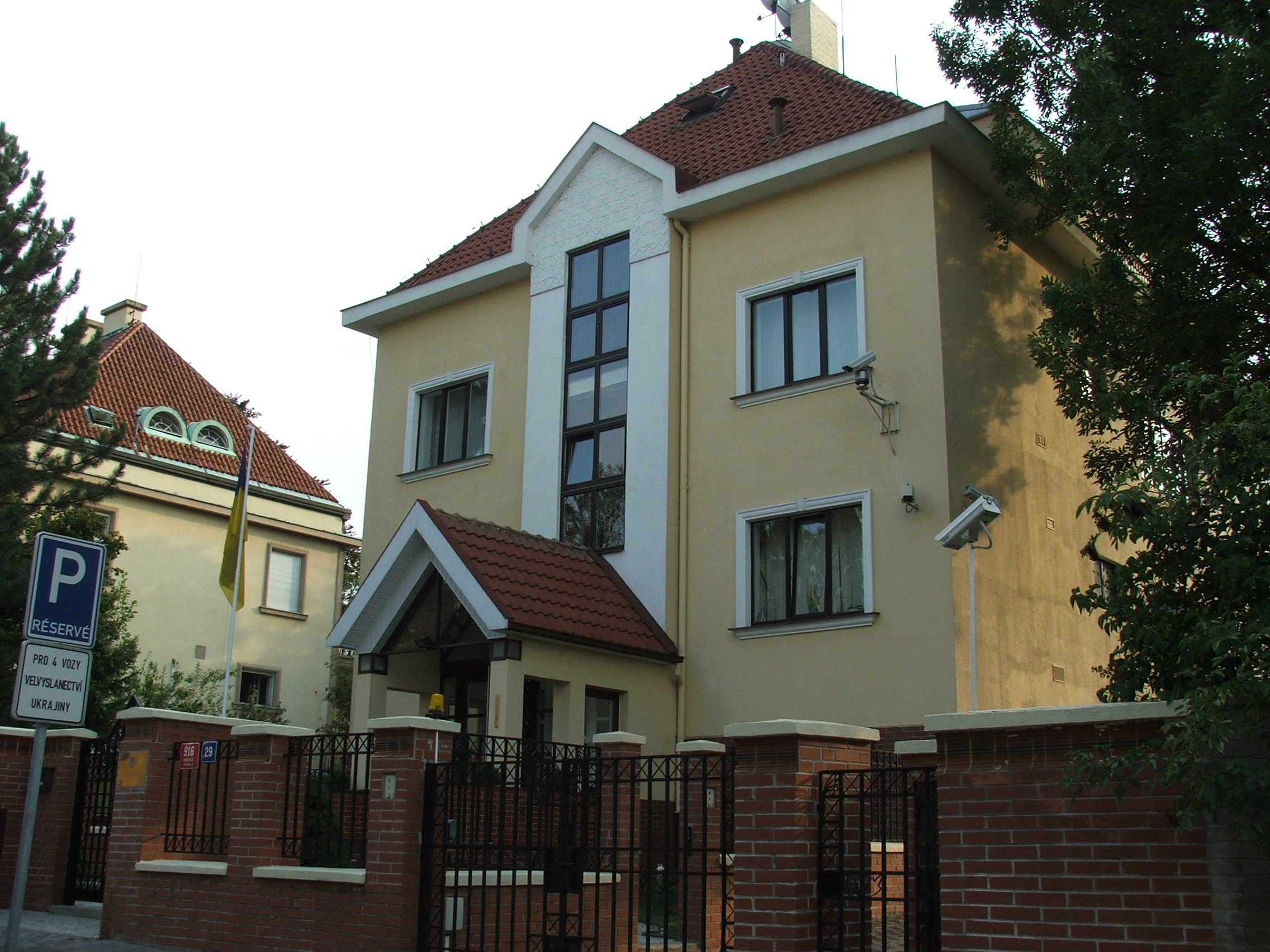
- Location: Prague
- Address: Charlese de Gaulla 29, 160 00, Prague 6, Czech Republic
- Coordinates: 50°6′19.7″N 14°23′54″E
- Ambassador: Vasyl Zvarych

The Embassy of Ukraine in Prague (Czech: Ukrajinské velvyslanectví v Praze) is the diplomatic mission of Ukraine in the Czech Republic.

== History ==
On 8 December 1991, Czechoslovakia recognized Ukraine after the previous declaration of independence by the Supreme Soviet of Ukraine (24 August 1991), which was later approved by the referendum on 1 December 1991. The Soviet Union would eventually be dissolved by the resigning Soviet president Mikhail Gorbachev (25 December 1991) and would formally split itself into Belarus, the Russian Federation and Ukraine by signing declarations in Białowieża Forest by its respective presidents (Lukashenko, Yeltsin, Kravchuk) on 26 December 1991.

On 30 January 1992, Ukraine and Czechoslovakia established official diplomatic relations.

After the dissolution of Czechoslovakia, Ukraine recognized and re-established diplomatic relations with both the Czech Republic and Slovakia on 1 January 1993.

Ukraine has consulates in Brno.

== Activities of the Embassy ==
The Embassy promotes the development of good neighborly relations between Ukraine and the Czech Republic at all levels to ensure the harmonious development of mutual relations and cooperation on issues of mutual interest.

The Embassy's priorities also include the care of numerous Ukrainian burial sites in the Czech Republic. During 2017–2019, the Ministry of Foreign Affairs of Ukraine paid for the lease for the next 10 years and repaired 36 places of memory.

The Embassy of Ukraine in the Czech Republic issued a statement condemning the anti-Ukrainian statements of former Czech President Václav Klaus and his support for the Kremlin's propaganda.

== Ambassadors ==
1. Maksym Slavinsky (1919)
2. Mykhailo Levytsky (1921–1923)
3. Roman Lubkivsky (1992–1995)
4. Andriy Ozadovsky (1995–1999)
5. Serhiy Ustych (1999–2004)
6. Ivan Kuleba (2004–2009)
7. Ivan Hrytsak (2009–2012)
8. Borys Zaychuk (2012–2016)
9. Yevhen Perebyinis (2017–2022)
10. Vitalij Usatyj (2022–2024)
11. Vasyl Zvarych (since 2024)

== See also ==
- Czech Republic–Ukraine relations
- Foreign relations of Czech Republic
- Foreign relations of Ukraine
- Diplomatic missions of Ukraine
- Dissolution of the Soviet Union
