= Ukrainians in the Czech Republic =

Ethnic group

Ukrainian citizens in the Czech Republic as of December 31, 2024
Year	Pop.	±%
2011	118,932	—
2012	112,549	−5.4%
2013	105,138	−6.6%
2016	110,245	+4.9%
2017	117,480	+6.6%
2018	131,302	+11.8%
2019	145,518	+10.8%
2020	165,654	+13.8%
2021	196,875	+18.8%
2022	636,282	+223.2%
2023	574,447	−9.7%
2024	589,456	+2.6%

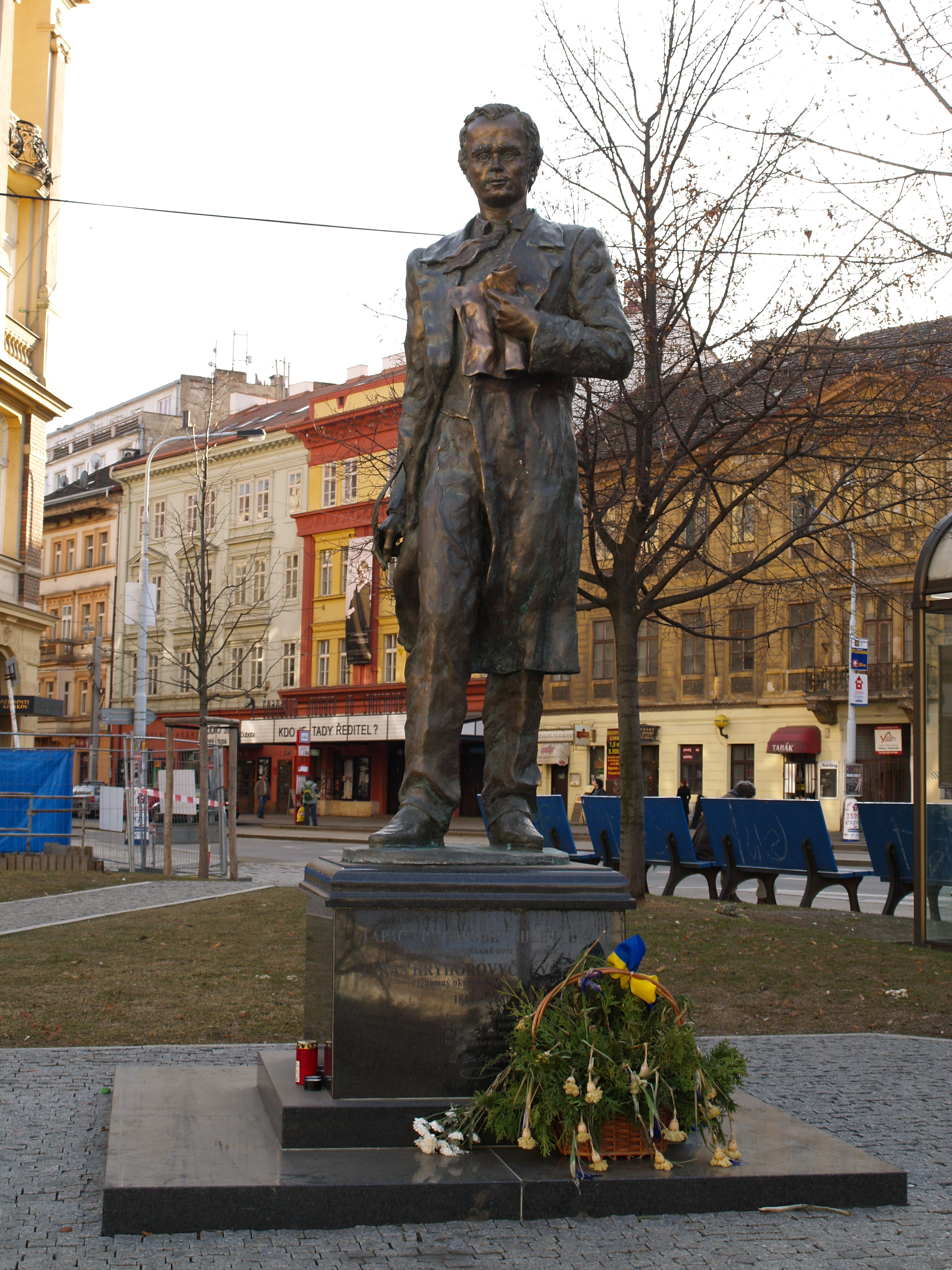
Sculpture of Ukrainian poet, artist and humanist Taras Shevchenko, Prague (inaugurated in 2009)

Ukrainians in the Czech Republic are the country's largest group of foreign nationals and a recognized national minority. The Ukrainian population grew substantially after 1990 and increased sharply following the Russian invasion of Ukraine in 2022.

At the end of 2025, 612,953 Ukrainian citizens were living in the Czech Republic, representing 54% of all foreign nationals in the country. In 2026, about 391,000 Ukrainians had status of temporary protection.

== History ==
Until the 20th century, most Ukrainians in Czech lands were students, soldiers, officials and seasonal labourers, the majority of whom did not settle in the country on a constant basis. In 1902, a Ukrainian community (hromada) was established by Ukrainian students in Prague. Many Ukrainians from Galicia fled to Czech territory as refugees during World War I. In 1914 a Ukrainian primary school was established in Nusle. Another Ukrainian school, a gymnasium, was active in Svatobořice, where around 1,200 Ukrainian refugees lived between 1917 and 1918.

Following the Polish-Ukrainian War, thousands of Ukrainian Galician Army soldiers were interned in camps at Něměcké Jablonné, Liberec and Josefov. They engaged in cultural work and published several newspapers. Many of the soldiers later moved to Slovakia and Transcarpathia, where they served as auxiliary guards. Many political émigrés from Galicia and Dnieper Ukraine settled in Czechoslovakia, seeing it as more democratic and friendly to immigrants that neighbouring Poland or Austria. In 1921 Ukrainian Free University transferred its activities from Vienna to Prague, and during the following years numerous Ukrainian educational and cultural institutions were established in the city. In 1922 a Ukrainian academy was established in Poděbrady. Until the early 1930s, Ukrainian institutions enjoyed support from the Czechoslovak government.

In total, up to 20,000 Ukrainians lived in the country during the early 1920s. Between 1921 and 1925 a Ukrainian civic committee functioned with the support of Czechoslovak authorities. As of 1925, 2,000 Ukrainian students received stipends from the state. Ukrainian student communities were active in Prague, Brno, Poděbrady, Příbram and Mělník. Several nationalist and Sovietophile youth societies emerged in their rows. Ukrainian doctors, lawyers, teachers and engineers were also represented by their profile organizations. In Prague, three Ukrainian scientific institutions were active. In 1923 a branch of the Ukrainian Women's Union was established in Czechoslovakia, and in 1927 the Ukrainian Sich Union was founded in Prague. Ukrainian Sokil and Plast societies were also active in the country.

During the 1930s, an increasing number of Ukrainians, most of them labour migrants, but also students, soldiers and officials, started arriving to Czech territories from Transcarpathia. In 1939, leadership of Carpatho-Ukraine headed by Avgustyn Voloshyn joined the ranks of political emigrants in the country. Under the German protectorate, the majority of Ukrainian organizations was disbanded. In 1943 two Ukrainian nationalist newspapers were shut down by Nazi authorities. Despite this, several Ukrainian educational organizations, including the Free Ukrainian University, were able to continue their activities until the end of the Second World War.

Following the arrival of Soviet troops to Czechoslovakia in 1945, most members of the local Ukrainian community moved to West Germany, and many of them later emigrated overseas. At the same time, many Ukrainians from Transcarpathia, including demobilized soldiers of Ludvík Svoboda's brigade, who did not wish to return under the Soviet rule, as well as labourers and students from the area of Priashiv, settled in Prague or in areas whose German population had been previously expelled. During the early postwar years, several hundred of Ukrainian migrants also arrived from Banat, settling in the areas of Tachov and Znojmo, as well as in Chomutov.

In 1948 the Ukrainian Museum in Prague was liquidated by authorities on accusations of "bourgeois nationalism", and in 1950 the Greek Catholic parish in Prague was subordinated to the Czechoslovak Orthodox Church. Despite the majority of Eastern Orthodox population in the country consisting of Ukrainians, its clergymen used predominantly Czech and Russian. Greek Catholic hierarchy in Czechoslovakia was restored in 1968, but the activities of Ukrainian organizations continued to be limited to cultural events such as music concerts, including tours by Ukrainian performers from the Soviet Union. According to official data from the 1980 Czechoslovak census, around 15,000 Ukrainians lived in the Czech part of the state.

Labour migration from Ukraine or southeast Slovakia to what is now the Czech Republic began to grow to a large scale in the early 1990s. In 1991, there were just 8,500 Ukrainian citizens on Czech territory. However, as of October 2018, figures of the Czech Statistical Office showed that number had grown to 132,481, making Ukrainians the largest group of foreigners in the Czech Republic, with a 30% share of the foreign population.

Following the Russian invasion of Ukraine on 24 February 2022, the number of Ukrainians within the country increased drastically as thousands fled the war. As of 31 July 2023, over 357,000 refugees from Ukraine have been given temporary protection status within the Czech Republic, making the country the third largest destination for Ukrainians in the European Union. Prime Minister Petr Fiala announced extensive aid to Ukraine and its citizens, including the provision of military equipment. The Czech Republic provides protection to refugees from Ukraine and financial support to refugees.

== Czech registered public organizations with the status of a legal entity ==
- International association "Ukrainian Freedom", president: Bohdan Kostiv. Official pages
- International non-governmental organization "Coordination Resource Center", General director: Olexandr Petrenko. Official pages
- Rodyna, z.s., leader: Yosyp Klymkovych. Official pages
- Společnost Ivana Kondura, leaders: Jiří Klán, Petr Novák, Lenka Kondurová. Official pages
- Ukrainian Business Club in Czech Republic z.s., chairman: Taras Yakubovskyi
- Ukrajinská iniciativa v České republice, z.s., leaders: Viktor Rajčinec. Official pages
- Ukrajinská iniciativa jižní Moravy z.s., leaders: Marija Wazi-Nobilisová. Official pages
- Ukrajinská tradice v České republice, z.s., leader: Bohdan Rajčinec. Mirror of Ukrajinská iniciativa v České republice; same location, same statutes etc.
- Misie Ukrajinské Pravoslavné Církve v České republice, z.s., leaders: Oleksandr Schramko
- Ukrajinské kulturní a informační centrum, start 9 March 1996.

The main activities of international organizations, in particular, the "International non-governmental organization “Coordination Resource Center”" also include issues of the electoral process in Ukraine and monitoring it.

== Ukrainian mass media in the Czech Republic ==
- CRCMedia — European Diaspora News
- Ukrainian newspapers in the Czech Republic — Ukrainian news in the Czechia
- JARMART - cultural and historical newsletter — Ukrainian portal, news, video, internet

== Periodicals in Ukrainian ==
- Porohy — political and cultural magazine in Ukrainian, sometimes in Czech
- Ukrainian journal — journal in Czech or Ukrainian
- Mandrivnyk - Czech and Ukrainian literary magazine - magazine in Ukrainian

== Bibliography ==
- Markus, V. (1994), "Ukrainians in the Czech and Slovak Republic", in Pawliczko, A. L. (ed.), Ukraine and Ukrainians throughout the World: The Demographic and Sociological Guide to the Homeland and Its Diaspora, Toronto: University of Toronto Press, pp. 147–159, ISBN 978-0-8020-7200-9
- Nekorjak, M. (2006), "Klientský systém a ukrajinská pracovní migrace do České republiky", Sociální studia, 3 (1): 89–109, doi:10.5817/SOC2006-1-89, ISSN 1214-813X
  - An English version was also presented as a conference paper, Čermáková, D; Nekorjak, M. (2007), "Ukrainian Middleman System of Labour Organization in the Czech Republic" (PDF), Mezinárodní migrace a nelegální pracovní aktivity migrantů v Česku v širším evropském kontextu, Tijdschrift voor Economische en Sociale Geografie, Charles University
- Cizinci podle typu pobytu, pohlaví a státního občanství/Foreigners: by type of residence, sex and citizenship (PDF), Czech Statistical Office, 31 October 2009

== See also ==
- Czech Republic–Ukraine relations
- Czechs in Ukraine
- Ukrainian diaspora
- Immigration to the Czech Republic
- Ruthenians and Ukrainians in Czechoslovakia (1918–1938)
- Ukrainians in Slovakia
