= Czechs in Ukraine =

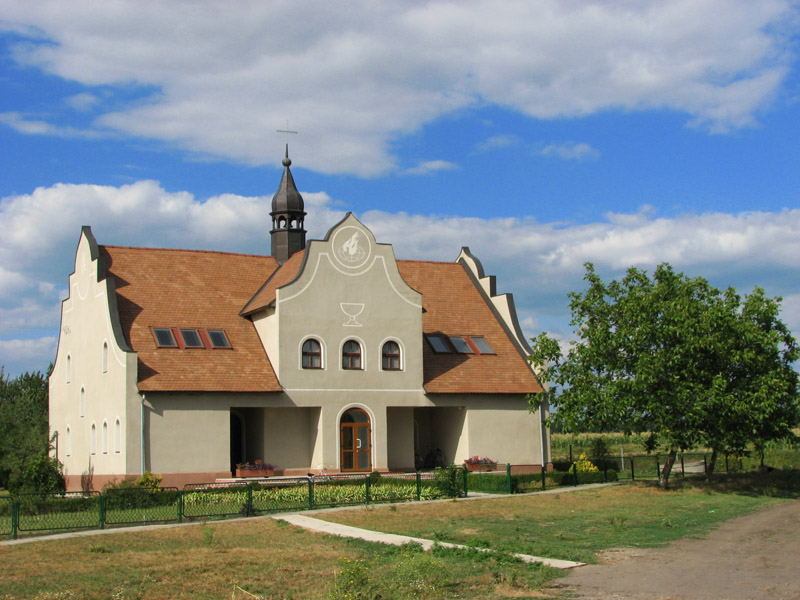
- Czech chapel in Bohemka, built in 1996

Total population
- 5,917 (2001)-11,000

Regions with significant populations
- Zhytomyr, Lutsk

Languages
- Czech, Ukrainian, Russian

Religion
- Irreligion (majority) · Roman Catholic (minority)

Related ethnic groups
- Slovaks in Ukraine

Czechs in Ukraine are ethnic Czechs or their descendants that reside in Ukraine. Particularly, Volhynian Czechs (Czech: Volyňští Češi) settled mostly in the Volhynia Governorate of the Russian Empire in the second half of the 19th century.

== History ==
Between 1868 and 1880, almost 16,000 Czechs left Austria-Hungary for the Russian Empire. The reasons for their departure were the difficult living conditions in the Czech lands, and the rumors of prosperity in the Russian realm, where there was a large amount of unused agricultural land. After the collapse of the Polish January Uprising against Russian rule (Volhynia was part of Poland prior to the Second and Third Partition of Poland, carried out in 1793 and 1795, respectively), harsh reprisals against the Poles followed. The Russian government imposed taxes on the Polish landed gentry or even confiscated Polish estates. The local government in the region attracted new immigrants with a number of advantages, such as the right to purchase their own land for low prices and the establishment of manufacturing businesses. Also, they gave the migrants the right to national education, self-government and religious freedom. Immigrants were exempt for 20 years from tax and exonerated from military duty.

The bulk of the Czechs settled in the region of Volhynia. Some villages were set up in flat meadows, while others were located near existing Ukrainian villages. Local Czech names for the villages they lived in were formed from the original name of the village, which was supplemented with the word "Czech" (e.g. České Noviny, Český Malín, Český Boratín, Český Straklov, etc.). Apart from agriculture, Czech immigrants began to engage in other activities, such as industry, trade, and crafts. The income for most ethnic Czechs had its foundations in the engineering, breweries, mills, cement plants, etc. In their communities, schools, churches, and libraries were founded, and because of this, cultural and social life flourished. Czech immigrants have made a major contribution to increasing the economic and cultural level in the built-up areas.

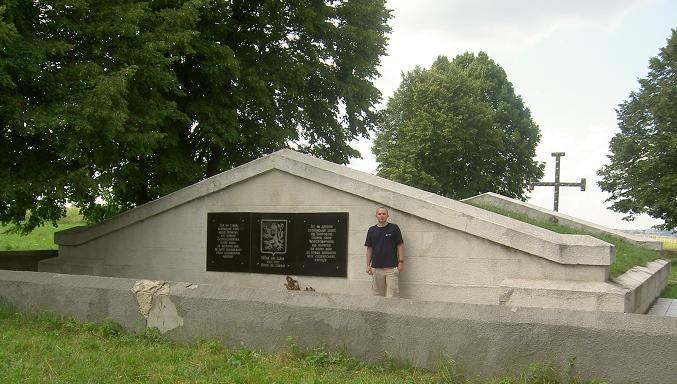
Memorial for the dead of the Czechoslovak Legion in the battle of Zborov (1917) in Kalynivka

Outside Volhynia, in 1905, the Czechs founded the village of Bohemka, nowadays part of the Mykolaiv Oblast.

After the outbreak of World War I, Volhynian Czechs fought as members of the Russian army in the so-called Czech League, which later became the birthplace of the Czech legions in Russia to come.

=== Interwar period ===
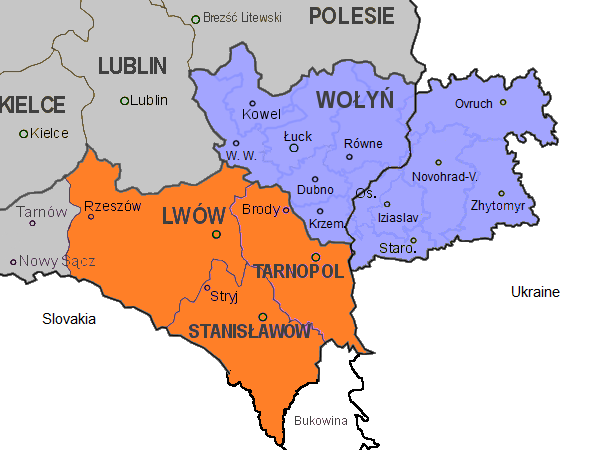
Volhynia in 1939

After the Soviet-Polish War, which ended in 1921 with the defeat of the Red Army, Volhynia was divided. The western half was recovered by Poland, while the eastern part became part of the newly established Soviet Union. While the Czech villages on the Polish side gradually renewed and modernized, the populations of the villages in Ukraine became victims of the violent national policy of the Soviet government. They limited Czech education, culture, and religion. Many lost their property, and were violently forced out of their homes by kolkhozs. Representatives mainly touched upon the Czech intelligentsia, but did not escape any component of the population. Many Volhynian Czechs were sentenced to death, or were virtually so in the gulags – which happened to many minorities at the time. In 1938, a complete ban on teaching in or about the Czech language was issued.

Volhynian Czechs were the largest group of the Czechs in interbellum Poland. One of their main centers was Kvasyliv. In the 1930s, as a result of Polish–Czechoslovak border conflicts, Czechs also experienced trouble in Poland, where anti-Czech propaganda was distributed by the government. This resulted in the demands of the Polish population to liquidate Czech education, or to withdraw land from Czech peasants.

=== World War II ===
When the Soviet Union occupied eastern Poland in 1939, the two parts of Volhynia were reunited. However, it was occupied by Nazi Germany in 1941. In July 1942, the first Czechoslovak Independent Field Battalion was formed. In 1943, the 1st Czechoslovak Independent Brigade was established, which numbered 3,517 soldiers. Volhynian men who fought in the ranks of the Red Army, but also those who were in Soviet captivity, reported themselves to these troops. Some of them even left to fight with Czech units in Western Europe, as many escaped Polish troops did as well. The situation of Volhynian Czechs living in villages under the German occupation administration did not change much. The Soviet violence was replaced by violence of the Ukrainian Nationalist Organization, but especially that of the SS, who burned several villages and massacred the local population. On July 13, 1943, the Germans burned the village of Český Malín to the ground, with people, including the elderly, women, and children, being burned alive in the buildings. In total, there were 374 Czech citizens. In the autumn of the same year, the Nazis were murdered by another Czech village, Sergiyevka-Mikna. In March 1944 the Czechs from the resort Volyňských Rovno resort relocated to the First Czechoslovak Independent Brigade, which recruited former compatriots. 12,000 Volhynian Czechs entered the troops, including six hundred women. Thanks to this, the First Czechoslovak Army Corps, which had passed the battle route to Prague, became the brigade.

=== May 1945 and the following years ===
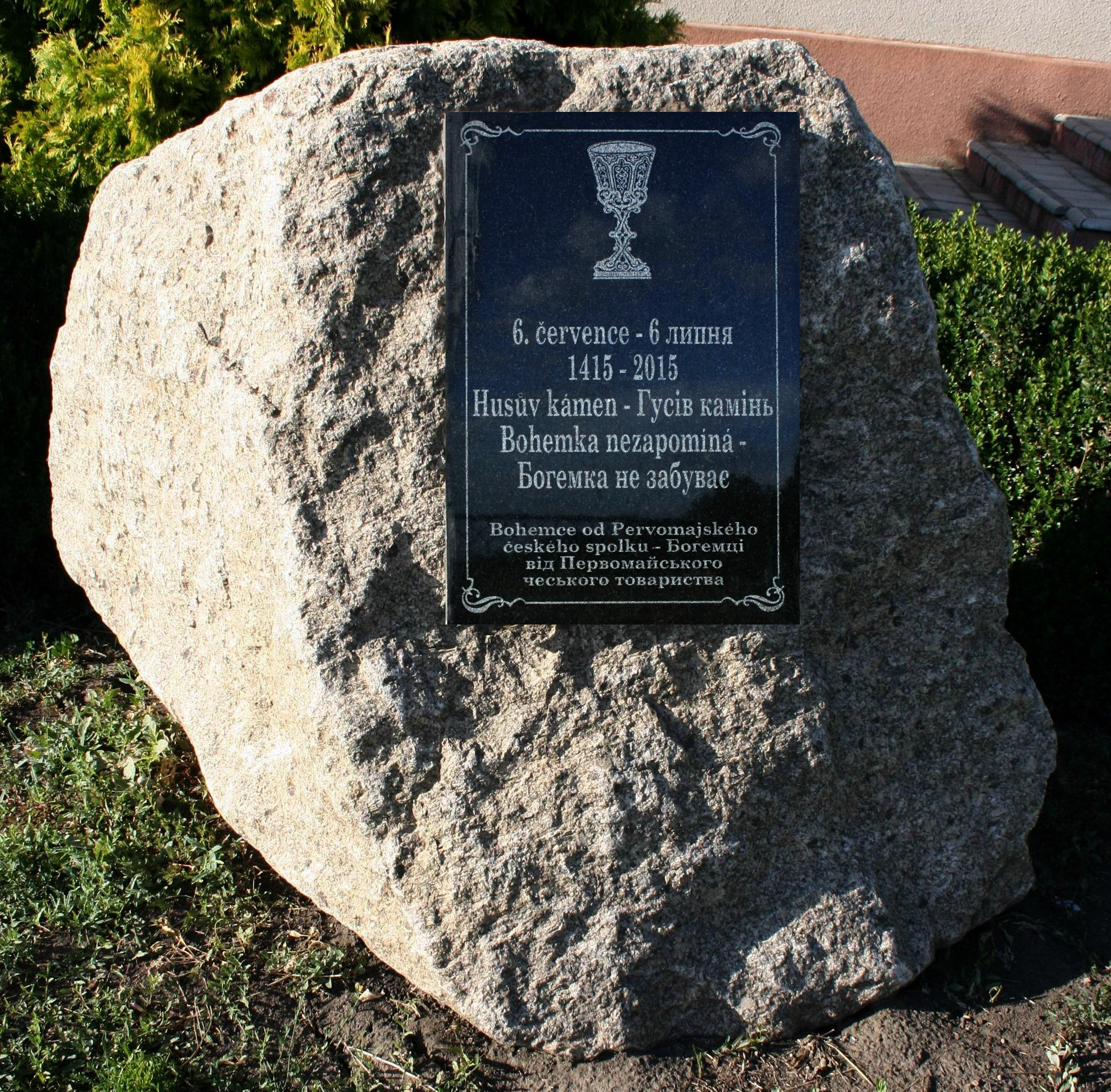
Jan Hus memorial stone in the village of Bohemka (2015)

After the liberation of Czechoslovakia, the Volhynian Czechs who were members of the Czechoslovak brigades remained. After the war, the door of re-emigration for Volhynian Czechs to Czechoslovakia opened on the basis of an interstate agreement between the Czechoslovak Republic and the Soviet Union. The first transport was welcomed in Žatec at the beginning of 1947, when Czechoslovakia began to come not only to those who lived in the USSR but also to those who returned from forced labor on the former territory of the Third Reich. In total, there were approximately 40,000 people. Most of them were settled in territories from which the Sudeten Germans had been expelled. Many Volhynian Czechs gave information about life in the Soviet Union and warned about the setting up of kolkhozes, etc. After Czechoslovakia became a formally communist nation in 1948, Ukrainian Czech truth-sayers were persecuted. Some Volhynian Czechs remained in the Soviet Union even after the end of the Second World War. Of those who did not emigrate, a great majority were in inter-ethnic marriages - which thus did not allow them to leave. Mostly, they were women with ethnic Ukrainian husbands. Some others stayed of their own choice.

During the Soviet era, they were one of the most affected groups by the Chernobyl nuclear power plant disaster in 1986. At the end of the 1980s, ten thousand Czechs lived in Ukraine. At the beginning of the 90s Czechoslovakia invited these remaining Czechs to return to the Czech Republic, which in 1993 almost 2,000 people did, and other people came to the Czech Republic in later years. As of today, Volhynian Czechs are still migrating.

In 2014, after the Maidan revolution in Ukraine and the occupation of Crimea by Russia, some of the Volhynian Czechs from Zhytomyr Oblast expressed their interest in returning to their ancestral homeland.

== See also ==
- Czech Republic–Ukraine relations
- Czech diaspora
- Ethnic groups in Ukraine
- Ukrainians in the Czech Republic
