= Three Kings (TV series) =

Czech war television series

- DVD cover
- Genre: Adventure War drama
- Written by: Ondřej Vogeltanz
- Directed by: Karel Kachyňa
- Starring: Vladimír Javorský; Karel Heřmánek; Jan Vlasák; Josef Carda; Valérie Zawadská
- Country of origin: Czech Republic
- Original language: Czech
- No. of seasons: 1
- No. of episodes: 7

Production
- Running time: 49 minutes

Original release
- Network: ČT1
- Release: May 4 – June 15, 1998

Three Kings (Czech: Tři králové) is a Czech war series that was aired in 1998. It is loosely based on story of members of resistance organization Obrana národa who were known as Three Kings. This group consisted of Josef Balabán, Václav Morávek and Josef Mašín.

== Plot ==
The series is loosely based on story of Three Kings - Josef Balabán, Václav Morávek and Josef Mašín. After their country is occupied by Nazi Germany they join resistance organisation Obrana národa. They lead brave but already lost fight against occupants.

== Cast and characters ==
- Vladimír Javorský as Václav Morávek, main protagonist of the series and the youngest of three; known as a religious gunslinger, or Leon. His personal motto is: "I believe in God and in my pistols".
- Karel Heřmánek as Josef Mašín, member of the group, the only one with a family. He is later captured and tortured.
- Jan Vlasák as Josef Balabán, oldest member and leader of the group. He is later captured and executed.
- Josef Carda as Paul Holm, agent who gives information to the "Three Kings"
- Valérie Zawadská as Evelyna Sekotová, photographer who hides the group; love interest of Morávek
- Ljuba Krbová as Zdena Mašínová, wife of Josef Mašín
- Jan Hrušínský as Major, resistance member who is in touch with the "Three Kings".
- David Matásek as Fešák, resistance member who acts as Morávek's adjutant.
- Michal Dlouhý as Frajer, resistance member; signalman who helps the "Three Kings" to communicate with London.

== Production ==
The series was filmed in 1998. Shooting took place at various locations in Prague. Largest problem for filmmakers was to giver Prague atmosphere of Protectorate of Bohemia and Moravia as locations that weren't changed since World War II almost didn't exist in Prague anymore. Creators of the series aimed to remind "forgotten" fate of Three Kings but also aimed to demystify their story. Historian Vilém Čermák acted as a consultant on the series. First episode was broadcast on 4 May 1998.

== Episodes ==
No.	Title	Directed by	Written by	Original release date
1	"Depeše pro Londýn (Dispatch for London)"	Karel Kachyňa	Ondřej Vogeltanz	May 4, 1998
Mid-1940. Lt. Col. Mašín meets captain Morávek. Morávek speaks German well and is tasked by Lt. Col. Balabán to become a liaison with a German spy Dr. Holm who is codenamed René. Holm is a very valuable source of information for the resistance and for Czechoslovak government-in-exile. He is to send reports to London through our officers. Captain Morávek and Holm meet the agent's lover in a dressing room of a choir singer, and their collaboration will be at the heart of the story of the entire series.
2	"Nosiči vody (Water Bearers)"	Karel Kachyňa	Ondřej Vogeltanz	May 11, 1998
Mašín, Josef Balabán and Václav Morávek established contact with a prominent German agent Dr. Holm who is a civilian employee of the Abwehr in Prague. Holm wants money for his reports but the information he gives is useful. Already the first intelligence action of "Three Kings" brought success to the Allies. "Three Kings" handled their intelligence task with confidence.
3	"Přívěsek (Bangle)"	Karel Kachyňa	Ondřej Vogeltanz	May 18, 1998
"Three Kings" are forced to lower their self-confidence with which they had worked in the resistance until now. Maintaining regular contact with Dr. Holm and sending important information to London is successful. President Beneš himself sends a commendatory dispatch to the "three kings", but situation for resistance in Prague gets worse during autumn 1940. They have problems with money, Morávek's hazardous pranks and even with the leadership of resistance. Women also play their role in the story from the beginning, and one of them, Holm's former lover Laura siddenly enters Morávek's life. Morávek also makes a fatal mistake, which has tragic consequences. Balabán and Laura are arrested while the radio is tracked down. Mašín loses a key with a pendant during escape. Only advantage Morávek and Mašín have is that Gestapo does not have their photo...
4	"Náhradní spojení (Spare contact)"	Karel Kachyňa	Ondřej Vogeltanz	May 25, 1998
Balabán was captured by Gestapo, and only two of "three kings" remain. Morávek blames himself his arrest as he did make some mistakes. Colonel Mašín just barely escapes from one raid. In the process, he loses key to another illegal studio apartment, from which an important report relating to the invasion of the USSR needs to be broadcast. It is too dangerous to appear there as Gestapo could know about it. Mašín acquires a new identity thanks to photographer Sekotová and he secretly visits his wife and children for the last time...
5	"Na dně (At the bottom)"	Karel Kachyňa	Ondřej Vogeltanz	May 1, 1998
Mašín leads a fearless counterattack from a studio hopelessly surrounded by Gestapo and thus helps Morávek and signalman Fredy to escape but he himself gets captured and heavily shotlies in the SS infirmary. He refuses to testify under oath. Morávek is also injured. He finds refuge at devoted friend of the "three kings", photographer Evelyna Sekotová. He intends to save Mašín from capture.
6	"Zrada (Betrayal)"	Karel Kachyňa	Ondřej Vogeltanz	May 8, 1998
Morávek and dr. Holm plan to save wounded Mašín from SS infirmary. However the plan fails. But Moravek does not give up even when Evelyna's apartment becomes the next address that the Gestapo discovers. and Evelyna is captured. With Heydrich's accession to the office of Reich Protector, the terror in the country escalates even more and Balabán is executed.
7	"Pobožný střelec (Religious Gunslinger)"	Karel Kachyňa	Ondřej Vogeltanz	June 15, 1998
The story of the "three kings" comes to a close. Moravek is trying to get help from the London government but doesn't get any responses. He and Holm remain alone without connection in a frightened, indifferent and treacherous Prague. A similar fate binds two men together in a special friendship.
