= Zdena Mašínová Jr. =

Czech anti-communist and political prisoner (1933–2026)

Zdena Mašínová
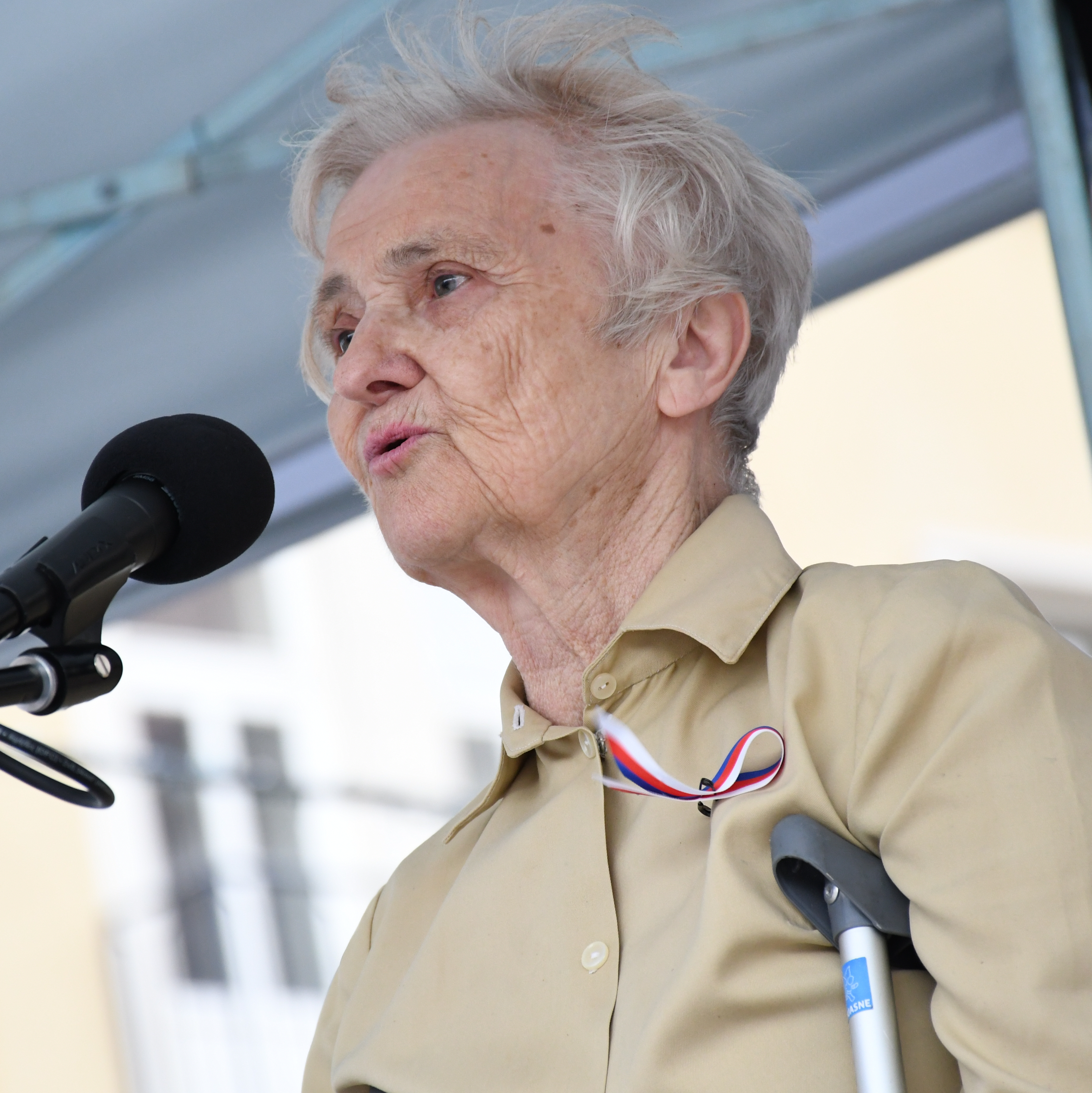
- Mašínová in 2018
- Born: 7 November 1933; Prague, Czechoslovakia
- Died: 10 June 2026 (aged 92)
- Occupation: Political activist
- Known for: Political activism; association with the anti-communist resistance family Mašín
- Parent(s): Josef Mašín (father); Zdena Mašínová Sr. (mother)
- Relatives: Ctirad Mašín (brother); Josef Mašín (brother)
- Awards: Order of Tomáš Garrigue Masaryk (First Class) (2023)

Zdena Mašínová (7 November 1933 – 10 June 2026) was a Czech political activist who had been a political prisoner earlier in life.

Mašínová was the daughter of resistance fighter Josef Mašín and the sister of Josef and Ctirad Mašín, members of the anti-communist resistance group known as the Mašín brothers. Throughout her life, she was closely associated with the legacy of resistance against both Nazi and Communist regimes in Czechoslovakia.

== Early life ==
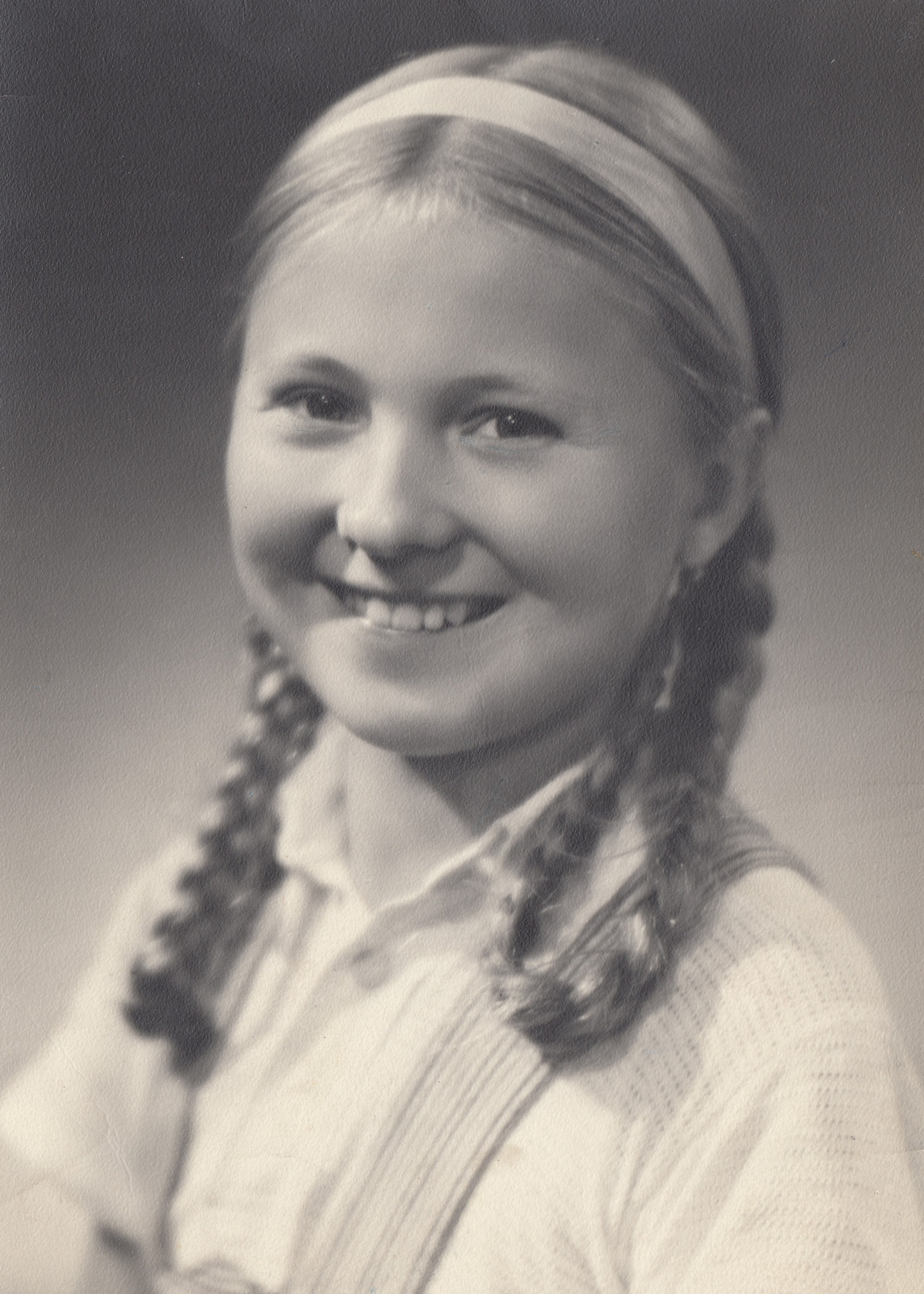
Mašínová in 1945

Mašínová was born in Prague into a prominent military and resistance family. Her father, Josef Mašín, was a career officer in the Czechoslovak Army and a veteran of the Russian legions during World War I. During the German occupation of Czechoslovakia, he became a leading figure in the resistance movement Obrana národa and was part of the intelligence group known as the Three Kings, alongside Josef Balabán and Václav Morávek. Following her father's arrest by the Gestapo in 1941 and his execution in 1942, the family came under increasing pressure. Her mother, Zdena Mašínová Sr., was also involved in resistance activities and was later imprisoned after the communist takeover in 1948.

Mašínová spent part of her childhood separated from her parents due to wartime conditions and political persecution. She also suffered from a congenital medical condition affecting her lower limbs, which required long periods of treatment in medical facilities. After the communist takeover of Czechoslovakia in 1948, the Mašín family became a target of state security services. Mašínová and her relatives were subjected to surveillance, interrogation, and repeated pressure from the State Security (StB). Her mother was arrested and sentenced to a long prison term for alleged anti-state activities. Her uncle, Ctibor Novák, was also prosecuted and executed in the 1950s. Mašínová herself was repeatedly interrogated and closely monitored, including through informants within her social circle.

Her mother died in prison in 1956, after years of imprisonment under harsh conditions. Mašínová was permitted only limited contact with her during incarceration.

== Later life and death ==
In the late 1950s, Mašínová relocated to Prague, where she was only able to find work in low-skilled positions, including laboratory glass washing in medical facilities. Despite ongoing surveillance and political restrictions, she maintained contact with her brothers, who had fled Czechoslovakia following their armed resistance activities against the communist regime in the early 1950s.

In 1969, she was briefly able to travel abroad to East Germany, marking one of her few opportunities to leave Czechoslovakia during the communist period.

Mašínová died on 10 June 2026, at the age of 92.

== Recognition and legacy ==
Following the fall of communism in 1989, Mašínová became an important public figure in discussions about resistance to totalitarian regimes in Czechoslovakia. She was associated with efforts to preserve the memory of victims of both Nazi and communist persecution, particularly within her own family.

In 2023, she was awarded the Order of Tomáš Garrigue Masaryk, First Class, by Czech President Petr Pavel, in recognition of her contribution to the struggle for democracy and human rights.
