= Antonín Kollert =

Czech mathematician and WWII resistance fighter

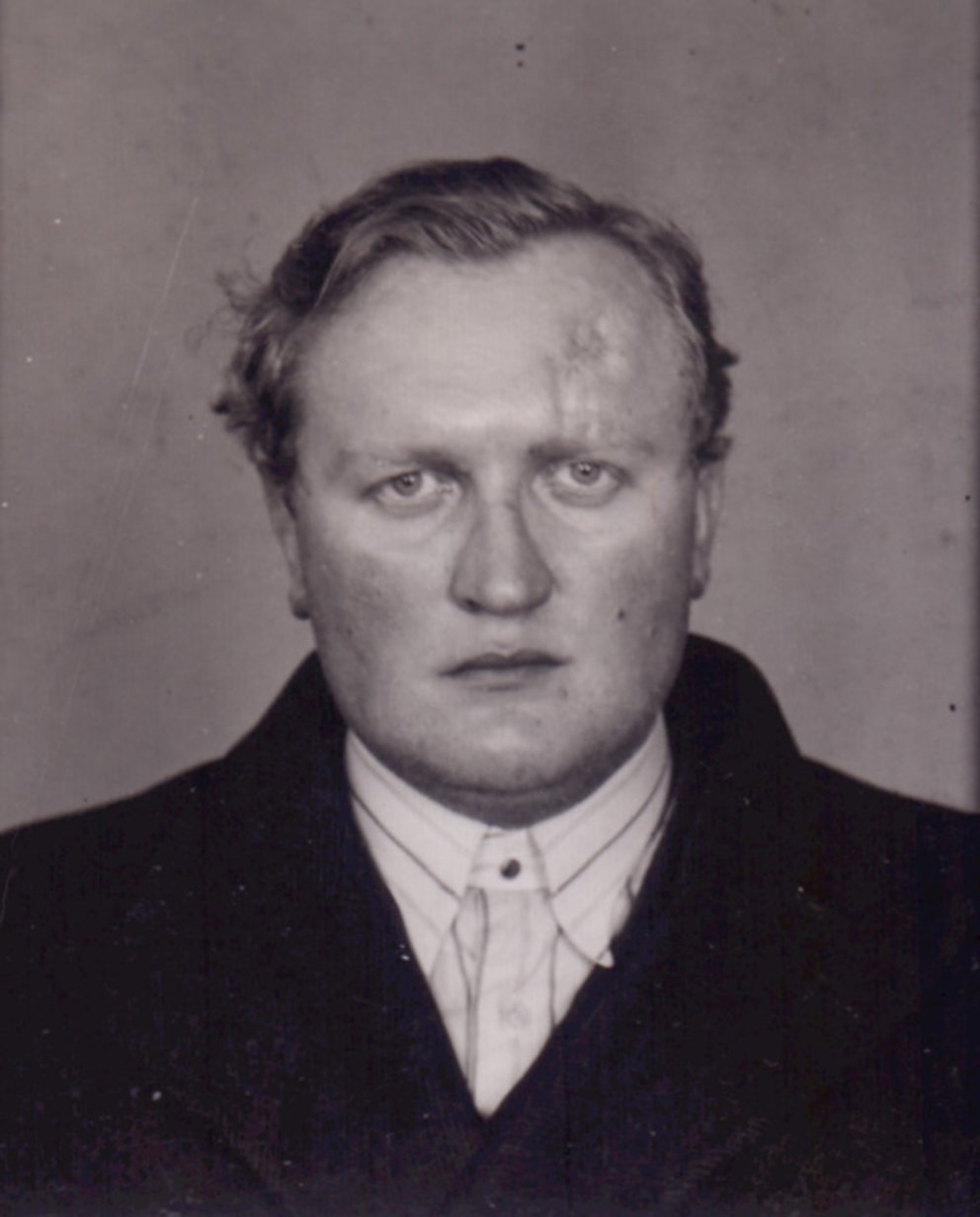
- Born: 1 April 1907; Horní Radechová, Bohemia, Austria-Hungary
- Died: 2 October 1942 (aged 35); Berlin, Nazi Germany
- Cause of death: Execution

Antonín Kollert (18 April 1907 – 2 October 1942) was a Czech actuary and a member of the Czech resistance against Nazi Germany.

== Life ==
Kollert was born on 18 April 1907 in Horní Radechová in Bohemia, Austria-Hungary. He graduated from a gymnasium in Náchod and in 1929 he graduated in actuarial mathematics from Czech Technical University in Prague. Then he was a student of professor Emil Schoenbaum at Charles University, where he received a doctorate in 1931 with a thesis on the theory of risk. He worked as a secretary of the mathematical division of the Praha insurance company. He studied law while working there and in the year 1938 he received a law doctorate. He was a member of the committee of the Association of Czechoslovak Insurance Technicians.

Kollert died on 2 October 1942 in Berlin.

== Resistance ==
From 1937 he was a member of the Czechoslovak People's Party, later a member of the Republican Party of Farmers and Peasants. From December 1939 he was a member of the Sokol movement.

Antonín Kollert was involved in the resistance group around Josef Jošt, primarily in the illegal flight of Czechoslovak army members to asylum in foreign countries, which he partially financially supported himself. In January 1940 he was arrested as a member of the resistance group Obrana národa. On 24 April 1942 he was sentenced by the People's Court to the capital punishment for the preparation of high treason and abetting the enemy and he was executed in the Berlin-Plötzensee jail along with three others.

He is one of the victims commemorated by the plaque in Hanspaulka, Prague.
