= Rick McCallum =

American film producer

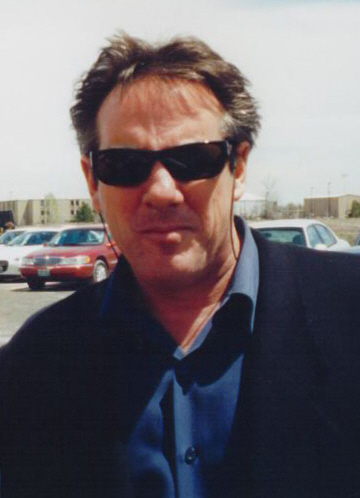
- McCallum in 2007
- Born: Richard McCallum; August 22, 1954 (age 72); Heidelberg, West Germany
- Occupation: Film producer
- Children: 1
- Relatives: Michael York (stepfather)

Richard McCallum (born August 22, 1954) is an American film producer known for his work on The Young Indiana Jones Chronicles as well as the Star Wars Special Editions and Prequel Trilogy. He is best known for his frequent collaborations with American filmmaker George Lucas, though he was also a long-time producer for British television playwright Dennis Potter, most notably on The Singing Detective and Dreamchild.

== Early career and collaboration with Dennis Potter ==
McCallum's career as producer began with Pennies from Heaven (1981), the film version of the 1978 BBC TV drama, for director Herbert Ross and writer Dennis Potter. After the commercial failure of the film, Potter invited McCallum to go to work in England. During the 1980s, McCallum's work with Potter included producing the films Dreamchild (1985), an unusual exploration by Potter of the creation of Alice's Adventures in Wonderland, which was nominated for two BAFTA awards, and Track 29 directed by Nicolas Roeg; executive producing the landmark BBC-TV series The Singing Detective; and in 1989 producing the Potter-directed TV series Blackeyes.

During the 1980s, McCallum also produced movies with filmmakers including David Hare (Strapless); Neil Simon (I Ought to Be in Pictures); Harvey Fierstein, whose HBO film Tidy Endings received two CableACE Awards; and Nicolas Roeg's Castaway. McCallum also produced the music video for the Rolling Stones' "Undercover of the Night", directed by Julien Temple.

== Collaboration with George Lucas ==
He first met George Lucas on the set of Dreamchild.

=== The Young Indiana Jones Chronicles ===
Several years after their first meeting, Lucas was preparing his first weekly live-action television program, The Young Indiana Jones Chronicles, and turned to McCallum to produce the ambitious series, which was to be shot in 35 countries. With a unique perspective on the eventful early life of Indiana Jones – including its cinematic qualities, an emphasis on storytelling and characters, and an enticing promise of new adventures each week – McCallum helped attract a list of writers and actors to the creative ranks of the series. Among the directors with whom McCallum worked on the series were Bille August, Nicolas Roeg, David Hare, Mike Newell, Deepa Mehta, Terry Jones, Gavin Millar, Simon Wincer, and Carl Schultz. During its run, the Academy of Television Arts & Sciences honored Young Indiana Jones with 12 Emmy Awards from 26 nominations. The series debuted on DVD in 2007, and McCallum served alongside Lucas as a joint executive producer on a series of 94 documentaries that accompany the episodes and illuminate the real-life history behind their stories.

=== Radioland Murders ===
When Young Indiana Jones ended, McCallum produced Radioland Murders (1994), for which Lucas served as executive producer and the originator of the story.

=== Star Wars ===
During production of Radioland Murders, Lucas confided to McCallum his plans for three new Star Wars movies. To further test the nascent digital technology just then becoming available, in part from developments they made on Young Indiana Jones, McCallum produced revised versions of A New Hope, The Empire Strikes Back, and Return of the Jedi – released in 1997 as the Special Editions.

Assembling the teams that worked both in front of and behind the cameras, McCallum produced the next three films, which Lucas wrote and directed: Star Wars: Episode I – The Phantom Menace (1999), Star Wars: Episode II – Attack of the Clones (2002) and Star Wars: Episode III – Revenge of the Sith (2005). The Star Wars prequels also ushered in a new era of digital filmmaking, and McCallum played a leading role in its development, overseeing a team of creative and technical professionals that developed and created the industry's first all-digital production pipeline. McCallum makes a cameo appearance in The Phantom Menace near the end of the film when Palpatine arrives on Naboo.

=== Red Tails ===
McCallum was one of the producers of Red Tails, an action-adventure movie on which Lucas was executive producer, that pays tribute to the spirit of World War II's Tuskegee Airmen. The movie was released nationally in the U.S. on January 20, 2012.

=== Retirement from Lucasfilm ===
Following Lucasfilm's announced acquisition by The Walt Disney Company, on October 31, 2012, ForceCast.net podcast Lucasfilm's Steve Sansweet stated that "Rick has retired from Lucasfilm". He had been involved with a potential live-action series set within the Star Wars universe, but the show was put on hold in 2010 due to budget concerns.

== Post-Lucasfilm career ==
After leaving Lucasfilm, McCallum settled in Prague in Czechia. His Prague-based company, Film United, develops film projects and provides production services for Czech and European feature films. Films that McCallum has developed include R'ha, a science fiction feature film based on an earlier short film, directed by Kaleb Lechowski and written by Matthew Graham; In the Fog, a World War II film by Ukrainian director Sergei Loznitsa; So Far So Good (Zatím dobrý), based on the novel by Jan Novák about the Mašín brothers; and (as executive producer) A Long Way Home, directed by Paki Smith and written by Alex Rose.

== Personal life ==
McCallum's mother, photographer Patricia York, is married to actor Michael York. His father, Roy Alwood McCallum, was a U.S. military pilot. McCallum's daughter, Olivia 'Mousy' McCallum, also works in the film industry.
