= Brothers (2023 film) =

- Theatrical release poster
- Directed by: Tomáš Mašín
- Screenplay by: Marek Epstein
- Based on: Gauntlet by Barbara Mašín
- Produced by: Petr Bílek
- Starring: Jan Nedbal; Oskar Hes
- Cinematography: Friede Clausz
- Production companies: FilmBrigade; Czech Television
- Distributed by: CinemArt
- Release date: 26 October 2023
- Running time: 135 minutes
- Countries: Czech Republic; Germany; Slovakia
- Language: Czech
- Budget: 81,600,000 CZK
- Box office: 20,498,223 CZK

Brothers (Czech: Bratři) is a 2023 historical action drama film directed by Tomáš Mašín from a screenplay written by Marek Epstein. The film is based on the nonfiction book Gauntlet by Barbara Mašín. It is based on the story of Josef Mašín and Ctirad Mašín. The film was selected as the Czech entry for the Best International Feature Film at the 96th Academy Awards, although it was not nominated.

== Plot ==
The film follows the story of Josef and Ctirad Mašín, sons of Josef Mašín, who from 1951 to 1953 put up armed resistance against the communist regime in Czechoslovakia.

== Cast ==
- Oskar Hes as Josef Mašín
- Jan Nedbal as Ctirad Mašín
- Adam Ernest as Milan Paumer
- Matyáš Řezníček as Václav Švéda
- Tony Mašek as Zbyněk Janata
- Tatiana Dyková as Zdena Mašínová
- Karolína Lea Nováková as Nenda Mašínová
- Václav Neužil as Ctibor Novák
- Stefan Konarske as Captain Koller
- Saro Emirze as Commissioner Haneke
- Charles Lemming as Oberst Hoffmann
- Matěj Hádek as Zbyněk Roušar
- Karel Dobrý as STB Colonel
- Alžběta Malá as Hanka
- Petr Uhlík as Vladimir Hradec
- Daniela Kolářová as Grandma Ema
- Marián Mitaš as Josef Mašín (voiced by Pavel Řezníček)
- David Bowles as Captain Clark
- Adam Vacula as ensign Adam
- Fritz Fenne as Major Vopo

== Production ==
The film is based on the book Gauntlet by Barbara Mašín, Josef Mašín's daughter. The film is directed by Tomáš Mašín, a distant relative of the Mašín brothers. He started preparations for the film in 2010. Mašín struggled to find financing for the film but in 2019 he gained a foundation of 15 million Czech koruna from the Czech film fund. However, filming was further stalled due to the ongoing COVID-19 pandemic in the Czech Republic. The film also gained 1.5 million CZK from crowdfunding on the site Hithit.

In May 2022 filmmakers were choosing filming locations, worked on costumes and were casting supporting roles. Oskar Hes and Jan Nedbal were cast to play the two leading roles. Shooting started in early August 2022, and concluded on 6 December 2022. The first trailer for the film was released on 16 June 2023. The final trailer was released on 12 September 2023.

== Release ==
The film premiered in the Czech Republic on the 26th of October 2023, the 70th anniversary of the Mašín brothers' escape to West Germany. CinemArt distributed the film in the Czech Republic.

== See also ==
- List of submissions to the 96th Academy Awards for Best International Feature Film
- List of Czech submissions for the Academy Award for Best International Feature Film
