= General Neumann =

General Neumann may refer to:

- Bedřich Neumann (1891–1964), Czechoslovak Legions general
- Friedrich-Wilhelm Neumann (1889–1975), Wehrmacht lieutenant general
- Konstantin Neumann (1897–1937), Soviet Army komkor (predecessor rank to colonel general)
- Werner Neumann (officer) (1905–1970), Wehrmacht major general

== See also ==
- Walter Neumann-Silkow (1894–1941), Wehrmacht lieutenant general (promoted posthumously)
