= Mašín =

Mašín (Czech pronunciation: [ˈmaʃiːn]; feminine: Mašínová) is a Czech surname, derived from the given name Mašín, which is a pet form of Matěj, a variant of Matthew. Notable people with the surname include:

- Ctirad Mašín (1930–2011), Czech resistance fighter
- Jelena Mašínová (1941–2024), Czech screenwriter, editor and writer
- Josef Mašín (1896–1942), Czech general
- Josef Mašín (1932–2026), Czech resistance fighter
- Zuzana Mašínová (born 1979), Czech golfer

== See also ==
- Masin (disambiguation)
- Mashin
