= Milan Paumer =

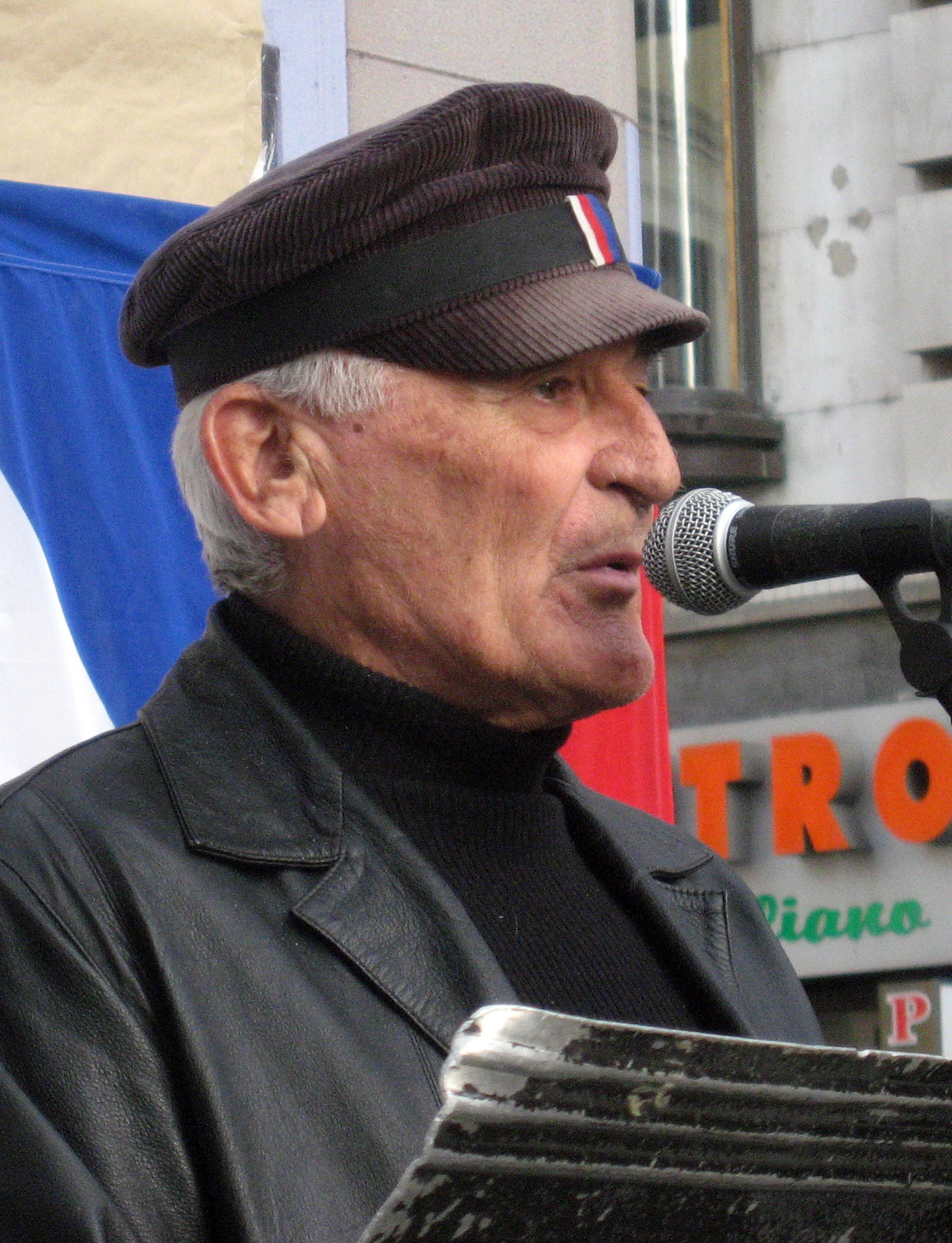
- Born: April 7, 1931; Kolín, Czechoslovakia
- Died: July 22, 2010 (aged 79); Prague, Czech Republic

Milan Paumer (April 7, 1931 – July 22, 2010) was a member of a militant Czechoslovak anticommunist resistance group that attracted worldwide fame – and notoriety – for killing seven men in the early 1952s in robberies of money and arms and for evading the biggest manhunt in the history of the Eastern Bloc. His five-man group, the Mašín Gang, carried out raids against state institutions in Czechoslovakia before being forced to flee to the West in October 1953. The group crossed the Czech border to East Germany, making their way to West Berlin while an estimated 25,000 East German policemen, soldiers and secret agents were searching for them. Two of their members were wounded in shootouts in which a total of four East German policemen were killed, but Paumer and the remaining two members of the Mašín Gang successfully made it to the West and ultimately to the United States.

After returning to the Czech Republic following the fall of Communism, Paumer retired to his old home town. He remained a controversial figure who was reviled by some as a murderer but hailed by others as a heroic resistance figure. He was honoured by the Czech government in 2008 and the Czech Prime Minister, Petr Nečas, declared that Paumer had made a heroic decision to fight Communist oppression.

== Early life and anticommunist beginnings ==
Paumer was born in Kolín in eastern Bohemia on 7 April 1931. During his childhood he lived in the nearby town of Poděbrady. It was there that he first met Ctirad and Josef Mašín, two brothers whose war hero father, a Czechoslovak general, was murdered by the Nazis during the Second World War.

In 1948, the Communist Party of Czechoslovakia seized power in a coup d'état and the Czechoslovak Socialist Republic was established. Paumer and the Mašín brothers decided to begin a campaign of armed resistance. They formed a group that became known as the "Mašín Gang" and began by carrying out minor acts of sabotage in the area around their home town, such as burning fields and defacing posters of Joseph Stalin. They decided to obtain weapons and in 1951 they raided two police stations, killing two policemen in the process. In a subsequent raid on a security van carrying a payroll to a manufacturing plant, the gang succeeded in stealing around a million Czechoslovak crowns but killed the van's cashier during the raid.

== Escape to the West ==
In October 1953 the five members of the Mašín Gang embarked on an escape to the West to avoid imminent arrest by the Communist authorities. Paumer had been drafted into the Czechoslovak military but was alerted by a coded message from the Mašíns telling him that "The wedding is next Saturday". They made their way across the border to East Germany but fell afoul of a railway ticket inspector, who reported his suspicions of the group to the police. An attempted ambush by the East German police ended in a shootout that left one policeman dead and resulted in one of the Czechs, Zbyněk Janata, being captured. The remaining four escaped from the scene and went on the run.

The East German authorities responded with a massive manhunt that was said to have involved up to 25,000 policemen, soldiers and Stasi secret agents. Paumer and his friends made their way across East Germany to West Berlin, living off the land, sleeping in the open in branch-covered holes and from time to time fighting off the police. During this time, three more East German policemen were killed in gun battles with the gang. Paumer himself was shot in the hip; although he suffered a painful injury, the wound did not immobilise him and he was able to continue with the escape. One of the other escapees, Václav Švéda, was not so lucky and was forced to surrender after being wounded.

At the time, the Berlin Wall had not yet been built and the inner German border was still relatively easy to cross around West Berlin. Paumer and the Mašín brothers made it to the outskirts of Berlin by hiding in the undercarriage of a train. On 2 November 1953, they reached the West by crawling along a ditch. Paumer later recalled:

"Finally we got to the beginning of Berlin. There was a street which what they did was cut it off, laid some wooden logs and barbed wire, and they dug a big ditch, which was about two metres deep. When we were in the ditch we were looking up to anxiously to get out. So I helped [Josef] and he helped pull me out. Then when we were finally on the street we saw a policeman. He took us to the station and then we were safe."

Their escape has been described by Czech-American author Jan Novak as the greatest story of the Cold War.

His colleagues Janata and Švéda, who had been captured earlier, were taken back to Czechoslovakia where they were executed in 1955. Ctibor Novak, the Mašíns' uncle, was also executed.

== After the escape ==
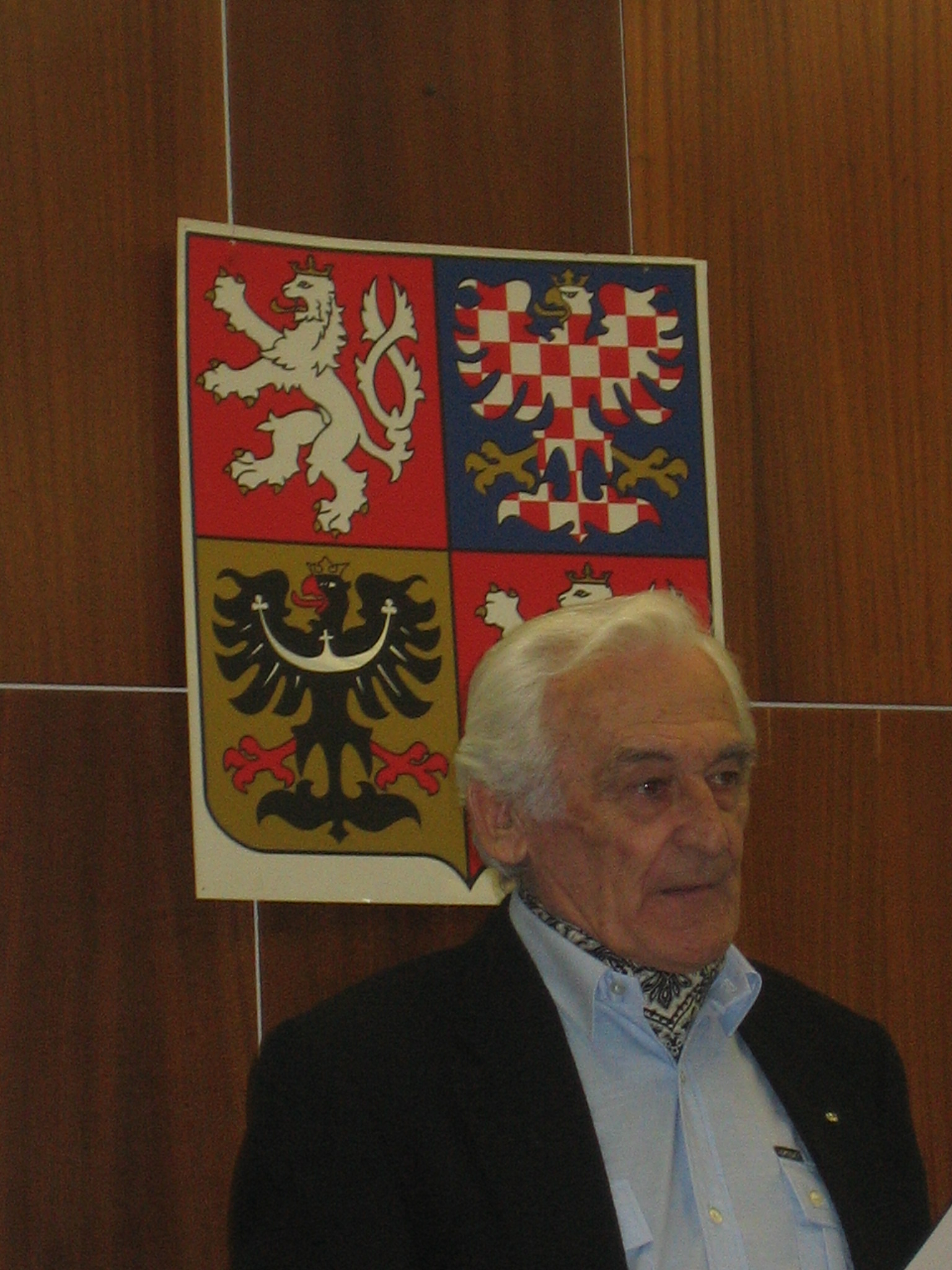
Milan Paumer

Paumer and the Mašíns claimed political asylum in the West after their escape and eventually managed to reach the United States. Paumer himself became a sergeant in the United States Army and served in South Korea. He worked in the aeronautical industry in Florida after leaving the Army and later ran a café. Following the Velvet Revolution of 1989, which ended Communist rule in Czechoslovakia, the outstanding warrants against Paumer and the Mašíns were quashed by the new government. Paumer returned to his native country and settled again at Poděbrady, where he retired in 2001. He remained active in politics and was a frequent attendant at anticommunist gatherings.

His story was documented in the 2006 book Gauntlet: five friends, 20,000 enemy troops, and the secret that could have changed the course of the Cold War by Barbara Mašín (ISBN 9781591145158).

== Controversy ==
Paumer's role in the killings of communist policemen and officials was and remains a controversial topic. He was praised as an anticommunist hero by some, but was regarded by others as a murderer who had killed without cause. He defended the killing of the policemen, saying that they had left him with no choice but to "do away" with them. He said that the payroll official had been killed after pulling a gun on the gang members and had been a member of the paramilitary People's Militia.

The controversy over Paumer's activities resulted in him being cold-shouldered for many years by members of the post-Communist Czech government. It was not until 2008 that he was officially recognized by the government, when the then Prime Minister Mirek Topolánek presented him with an award. The decision led to a major controversy; a poll commissioned by Czech Television found that nearly half the population regarded the Mašín Gang as criminals. The Czech Communist Party demanded that Paumer be stripped of his award and put on trial, while members of the left-wing Czech Social Democratic Party suggested that Paumer and his colleagues were "not good role models" for a time when the country was fighting terrorism. Historians and commentators noted that many Czech people are still ambiguous about the Communist past, particularly as Paumer and the Mašíns were virtually alone in forcibly resisting the regime of the Czechoslovak Socialist Republic. Nonetheless, Prime Minister Petr Nečas told mourners at Paumer's funeral in August 2010 that Paumer had made a heroic decision to fight communism and should not be judged from today's perspective; "as free people we have the right to fight against enslavement with any, truly any means."

== See also ==
- Mašín
