= Otakar Batlička =

Czech traveller and writer

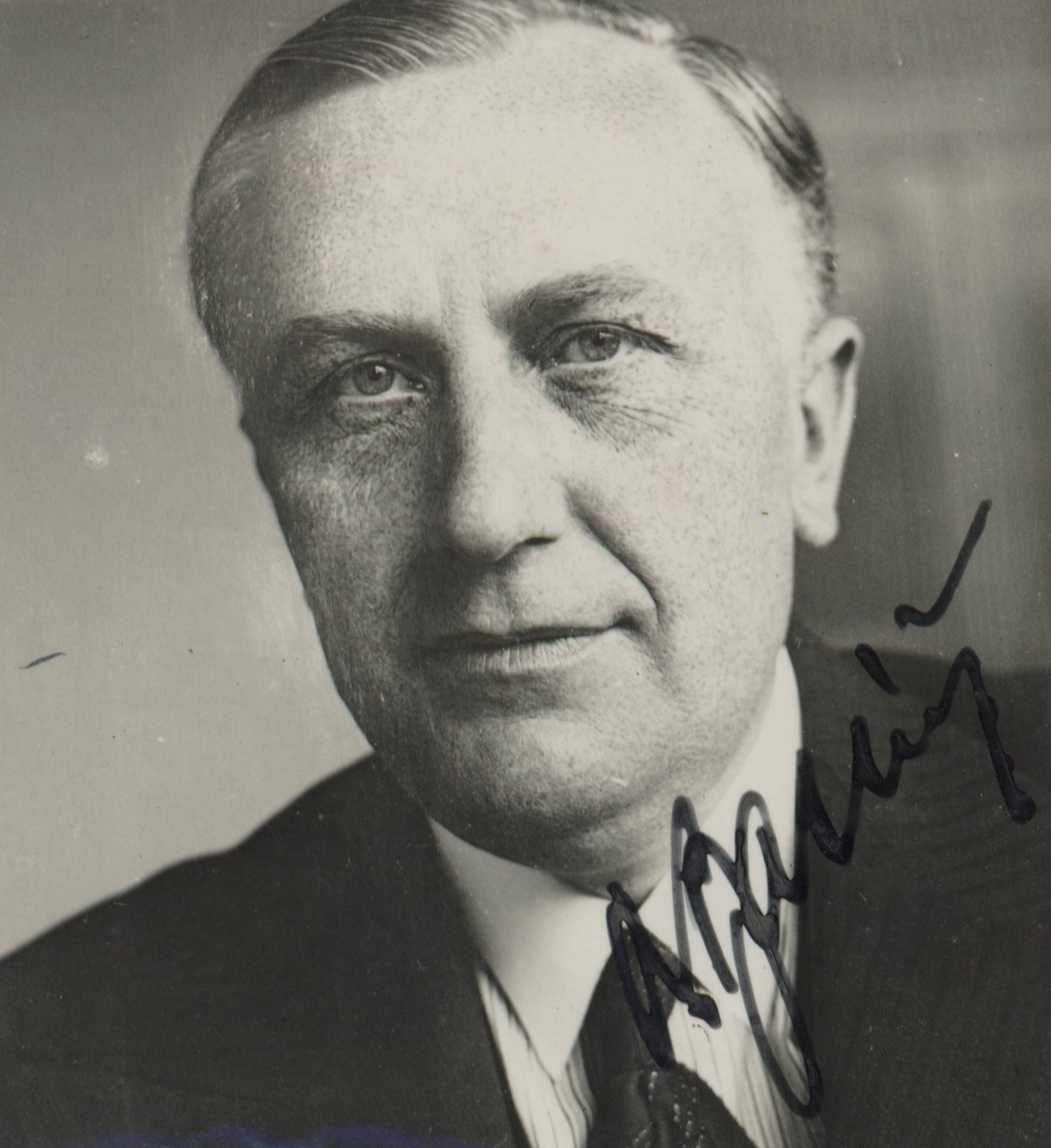
- Born: 12 March 1895; Vinohrady, Prague, Austria-Hungary
- Died: 13 February 1942 (aged 46); Mauthausen, Nazi Germany
- Known for: Writing and journalism
- Awards: Czechoslovak War Cross 1939–1945

Otakar Batlička (12 March 1895, Prague, Czech Republic (then part of the Kingdom of Bohemia in Austria-Hungary) – 13 February 1942, Mauthausen-Gusen concentration camp) was a Czech adventurer, journalist, ham (amateur) radio operator, and member of the Czech-based Nazi resistance group Obrana Národa during World War II.

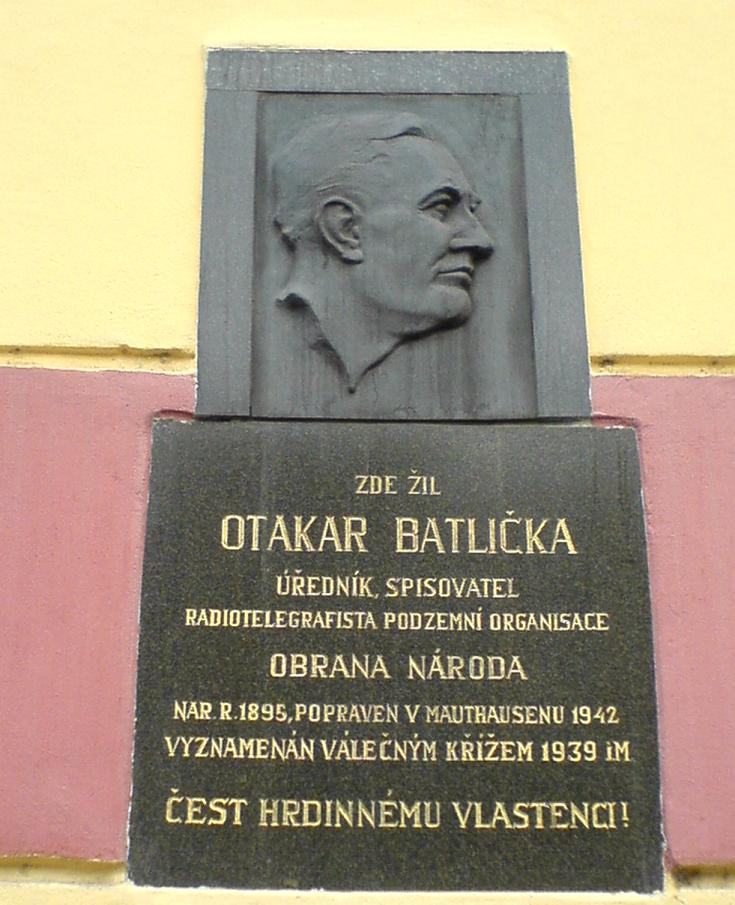
Plaque of Otakar Batlička

== Early life ==
Batlička was born in Vinohrady, Prague. In his early adult years, he traveled around the world, probably from 1914 to 1920. After his return to Prague, he was active in many areas: in the 1920s he took part in motorcycle races and experimented with electricity; in 1932 he registered as an amateur radio operator, and constructed his own transmitter which he presented at exhibitions and lectures, working for the Prague tram network.

== War years ==
After the Nazi occupation of Czechoslovakia and the subsequent establishment of the Protectorate of Bohemia and Moravia, he became a member of the Obrana Národa; as a radio operator he communicated with Moscow. At the same time, he started writing semi-autobiographical adventure stories for young people for the magazine Mladý hlasatel (English: Young Announcer), based on his travels. He wrote more than 150 stories. In his stories, he described his experiences, which he supplemented with stories of people he met.

== Death ==
He was arrested by the Gestapo on 14 October 1941, interrogated in the Petschek Palace, and transferred to the Theresienstadt concentration camp, eventually ending in the Mauthausen-Gusen concentration camp. He died there on 13 February 1942, probably being killed by Eduard Krebsbach. After the war, he was awarded the Czechoslovak War Cross 1939–1945 in memoriam.

His life and work has been promoted by the mystificator Petr Sadecký, the creator of Octobriana, who is responsible for the many myths surrounding Batlička.
