= Mashin (surname) =

Mashin (feminine Mashina) is a Russian surname (Russian: Машин, f. Машина). Notable people with the surname include:

- Natalia Mashina (born 1997), Russian footballer
- Olesya Mashina (born 1987), Russian footballer
- Pyotr Mashin (1851–1914), Russian Imperial Army cavalry general

== See also ==
- Mašín
