= Masin =

Masin may refer to:

== Places ==
- Kampong Masin, a Bruneian village
- Masin (island), an island in the Philippines
- Masin, Iran, an Iranian village
- Masin District, a Peruvian administrative subdivision
  - Masin, Peru, the capital of Masin District

== People ==
- Mašín, Czech surname
- Arnold Masin (born 1977), Polish politician
- Draga Mašin (1864–1903), Queen of Serbia
- George Masin (born 1947), American fencer
- Gwendolyn Masin (born 1977), Dutch violinist
- Lucila Masin (born 1984), Argentine politician
- Sandra Masin (born 1942), American politician
