= Třebichovice =

- Municipality
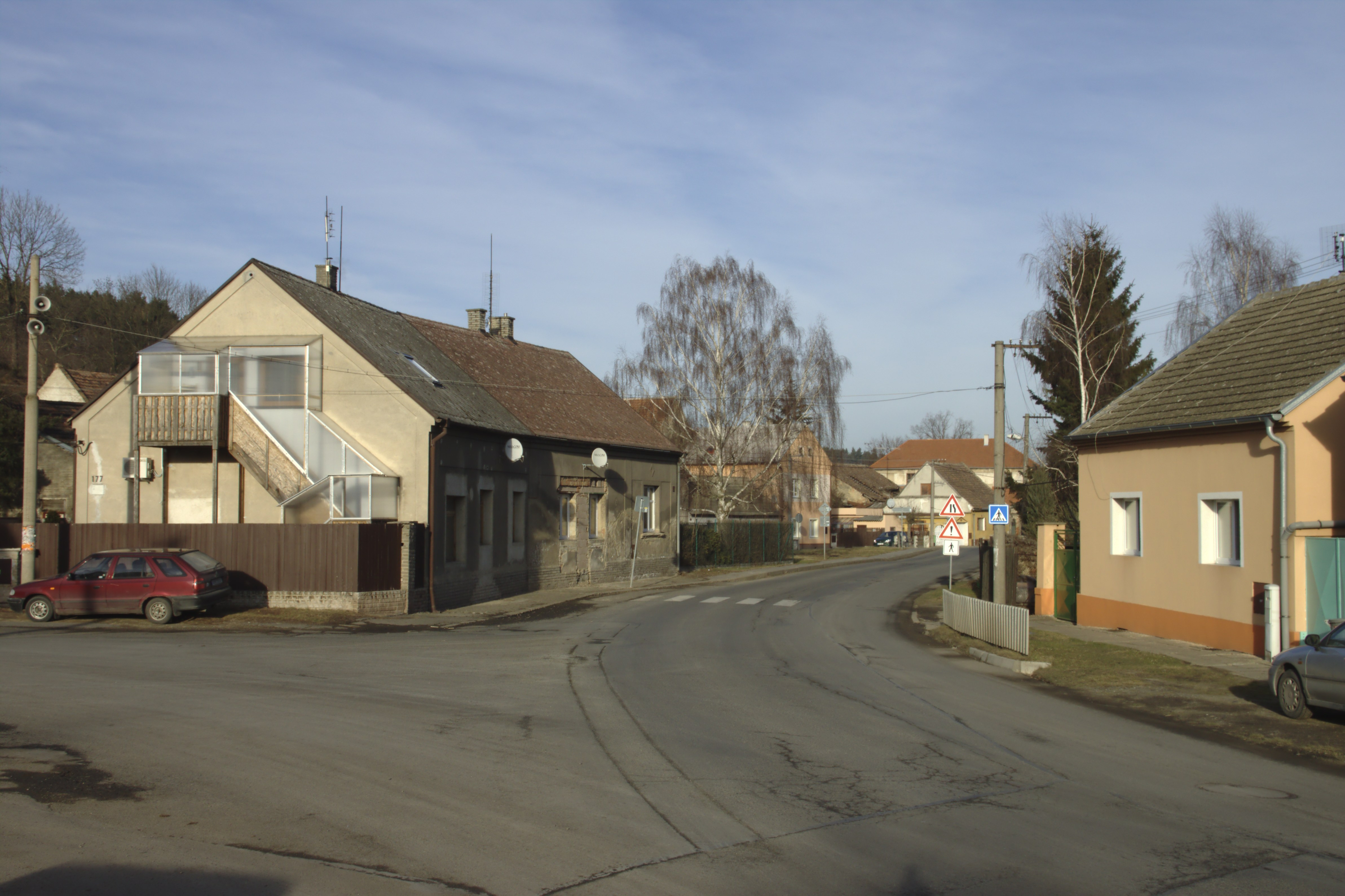
- Centre of Třebichovice

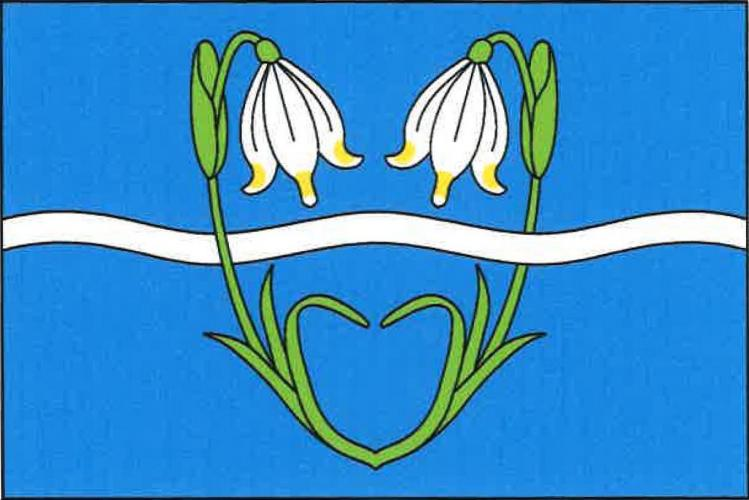
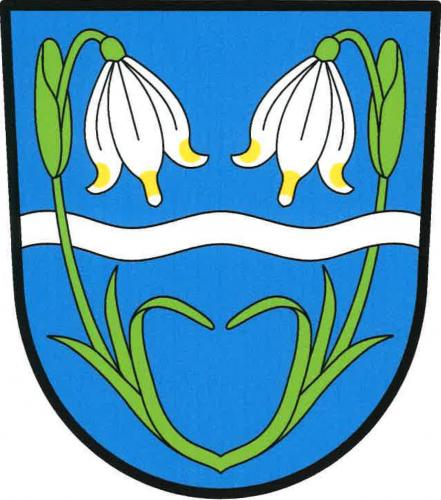
- Flag Coat of arms

- Location in the Czech Republic
- Coordinates: 50°11′26″N 14°4′45″E
- Country: Czech Republic
- Region: Central Bohemian
- District: Kladno
- First mentioned: 1324

Area
  - Total: 3.85 km^{2} (1.49 sq mi)
- Elevation: 260 m (850 ft)

Population (2026-01-01)
  - Total: 598
  - Density: 155/km^{2} (402/sq mi)
- Time zone: UTC+1 (CET)
  - Summer (DST): UTC+2 (CEST)
- Postal codes: 273 06, 273 08
- Website: www.trebichovice.cz

Třebichovice is a municipality and village in Kladno District in the Central Bohemian Region of the Czech Republic. It has about 600 inhabitants.

== Administrative division ==
Třebichovice consists of two municipal parts (in brackets population according to the 2021 census):

- Třebichovice (552)
- Saky (29)

== Demographics ==
Historical population
Year	Pop.	±%
1869	288	—
1880	351	+21.9%
1890	476	+35.6%
1900	863	+81.3%
1910	1,075	+24.6%
1921	945	−12.1%
1930	910	−3.7%
1950	784	−13.8%
1961	685	−12.6%
1970	598	−12.7%
1980	521	−12.9%
1991	463	−11.1%
2001	497	+7.3%
2011	516	+3.8%
2021	581	+12.6%
Source: Censuses

== Notable people ==
- Bedřich Neumann (1891–1964), general
