= Antonín Chráska =

Antonín Chráska (also Anton Chraska; 3 October 1868 – 15 March 1953) was a Czech Protestant missionary, translator and theologian.

== Biography ==
Chráska was born on 3 October 1868 in Horní Radechová, Bohemia, Austria-Hungary. Born into a family of weavers, Chráska decided to study theology at the age of 21. In 1897 he married and moved with his wife to Ljubljana, where he learned Slovene and began missionary work.

Chráska translated the Bible into Slovene for the British and Foreign Bible Society. The translation includes all the books of the Old and New Testaments, but not the Apocrypha. Published in 1914, the translation is entitled Sveto pismo Starega in Novega Zakona (The Bible of the Old and New Testaments).

Chráska lived with his family in Ljubljana until 1922, after which he returned to Czechoslovakia. He died on 15 March 1953 in Nové Město nad Metují, Czechoslovakia.
