= Václav Morávek =

Czech military leader and national hero

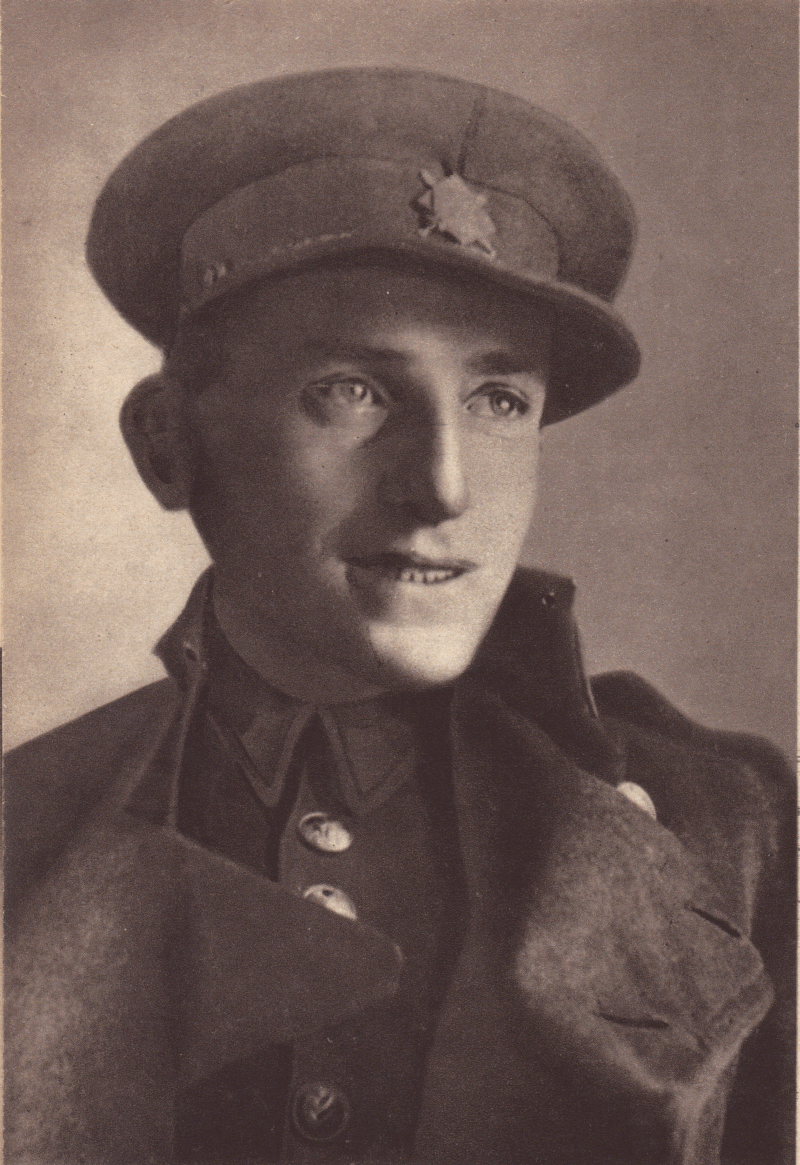
Morávek pre-WWII in Czechoslovak Army uniform

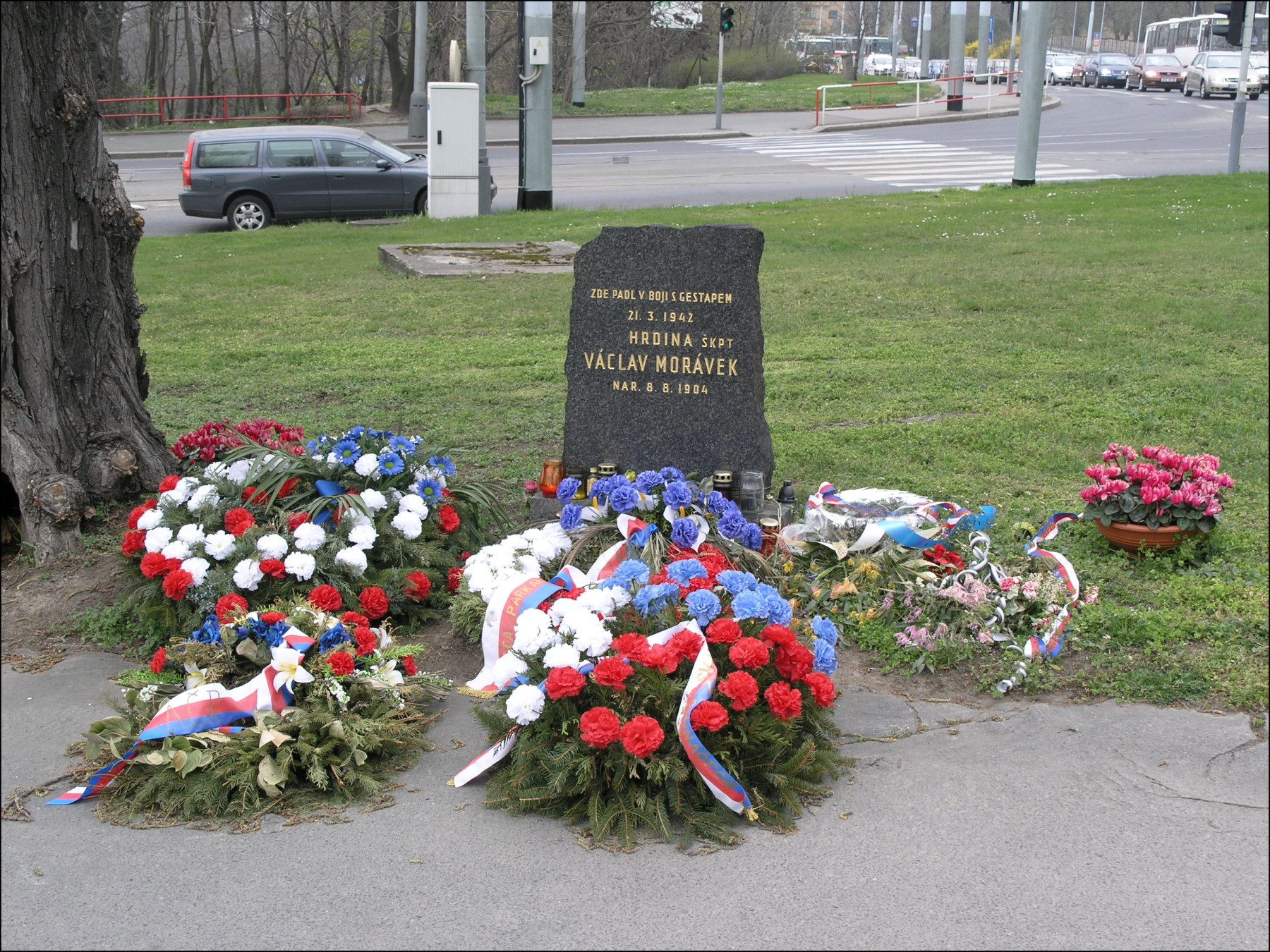
Memorial marking the place of Morávek's death

Václav Morávek (8 August 1904 – 21 March 1942) was a Czech military officer and war hero. He was one of the best-known personalities of the Czech anti-Nazi resistance and a member of the famous resistance group called the Three Kings.

== Life ==
Václav Morávek was born on 8 August 1904 in Kolín. He was a pistol shooting champion of the Czechoslovak Army (his personal motto during World War II is widely known: "I believe in God and in my pistols"), and commanded an artillery battery in Olomouc with the rank of staff captain during the first Czechoslovak Republic. Demobilised after the German occupation of Czechoslovakia, he worked as a clerk at the Labour Office in Kolín.

In summer 1939, he participated in the founding of the Obrana národa (lit. 'defense of the nation'), a resistance group made up of former Czechoslovak soldiers.

Morávek was, together with Josef Mašín and Josef Balabán, a member of a group whose main tasks were keeping in contact with Paul Thümmel (considered to be the most important Czechoslovak agent within the Nazi apparatus; codename A-54), maintaining radio connections with the London-based Czechoslovak Government-in-exile and sabotage. The trio was later nicknamed Three Kings (in Czech Tři králové).

Morávek was known for his foolhardy nature and daring actions. Among the most famous are his repeated personal colportage of illegal press to the Prague Gestapo office and his deliberate face-to-face meeting with Oskar Fleischer (who at that time headed a special Gestapo team that was hunting the Three Kings), which Morávek subsequently described in a detailed letter sent to Fleischer's superior. Once, when returning from Yugoslavia with explosives in his luggage, he was checked by a German policeman at Prague railway station - when asked, Morávek cold-bloodedly responded that "what may look like some explosives to you, are in fact ordinary sonds for centrifuges" and was allowed to leave.

The most visible sabotage operations carried out by the Three Kings were two bomb attacks in Berlin: one in January 1941 against the Ministry of Air Travel and police headquarters; and second, in the Berlin-Anhalt rail station next month, intended to kill Heinrich Himmler (whose train was unexpectedly delayed). In April and May 1941, respectively, Balabán and Mašín were arrested, but Morávek eluded capture for another ten months. He died on 21 March 1942 in a gunfight with agents of the Gestapo while he tried to help his colleague Václav Řehák, whom the Gestapo had arrested shortly beforehand. He is buried at the Ďáblice Cemetery in Prague.

On 8 May 2005, he was posthumously promoted to brigadier general.

== In popular culture ==
He is the protagonist in the Czech TV series Three Kings, inspired by his anti-Nazi resistance group.
