= Strašnice Crematorium =

Crematorium in Prague, Czech Republic

Crematorium Strašnice
- Krematorium Strašnice
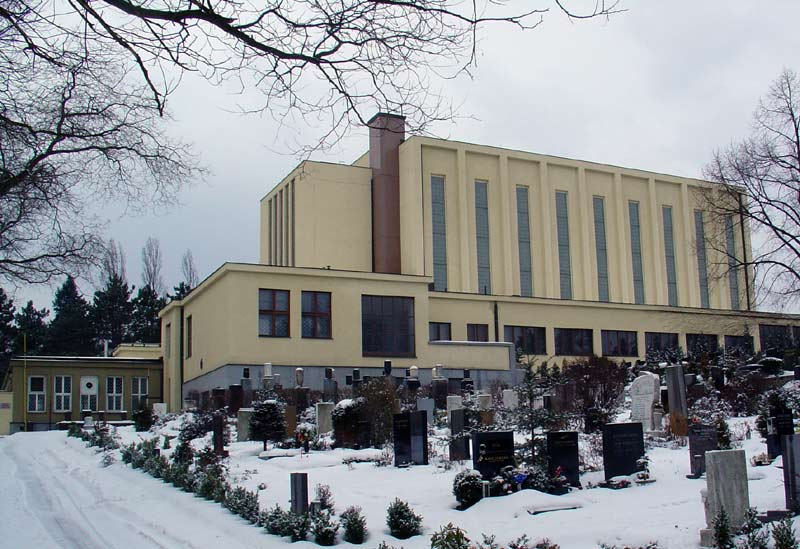
- Interactive map of the Crematorium Strašnice area

General information
- Type: Crematorium
- Location: Prague, Czech Republic
- Coordinates: 50.076456°N 14.484722°E
- Construction started: 1929
- Completed: 1931
- Owner: City of Prague, Czech Republic
- Operator: Pohřební ústav hl. m. Prahy

Design and construction
- Architect: Alois Mezera
- Main contractor: Tomáš Amena

Strašnice Crematorium (Czech: Krematorium Strašnice) is the largest crematory in Europe in terms of area. President Václav Havel was cremated here. The crematorium was involved in the disposal of those who had been executed by the Nazi and Communist regimes including writer Vladislav Vančura, general Josef Mašín, politician Milada Horáková and bishop Gorazd of Prague.

== Description ==
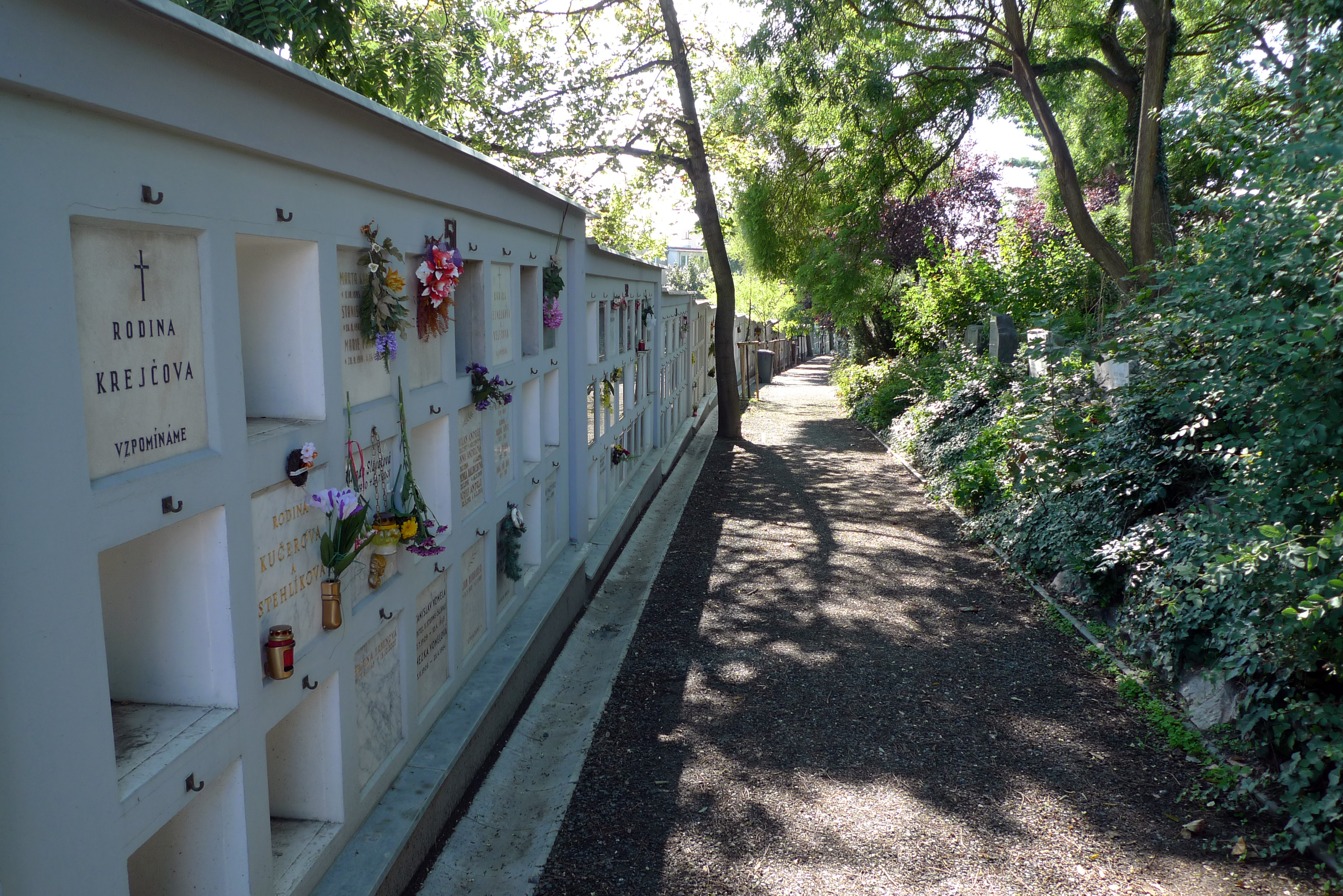
A columbarium at the crematorium

The crematorium was started in 1929 and it opened in 1932 in Prague-Vinohrady, Czechoslovakia (today the Czech Republic). In terms of area it is the largest crematorium in Europe. The main hall is sixteen metres high and covers an area of 450 square metres. The design brings in the hearses such that the journey into the building is down a gentle slope of three degrees. The ceremonial hall can accommodate 200 people but it has a large glass viewing area so that additional mourners can be accommodated outside. Music can either be recorded or the 100-square-metre (1,100 sq ft) hall can also use its own organ.

== Totalitarian regimes ==
During both the Nazi and communist era the crematorium was involved in the disposal of bodies resulting from executions and judicial killings. 2,200 decapitated people were said to have been cremated by the "night shift" during the Second World War. The bodies included Vladislav Vančura, General Josef Mašín and the martyr Bishop Gorazd.

After the war in 1948 the disposals started again with the remaining ashes destined to be added to compost. However some urns were kept although relatives were denied access to them. The crematorium was involved in the disposal of the body of Milada Horáková whose death was internationally condemned. The son of the crematorium's manager witnessed the disposal of bodies and this led to him joining the anti-communist resistance. He was sentenced to 25 years in jail in 1952.

== More recently ==
The crematorium has been listed as a cultural monument of the Czech Republic since 1988.

Former President Václav Havel was cremated here before his ashes were placed in the family vault in Vinohrady Cemetery nearby.

As part of the European Heritage Days initiative this building was opened to the public in September 2012.
