= Lošany =

- Municipality
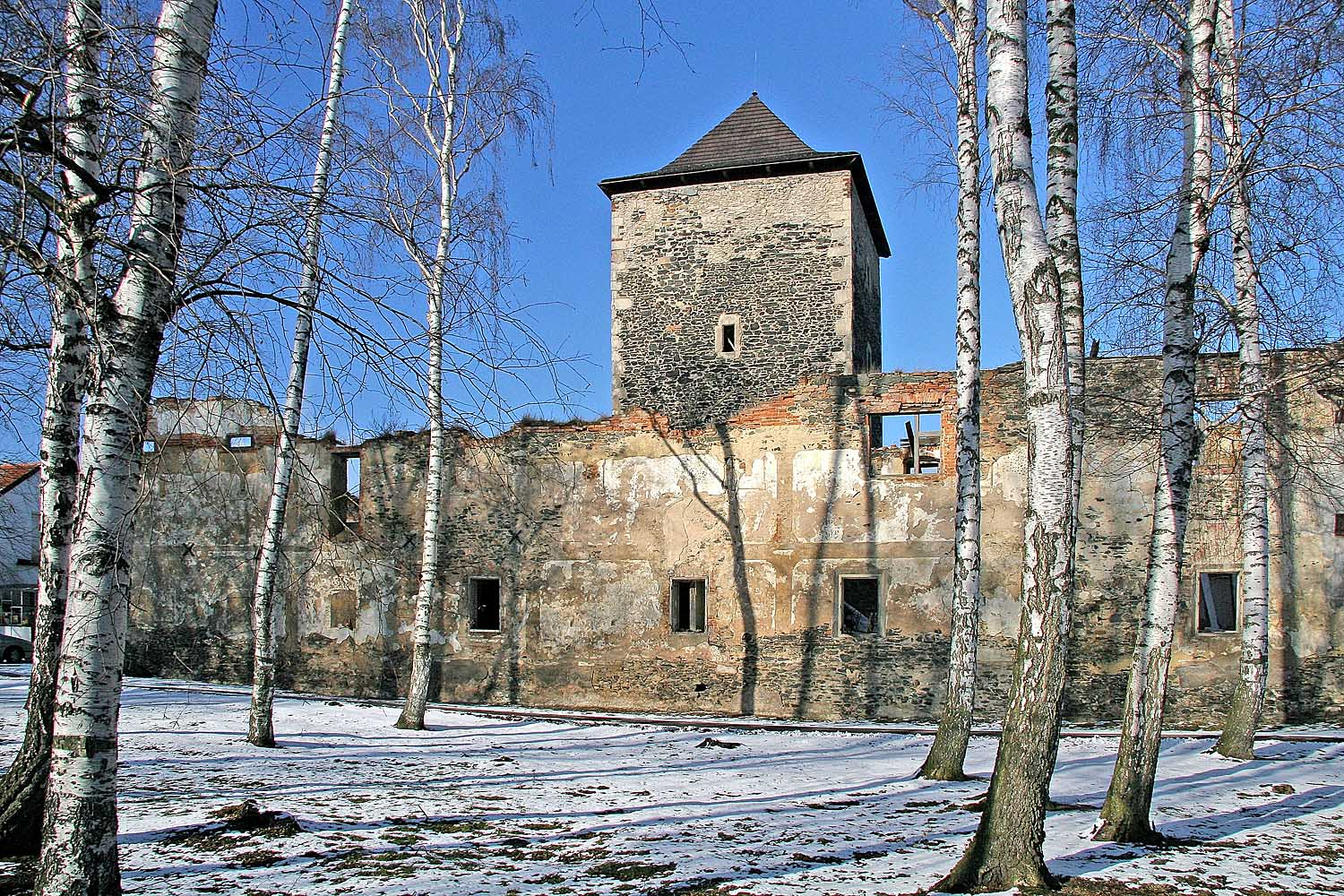
- Fortifications in Lošany

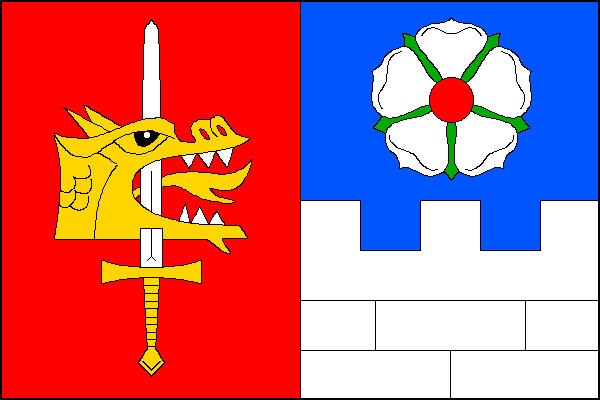
- Flag Coat of arms

- Location in the Czech Republic
- Coordinates: 49°59′41″N 15°7′34″E
- Country: Czech Republic
- Region: Central Bohemian
- District: Kolín
- First mentioned: 1259

Area
  - Total: 6.75 km^{2} (2.61 sq mi)
- Elevation: 312 m (1,024 ft)

Population (2026-01-01)
  - Total: 345
  - Density: 51.1/km^{2} (132/sq mi)
- Time zone: UTC+1 (CET)
  - Summer (DST): UTC+2 (CEST)
- Postal code: 280 02
- Website: www.losany.cz

Lošany is a municipality and village in Kolín District in the Central Bohemian Region of the Czech Republic. It has about 300 inhabitants.

== Administrative division ==
Lošany consists of two municipal parts (in brackets population according to the 2021 census):

- Lošany (206)
- Lošánky (112)

== Demographics ==
Historical population
Year	Pop.	±%
1869	547	—
1880	547	+0.0%
1890	587	+7.3%
1900	596	+1.5%
1910	615	+3.2%
1921	623	+1.3%
1930	582	−6.6%
1950	376	−35.4%
1961	386	+2.7%
1970	331	−14.2%
1980	325	−1.8%
1991	310	−4.6%
2001	277	−10.6%
2011	335	+20.9%
2021	318	−5.1%
Source: Censuses

== Notable people ==
- Josef Mašín (1896–1942), resistance fighter
