= Josef Balabán =

Czechoslovak soldier

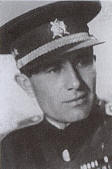
Josef Balabán

Major General i.m. Josef Balabán (4 June 1894 – 3 October 1941) was a Czechoslovak soldier known for his involvement in the resistance movement against Nazi Germany during World War II.

== Life ==
Balabán was born in Obora gamekeeper's lodge in Dobříš. During World War I, as a soldier in the Austro-Hungarian Army on the Eastern Front, he deserted in 1915, and after being interned, he joined the Czechoslovak Legions in Russia. Later, he served as an artillery officer in the Czechoslovak Army, then as a staff officer and at the Ministry of Defense (reaching the rank of lieutenant-colonel). After Germany occupied the remainder of Czech lands in March 1939, Balabán started to cooperate with the resistance group Obrana národa (Defense of the nation) that had been organized by former army officers. Beginning in the summer of 1939 he was one of the leaders of the organization. Together with Josef Mašín and Václav Morávek, Balabán was part of the group known as the Three Kings (Tři králové), which carried out intelligence gathering and sabotage.

The group continued in communication with Paul Thümmel (agent A-54), a Nazi intelligence officer also working as a spy for Czechoslovakia. The most visible acts of sabotage were two bomb attacks carried out in Berlin: one in January 1941 against the Ministry of Air Travel (Reichsluftfahrtministerium) and police headquarters, and the second in February 1941 in the Berlin-Anhalt rail station, which was intended to kill Heinrich Himmler.

On 22 April 1941 the Gestapo captured Balabán in Prague after a brief gunfight. In spite of being tortured he did not disclose any information about the resistance. After Reinhard Heydrich assumed the position of Deputy Reichsprotektor (September 1941), martial law was established and Balabán was sentenced to death. He was executed in Ruzyně Prison in Prague on 3 October.

== Literature ==
- Petr Koura: Podplukovník Josef Balabán. Život a smrt velitele legendární odbojové skupiny „Tři králové“ (Lieutenant-colonel Josef Balabán. Life and death of the leader of the legendary resistance group "Three Kings"), Prague, 2003, ISBN 80-86182-72-X.
