= Horní Radechová =

- Municipality
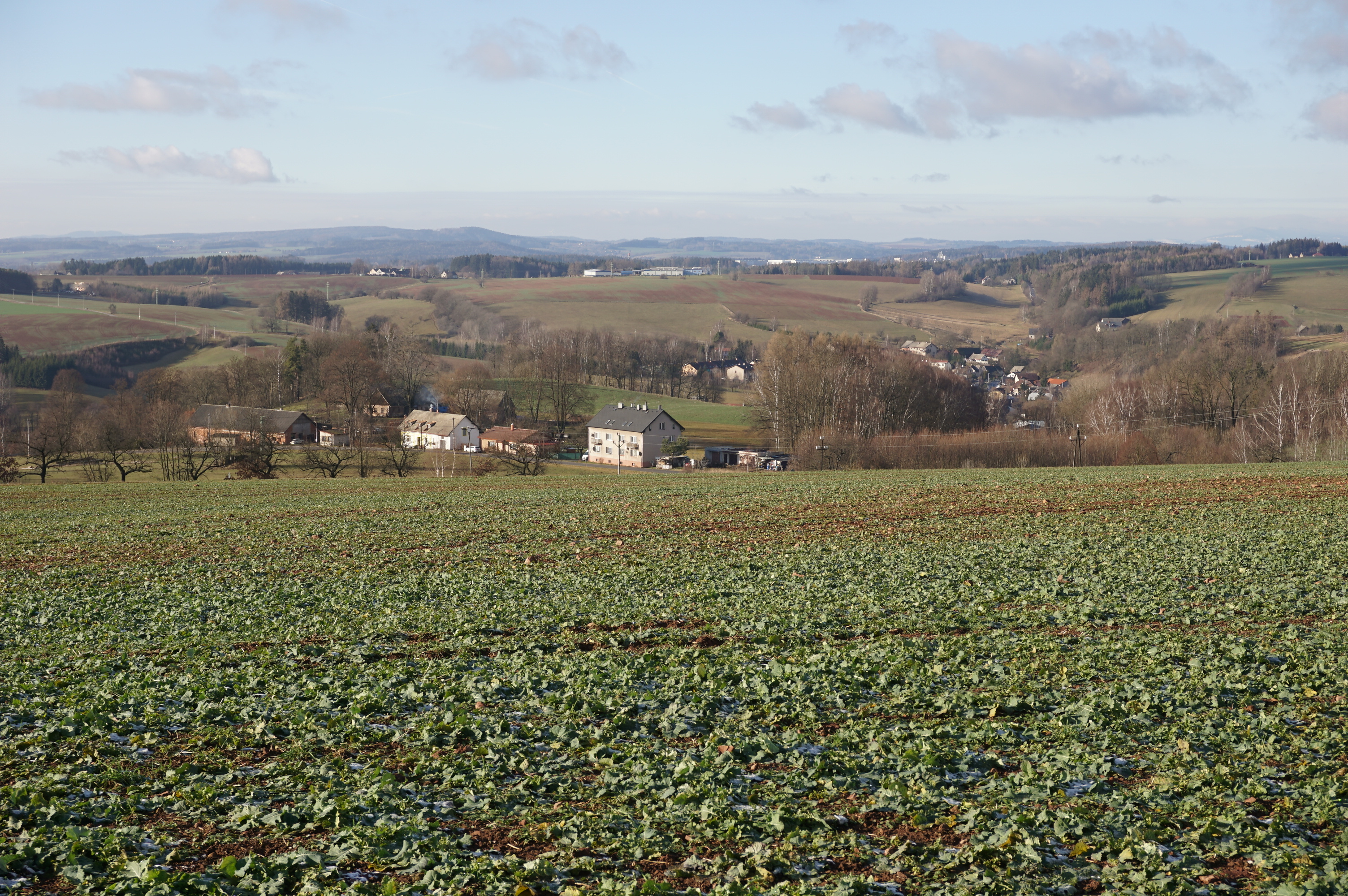
- Slavíkov, a part of Horní Radechová

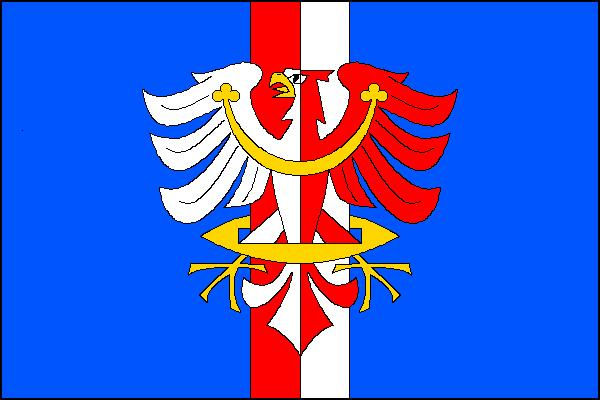
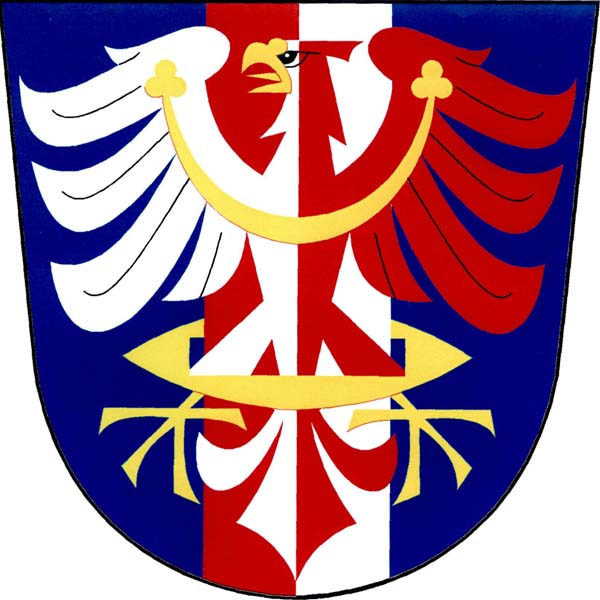
- Flag Coat of arms

- Location in the Czech Republic
- Coordinates: 50°28′3″N 16°8′41″E
- Country: Czech Republic
- Region: Hradec Králové
- District: Náchod
- First mentioned: 1402

Area
  - Total: 5.55 km^{2} (2.14 sq mi)
- Elevation: 416 m (1,365 ft)

Population (2026-01-01)
  - Total: 527
  - Density: 95.0/km^{2} (246/sq mi)
- Time zone: UTC+1 (CET)
  - Summer (DST): UTC+2 (CEST)
- Postal code: 549 46
- Website: www.obechr.com

Horní Radechová (German: Ober Radechau) is a municipality and village in Náchod District in the Hradec Králové Region of the Czech Republic. It has about 500 inhabitants.

== Administrative division ==
Horní Radechová consists of two municipal parts (in brackets population according to the 2021 census):

- Horní Radechová (429)
- Slavíkov (70)

== Demographics ==
Historical population
Year	Pop.	±%
1869	1,512	—
1880	1,303	−13.8%
1890	1,339	+2.8%
1900	1,245	−7.0%
1910	1,174	−5.7%
1921	1,239	+5.5%
1930	946	−23.6%
1950	822	−13.1%
1961	638	−22.4%
1970	528	−17.2%
1980	494	−6.4%
1991	434	−12.1%
2001	445	+2.5%
2011	495	+11.2%
2021	499	+0.8%
Source: Censuses

== Notable people ==
- Antonín Chráska (1868–1953), Protestant missionary, translator and theologian
