= Bedřich Neumann =

Czechoslovak general

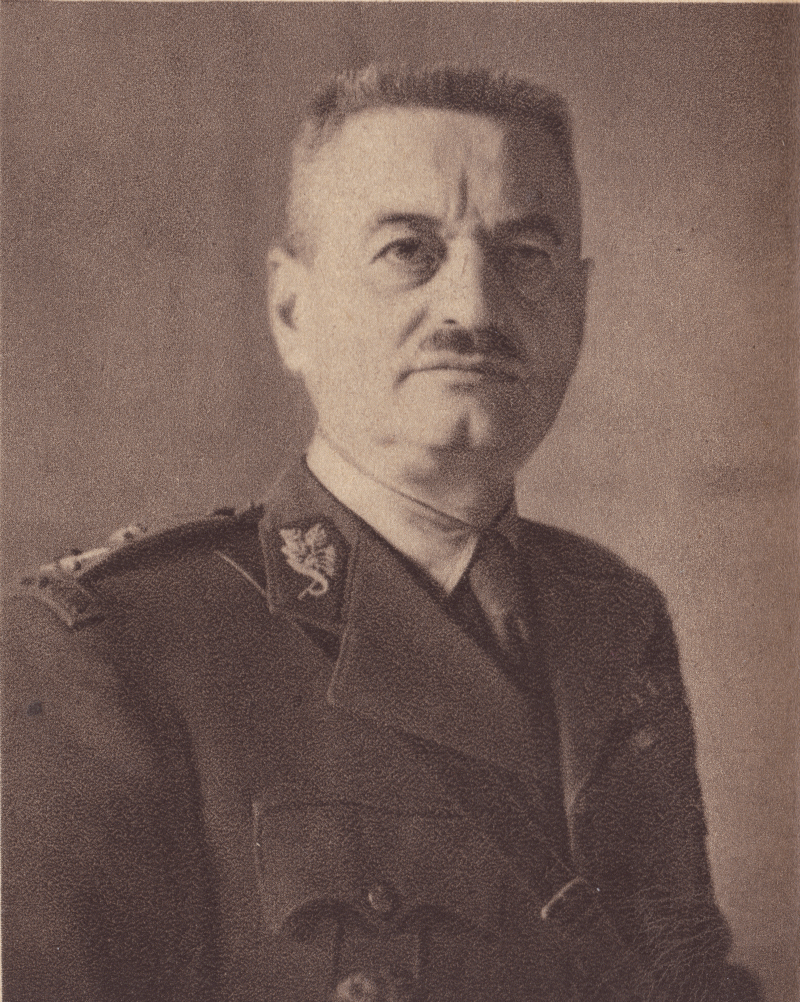

Bedřich Neumann (3 April 1891 – 15 July 1964) was a Czechoslovak general. He served in the World War I and in the Czechoslovak Legions in Russia, then in the World War II he became an important member of the Obrana národa resistance organisation and chief of staff to the Czechoslovak Army in exile, gaining the nicknames "Miroslav" and "Bohuš Miroslav" whilst in exile during that conflict. After the 1948 Communist coup in Czechoslovakia he became a political exile, dying in London sixteen years later.

== Life ==
Born in Třebichovice, he served in the World War I and then rose to the rank of Major in the Czechoslovak Legions in Russia, serving with them from 1916 to 1918. After returning to his homeland, which had become Czechoslovakia, he joined the new nation's army and held various command roles within it, culminating in that of Deputy Chief of the General Staff (1931–1935) and the rank of Brigadier General (1933). He was then put in command of 5th Division in České Budějovice (30 September 1935 – 1939).
