= Three Kings (Czech anti-Nazi resistance) =

World War II group (1939–1942)

Three Kings (Czech: Tři králové) as in reference to the biblical Three Wise Men was a Czech resistance group from 1939 to 1942. Its members were Josef Mašín (murdered by SS Einsatzgruppen on the orders of Reinhard Heydrich in 1942), Václav Morávek (killed in action in 1942), and Josef Balabán (executed in 1941).

The group was established in 1939 when Nazi Germany annexed Czechoslovakia. Their most important task was upholding radio contact with František Moravec in Great Britain.

== In popular culture ==
Seven part television series Three Kings was filmed and broadcast in 1998.

The group appears in 2017 film The Man with the Iron Heart.

Furthermore, the group is mentioned in the novel Prague Fatale written by the Scottish writer Philip Kerr and started in by the fictional detective Bernie Gunther.

The folk group "Epydemye" dedicated a song with the descriptive name "Tři králové" to the three kings as well.
