= Obrana národa =

Czech resistance organization in World War II

Obrana národa (ON; English: Defence of the Nation) was a Czech resistance organization that fought against the German occupation from 1939 to 1945. It opposed Nazi rule in the Protectorate of Bohemia and Moravia. The group was founded by General Josef Bílý in April 1939.

The Gestapo was able to seek out and destroy the group's leadership on three occasions (February 1940, May 1942 and June 1944), but each time the group was reorganized.

== Overview of activities ==
The formation of ON was the product of discussions among senior officers of the Army and Ministry of Defense that took place immediately after the Nazi occupation in March 1939. As early as March 19, some of the senior officers in the Czech army, including Gen. Sergej Ingr, Gen. Josef Bílý, and Gen. Sergei Wojciechowski, began talking about establishing a military resistance organization. At first, ON was relatively disorganized, but within a short time it had established itself in Bohemia and Moravia and had developed contacts in Slovakia. By the summer of 1939, the basic structure of the organization had fallen into place. The commanders were all former military officers, and the teams were recruited mostly from organizations such as Sokol (the Czech Gymnastics Association), Eagle (a Catholic athletics organization), and the State Defense Guard.

The original goal of fomenting an uprising against the Nazi occupiers power was soon abandoned as the ON became more focused on intelligence gathering and then on carrying out minor acts of sabotage. The ON had contact with the government-in-exile in London and was involved in helping people to leave the country.

Three officers, Lt. Col. Josef Mašín, Lt. Col. Josef Balabán, and Capt. Václav Morávek, who were known as the Three Kings, focused mainly on diversification activities and on acquiring weapons.

Counterespionage activity was under the control of František Hieke. Men working under Hieke monitored collaborators, arrests, and the movements of Gestapo agents.

During the Nazi occupation, many ON officers secured jobs at companies involved in strategic production, such as the Škoda factory in Plzeň. These positions enabled them to formulate estimates of German military potential, which were transmitted to London. Some information was obtained from other resistance groups, especially the Schmoranz group.

After the fall of Nazi Germany, ON hoped to serve as the Army of the restored Czechoslovakia and to maintain civil order until the return of political leaders from exile; but it proved difficult to secure the number of weapons necessary for these purposes.

=== Activities in Uherské Hradiště ===
In the Uherské Hradiště region, the local ON group was formed shortly after the occupation. The founding members included František Šlerka, František Hrabal, Jana Essender, Josef Stašek, and Vojtěch Šupka. The ON group in the Uherské Hradiště region was liquidated by the Gestapo in two waves, the first in 1940 and the second in April 1941. Among this ON group's activities were sabotage, weapons acquisition, and attempts at bacteriological attacks against the occupiers’ infrastructure.

=== Activities in Semily ===
The ON group in Semily was founded by František Hyška.

=== Iterations ===
==== First iteration ====
ON was established in secrecy. Between June 1939 and the end of the summer of that year, 200 battalions and command structures had been formed, and by August members ON had managed to penetrate the Gestapo. In two waves of arrest, the first in autumn of 1939 and the second in February 1940, the Gestapo effectively destroyed the group's leadership.

In two arrest waves (in the autumn of 1939 and in February 1940), the first iteration of ON was almost entirely neutralized. From some of the arrested officers, the Gestapo confiscated lists of commanders and units, resulting in further arrests. Arrested officers were interned in concentration camps. Some officers escaped, and either went underground or emigrated.

==== Second iteration ====
At first, leaders of the second iteration of the ON sought to re-establish it as an underground army, but as it became clear that the war would last longer than expected, they abandoned the idea of having a large, tightly structured organization. Instead, this second iteration of the group was more diffuse in its organization. They also gave up their original objective of fomenting a nationwide uprising and instead chose to focus on intelligence, sabotage, and related activities. There was also a problem attracting new members, as the brutality of the Nazi occupation had scared many people away from the idea of resistance.

In September 1941, Reinhard Heydrich was named Deputy Reich Protector of the Protectorate of Bohemia and Moravia, the parts of Czechoslovakia that had been incorporated into the Reich on March 15, 1939. In that same month of September 1941, Heydrich ordered a major strike against ON. Further strikes occurred in the months that followed, so that by early 1942 only a few ON members, notably Václav Morávek, remained at large. Heydrich died in June 1942 as a result of complications following an assassination attempt, and this triggered another round of ON arrests, which in effect destroyed the second iteration of the group.

==== Third iteration ====
In 1943–44, a military movement under the direction of Gen. Zdeněk Novák was formed, but this group was virtually destroyed in a June 1944 strike by German security forces.

==== Fourth iteration ====
After the capture of Novák by the Gestapo, Gen. František Slunečko took command of ON, creating the ALEX Group, which focused on collecting information. By this point, ON bore virtually no resemblance to its first iteration: it had no unified command or hierarchy, and its cells were only loosely associated with one another, a state of affairs which minimized the danger that a single arrest would lead to many others. At the end of the war, the remnants of ON participated in the May uprising.

=== Structure ===
The original structure of the ON was based on the prewar military hierarchy. Under the main headquarters in Prague were provincial headquarters in Bohemia, Prague, and Moravia, and under them, in turn, were regional headquarters in Pardubice, Louny, Plzeň, České Budějovice, Mladá Boleslav, Hradec Králové, Brno, Olomouc, and Moravská Ostrava. Some ON groups also existed at the level of political districts, larger cities, and neighborhoods of Prague.

Under Bílý, Ingr ran Moravia before going into exile; meanwhile, Brno was under the control of Wojciechowski. Bílý's Chief of Staff was Col. Čeněk Kudláček. Bohemia was under the command of Gen. Hugo Vojta, and Moravia, after Ingr's emigration, was under the command of Gen. Bohumil Všetička. Greater Prague was headed by Gen. Bedřich Homola.

==== List of leaders ====
- April 1939 – November 1940: General Josef Bílý
- November 1940 – December 1941: General Bedřich Homola
- January 1942 – June 1944: General Zdeněk Novák
- June – November 1944: Brigadier General František Bláha
- November 1944 – May 1945: General František Slunečko (ALEX headquarters)

==== Defense Staff ====
- Chief of Staff of the Central Command: Col. Čeněk Kudláček
- Deputy Chief of Central Command: Lt-Col. Václav Kropáček
  - I. department (organizational): Lt. Col. Frantisek Coufal, Maj. Bohumír Černohorský
  - II. Department (Intelligence): Maj. Jaroslav Hajicek, Col. Jaroslav Vedral
  - III. department (financial): Gen. Viktor Spěváček, Maj. František Raška
  - IV. department (material and supply): Col. Bruno Sklenovský
  - V. department (operational): Col. Josef Pták
  - Internal Radio Group and Special Commission: Lt. Col. Kropáček, Lt. Col. Coufal, Maj. Montenegrin

==== Notable members ====
- Josef Balabán
- Otakar Batlička
- František Binder
- Josef Churavý
- Josef Dostál
- Alois Eliáš
- Oldřich Fictum
- Bedřich Homola
- Bohuslav Kohout
- Karel Kutlvašr
- Vladimír Lederer
- Jaroslav Lisý
- Karel Lukas
- Karel Mareš
- Josef Mašín
- Václav Morávek
- Jaroslav Němec
- Bedřich Neumann
- Jan Obořil
- Jan Petera
- Bohumír Podlezl
- Tomáš Podruh
- Václav Šára
- Vasil Kaprálek Škrach
- František Slunečko
- Viktor Spěváček
- Oleg Svátek
- Otakar Sviták
- Ludvík Svoboda
- Jaroslav Vedral
- Hugo Vojta
- Bohuslav Všetička
