= Jan Novák (writer) =

Czech-American writer, screenwriter and playwright (born 1953)

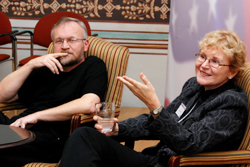
Jan Novák and sister Vladimira Papirnik in 2009

Jan Novák (born April 4, 1953, in Kolín) is a Czech-American writer, screenwriter and playwright. He writes in both Czech and English, occasionally translating his work. He has received awards in both the United States and the Czech Republic. He has worked closely with such figures as Václav Havel and Miloš Forman.

== Early life and education ==
His family fled Czechoslovakia in 1969, after his father was discovered to have committed embezzlement. They escaped to a refugee camp in Austria, where after corresponding with members of the large Czech-American community in Chicago, they were able to emigrate to Cicero, Illinois. After high school, he initially attended Shimer College, a small Great Books college then located in Mount Carroll. He subsequently attended and graduated from the University of Chicago, receiving bachelor's and master's degrees. In 2008, he returned to his native Czech Republic and has been writing in Czech since 2009.

== Literary career ==
Novák's first published story was the winning entry in a short-story contest by the University of Chicago Maroon, which he originally wrote in Czech and then translated into English. The story caught the attention of Czech-American publisher Josef Škvorecký, who published Novák's debut collection of short stories, Striptease Chicago (ISBN 0887811299). The stories in the collection depict the lives of Czech immigrants in America with an ironic sensibility. The stories also showed a propensity for Czenglish, a mixing of the Czech and English languages. His other works in this period were written solely in English.

His 1985 novel The Willys Dream Kit, (ISBN 0151967660 ) draws on family experience and depicts his father's life story from his youth during the Nazi occupation to death in the USA. It was very favorably received, winning the Carl Sandburg Award for Chicago authors and the Friends of Literature Award. The foreword to the Czech edition was written by Václav Havel. His second novel The Grand Life (Poseidon Press, 1987), again partly inspired by his own experiences (the hero is a middle manager at a Chicago telephone company), was also favorably received, but not a commercial success.

Venturing into nonfiction, he wrote Commies, Crooks, Gypsies, Spooks and Poets (1995). It's his "adventure in the border zone of genres", recounting a year he spent in Prague in 1992–3, where he moved to teach his grade-school children Czech. It received the Carl Sandburg Literary Award for non-fiction in 1995.

Novák's So Far So Good, an extensive literary treatment of the story of the Mašín brothers who escaped to West Berlin in 1953, was originally written in English but was first published translated into Czech as "Zatím dobrý". It won the Magnesia Litera award for book of the year in 2005. In 2018, it was finally published in English by Slavica Press. In 2007, he wrote another novel, "Grandpa", which was only published in a Czech translation (Děda) (Bookman, ISBN 978-80-903455-6-0), but was awarded the Josef Škvorecký Prize.

Switching to Czech in 2009, he published a book of interviews with prominent Czech-Americans, titled On the Other Side of the Pond (Franz Kafka Publishing House), examining the life stories of Miloš Forman, Dominik Hašek, Lubomír Kaválek, Antonín Kratochvíl, Milan Sova and Josef Mašín. (ISBN 978-80-86911-25-00)In 2011 in Czech, he published another novel, "Alaska or the story of a story" (ISBN 978-80-259-0067-3). An extensive interview with John Bok, "A Life Beyond Category" was published in 2015 (ISBN 978-80-257-1431-7). In 2020 Novak wrote a voluminous biography of Milan Kundera, "Kundera, His Czech Life and Times", causing a literary scandal in the Czech letters (ISBN 978-80-257-3215-1). In 2022, Novak published "Underpaid, but Armed", an autobiographical report on his three year stint as an armored carrier in Chicago at the beginning of the century (ISBN 978-80-257-3897-9). Novak is also a co-author with Lubomir Kavalek of his memoir "Life at Play", which came out in 2023 and received the Egon Ervin Kisch Award (ISBN 978-80-257-4107-8). As of 2022, the renown Prague publishing house Argo has been publishing Novak's Collected Works.

== Film career ==
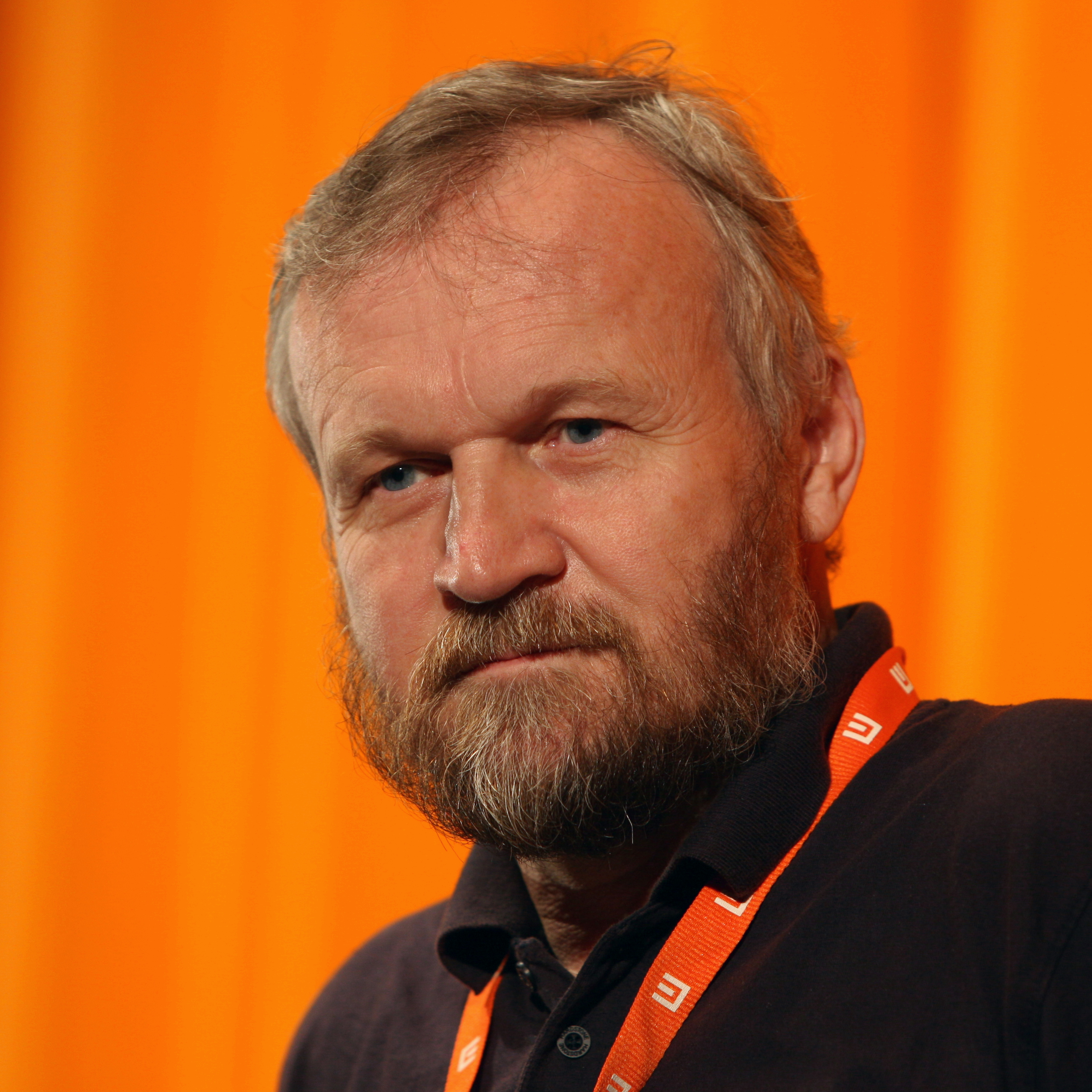
Jan Novák at 44th Karlovy Vary International Film Festival

As a screenwriter, Novák worked with Miloš Forman on the film Valmont. He is also co-author of Forman's autobiography called "Turnaround" (Villard Books 1994 (ISBN 978-0-679-40063-9), which was translated into 22 languages. The Czech version, called "What Do I Know?" was translated by Jiri Josek (Atlantis 1994, ISBN 80-7108-076-4).He wrote the script for the Czech film Báječná léta pod psa ("The Wonderful Years That Sucked"), which topped the Czech box office in 1997. He co-wrote the screenplay for "Nejasná zpráva o konci světa" An ambiguous report about the end of the world, directed by Juraj Jakubisko. Novak is the screenwriter of "Nedodržaný sľub" ("Broken Promise"), based on a true story of a Jewish boy who survived the Holocaust by playing soccer brilliantly, which was nominated for the foreign Oscar by Slovakia in 2009.

He has made two documentary films about Václav Havel, together with his son Adam. In 2005 they shot the documentary "Občan Havel jede na dovolenou", (Citizen Václav Havel Goes on Vacation), recounting a vacation taken by the dissident Havel in 1985 who was followed by some 300 secret police agents in the course of a week, though they also showed Havel the way to his next destination when he got lost. This was followed in 2009 by the film "Občan Havel přikuluje", (Citizen Havel is Rolling the Empty Barrels), a report on the creation and context of Havel's one-act play "Audience", which received a nomination for the Czech Lion Award. Novak and his son also shot a documentary comedy, entitled "Pušky, puky, pivo a psi", ("Guns, Pucks, Beer and Dogs"), recounting the follies of the best ice hockey players drafted into the Czechoslovak army. In 2023, with Martin Froyda, Novak documented the Masin brothers' story in a feature, called "Útěk do Berlína", ("Escape to Berlin").

In 2009, for one semester, he taught screenwriting at the Film and TV School of the Academy of Performing Arts in Prague.

== Playwriting career ==
Novák's first play was "Bohemian Heaven," which opened at the Provincetown Playhouse in 1980; it paints a satirical portrait of a newly arrived Czech immigrant family in Cicero, Illinois.

His play "Alaska," originally commissioned for Chicago's Goodman Theater, was performed in Brno in 1994. In 2000, the Astorka theater in Bratislava, Slovakia, produced his "Vražda sekerou ve Sv. Petěrburgu", ("An Ax Murder in St. Petersburg)," a dramatic adaptation of the ax murder in Fyodor Dostoevsky's Crime and Punishment and kept it in its repertory for the next ten years. In. In 2009, the Astorka theater produced Novak's play "Tolstoj a peníze", ("Tolstoy and Money") and played it in repertory for eight years.

Novák also translated into English Václav Havel's play Audience, Unveiling, Protest and The Garden Party (alternatively titled Office Party). These were performed widely around the US and Canada. His one-act plays were published in 2009 in a bilingual edition under the title "Citizen Vanek / Vanek Citizen ". They were published in the U. S. in 2012 by Theater 61 Press under the title "The Vanek Plays", which edition also included Novák's translation of Havel's modern Vanek sequel, Dozens of Cousins.

== Graphic Novels ==
Beginning in 2016, Novak became a librettist for graphic novels. With the Czech artist Jaromirem 99 drawing the pictures, they published "Zátopek", a biography of the legendary Czechoslovak long-distance runner, which was subsequently published in 10 languages and remains one of the most popular comic books in the Czech Republic. In 2018, they produced a comic-book version of "Zatím dobrý" ("So Far, So Good") and in 2020 "Čáslavská", a comic book biography of the winner of seven Olympic gold medals in gymnastics who ended up a cleaning lady under the neo-Stalinist regime in the Czechoslovakia of 1970's.
