= Josef and Ctirad Mašín =

Czechoslovak resistance fighters

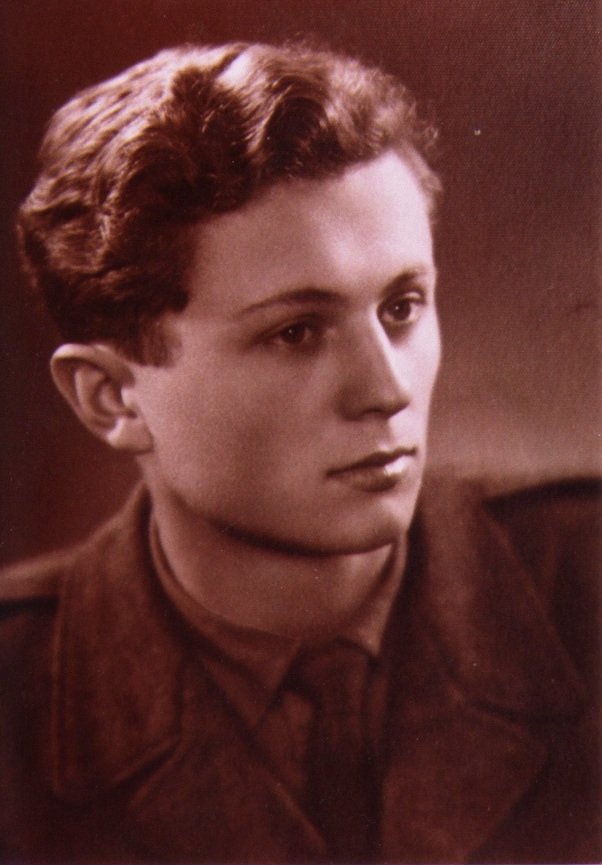
Ctirad Mašín

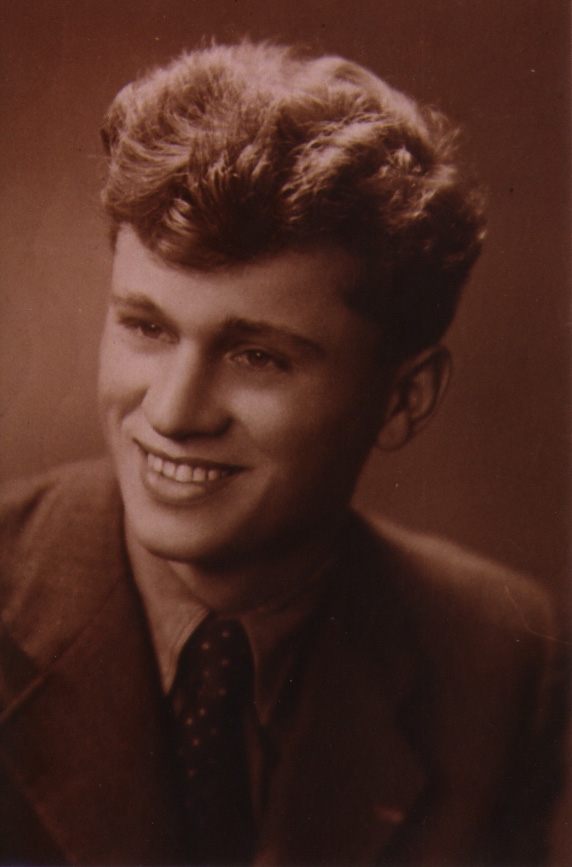
Josef Mašín

Ctirad Mašín (August 11, 1930 – August 13, 2011) and Josef Mašín (March 8, 1932 – November 2, 2026) were Czechoslovak brothers who put up armed resistance against the communist regime in Czechoslovakia during the period 1951–1953. Their father was general Josef Mašín.

== The resistance group and its actions ==
Following World War II, Mašín's sons, who were both born in Prague, attended a high school in Poděbrady. After the Communists seized power, they witnessed how some of their family's friends—opponents of the regime—were silenced, vanished without a trace or were sentenced to death in public show trials. For instance Milada Horáková, a famous early judicial murder victim, had been a friend of their mother. Both ladies spent time in Nazi Theresienstadt concentration camp during WWII. The Mašíns shared the idea that the Americans, who had helped to establish Czechoslovakia, would soon come and "wipe out Communism". The radio stations "Radio Free Europe" (RFE) and "Voice of America" (VOA) seemed to promise an imminent invasion. Therefore, they formed a military resistance group with a few friends. The Mašín brothers' uncle Ctibor Novák, a former Secret Service Officer, became an adviser of the group. One source says that Novák had actually put up with the fact of Communist rule and was satisfied if the Communists did not bother him. He engaged in the group mainly because he hoped he could control his hot-tempered nephews and prevent them from doing the most dangerous actions. But that was just his defense strategy when he was on trial in 1954. Indeed, he was very supportive and encouraged the brothers' actions. The brothers and Novák were the only ones in the whole "no-name group" who knew all other members by name.

The following actions of the group are documented:

In 1951 the group raided two police stations in order to get weapons and ammunition. In both cases one policeman was killed (one of them previously chloroformed and handcuffed).

Since it was becoming increasingly difficult to conduct actions, the brothers decided to go West. Their goal was to get some real training in partisan warfare techniques from the Americans. They believed a shooting war was imminent, and they wanted to return to Czechoslovakia in the vanguard of the "liberating" western armies. A first escape attempt failed when a CIC agent who was supposed to accompany them was arrested by the Czechoslovak Secret Service StB. During interrogation, he named Ctirad Mašín. Shortly thereafter, both brothers and Novák were arrested by the StB and were tortured. The StB never found out that they had seized the men responsible for the police station raids. Josef Mašín and his uncle were released after a few months.

Ctirad Mašín was sentenced to two years of forced labor for knowing about someone else's planned escape but failing to denounce them, and was sent to work in a uranium mine near Jáchymov, noted for its high death rate. Mašín stated that his time in the Czechoslovak equivalent of the Gulag made him even more determined to fight the regime.

During Ctirad Mašín's imprisonment the others attacked a payroll transport and obtained 846,000 Czechoslovak crowns. One of the car's occupants raised his pistol against Josef Mašín and was shot by him.

After Ctirad Mašín's release, the group stole four chests totaling 100 kg of donarit explosives from a quarry. They planned to blow up a uranium train with these explosives, or possibly President Klement Gottwald's personal train.

The last action before their escape was the "Night of Great Fires". In several Moravian villages Václav Švéda and Ctirad Mašín placed incendiary composition with time fuses into straw stacks. They all lit up in the middle of the night. The action was a protest against the Socialist collectivization of agriculture. At that time, even straw was in short supply, so the Mašíns' intention was not only spreading "shock and awe" but really harming the economy of the agricultural collectives. A firefighter was gunned down. While one source states he died with one bullet in his eye and one in his lungs, most others mention only three casualties in Czechoslovakia which means he must have survived.

== Through the curtain ==
Luckau-Uckro station

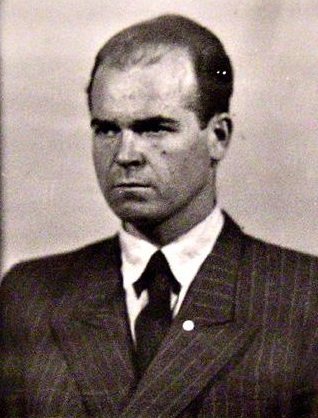
Václav Švéda

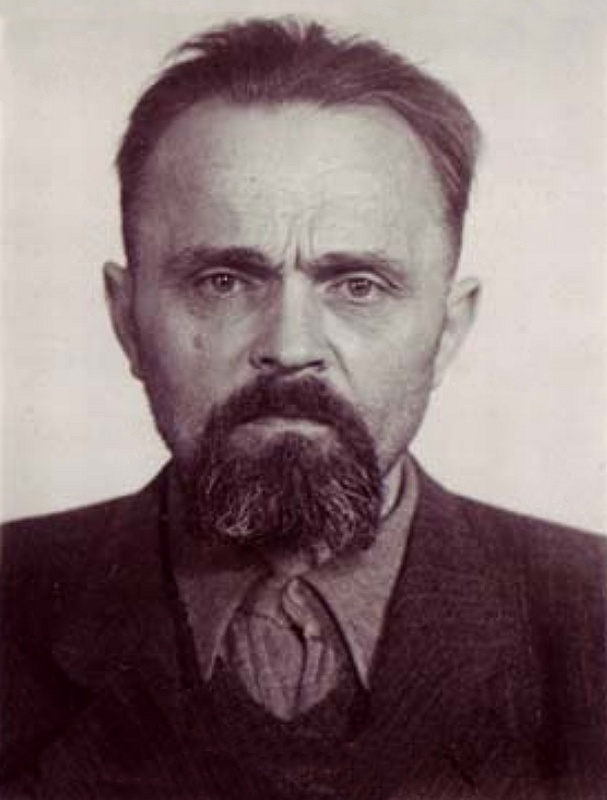
Ctibor Novák

In October, 1953 the group made a second attempt to escape to the West. Radio Free Europe broadcasts made it sound like World War III was imminent, and the Mašíns and their friends wanted to take part in the invasion. They claimed that the police still had no leads on their actions, therefore the danger of being arrested was not a reason for their escape. In the night from the 3rd to the 4th of October Zbyněk Janata, Václav Švéda, Milan Paumer and the Mašín brothers crossed the border to East Germany near Hora Svaté Kateřiny (Deutschkatharinenberg) in order to get to the western part of Berlin.

West Berlin was the last gap in the Iron Curtain. The Berlin Wall had not yet been erected, and numerous streets and footpathes, trams and suburban trains connected the parts of the divided city. The border guards could not manage to check the identity of every passenger. So there was a chance for the five to reach their destination without being discovered, especially because their names and their activities were not yet known to the East German police. After three days of walking through the cold they tried to hijack a car. The attempt failed, but now the police started searching for "five armed foreigners". The fugitives made another mistake taking a train which they thought would bring them closer to Berlin. But on the train they misunderstood an announcement that the train would go back to where they had started from.

The next time they took a train ended in a disaster: the women who sold the tickets informed the police about some "suspicious foreigners". At Uckro station (today: Luckau-Uckro) the police waited for the train and checked the passengers. When challenged, the group started shooting, killing two policemen and injuring one. The policeman in charge, hit by 6 bullets, quit his job when the head of the East German police (Volkspolizei) held him responsible for the Mašín brothers finally escaping to the West.

Shortly after that incident Zbyněk Janata, separated from the others, was caught. Only after interrogating him and consulting the Czechoslovak authorities did the East German police know who they were dealing with. Now the biggest manhunt of the Volkspolizei started. After finding and losing the track of the refugees several times, more and more troops were ordered to support the manhunt. East Germany did not have an army at that time. There was only a predecessor of the East German Army, the so-called "Kasernierte Volkspolizei" (Barracked People's Police). Those troops and eventually even Soviet Red Army troops based in the GDR were asked for assistance.

Eventually thousands of people hunted the four anti-Communists. Right after their arrival in West Berlin, western newspapers wrote of "20,000 Vopos" (Vopo stands for "Volkspolizei officer"). Wolfgang Mittmann (1939–2006), a true crime author and former member of the Volkspolizei stated that according to the final report there were only 5,000 policemen involved in the manhunt, plus troops of the Secret Service plus troops of the Red Army. Their number does not appear in the police files. Barbara Mašín assumes that the number of 5,000 was a first attempt by East German officialdom to minimize the manhunt and the scope of the humiliation.

Altogether three pursuers were shot by the group. At least three more bystanders died in friendly fire.

At Waldow, about 100 kilometres (62 mi) from Berlin, the group was encircled. They waited for the night and then managed to run through the encirclement. Killing two Volkspolizei officers in the process. The next day Václav Švéda, hurt by a stray bullet, surrendered and was eventually found by the police. He was executed in Czechoslovakia in 1955.

Several times the police were called because of rumours that someone had seen the Czechs. Many of the troops were inexperienced young men who had joined the armed forces only weeks or months before. They did not get any official information from their officers, and therefore rumours spread in which the Czechs were depicted as savages who had killed countless pursuers. Therefore, the troops, whenever assuming the fugitives were near, shot at "anything and everything that moved" and afterwards wrote into their reports that they had fired at the Czechs but missed. As a result, one can find gun battles at places that the fugitives never passed near in the police files. Moreover, the Mašíns, after arriving in the West, consciously changed some details of their story in order to protect people who had helped them. For instance they claimed they had crossed the autobahn between Berlin and Dresden after the Waldow battle and found refuge with a family in "Schönwalde". Though later there were people in Schönwalde who "remembered" the Mašíns' visit, several researchers found out that they never made it there: the highway was under permanent surveillance; passing it was simply impossible.

On 2 November 1953, the Mašíns and Paumer reached their destination: Ctirad Mašín under the floor of a suburban train, Milan Paumer and Josef Mašín somehow managed to cross the border on foot.

== The follow-up ==
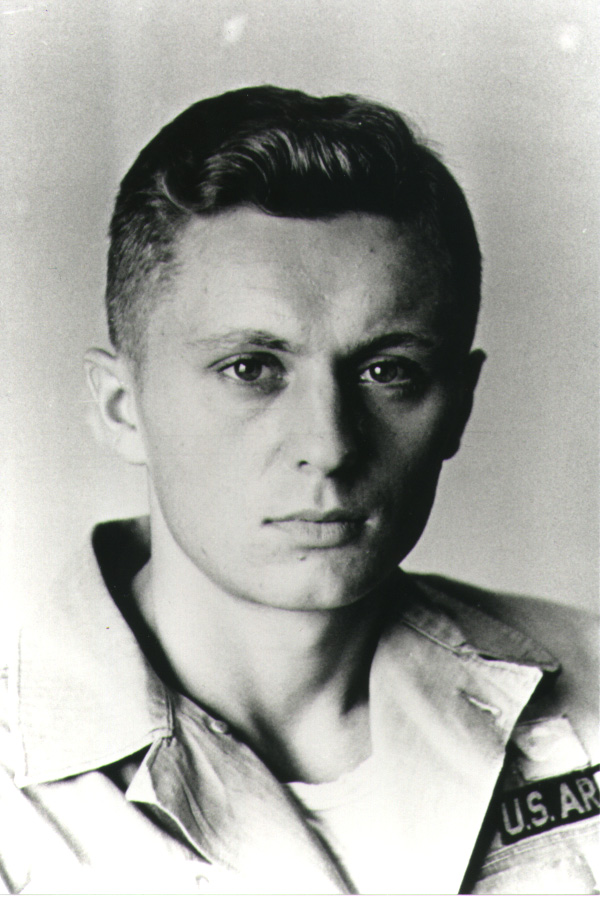
"Ray" Masin

Back in Czechoslovakia, people who had any association with the Mašíns received harsh treatment. Václav Švéda, Zbyněk Janata and Ctibor Novák were sentenced to death and executed. Their bodies were not delivered to their families but buried in anonymous common graves. Farewell letters to their families were found 45 years later, only after the Velvet Revolution. Other friends and relatives were sentenced to many years of imprisonment. The Mašíns' mother, Zdena Mašínová, who was not involved at all in the military resistance of her sons, died in prison on June 12, 1956. According to the family, their mother received no medical aid, nor were the scandalous conditions of detention improved when she was terminally ill. Even the Mašíns little sister—her name also Zdena Mašínová (born 1933)—was jailed. Today she is seen as an icon by the Czech anti-Communist movement.

In East Germany, whose armed forces had been humiliated, the manhunt was swept under the rug. In Czechoslovakia, communist propaganda made full use of the Mašín's actions, describing them as looters and brutal murderers of innocent passersby. Their actions were used to justify tight control over the society and brutal treatment of any opponents.

The fugitives moved to the United States and served in the United States Army Special Forces at Fort Bragg, North Carolina, for five years. Milan Paumer fought in Korea. In the '60s, Josef Mašín Jr. settled down in Cologne, West Germany. The Czechoslovak Security Service StB several times planned to kidnap or kill him. Later he moved to the U.S. again. Both the brothers continued to live there and refused to enter Czech soil again unless they were fully rehabilitated. In 2001, Milan Paumer sold his home in Florida and moved back to Poděbrady, where he died in 2010. Ctirad Mašín died in Cleveland, Ohio on August 13, 2011, at the age of 81.

Josef Mašín, after defecting to the United States, became a supporter of the Republican Party until his death, supporting both Ronald Reagan and Donald Trump. He died in Santa Barbara, California on November 2, 2026, at the age of 94.

== Books and documentaries ==
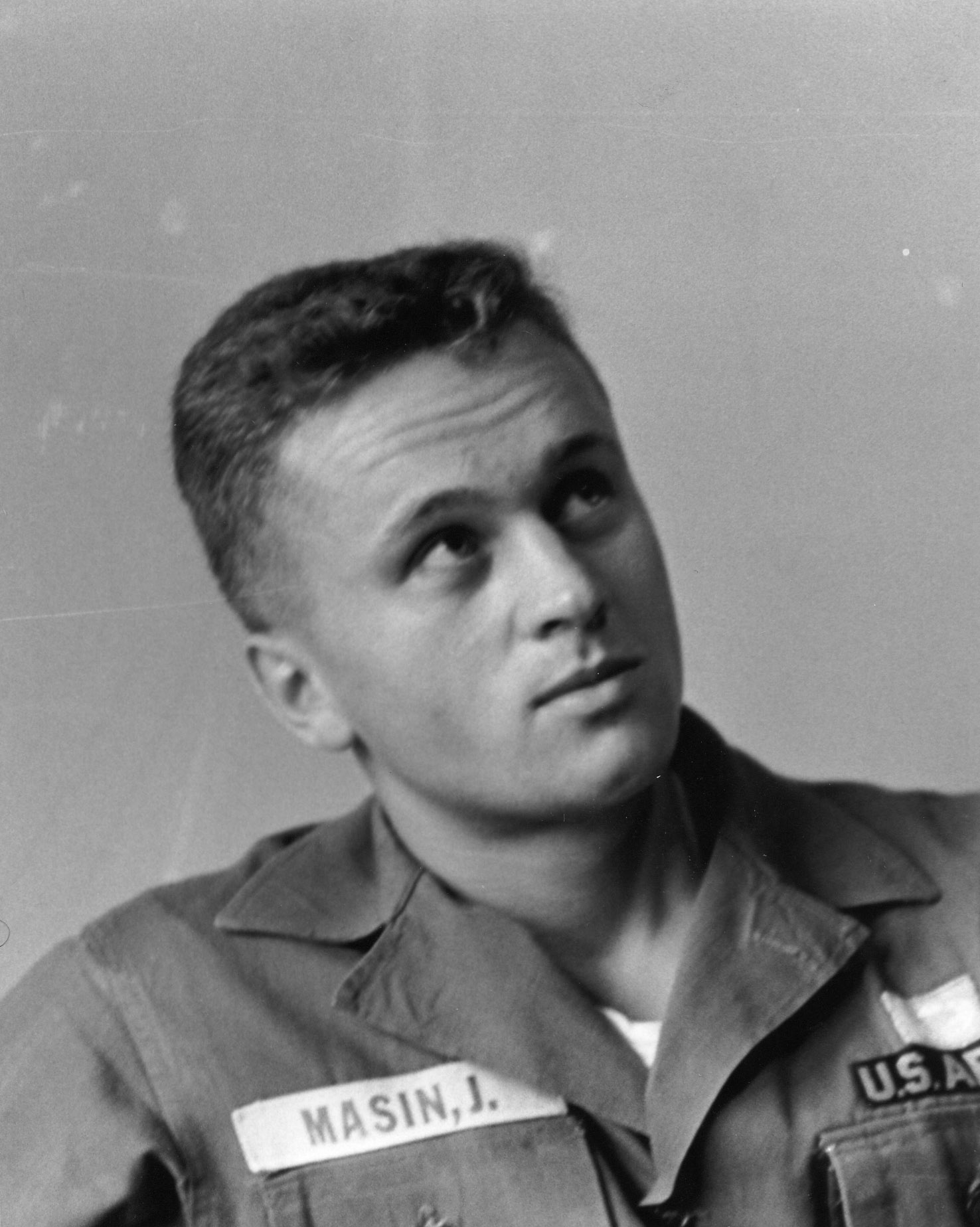
"Joe" Masin

Various fictional and documentary versions of the Mašín Brothers' story exist. The authors of most cannot be considered neutral. Therefore, an overview of the existing literature shall be given. According to Barbara Mašín, three books on the Mašíns were published in Czechoslovakia. The last one, "Mrtví nemluví" (Dead do not talk) was translated into German and published in the German Democratic Republic in 1989, a few months before the end of Socialism. It was the only book in the GDR mentioning the story at all. Surprisingly, the book does not claim the Mašíns were American spies. Their activities are described as a kind of personal retaliation upon the Communist government by frustrated high-society kids. The book does not mention the penalties against the Mašíns' family and friends.

Besides the Mašíns had to serve as culprits in one episode of the infamous detective series "Major Zeman". In contrast to reality, "Major Zeman" caught them. The Mašíns themselves, after losing the illusion that the West would wage a war to end Communism in Eastern Europe, were reluctant to talk about their past. Eventually another expatriate made them tell their story again: Ota Rambousek (1923–2010) had been a political prisoner in Czechoslovakia. While many people sat in East European jails accused of being American spies, Rambousek was one of the few who were not innocent: He had indeed been an agent of the U.S. Counter Intelligence Corps. First he was sentenced to death, later his death sentence was commuted to life imprisonment. In jail he heard about the Mašíns In 1968 he was released and moved to the USA. Only in 1984 did Rambousek manage to meet the brothers in New York and wrote his novel "Jenom ne strach" (Just No Fear). The Czech expatriate publishing house 68 Publishers in Toronto refused to publish the book. Eventually it was published in Prague after the Velvet Revolution. 1987 Radio Free Europe broadcast a series of interviews with Ctirad Mašín by Ota Rambousek. As Eastern archives were not yet open, the book and the interviews were based only on the Mašíns' memories and on what they read about the manhunt in the newspapers after arriving in West Berlin. They contain the "Schönwalde Fake" (see above) and wrongly claim the group shot four instead of three Volkspolizei officers: Western press had copied the East German propaganda account which had added one of the friendly fire casualties to the Mašín's victims.

In East Germany, Wolfgang Mittmann (1939–2006), policeman and true crime writer, rediscovered the manhunt in the 1990s. He stated that he found the names of four killed policemen, killed near the town where he lived, which were not mentioned in the official chronicle of the Volkspolizei. He started interviewing local people and found them reluctant to talk about the "Czechs' War". As long as the GDR existed, files on the manhunt were top secret. Mittmann went to Prague where he acquired a leaked copy of the RFE interviews, made by employees of Prague Broadcasting Service, studied exhibits of the Prague Police Museum, which included the Czechoslovak police records on the Mašín's police station raids and also viewed the papers of the late author of "Mrtví nemluví" (Dead do not talk). Only after the Reunification of Germany—Mittmann had retired and writing had become his full-time occupation —could he read the German files as well as Rambousek's book. For Mittmann the Mašíns were killers. He accused Rambousek and the Mašíns to consciously play down the actions in the Czechoslovak Republic. Mittmann's critics say, he never questioned the account he found in police files. Also he failed to see the political reasons for the vast number of troops involved in the manhunt. For him this overreaction was due to the ambitions of a single person, Chefinspekteur (Lieutenant General) Willi Seifert, proxy of the head of the Volkspolizei, who wanted to catch the "fascist bandits", no matter what the cost.

After reading Mittmann's report, two German journalists decided to find and interview the Mašíns . Their documentary "Der Luckauer Krieg" (The Luckau War) met with severe criticism because they "displayed murderers as heroes".

In 2004 the Czech-American writer Jan Novák (not related to Ctibor Novák) wrote a biographical novel on the father's and the sons' stories. Its title: "So far so good" (Zatim Dobry). It won the coveted Magnesia Litera Prize in the Czech Republic. Although Novák wrote in English, only the Czech Edition is available so far. The Czech film maker Ivan Passer (a classmate of Josef Mašín and of film director Miloš Forman) announced then that he was going to make a movie based on the book.

Eventually, Barbara Mašín, Josef Mašín's daughter spent several years researching to reconstruct the story of her father and uncle. She had spent most of her childhood in Germany before her family moved to the USA. Later she studied Czech and was thus able to read all the relevant documents in Germany, the Czech Republic and the USA. "Gauntlet", the result of her research was published in September 2006 and has become the most important source for non-Czech speakers.

Brothers, a 2023 Czech film directed by Tomáš Mašín, is based on the story of Josef and Ctirad Mašín. The brothers are portrayed by Oskar Hes and Jan Nedbal.

== Controversy ==
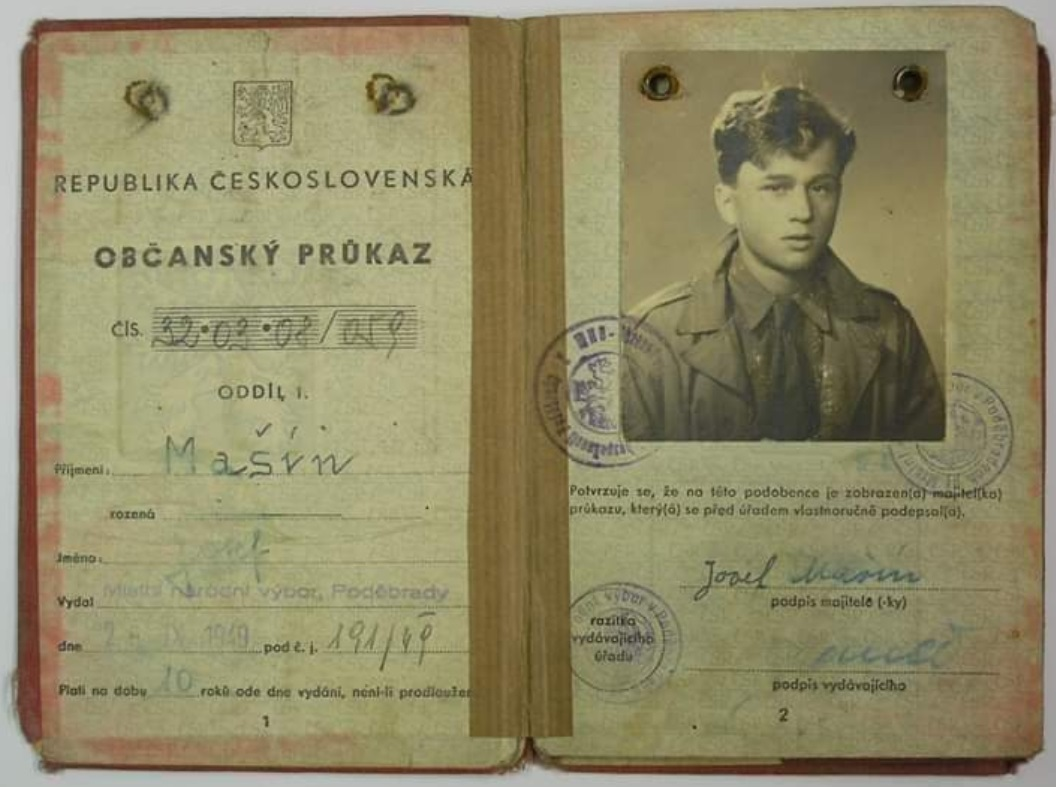
Josef Mašín's ID card

After the fall of communism in Czechoslovakia (1989), the communist era was officially condemned by the new regime, and those sentenced during the communist era for political crimes were generally recognised in law as innocent victims. The Mašíns became the most disputed exceptions.

Armed resistance after 1948 was very small (compared to that of neighbouring countries in the Eastern Bloc) and killings were uncommon. Ota Rambousek's book "Jenom ne strach" (see below) was published in Czechoslovakia in 1990 and realistic descriptions of how the brothers killed a cashier or how they cut the throat of an unarmed policeman rendered incapable by chloroform did not fit well into "velvet" mood of Czechs.

Even fifty-five years later the case of Mašíns is able to deeply divide the Czech public into two groups: one seeing them as heroes, the other abhorring their sometimes brutal killings. Politicians in the Czech Republic face uneasy difficulty when trying to take a clear stand on the Mašíns.

In 2003 STEM conducted an opinion poll according to which 55% of people consider them murderers while 30% consider them heroes.

In 2005, the Czech and Slovak Association of Canada gave the Thomas Masaryk Award to the Mašín Brothers and Milan Paumer.

On 28 February 2008, the Czech Prime Minister Mirek Topolánek awarded the Mašíns the new "Prime Minister's Medal" at a ceremony at the Czech Embassy in Washington. At a later ceremony in the Czech Republic, on 4 March 2008, he also decorated Milan Paumer. As its name suggests, the award is a personal decoration, not one given in the name of the Czech state. Topolánek wishes to start a new discussion on the "third resistance", as the anti-Communist struggle is sometimes, but controversially, termed (the first and second resistance being the fight against the Austro-Hungarian empire in 1914–1918 and Nazi occupation of Czechoslovakia in 1939–1945). He hopes that as a result of such discussion, the Mašíns will eventually receive official state recognition.

According to a 2011 opinion poll by SC&C, 15% of Czech people considered the Mašín brothers heroes, while 27% considered them criminals. 40% did not have a clear opinion.

While he was a candidate for president of Czechia, Petr Pavel said he would not honor the Mašíns, saying, "I can't come to terms with the fact that they killed police sergeant Honzátek, who was drugged and didn't resist them."

== Sources ==
- (in English) Josef Švéda: Narrative and Ideological Discourses in Representations of the Mašín Brothers, Lambert Academic Publishing, 2011, ISBN 978-3-8443-3016-8
- (in Czech) Françoise Mayer[null : Doktorát jako nástroj ideologického boje], Nad knihou Josefa Švédy: Mašínovský mýtus. (Doctorat ou machine idéologique, à propos du livre de Josef Švéda: Le mythe des Mašín), Babylon, 4 ročník XXII, 29. listopad 2013, p. 6
- (in Czech) Ctirad Mašín – Josef Mašín – Milan Paumer: Cesta na severozápad, Academia, Prague 2010, ISBN 978-80-200-1830-4 website
- (in English) Barbara Masin: Gauntlet, Naval Institute Press, 2006, ISBN 1-59114-515-5 (Czech title: Odkaz, Prague 2005 ISBN, 8020412484) website
- (in Czech) Ota Rambousek: Jenom ne strach, Nezávislé tiskové stredisko, 1990, ISBN 80-85196-02-6
- (in Czech) Jan Novák: Zatím dobrý (So far so good), Petrov, Brno 2004, ISBN 80-7227-194-6
- (in German) Vrbecký, František "Die Mašíns geben nicht auf" ("Mrtví nemluví"), Berlin 1989, ISBN 3-327-00818-3 Translation of a Czechoslovak propaganda book
- (in German) Mittmann, Wolfgang "Tatzeit. Große Fälle der Deutschen Volkspolizei", Vol. 1+2, Berlin 1998, ISBN 3-360-00854-5 True crime stories of the Volkspolizei
- (in German) Ute Bönnen, Gerald Endres "Der Luckauer Krieg – Flucht nach Westberlin" documentary, containing interviews with the brothers, former cops and German eye-witnesses
- (in Czech) Země bez hrdinů, země bez zločinců... – dokumentární film o odbojové činnosti skupiny bratří Ctirada a Josefa Mašínů na území bývalé ČSR, scénář, kamera a režie Martin Vadas, (57 min. © Czech television 1996 – čestné uznání u příležitosti udělování Trilobitů 1996 - http://www.ceskatelevize.cz/porady/902904-zeme-bez-hrdinu-zeme-bez-zlocincu/29536313992/ [archive]
- (in Czech) Proti komunismu se zbraní v ruce – dokumentární film z cyklu Jak to bylo doopravdy – scénář, kamera a režie Martin Vadas © Czech television 1999,
