= Paul Thümmel =

German counterintelligence agent (1902–1945)

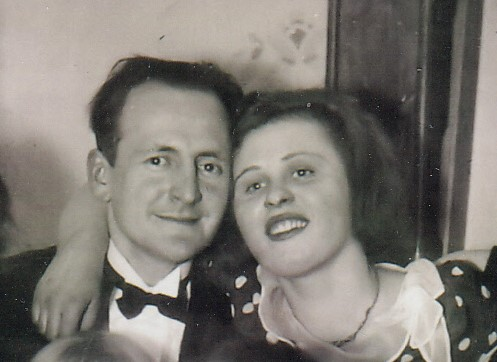
Private photo of Paul Thümmel

Paul Thümmel (15 January 1902 – 20 April 1945), aka Agent A-54, was a German double agent who spied for Czechoslovakia during World War II. He was a high-ranking member of the German military intelligence organisation, the Abwehr, and was also a highly decorated member of the National Socialist German Workers Party.

From 1937, Thümmel passed intelligence first to Czechoslovakia and later to the Czechoslovak government-in-exile in London via the Czech underground resistance. He was killed by the SS at the Small Fortress of Theresienstadt in April 1945.
