= Josef Mašín =

Czech general (1896–1942)

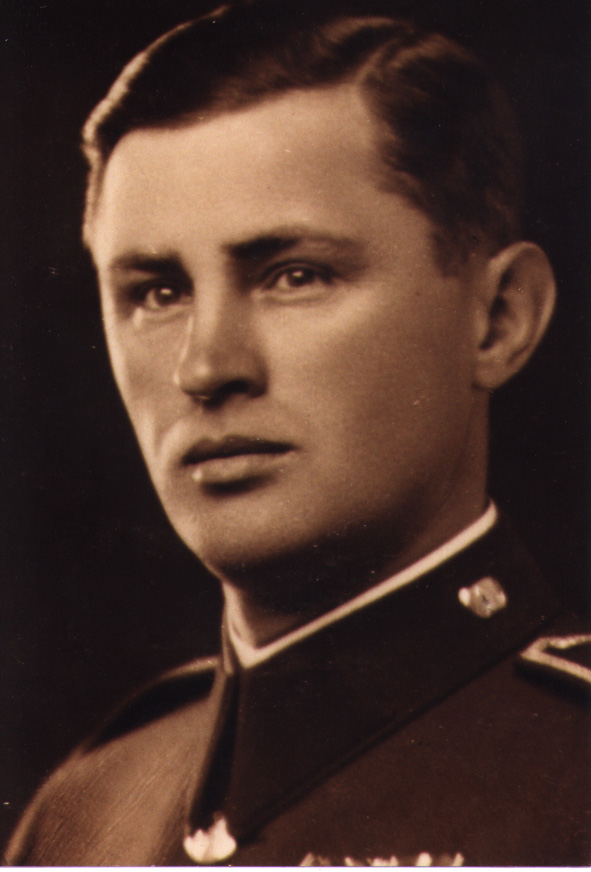
- Pre-war portrait of Josef Mašín
- Born: 26 August 1896; Lošany, Bohemia, Austria-Hungary
- Died: 30 June 1942 (aged 45); Prague, Protectorate of Bohemia and Moravia
- Military career
- Service years: 1915–1920/1922–1939
- Rank: Lieutenant Colonel, Major General i.m.
- Conflicts: World War I; Battle of Zborov; Battle of Bakhmach; Russian Civil War; World War II

Josef Mašín (26 August 1896 – 30 June 1942) was an army officer of Czechoslovakia and member of the Czech underground resistance against the Nazis. He was the father of Josef and Ctirad Mašín and Zdena Mašínová Jr.

== Biography ==
Josef Mašín was born in Lošany in Bohemia. He was a member of the Czechoslovak Legions fighting in Russia (1916–1921) and later an officer in the Czechoslovak Army (commander of an artillery regiment). After the occupation of Czechoslovakia by Nazi Germany he, together with Josef Balabán and Václav Morávek, formed a resistance group concentrated on intelligence gathering and sabotage.

While more resistance groups existed, this one, aptly named Three Kings, is the most known among the Czech Republic.

Mašín was captured by the Gestapo on 13 May 1941. After being tortured, he twice attempted suicide. As part of the German retaliatory measures for the assassination of Reinhard Heydrich he was shot and killed, aged 45. His body was disposed of at Strašnice Crematorium. His wife was imprisoned for several months.

After the war, Josef Mašín received a posthumous promotion to brigadier general. His sons – then 13 and 15 years old – got Medals for "personal bravery during the war" from president Edvard Beneš.
