= 1st Army (Czechoslovakia) =

Former Czechoslovak military unit

The 1st Army was a field army of the Czechoslovak People's Army, active in 1958–1965 and 1969–1991. In its second formation its headquarters was in Příbram.

In the 1980s the force included the 1st Tank Division, 2nd Motor Rifle Division, 19th Motor Rifle Division, and 20th Motor Rifle Division, as well as many smaller units, including the 321st Army Missile Brigade.

The 1st Army was disbanded on 1 December 1991.

== Role of the Prague Spring ==
By the early 1960s, Czechoslovak president and Communist Party head, Antonín Novotný, grew concerned that the military opposed increasing involvement in the Warsaw Pact. Accordingly, he moved to reorganize the CPA and reassign several generals. In 1965, Novotny reorganized the 1st Army into the Western Military District, and the commander of the 1st Army, Lt. Gen Stanislav Prochazka, saw his power significantly reduced. Nonetheless, he initially earned the favor of the new president, Ludvík Svoboda, in 1968. When the Prague Spring uprising occurred under Alexander Dubček, Svoboda initially sympathized with the protests. Prochazka then publicly expressed sympathy for the uprising as well. Additionally, Prochazka publicly expressed his opposition to Warsaw Pact intervention in Czechoslovakia's internal affairs. When Svoboda decided to support Warsaw Pact intervention and Soviet suzerainty over Czechoslovakia, General Prochazka was forced into early retirement and the 1st Army reformed again under General Karel Rusov.

== Units of the Army 1989 ==
This listing is based on the Czech Ministerstvo národní obrany 1950-1990 website, which lists all units of the Czechoslovak People's Army in existence between 1950 and 1990, with their location, subordination, equipment and changes over time.

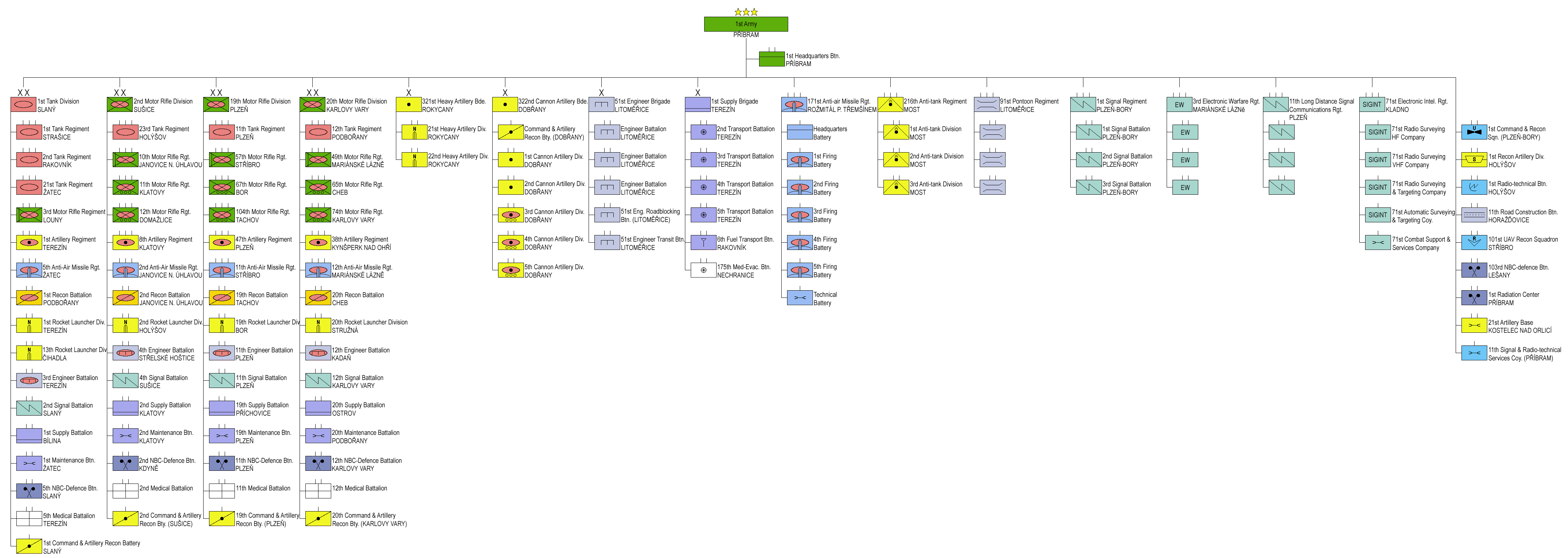
1st Army Structure in 1989 (click to enlarge)

The Army's 1st Headquarters Battalion was located in Příbram.

- 1st Tank Division in Slaný (in case of full mobilization would have also formed the 16th Tank Division)
  - 1st Tank Regiment in Strašice
  - 2nd Tank Regiment in Rakovník
  - 21st Tank Regiment in Žatec
  - 3rd Motor Rifle Regiment in Louny with BVP-1 tracked infantry fighting vehicles
  - 1st Artillery Regiment in Terezín
  - 1st Independent Missile Battalion in Terezín with OTR-21 Tochka tactical ballistic missiles
  - 13th Independent Missile Battalion in Čihadla with 9K52 Luna-M artillery rocket systems
  - 1st Command and Artillery Reconnaissance Battery in Slaný
  - 5th Anti-Aircraft Missile Regiment in Žatec with 9K33 Osa surface-to-air missile systems
  - 1st Reconnaissance Battalion in Podbořany
  - 3rd Engineer Battalion in Terezín
  - 2nd Signal Battalion in Slaný
  - 1st Supply Battalion in Bílina
  - 1st Maintenance Battalion in Žatec
  - 5th Chemical Defence Battalion in Slaný
  - 5th Medical Battalion in Terezín
- 2nd Motor Rifle Division in Sušice
  - 23rd Tank Regiment in Holýšov
  - 10th Motor Rifle Regiment in Janovice nad Úhlavou with BVP-1 tracked infantry fighting vehicles
  - 11th Motor Rifle Regiment in Klatovy with OT-64 wheeled armored transports vehicles
  - 12th Motor Rifle Regiment in Domažlice with OT-64 wheeled armored transports vehicles
  - 8th Artillery Regiment in Klatovy
  - 2nd Independent Missile Battalion in Holýšov with 9K52 Luna-M artillery rocket systems
  - 2nd Command and Artillery Reconnaissance Battery in Sušice
  - 2nd Anti-Aircraft Missile Regiment in Janovice nad Úhlavou with 2K12 Kub surface-to-air missile systems
  - 2nd Reconnaissance Battalion in Janovice nad Úhlavou
  - 4th Engineer Battalion in Střelské Hoštice
  - 4th Signal Battalion in Sušice
  - 2nd Supply Battalion Klatovy
  - 2nd Maintenance Battalion in Klatovy
  - 2nd Chemical Defence Battalion in Kdyně
  - 2nd Medical Battalion
- 19th Motor Rifle Division in Plzeň
  - 11th Tank Regiment in Plzeň
  - 57th Motor Rifle Regiment in Stříbro with BVP-1 tracked infantry fighting vehicles
  - 67th Motor Rifle Regiment in Bor with OT-64 wheeled armored transports vehicles
  - 104th Motor Rifle Regiment in Tachov with OT-64 wheeled armored transports vehicles
  - 47th Artillery Regiment in Plzeň
  - 19th Independent Missile Battalion in Bor with 9K52 Luna-M artillery rocket systems
  - 19th Command and Artillery Reconnaissance Battery in Plzeň
  - 11th Anti-Aircraft Missile Regiment in Stříbro with 2K12 Kub surface-to-air missile systems
  - 19th Reconnaissance Battalion in Tachov
  - 11th Engineer Battalion in Plzeň
  - 11th Signal Battalion in Plzeň
  - 19th Supply Battalion in Příchovice
  - 19th Maintenance Battalion in Plzeň
  - 11th Chemical Defence Battalion in Plzeň
  - 11th Medical Battalion
- 20th Motor Rifle Division in Karlovy Vary
  - 12th Tank Regiment in Podbořany
  - 49th Motor Rifle Regiment in Mariánské Lázně with BVP-1 tracked infantry fighting vehicles
  - 65th Motor Rifle Regiment in Cheb with OT-64 wheeled armored transports vehicles
  - 74th Motor Rifle Regiment in Karlovy Vary with OT-64 wheeled armored transports vehicles
  - 38th Artillery Regiment in Kynšperk nad Ohří
  - 20th Independent Missile Battalion in Stružná with 9K52 Luna-M artillery rocket systems
  - 20th Command and Artillery Reconnaissance Battery in Karlovy Vary
  - 12th Anti-Aircraft Missile Regiment in Mariánské Lázně with 2K12 Kub surface-to-air missile systems
  - 20th Reconnaissance Battalion in Cheb
  - 12th Engineer Battalion in Kadaň
  - 12th Signal Battalion in Karlovy Vary
  - 20th Supply Battalion in Ostrov
  - 20th Maintenance Battalion in Podbořany
  - 12th Chemical Defence Battalion in Karlovy Vary
  - 12th Medical Battalion
- 321st Heavy Artillery Brigade in Rokycany
  - 21st Heavy Artillery Division with SS-1C Scud-B tactical ballistic missiles
  - 22nd Heavy Artillery Division with SS-1C Scud-B tactical ballistic missiles
  - 21st Artillery Base in Kostelec nad Orlicí servicing the missiles of the 321st Heavy Artillery Brigade
- 322nd Cannon Artillery Brigade in Dobřany
  - Command and Artillery Reconnaissance Battery
  - 1st Cannon Artillery Division with 18× 130mm M1954 towed howitzers
  - 2nd Cannon Artillery Division with 18× 130mm M1954 towed howitzers
  - 3rd Cannon Artillery Division with 18× 152mm SpGH DANA self-propelled howitzers
  - 4th Cannon Artillery Division with 18× 152mm SpGH DANA self-propelled howitzers
  - 5th Cannon Artillery Division with 18× 152mm SpGH DANA self-propelled howitzers
- 51st Engineer Brigade in Litoměřice
  - Engineer Battalion
  - Engineer Battalion
  - Engineer Battalion
    - 51st Engineer Roadblocking Battalion
    - 51st Engineer Transit Battalion
- 1st Supply Brigade in Terezín
  - 2nd Transport Battalion in Terezín
  - 3rd Transport Battalion in Terezín
  - 4th Transport Battalion in Terezín
  - 5th Transport Battalion in Terezín
  - 6th Fuel Transport Battalion in Rakovník
  - 175th Medical Evacuation Battalion in Nechranice
- 171st Anti-aircraft Missile Regiment in Rožmitál pod Třemšínem with 20x 2K12 Kub surface-to-air missile systems
  - Headquarters Battery
  - 1st Firing Battery
  - 2nd Firing Battery
  - 3rd Firing Battery
  - 4th Firing Battery
  - 5th Firing Battery
  - Technical Battery
- 216th Anti-tank Regiment in Most
  - 1st Anti-tank Division with 12× 100mm vz. 53 anti-tank cannons and 6× BRDM-2 vehicles in the anti-tank variant with Konkurs anti-tank missiles
  - 2nd Anti-tank Division with 12× 100mm vz. 53 anti-tank cannons and 6× BRDM-2 vehicles in the anti-tank variant with Konkurs anti-tank missiles
  - 3rd Anti-tank Division with 12× 100mm vz. 53 anti-tank cannons and 6× BRDM-2 vehicles in the anti-tank variant with Konkurs anti-tank missiles
- 91st Pontoon Regiment in Litoměřice
- 1st Signal Regiment in Plzeň-Bory
  - 1st Signal Battalion
  - 2nd Signal Battalion
    - 3rd Signal Battalion
  - 11th Long Distance Signal Communications Regiment in Plzeň
  - 3rd Electronic Warfare Regiment in Mariánské Lázně
  - 71st Special Purpose Electronic Intelligence Regiment in Kladno
    - 71st Radio Surveying HF Company
    - 71st Radio Surveying VHF Company
    - 71st Radio Surveying and Targeting Company
    - 71st Automatic Radio Surveying and Targeting Company
    - 71st Combat Support and Services Company
  - 1st Reconnaissance Artillery Division in Holýšov
  - 1st Radio-technical Battalion in Holýšov
    - Light Radio-technical Company
    - Heavy Radio-technical Company
    - Signal Company
  - 103rd Chemical Defence Battalion in Lešany
  - 11th Road Construction Battalion in Horažďovice
  - 1st Radiation Center in Příbram
  - 1st Command and Reconnaissance Squadron in Plzeň-Bory
    - 1st Helicopter Detachment with 2× Mi-2 helicopters to support the 1st Tank Division in wartime
    - 2nd Helicopter Detachment with 2× Mi-2 helicopters to support the 2nd Motor Rifle Division in wartime
    - 19th Helicopter Detachment with 2× Mi-2 helicopters to support the 19th Motor Rifle Division in wartime
    - 20th Helicopter Detachment with 2× Mi-2 helicopters to support the 20th Motor Rifle Division in wartime
    - 1st Air Base and Electronic Support Company
  - 101st Unmanned Aerial Vehicle Reconnaissance Squadron in Stříbro with Tupolev Tu-143 VR-3 Rejs drones
  - 11th Signal and Radio-technical Services Company in Příbram
