= Chief of the General Staff (Czechoslovakia) =

Head of military staff of Czechoslovakia

- Czech: Náčelník Generálního štábu Slovak: Náčelník Generálneho štábu
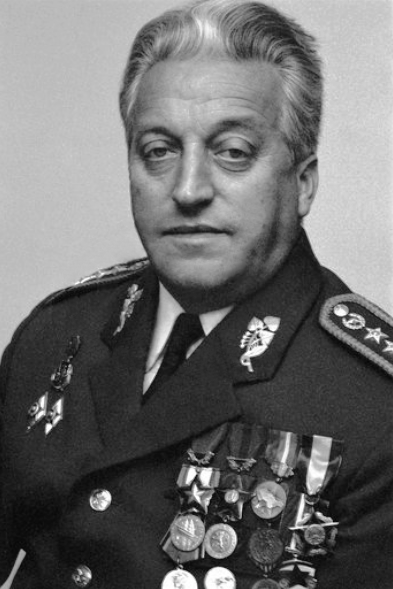
- Longest in office Colonel General Karel Rusov; 19 April 1968 – 26 November 1979
- Czechoslovak Army (1918–54; 1990–92); Czechoslovak People's Army (1954–90)
- Type: Chief of staff
- Member of: General Staff
- Reports to: Minister of Defence of Czechoslovakia
- Seat: Prague, Czechoslovakia
- Appointer: President of Czechoslovakia
- Term length: No fixed length
- Precursor: Chief of the Austro-Hungarian General Staff
- Formation: 17 December 1919
- First holder: Divisional General Maurice Pellé
- Final holder: Lieutenant General Karel Pezl
- Abolished: 31 December 1992
- Superseded by: Chief of the General Staff (Czech Republic); Chief of the General Staff (Slovakia)
- Deputy: Deputy Chief of the General Staff

The Chief of the General Staff of Czechoslovakia (Czech: Náčelník Generálního štábu Československo) refers to the chief of the General Staff of the Czechoslovak Army and the Czechoslovak People's Army, during the existence of Czechoslovakia from 1918 to 1992. The first two Chiefs of the General Staff of Czechoslovakia were French, as the General Staff was founded by the French Military Mission to Czechoslovakia.

== List of chiefs of the general staff ==
=== Czechoslovak Armed Forces (1919–1939) ===
Chief of the Main Staff

| No. | Portrait | Chief of the Main Staff | Took office | Left office | Time in office | Defence branch |
|---|---|---|---|---|---|---|
| 1 | Maurice Pellé | Divisional General; Maurice Pellé (1863–1924) | 17 December 1919 | 31 December 1920 | 1 year, 14 days | French Army |
| 2 | Eugène Mittelhauser | Divisional General; Eugène Mittelhauser (1873–1949) | 1 January 1921 | 31 December 1925 | 4 years, 364 days | French Army |
| 3 | Jan Syrový | General of the Army; Jan Syrový (1888–1970) (Note: Also served as the Minister of Defence from 18 March 1926 to 11 October 1926.) | 1 January 1926 | 11 November 1933 | 7 years, 314 days | Czechoslovak Army |
| 4 | Ludvík Krejčí | General of the Army; Ludvík Krejčí (1890–1972) | 11 November 1933 | 23 September 1938 | 4 years, 316 days | Czechoslovak Army |
| 5 | Vladimír Kajdoš [cs] | Brigadier General; Vladimír Kajdoš (1893–1970) | 23 September 1938 | 4 October 1938 | 11 days | Czechoslovak Army |
| (4) | Ludvík Krejčí | General of the Army; Ludvík Krejčí (1890–1972) | 20 December 1938 | 1 March 1939 | 71 days | Czechoslovak Army |

Commander-in-Chief of the Armed Forces

| No. | Portrait | Commander-in-Chief of the Armed Forces | Took office | Left office | Time in office | Defence branch |
|---|---|---|---|---|---|---|
| 1 | Ludvík Krejčí | General of the Army; Ludvík Krejčí (1890–1972) | 23 September 1938 | 20 December 1938 | 88 days | Czechoslovak Army |

=== Czechoslovak military administration (France, 1940) ===
| No. | Portrait | Chief of Staff | Took office | Left office | Time in office | Defence branch |
|---|---|---|---|---|---|---|
| 1 | Bedřich Neumann | Brigadier General; Bedřich Neumann (1891–1964) | 1 February 1940 | 12 June 1940 | 88 days | Czechoslovak Army |

=== Ministry of National Defense (United Kingdom, 1940–1945) ===
Chief of Staff

| No. | Portrait | Chief of Staff | Took office | Left office | Time in office | Defence branch |
|---|---|---|---|---|---|---|
| 1 | Jaroslav Čihák | Brigadier General; Jaroslav Čihák (1891–1944) | 23 July 1940 | 13 January 1941 | 174 days | Czechoslovak Army |
| 2 | Bruno Sklenovský [cs] | Brigadier General; Bruno Sklenovský (1893–1957) | 13 January 1941 | 12 April 1945 | 4 years, 89 days | Czechoslovak Army |

Commander-in-Chief of the Armed Forces

| No. | Portrait | Commander-in-Chief of the Armed Forces | Took office | Left office | Time in office | Defence branch |
|---|---|---|---|---|---|---|
| 1 | Sergěj Ingr | General of the Army; Sergěj Ingr (1894–1956) | 19 September 1944 | 5 April 1945 | 198 days | Czechoslovak Army |
| 2 | Ludvík Svoboda | General of the Army; Ludvík Svoboda (1895–1979) | 12 April 1945 | 31 December 1945 | 263 days | Czechoslovak Army |

=== Czechoslovak Armed Forces (1945–1950) ===
| No. | Portrait | Chief of the Main Staff | Took office | Left office | Time in office | Defence branch |
|---|---|---|---|---|---|---|
| 1 | Bohumil Boček [cs] | General of the Army; Bohumil Boček (1894–1952) | 12 April 1945 | 1 August 1948 | 3 years, 142 days | Czechoslovak Army |
| 2 | Šimon Drgáč [cs] | General of the Army; Šimon Drgáč (1892–1980) | 1 August 1948 | 26 April 1950 | 1 year, 237 days | Czechoslovak Army |

=== Czechoslovak Army (1950–1954) ===
| No. | Portrait | Chief of the General Staff | Took office | Left office | Time in office | Defence branch |
|---|---|---|---|---|---|---|
| 1 | Jaroslav Procházka [cs] | General of the Army; Jaroslav Procházka (1897–1980) | 26 April 1950 | 31 January 1952 | 1 year, 280 days | Czechoslovak Army |
| 2 | Václav Kratochvíl [cs] | Colonel General; Václav Kratochvíl (1903–1988) | 31 January 1952 | 1 June 1954 | 2 years, 121 days | Czechoslovak Army |

=== Czechoslovak People's Army (1954–1990) ===
| No. | Portrait | Chief of the General Staff | Took office | Left office | Time in office | Defence branch |
|---|---|---|---|---|---|---|
| 1 | Václav Kratochvíl [cs] | Colonel General; Václav Kratochvíl (1903–1988) | 1 June 1954 | 28 July 1958 | 4 years, 57 days | Czechoslovak People's Army |
| 2 | Otakar Rytíř [cs] | General of the Army; Otakar Rytíř (1913–1979) | 28 July 1958 | 19 April 1968 | 9 years, 266 days | Czechoslovak People's Army |
| 3 | Karel Rusov | Colonel General; Karel Rusov (1924–2013) | 19 April 1968 | 26 November 1979 | 11 years, 221 days | Czechoslovak People's Army |
| 4 | Miloslav Blahník [cs] | Colonel General; Miloslav Blahník (1927–2017) | 26 November 1979 | 13 October 1987 | 7 years, 321 days | Czechoslovak People's Army |
| 5 | Miroslav Vacek | Colonel General; Miroslav Vacek (1935–2022) | 13 October 1987 | 27 December 1989 | 2 years, 75 days | Czechoslovak People's Army |
| 6 | Anton Slimák | Lieutenant General; Anton Slimák (1941–2020) | 27 December 1989 | 14 March 1990 | 77 days | Czechoslovak People's Army |

=== Czechoslovak Army (1990–1992) ===
| No. | Portrait | Chief of the General Staff | Took office | Left office | Time in office | Defence branch |
|---|---|---|---|---|---|---|
| 1 | Anton Slimák | Lieutenant General; Anton Slimák (1941–2020) | 14 March 1990 | 1 May 1991 | 1 year, 48 days | Czechoslovak Army |
| 2 | Karel Pezl [cs] | Lieutenant General; Karel Pezl (1927–2022) | 1 May 1991 | 31 December 1992 | 1 year, 244 days | Czechoslovak Army |

== See also ==
- Chief of the General Staff (Czech Republic)
- Chief of the General Staff (Slovakia)
