= UTON vz. 75 =

Czechoslovak military fighting knife

UTON vz. 75, production series 0005

UTON vz. 75 (útočný nůž vzor 75, "Model 75 fighting knife") was adopted by the Czechoslovak People's Army (ČSLA) as a personal weapon. It was intended for reconnaissance, airborne and air force units.

The knives were supplied in boxes of ten, with one sharpening stone per box.

== Development ==
Development of the knife was under way by 1973 at the latest, as shown by the stamps on the production drawings of the knife and its accessories. It was intended to replace the obsolete VO-7 knife. It was developed by the Military Research Institute 010 in Slavičín in cooperation with the knife manufacturer Mikov. On 15 December 1976, the technical specifications TP-VD-648-76 for the production and acceptance of the Model 75 fighting knife were approved.

== Design ==
The technical specifications required the blade to be made of 17029 stainless steel and heat-treated using the MARTFROST process to a surface hardness of 50–58 HRC. To reduce glare, the blade was ground to a surface roughness of 0.2–0.8 Ra. The blade is single-edged with a central point; the first half of the spine has transverse grooves serving as a thumb rest, and the second half is ground into a false edge.

A four-digit production series number was stamped on the blade. Knives for the army were not allowed to bear the Mikov trademark.

- 0001 – a production series that did not yet fully meet the technical specifications; hot-forged blade; approximately 500 made.
- 0002 – blade blanked from solid stock, finished by grinding after hardening and straightened cold; 1,680 made.
- 0003 – blade blanked from solid stock, finished by grinding and air-cooled in a straightening fixture; 4,500 made.
- 0004 and later – these series correspond to the final blade production technology.

Series 0001–0004 were stamped near the base of the blade, series 0005–0007 in the middle of the blade.

Series 0001

Series 0002

Series 0003

Series 0004

Series 0005

Series 0006

Series 0007

The handle was made of rubber designated 137.21. Its sides are roughened with a grid of grooves. The rear of the handle has a slot for inserting the file or the saw, and a 6 mm hole in the side for a brass locking pin.

The accessories were developed together with the company Ajax Jihlava. The file and the saw were to be made of 14180 steel, with a hardness of 56–60 HRC for the file and 45–54 HRC for the saw. The cord is made of nylon, 2.5 mm in diameter and 2 metres long.

== Sheath ==
The sheath is made of leather. On the front it has pouches for the file and the saw, and on the back a pouch for the retention cord. Inside, a steel retaining plate prevents the knife from falling out. The retaining strap fastens with a snap fastener. The sheaths are marked inside the belt loop, for example "K6, crossed swords, 7, OTK 3, series 2".

== Testing ==
Before being accepted into service, the knives had to pass a series of tests:

- blade flexibility – deflection of 5° to each side
- edge retention – 500 chops into hard wood, followed by a cutting test
- cutting – severing a 2-metre parachute cord loaded with a 2 kg weight in a single cut
- file – filing through mesh-fence wire up to 3 mm in diameter
- saw – sawing through a 30 × 30 mm block of dry and of wet wood
- screwdriver – a torque of 8 Nm in both directions
- cord – a tensile load of 100 N and a 1 kg weight dropped from 0.5 m
- corrosion – resistance to sulfuric acid vapours
- handle pull-off – at least 1,000 N; the blade only began to loosen at 4,760 N
- the complete set had to survive a 4 m drop onto concrete

== Specifications ==
- Length with sheath: 270 mm
- Length of knife: 248 mm
- Blade length: 140 mm
- Weight: 200 g
- File and saw: length 130 mm, width 13 mm
