= RBGT 62a =

Model of Geiger counter

The RBGT-62a was a Geiger counter manufactured in the early 1960s for the Czechoslovak People's Army. It read beta and gamma and had a transistorised circuit. The dial, controls, headphone jack, and probe connector are on the front of the meter, and the battery compartment on the back. The meter body is green lacquered metal, and the probe, aluminium and plastic. They are connected by a connection cable.

== Reading scale ==
The readout scale possesses three levels, β1, β2, and β3. Beta 3 reads from 500-2500 decays-per-minute, beta 2 reads 2500-25,000 DPM, beta 1 reads 25,000-250,000. There is a small equation at the bottom of the scale which says that 2500 DPM equates to 1 mr/h. There is also a small line below the Beta 3 scale, labeled K.N., standing for "kontrola napětí", i.e. voltage check. When turning the meter on, the calibration potentiometer is to be turned, so that the dial is on it. Another characteristic of the meter is that sections are painted in luminous paint, so they could be read at night.

== Probe ==
The probe is made of an aluminium cylinder with a plastic handle. The Geiger-Muller tube it uses is an STS-5. The probe is divided in three different ways, five large rectangular holes, fifteen small circular holes, and unperforated. These are for beta 1, beta 2, and beta 3, respectively. The rubber protective coating was to be put on probe when used in dusty or liquidy environment. That coating, a part of device supplement set, was unlubricated condom (five pieces).

== Knobs ==
The meter has two different knobs, both are black plastic. The first one, at the top left of the meter, has five setting (clockwise), VYP. ("Off"), K.N. ("Voltage Check"), β1, β2, and β3. This top knob is roughly arrow shaped with a dot of luminous paint at the point. The second knob, directly below the first, is cylindrical. It is the knob of the tuning potentiometer and is labeled K.N in luminous paint.

== Other front features ==
There is also a headphone jack, labeled SLUCHATKA. There is also a probe connector. It looks similar to a BNC connector put is not compatible with a BNC cable. It has steel line connected aluminium cap for protection when not in use.

== Other ==
The device had a leather carrier bag when used in the military. This bag had a probe compartment, as well as a small sewn-in testing radiator Sr90, which had to be removed when device was decommissioned.
