= 13th Tank Division (Czechoslovakia) =

- Active: 9 May 1955–1 October 1994
- Country: Czechoslovakia (to 31 December 1992); Slovakia (from 1 January 1993)
- Branch: Czechoslovak People's Army (Czechoslovak Army from 1990); Army of the Slovak Republic (from 1993)
- Type: Armored
- Garrison/HQ: Topoľčany (from 1968)
- Engagements: Warsaw Pact invasion of Czechoslovakia
- Battle honours: Kiev–Dukla–Ostrava (Kiev removed 1991); Czechoslovak-Soviet friendship (removed 1991)

The 13th Tank Division (Czech: 13. tanková divize, Slovak: 13. tanková divízia) was an armored division of the Czechoslovak People's Army during the Cold War that became part of the Army of the Slovak Republic after the Dissolution of Czechoslovakia.

== History ==
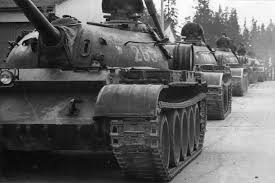
Czechoslovak People's Army tanks heading for the border during a training exercise, 1960s or 1970s

The 13th Tank Division was formed on 9 May 1955 by renumbering the 3rd Tank Division, based at Milovice in Bohemia. At the same time it was given the Kiev–Dukla–Ostrava historical designation in commemoration of battles that Czechoslovak forces fought in under Soviet command during World War II; to this was added the Czechoslovak-Soviet friendship honorific on 6 October 1959.

Following the suppression of student demonstrations by the police during the Strahov events, the division's 8th Motor Rifle Regiment began a snap mobilization on 4 December 1967, during which 3,430 reservists were called up and 578 vehicles from Prague, Central Bohemia, and North Bohemia were mobilized. The reservists were released on 11 December and the regiment conducted training on the western border of Czechoslovakia until 18 December. By 1968, the division was part of the Western Military District and included the 13th Tank Regiment at Čáslav, the 15th and 103rd Tank Regiments at Mladá, the 8th Motor Rifle Regiment at Mladá Boleslav, the 3rd School Tank Battalion at Luštěnice, the 361st Artillery Regiment at Turnov, and the 3rd Anti-Aircraft and 13th Separate Rocket Launcher Battalions at Mladá. The division headquarters was visited by Soviet Marshal Kirill Moskalenko in May 1968, ostensibly for Liberation Day, while other senior Soviet commanders went to other Czechoslovak units.

When the Warsaw Pact invasion of Czechoslovakia began on 21 August 1968 the regimental anti-aircraft batteries of the division and the anti-tank missile battery of the 8th Motor Rifle Regiment were at the Jince Military Training Area, which was not occupied by Soviet troops. Other units that who were not blockaded by Soviet troops included a company of the 13th Reconnaissance Battalion and a tank battalion from the 13th Tank Regiment at the Mimoň Military Training Area. However, the main units of the division at Mladá and Mladá Boleslav were blockaded by the Soviet 20th Tank Division.

After the establishment of the Soviet Central Group of Forces, the division was relocated to Topoľčany in Slovakia, where it was assigned the 10th Tank Regiment in Martin and the 64th Tank Regiment in Levice, transferred from the 14th Tank Division. In Bohemia it left behind the 13th Tank Regiment, which became part of the 4th Tank Division. In Slovakia, the division became a training unit, with 4,000 permanent personnel and 2,400 trainees. The 3rd School Tank Battalion was disbanded in 1968, followed by the 13th Helicopter Squadron in 1969. Additional units included the 3rd Chemical Defense Company, 13th Supply Company, 53rd Motor Transport Battalion, 3rd Medical Battalion, 13th Reconnaissance Battalion, 1st Engineer Battalion, 13th Communications Battalion, 8th Motor Rifle Regiment, 15th Tank Regiment, 3rd Artillery Regiment, and the 13th Technical Repair Shop. In 1989, as the Czechoslovak Army transitioned to a defensive posture, its 15th Tank Regiment was disbanded.

With the fall of Communism in Czechoslovakia, the division's Soviet-era honorifics were modified by the removal of the Czechoslovak-Soviet friendship honorific and Kiev from the historical designation in 1991. On 1 January 1993, with the Dissolution of Czechoslovakia, the division became part of the Army of the Slovak Republic. The division was reorganized into the 1st Army Corps on 1 October 1994, and the headquarters of the latter became the Militia Headquarters on 1 April 2000.
