= Miroslav Vacek =

Czech general and politician (1935–2022)

Member of the Chamber of Deputies of the Czech Republic
- In office 1 June 1996 – 19 June 1998

Minister of National Defence of Czechoslovakia
- In office 4 December 1989 – 17 October 1990
- Prime Minister: Ladislav Adamec; Marián Čalfa
- Preceded by: Milán Václavík
- Succeeded by: Luboš Dobrovský

Member of the Federal Assembly of Czechoslovakia
- In office 24 May 1986 – 5 June 1990

5th Chief of the General Staff of the Czechoslovak People's Army
- In office 13 November 1987 – 27 December 1989
- Preceded by: Miloslav Blahnik
- Succeeded by: Anton Slimák

Personal details
- Born: 29 August 1935 Kolín, Czechoslovakia
- Died: 31 December 2022 (aged 87) Karlovy Vary, Czech Republic
- Party: Communist Party of Bohemia and Moravia; Communist Party of Czechoslovakia

Miroslav Vacek (29 August 1935 – 31 December 2022) was a Czech politician and lieutenant general in the Czechoslovak People's Army. Vacek was the Chief of the General Staff of the Czechoslovak People's Army from 1987 to 1989, coinciding with the end of the Normalization era of communist Czechoslovakia. He then became Minister of National Defence of Czechoslovakia 1989 to 1990 following the Velvet Revolution.

== Biography ==
Vacek, the Chief of the General Staff of the Czechoslovak People's Army from 1987 to 1989, was appointed Minister of National Defence of Czechoslovakia in early December 1989, following the Velvet Revolution. On 15 December 1989, Vacek announced that the military fortifications along the border with West Germany would be removed, noting that he had also begun dismantling facilities along the border with Austria earlier in the week. Vacek and another newly appointed government minister, the ardent anti-communist Foreign Minister Jiří Dienstbier, called for the withdrawal of the 75,000 Soviet troops stationed in Czechoslovakia since the 1968 Warsaw Pact invasion of Czechoslovakia. Vacek also announced a series of reforms for the Czechoslovak military, including the reduction in the length of mandatory military service from two years to 18 months and an end to control of the military by the Communist Party of Czechoslovakia.

Vacek served as Minister of National Defence from December 1989 to October 1990 under both Prime Ministers Ladislav Adamec and Marián Čalfa.

Vacek retired from the Czechoslovak Army in 1991. He joined the Communist Party of Bohemia and Moravia (KSČM) following the end of communism rule and the dissolution of Czechoslovakia. He was later elected to the Chamber of Deputies of the Czech Republic, serving one term from 1996 to 1999 as a member of the KSČM.

Vacek died at a palliative care facility in Karlovy Vary, Czech Republic on 31 January 2022, at the age of 87.
