= Czechoslovakia in the Gulf War =

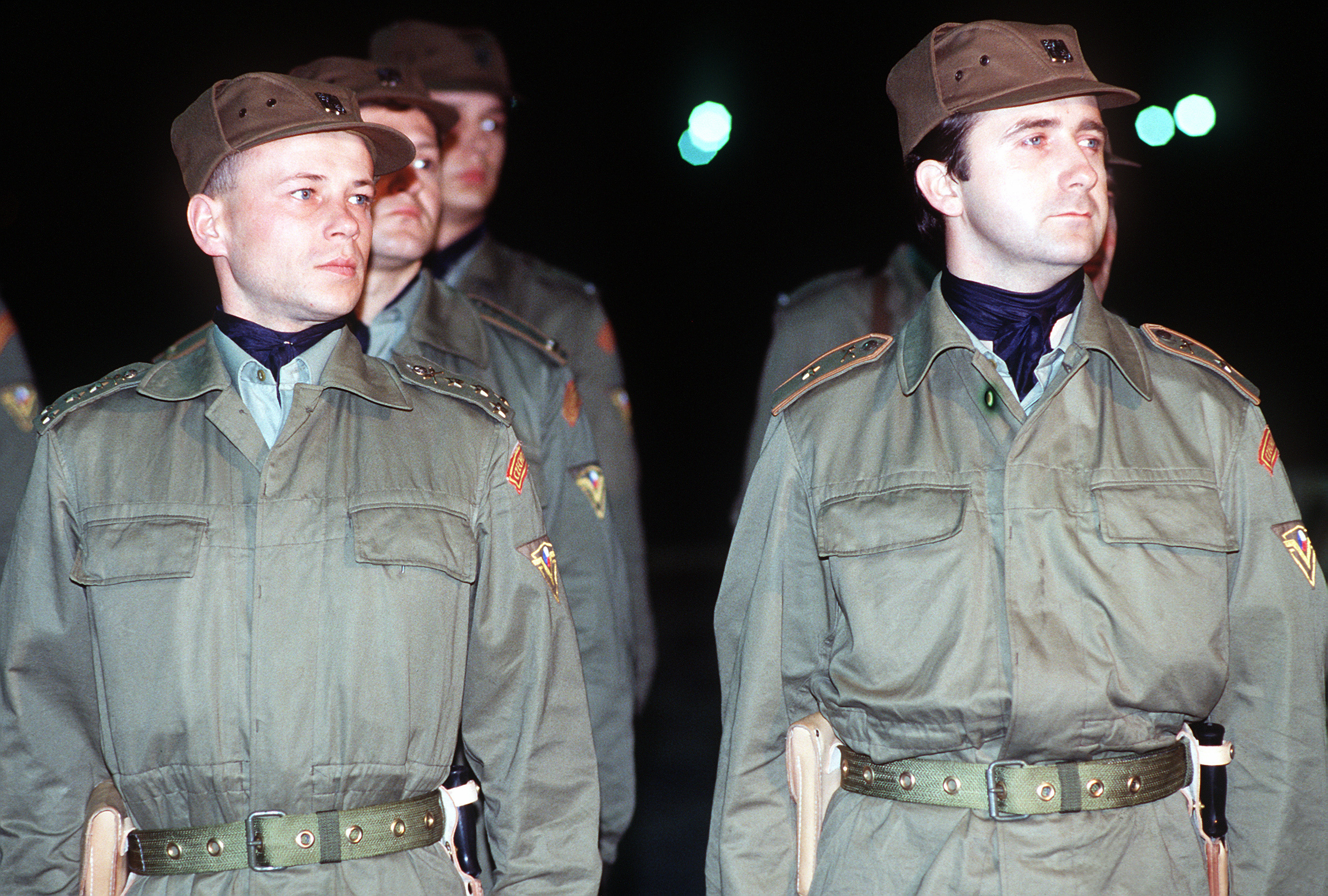
Czechoslovak soldiers stand in formation as they prepare for a visiting dignitary during Operation Desert Shield.

Czechoslovakia sent a force of 200 to take part in Operation Desert Shield and Operation Desert Storm as part of the Coalition of the Gulf War. This operation was the sole military operation carried out by Czechoslovakia during the democratic period prior to its breakup in 1993. It was also the first armed conflict Czechoslovak troops took part in since World War II. The unit deployed to Saudi Arabia specialized in chemical defense and decontamination, a major concern in the Gulf War due to Saddam Hussein's use of mustard and nerve agents in the Iran–Iraq War. Czechoslovak forces were equipped with UAZ-469 all terrain vehicles equipped with chemical detection gear, Tatra T-815 transporters, and a variety of trucks designed for decontamination. The two platoons were headed by Colonel Ján Való. In the wake of the Gulf War, investigations were carried out by the Czech and Slovak government into claims of Gulf War Syndrome amongst returned veterans. Czechoslovak forces recorded the release of toxins such as sarin in Iraqi territory, that were attributed to as the causes of the syndrome. (Note: "Reports of Exposure of Coalition Forces Resulting from the Fallout of the Bombings of Iraqi Chemical, Biological, and Nuclear Facilities (Group II)." Chapter 3, Part 1. Web. 5 Nov. 2009. <Reports of Exposure of Coalition Forces Resulting from the Fallout of the Bombings of Iraqi Chemical, Biological, and Nuclear Facilities (Group II)>)

After the start of the war, about 40 Czechoslovak citizens were detained in Iraq. On 4 December 1990 unofficial Czechoslovak delegation called Mise dobré vůle (in English Mission of good faith) departed to Iraq to negotiate the release of detainees. The mission, designated as unofficial, but led by former defense minister Miroslav Vacek, was successful and returned on 11 December 1990 with 38 detainees. According to a mission member Michael Kocáb, the negotiation was complicated also because of strict statements of some Czechoslovak politicians about Iraq, like the speech of Václav Havel during his 1990 visit in Israel.
