= Holešov barracks incident =

1968 event in the invasion of Czechoslovakia

- Part of Warsaw Pact invasion of Czechoslovakia
Date	21 August 1968 – early September 1968
Location	Holešov, Czechoslovakia 49°19′36″N 17°35′14″E
Result	Military inconclusive

Belligerents
Czechoslovakia	Soviet Union

Commanders and leaders
Lt. Col. Vladimír Košan; Maj. Jiří Dufek; Lt. Col. Miroslav Šedina	

Strength
700 paratroopers	

Casualties and losses
None	None

The Holešov barracks incident was a stand-off confrontation between Soviet and Czechoslovak soldiers during the Warsaw Pact invasion of Czechoslovakia. Czechoslovak paratroopers prevented Soviet soldiers from entering the Czechoslovak People's Army barracks at Holešov.

== Events ==
Around 5 a.m. on 21 August 1968, an elite Soviet tank battalion from Lviv entered Holešov, and in the following hours surrounded the Holešov barracks, home of the 7th Parachute Regiment. The Soviet command considered it extremely important to surround the elite airborne units of the Czechoslovak army before their commanders recovered. However, the Soviets failed to accomplish this.

The Czechoslovak paratroopers, who belonged to the elite of the army and who were trained to carry out diversions, were woken up at three o'clock in the morning by a battle alarm. Led by Lieutenant Colonel Vladimír Košan, the commanders of the barracks decided to defend it. Armed with submachine guns, plastic explosives, and anti-tank missiles, the paratroopers were ready to fight. The first confrontation took place at the barracks gate. When a Soviet soldier at the gate asked: "How come you have weapons?", he received the answer "You have them too!" The paratroopers refused to surrender the barracks; which was the only barracks in the whole of Czechoslovakia that did not fall under Soviet control on August 21.

Later that morning, the paratroopers received a message from the command of the Intelligence Administration of the General Staff (military intelligence) that the leading representatives of the Communist Party of Czechoslovakia had been kidnapped. At the same time, they were given the task of freeing them and bringing them back.

The paratroopers tried to get information about Alexandr Dubček's whereabouts. Reports were inconclusive. According to some, Dubček was supposed to be in a secret location in Czechoslovakia, others spoke of Poland or the area of the former Subcarpathian Rus.

On the night of August 21–22, while the guns of the Soviet tanks were aimed at the barracks, ten armed Czechoslovak paratroopers in civilian clothes slipped away to guard strategic points in the city, and sixty more men with weapons and supplies reached the nearby forests as a preparatory phase for eventual action. The 60-member detachment continued in groups to the village of Přílepy via the shooting range in Dobrotice, where it hid in dugouts. After three days of waiting in the forest, however, the team quietly returned to the barracks.

It became clear that Dubček and other Czechoslovak politicians were already in Moscow, and the plan to rescue them was therefore unrealistic.

In the end, there was no armed conflict at Holešov. The Czechoslovak soldiers managed to convince the Soviets to turn their tanks' guns around to point away from the barracks. After a few days, the Soviets retreated to the surrounding streets and fields. Later, the Soviets anchored by the forest in Přílep, a few kilometers away, where they stayed until October.

== Aftermath ==
The soldiers of the 7th Parachute Regiment were accused of anti-Soviet attitudes and the unit was disbanded in 1969. Some of the soldiers and commanders moved to other units.

Holešov paratroopers—together with other intelligence units from Zbiroh and Litoměřice—had also ensured free radio broadcasting with their radios. All of them were subsequently accused of high treason.

Regimental commander Lieutenant Colonel Vladimír Košan (1927–2010), chief of staff Major Jiří Dufek (1932–2018), and former commander Miroslav Šedina (1930–2010) -- the latter of whom served at the time in the Intelligence Service of the General Staff—were dismissed from the army and politically persecuted.

The communist Czechoslovak government attempted to hide the incident from the public.

The soldiers stayed in touch with each other, and after the fall of the regime, they founded the Holešov Airborne Veterans Club in 1994. In addition to a number of beneficial activities, they annually commemorate the dramatic events of August 1968. In December 2018, Senate President Jaroslav Kubera awarded them a commemorative certificate on behalf of the Senate.

== Cultural impact ==
Several publications mention the 7th Parachute Regiment of special deployment in Holešov. These include, for example, the work of Daga Minkewitzová Paratroopers: 60 years at the head of the army from 2007, the work of František Sovadina the 88th: 77th Parachute Regiment of special deployment Holešov 1961–1969 from 2008 or two works of Jiří Dufek Special purpose units: From Prešov to Holešov 1957 – 1969 from 2011 and VÚ 7374 from 2013.
