= Czechoslovak Army =

1918–1992 combined military forces of Czechoslovakia

- Československá armáda
- Founded: 1918
- Disbanded: 1992
- Service branches: Czechoslovak Ground Forces; Czechoslovak Naval Forces; Czechoslovak Air Force; Czechoslovak State Air Defense
- Headquarters: Prague, Czechoslovakia

Leadership
- President of Czechoslovakia: Tomáš Masaryk (first); Václav Havel (last)
- Minister of National Defence: Václav Klofáč (first); Imrich Andrejčák (last)
- Chief of the General Staff: Maurice Pellé (first); Karel Pezl (last)

Personnel
- Military age: 18
- Conscription: Yes
- Active personnel: 201,000 (1987)
- Deployed personnel: North Korea (1952–1953); Coalition (1990–1991)

Industry
- Foreign suppliers: France; United Kingdom; United States; Soviet Union

Related articles
- History: Polish–Czechoslovak War; Hungarian–Czechoslovak War; World War II; Korean War; Gulf War
- Ranks: Czechoslovakian military ranks

The Czechoslovak Army (Czechoslovak: Československá armáda) and later the Czechoslovak People's Army was the name of the armed forces of Czechoslovakia. It was established in 1918 following Czechoslovakia's declaration of independence from Austria-Hungary.

== History ==
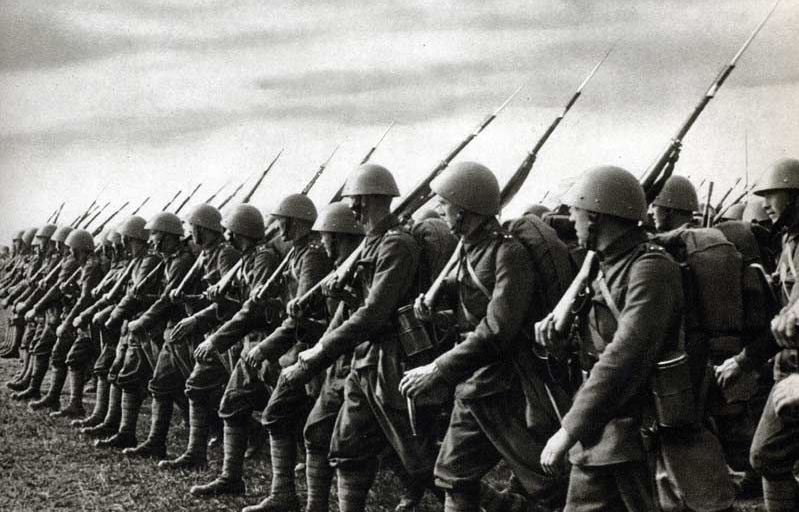
Czechoslovak infantrymen armed with vz. 24 rifles in the 1930s.

In the first week after the declaration of independence, the Army of the new First Czechoslovak Republic consisted mainly of Czech and Slovak units of the Austro-Hungarian Army. It later incorporated members of the Czechoslovak Legion that fought alongside the Entente on the Italian and Western Fronts of World War I. The Czechoslovak Army took part in the brief Polish-Czechoslovak War, in which Czechoslovakia annexed the Trans-Olza region from the Second Polish Republic. It also fought a border war with Hungary for control and borders of Slovakia. The Army was modeled after the Austro-Hungarian Army, with the influence of a French military mission. Its initial officers were both former Austro-Hungarian and Legion officers who decided to stay in the active service. The first chief of the Army Staff was French General Maurice Pellé.

In the Interwar period, the force was fairly modern by contemporary standards, with the core of being formed by four fast divisions equipped in the late 1930s with LT vz. 35 tanks, as well as working with an extensive system of border fortifications. Partly mobilized after the German-Austrian Anschluss, and fully mobilized at the time of the Munich Conference, the force did not take part in any organized defense of the country against the invading Germans, due to the international isolation of Czechoslovakia.

The army was disbanded following the German takeover of Czechoslovakia in 1939. During World War II, the Czechoslovak Army was recreated in exile, first in the form of the new Czechoslovak Legion fighting alongside Poland during the invasion of Poland, and then in the form of forces loyal to the London-based Czechoslovak government-in-exile. Czechoslovak formations were also formed on the Eastern Front; the 1st Czechoslovak Army Corps in the Soviet Union served alongside the Red Army, and the First Czechoslovak Army in Slovakia claimed the legacy of the Czechoslovak forces during the Slovak National Uprising.

After the war, Czechoslovak units fighting alongside the Allies returned to Czechoslovakia and formed the core of the new, recreated Czechoslovak Army. However, with the Communist takeover of Czechoslovakia, it was Sovietised and in 1954 was formally renamed the Czechoslovak People's Army.

The army of Czechoslovakia returned to its former name in 1990, following the Velvet Revolution. In December 1990, the National Assembly voted to deploy 200 Chemical Unit soldiers to Saudi Arabia as part of the U.S.-led coalition during Operation Desert Shield. They would subsequently serve under Saudi command in the Gulf War against Ba’athist Iraq, becoming some of the first troops to enter Kuwait. A Czechoslovak battalion would also serve in Serbian Krajina as United Nations Protection Force (UNPROFOR) peacekeepers during the Croatian War of Independence.

In 1993, following the dissolution of Czechoslovakia, the Czechoslovak Army was disbanded and split into the present-day Army of the Czech Republic and the Slovak Armed Forces. The Czechoslovak battalion serving in UNPROFOR continued operating for three more months under joint Czech-Slovak command before its replacement by a Czech battalion.

== See also ==
- Gendarmerie (Czechoslovakia)
- War College (Prague)
