= Ludvík Krejčí =

Czechoslovak army general (1890-1972)

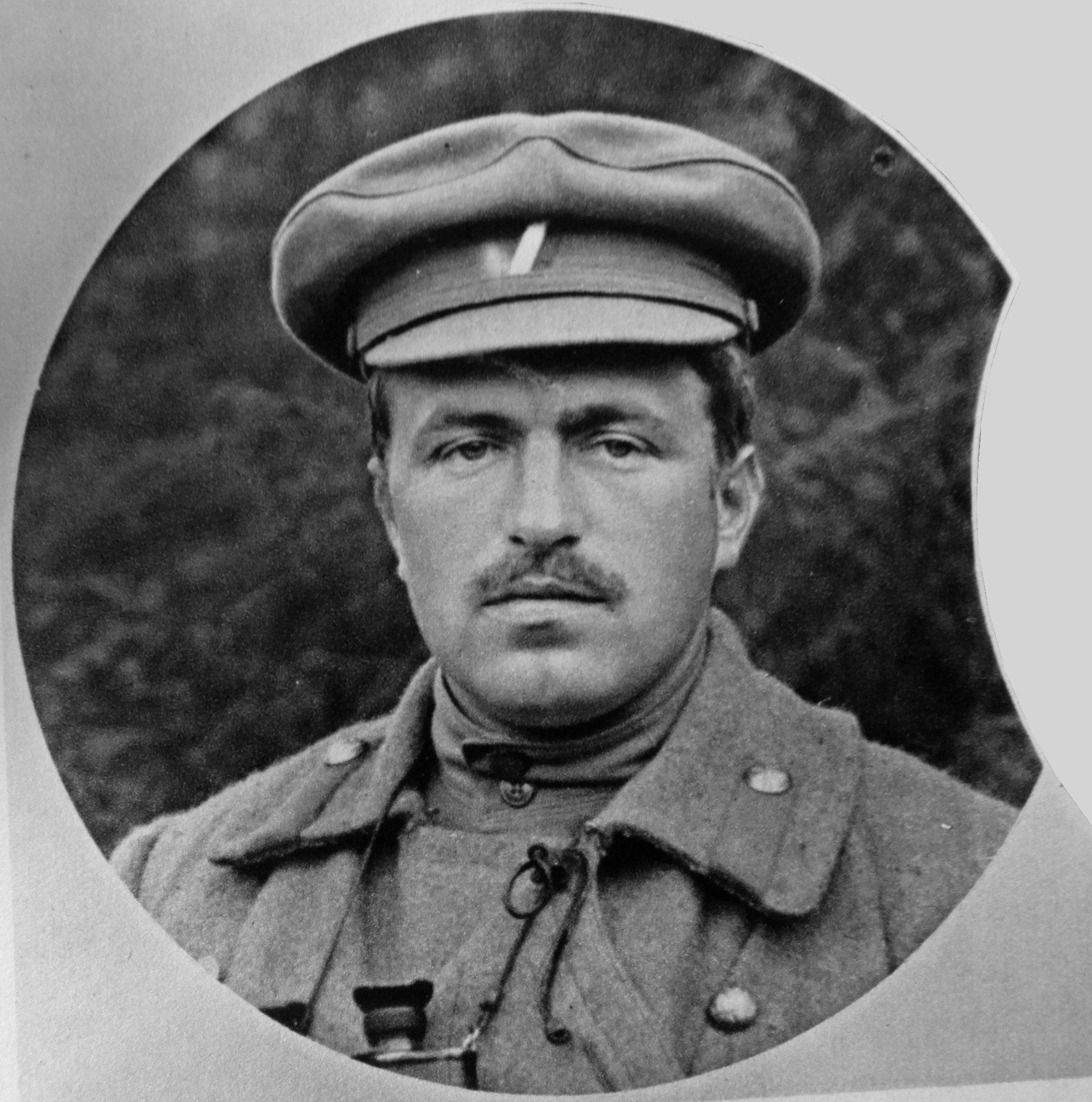
- Ludvík Krejčí as a colonel and Commander of the Czechoslovak II division in Czechoslovak legions in Russia in around 1918–1920
- Born: 17 August 1890; Brno, Bohemia, Austria-Hungary
- Died: 9 February 1972 (aged 81); Ústí nad Orlicí, Pardubice Region, Czechoslovakia
- Military career
- Allegiance: Austria-Hungary; Czechoslovak Legion; Czechoslovakia
- Branch: Austro-Hungarian Army; Czechoslovak Army
- Service years: 1914–1939
- Rank: General
- Commands: 8th Regiment in Brno; 4th Bosnian Regiment; 6th Rifle Regiment
- Conflicts: World War I Russian Civil War; Sudeten German uprising

Ludvík Krejčí (17 August 1890 – 9 February 1972) was a Czechoslovak army general and legionary of the First World War.

== Biography ==
=== Early life and World War I ===
He was born on 17 August 1890 in Brno-Tuřany, near Brno, as the youngest of eight children in a peasant family. He graduated from the Vyškov grammar school and was accepted to the Higher Forestry School in Písek. After graduating, he was drafted into full-time military service in 1910 as a one-year volunteer with the 8th Regiment in Brno. In 1911 he became a forest assistant of the state forests in Nuštar.

He was transferred to the reserve of the 4th Regiment before the Austrian mobilization on 28 July 1914 and fought with it in Serbia, Montenegro, and Albania. In May 1916, he was briefly transferred with the battalion as company commander to Italy and then to Romania. There, in trench warfare on 17 May 1917 he was captured at Odobești near Focșani.

=== Russian Civil War ===
In June he enlisted in the Czechoslovak Legion and on 20 July 1917 he was enrolled in an officer's course in Borispol. He was awarded the rank of staff captain and was assigned as an officer to the 6th Haná Rifle Regiment of the Czechoslovak Legions in Russia.

After the failure of the Kerensky Offensive, the Imperial Russian army disintegrated and the Czechoslovak legion retreated with it. At the Battle of Bakhmach on 9 March 1918, his unit detained the advancing German front at the Bakhmach railway junction in Ukraine, thus enabling the evacuation of the first and second divisions of retreating legionnaires to the Trans-Siberian Highway. He took part in other retreat battles from Ukraine to Siberia, distinguished himself in Marjanovka and the Kungura front. After Radola Gajda joined the service of the White Guards (he became commander of Kolchak's troops), he took over in 1919 in the rank of colonel commander of the 2nd Rifle Division, which covered the last part of the transports to Vladivostok from the attacks of the Red Army. In April 1920 he left Russia and returned to his homeland with the 6th Rifle Regiment on the ship President Grant, which he took by train on 20 June 1920.

=== Interwar period ===
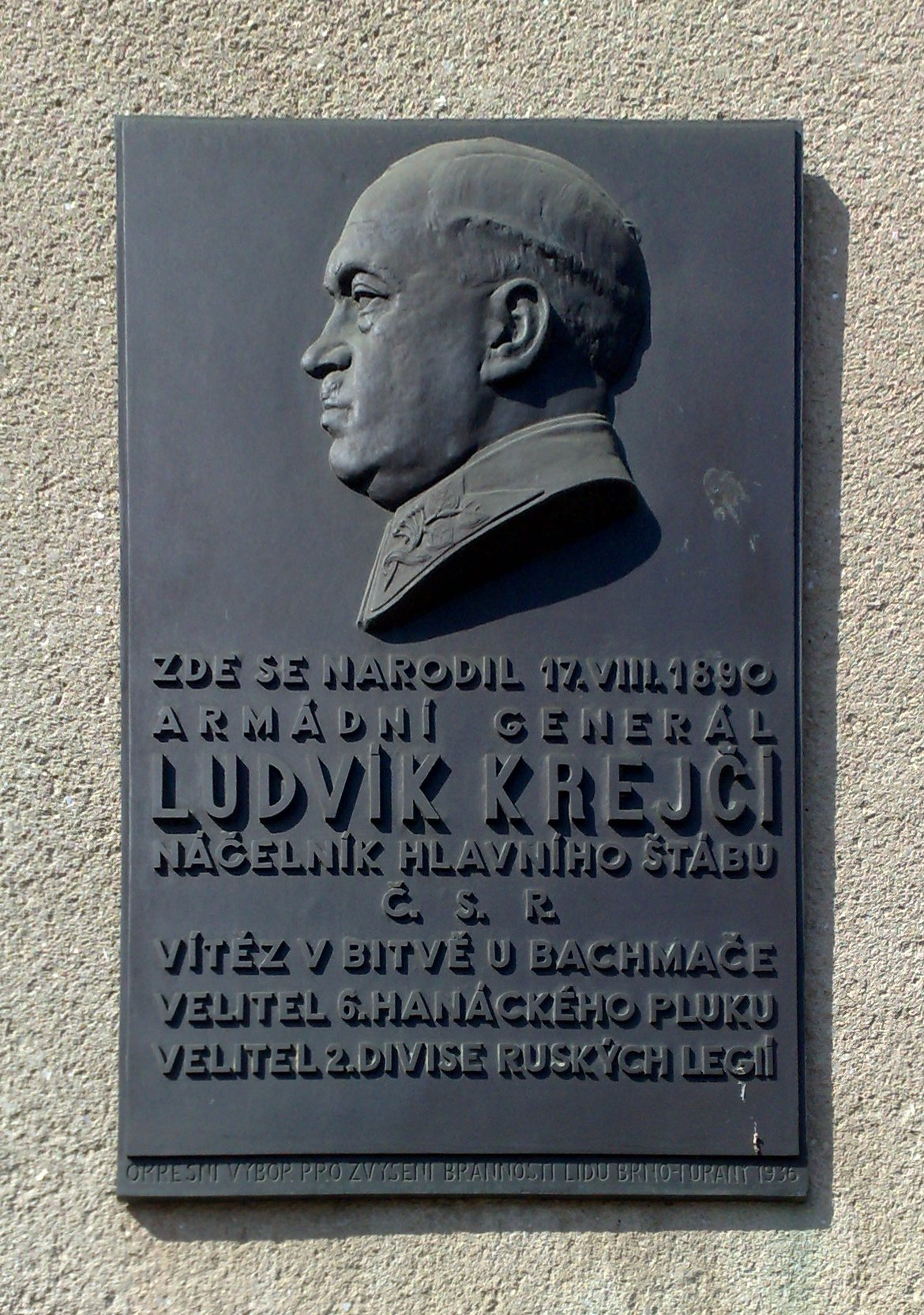
Memorial plaque at the birth house in Brno-Tuřany, Tuřanské nám. 31 (Placed from 1936 – 1939, 1996 – present)

In July 1920, he was already entrusted with the command of the 6th Infantry Division, based in Brno, in the rank of colonel. In 1923 he was promoted to brigadier general. In August the same year he was sent to the Paris War College. In 1925, after returning to his homeland, he was commissioned to command the 4th Division in Hradec Králové. In May 1928 he was promoted to divisionary general.

In January 1927 he married Maria Luxová, they had two daughters Marie (1930, later married Žižková and Jarmila (1932). In December 1932 he was appointed Provincial Military Commander in Košice.

After Hitler's victory in the 1932 German presidential election as Reich Chancellor in 1933, and the failure of the 1932 Geneva Disarmament Conference, it was necessary to prepare the army for a possible military conflict. Therefore, on 30 November 1933, Krejčí was appointed interim and a month later definitive chief of staff of the armed forces . This happened at the direct request of President Masaryk, when General Prchal could not be enforced. He replaced the dismissed Jan Syrový in his highest position, to whom he supported Edvard Beneš and the French military mission established a substitute post of inspector general. Later, after Masaryk's abdication of the presidency, disputes arose over the competencies of the chief and the inspector, which, however, he placed as a matter of trust in his person, and Syrový had to resign in a representative position. In 1934, at the age of 44, he was promoted to army general.

He enforced key changes in the army in changes in the command structure, military strategy (cover and maneuvering component), retirement of deserving officers, technological modernization of the army (motorization and mechanization, air force, tanks), extension of full-time service, increase of army budget, and the introduction of the VI mobilization plan. On 20 March 1935 the Directorate of Fortification Works was established and he himself was appointed Chairman of the Fortification Council, which had the function of the governing body for the construction of permanent fortifications in Czechoslovakia.

=== Sudeten German uprising ===
As the highest-ranking soldier, from 1 March 1938 to September 1938, he pushed for an increase in the number of army in peacetime by continuously calling up midfielders for training. After the occupation of Austria on 12 March 1938, the mobilization plan VI modified by the General Staff was completed in April 1938 while the German Wehrmacht was not able to make a similar adjustment until September 1938. After intelligence announced the concentration of German troops in Saxony, northern Austria and southern Silesia, after consultation with the President and the government, one year of an advance for an extraordinary exercise was called, and from 22 May to 13 June 1938 a border guard was declared to ensure the protection of the republic until a possible general mobilization. In July 1938, a new mobilization plan VII came into force, which already envisaged mobilization in western Bohemia and, after a concentrated attack by the Wehrmacht, retreat to the Bohemian-Moravian Highlands.

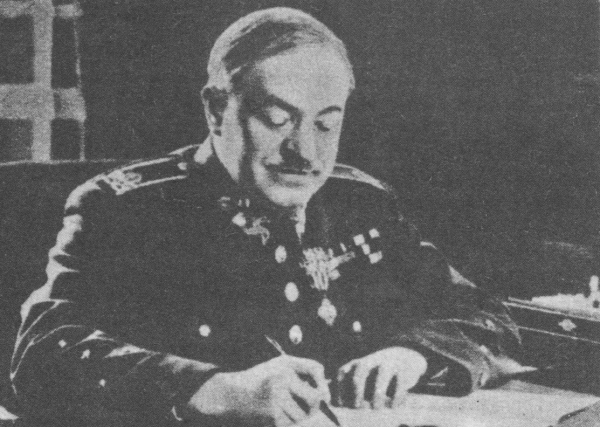
Ludvík Krejčí in 1938

At the beginning of September 1938, he addressed a memorandum to politicians, warning against concessions to Nazi Germany and drawing attention to the army's readiness to fight. From 12 September 1938, the staff established continuous operation, including mobilization bodies. On the border, from 12 and 13 September, the Czechoslovak government declared martial law in response to an armed uprising organized by the Sudetendeutsche Partei, which had to be suppressed by the army's emergency and, eventually, regular units.

After fears that this military intervention would not become a pretext for Nazi Germany's attack, he again called on the government and the president to take defensive measures. They only agreed to call part of the midfielders to a special exercise. The combat readiness of heavy and seclight fortifications was also declared.

During the other two memoranda on the seriousness of the situation, dated at the end of September, were addressed to the public and to politicians. On 17 September 1938 he asked President Edvard Beneš to immediately call two years of advanced and subsequent mobilization, which was, however, rejected. He therefore submitted to the president his resignation, which was also rejected, but the requirement to call one year was fulfilled. Through French General Gamelin, he asked France to support the mobilization proposal. However, the governments of the United Kingdom and France again firmly rejected Czechoslovak mobilization.

On 21 September Krejčí again demanded the announcement of the mobilization, again unsuccessfully. On 21 September 1938 the Czechoslovak government adopted a British-French ultimatum on concessions at the border, which it rejected the day before. However, Konrad Henlein did not accept these concessions on Hitler's orders and described them as no longer sufficient. The government resigned and a new one was appointed, headed by General Syrovy.

Krejčí made another request for mobilization at a meeting with the president against the concentrated German army on 21 September, and again Beneš was not heard. It was not until 22 September 1938 that he succeeded in declaring full border cover and then, on 23 September 1938, a general mobilization, when he was appointed commander-in-chief of the armed forces (ie the mobilized army) by President Edvard Beneš, thus de facto becoming generalissimo. The next day, the Main Headquarters began to move through Klánovice, where an order was issued to deploy support forces in defensive positions according to the expected direction of the main attack at Jindřichův Hradec, Liberec. On the evening of 26 September 1938 the staff arrived in Račice near Vyškov and its surroundings. The mobilization was undisturbed and successfully completed and the army was ready for defense.

An agreement on the withdrawal of the borderland from Germany was adopted in Munich on the night of 29 September and delivered, as automatically accepted, to the Czechoslovak government. On the morning of 30 September 1938 he was called by the president to Prague, where, together with Generals Vojtěch Luža, Sergei Wojciechowski and Lev Prchala, they defended the necessity, ability and willingness of the Czechoslovak Army to defend even the lone republic. Edvard Beneš wrote about the meeting in his memoirs:

It was a very moving conversation. I saw tears in the eyes of some generals and heard words of pleas, warnings and threats from their mouths. They did not go beyond the set limit in their attitude of the generals to the commander-in-chief; but these pleas and warnings were very emphatic.

At the beginning of October, he was at the forefront of pressure on politicians in favor of military defense, as he was convinced of the readiness and determination of the army. He took part in platonic attempts at a possible military takeover of the government, subsequently changed his mind and rejected other attempts by the generals.

After the adoption of the Munich Agreement, the army began to demobilize in mid-October 1938 under his command and return to a state of peace. A new mobilization plan, reduction of the army and further partial modernization of the army were prepared, and from 5 to 12 December 1938 the border cover was gradually abolished. On 20 December 1938 he was removed from the post of commander-in-chief of the operating armies. On 3 February 1939 the military readiness was abolished. At the urging of the Nazis, on 1 March 1939 he was removed from the post of Chief of the General Staff and sent on "sick leave".

=== Prisoner of the Protectorate ===
After the beginning of the German occupation of Czechoslovakia in March 1939, he lived in Prague, later he was forced to move to his wife's birthplace in Jablonné nad Orlicí. His two attempts to leave the republic were unsuccessful. However, he was arrested by the Gestapo on 14 October 1941 and, after interrogations in Prague, transferred to the Terezín concentration camp. In July 1942 he was unexpectedly released by the Gestapo. In October 1942 and August 1943, K.H. Frank tried to abuse his release propagandistically, which Krejčí refused. Despite constant monitoring, he supported funds with a resistance group led by Jaroslav Kvapil.

=== Later life and death ===
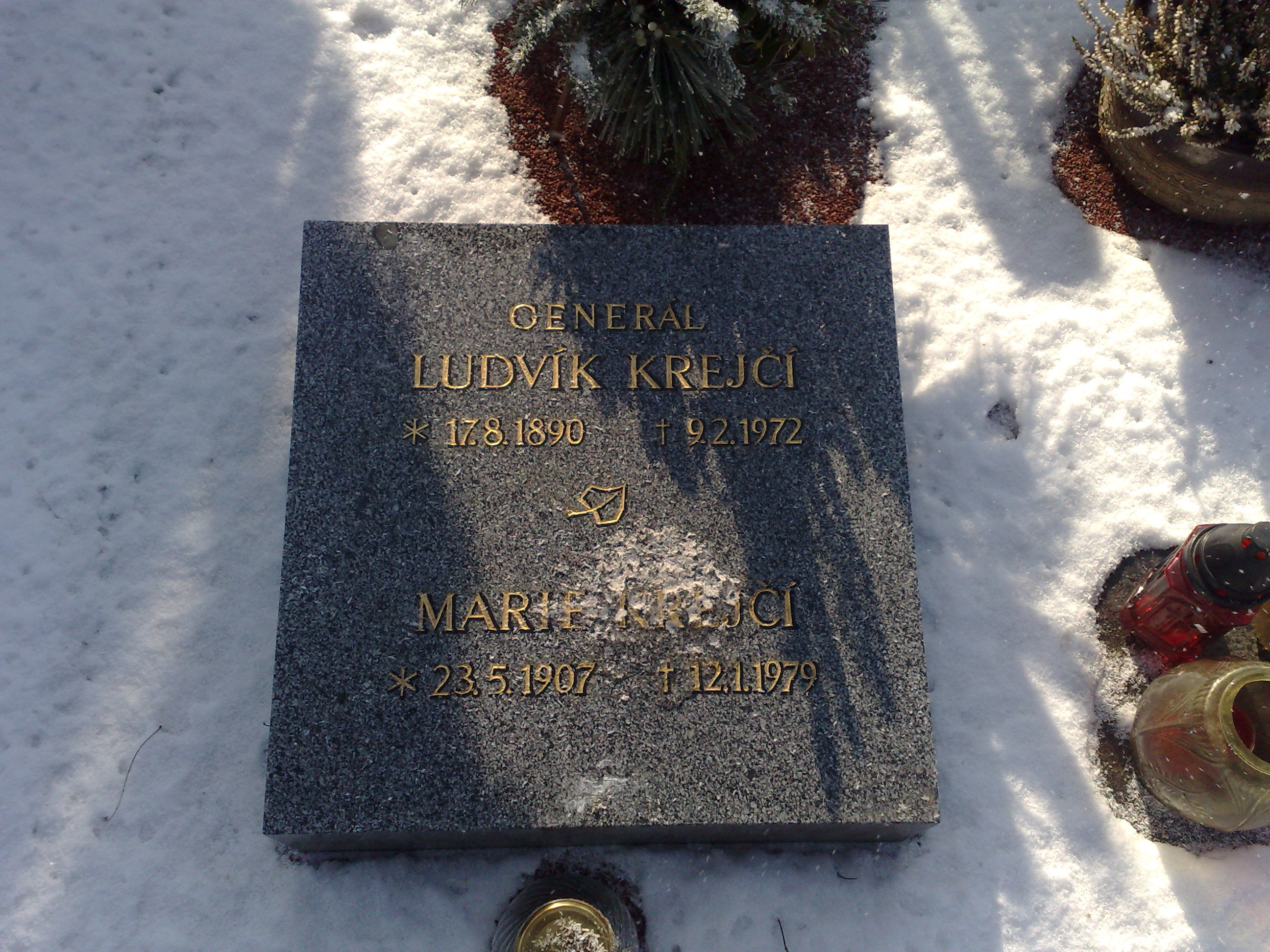
Ludvík Krejčí's grave in Brno-Tuřany in 2011

After liberation, he enlisted in the army at the age of 57. It was not until the beginning of 1947 that he was re-admitted, but on 1 February 1947 he was retired. After the communist coup, he was demoted to a soldier in July 1950 and in May 1953 his pension was withdrawn. He worked as an auxiliary worker in a nationalized button factory in Jablonné nad Orlicí, formerly belonging to his wife's family. After the intervention of Ivan Konev, he was awarded a partial pension in 1969. He died as a simple soldier on 9 February 1972 in the Ústí nad Orlicí Hospital and was buried in his native town of Brno-Tuřany with legionary honors.

=== Legacy ===
The rank of army general was not returned to him posthumously until 1990. In 1997 he was also awarded for services to the resistance. In 1998, he was nominated for an award by the Order of the White Lion in memoriam, but the relevant commission rejected this proposal at the time.

In 1999, the "Brno Legionnaire" edition published the first publication about this general, prepared at the request of the family according to available materials, entitled " Ludvík Krejčí, Tuřanský generál". The author of this publication, M. A. Fryščok, chose the name as a reminder of the general's patriotism, manifested in the critical moments of mobilization at the end of September 1938, when the general moved from the headquarters in Račice near Vyškov to Tuřany at night. Here he visited the grave of his parents and then visited his three brothers and said to their hearts: "If I fell, please remember, no Zizkov, I want to be buried in Turany."

In 2012, he was awarded the Václav Benda Prize (in memoriam). On 28 October 2017 the President of the Republic, Miloš Zeman, in memoriam bestowed on him the Order of the White Lion of the 1st Class Military Group for extraordinary merits for the defense and security of the state.

== Awards ==
=== National awards ===
- Medal of Jan Žižka of Trocnov (1918)
- Order of the Falcon, with swords (1919)
- Czechoslovak War Cross 1918 (1920)
- Czechoslovak Medal of Victory (1922)
- Czechoslovak Revolutionary Medal (1922)
- Commemorative medal of the 6th Haná Rifle Regiment (1948)
- Bachmac Commemorative Medal (1948)
- Order of the White Lion, 1st Class Military Group, in memoriam (2017)

=== Foreign awards ===
- Austria-Hungary: Military Merit Medal, Bronze (1915)
- Austria-Hungary: Military Merit Medal, Silver (1916)
- Austria-Hungary: Military Merit Cross, Iron (1916)
- France: Croix de guerre 1914–1918 (1919)
- France: Legion of Honour, V. class - knight (1920)
- France: Legion of Honour, IV. class - officer (1928)
- France: Legion of Honour, II. class - Grand Officer (1934)
- Greece: Order of George I, I. class - Grand Cross (1936)
- Italy: Order of the Crown of Italy, III. class - commander (1923)
- Romania: Order of the Crown, III Class (1928)
- Romania: Order of the Star of Romania, 1st class with swords (1934)
- Russia: Order of Saint Vladimir (1918)
- United Kingdom: Distinguished Service Order (1919)
- Yugoslavia: Order of the Yugoslav Crown, 1st Class (1935)
