= Vz.53 anti-aircraft gun =

Vz.53 12.7 mm
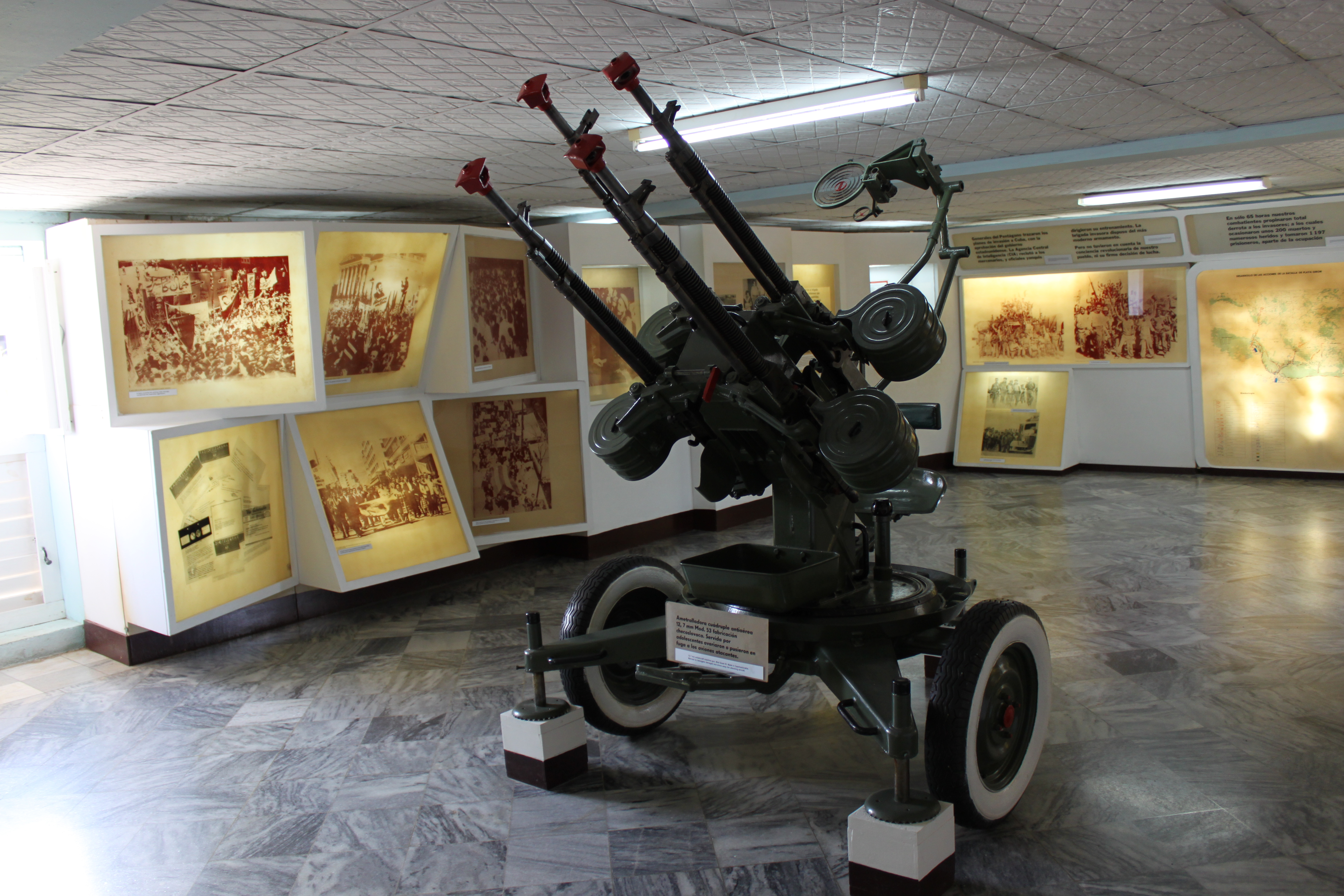
- A Vz.53 In a Cuban museum
- Type: Anti-aircraft gun
- Place of origin: Czechoslovakia

Service history
- In service: 1953 onwards
- Used by: See § Users
- Wars: Bay of Pigs Invasion; Vietnam War; Laotian Civil War; Cambodian Civil War; Cambodian–Vietnamese War; Six-Day War; Yom Kippur War; Angolan Civil War; Soviet-Afghan War; Lebanese Civil War; Operation Urgent Fury; Nicaraguan Revolution

Production history
- Designer: Vasiliy Gavrilovich Grabin
- Designed: 1953
- Produced: 1953 – late 1950s

Specifications
- Mass: 558 kg
- Crew: 4
- Shell: 12.7×108mm
- Action: Gas operated, flapper locking
- Carriage: Two wheels, folded upwards in the firing position
- Traverse: 360°
- Muzzle velocity: 850 metres per second (2,800 ft/s)
- Effective firing range: 1,500 m
- Maximum firing range: 2,500 m (2,700 yd)
- Feed system: 100-round belts in drums (per gun)

The Vz.53 (Also widely known as the M53 in Western sources) is an anti-aircraft weapon system produced in Czechoslovakia during the 1950s. It combines four Vz.38/46 (DShK) 12.7 mm machineguns on a wheeled mount with a 360° traverse. Its full Czech designation was 12,7 mm protiletadlový čtyřkulomet vz.53 (12.7 mm anti-aircraft quad machinegun model 53).

== History ==
Following World War II, the Czechoslovak military was equipped with a wide mixture of anti-aircraft weapons, including many German weapons such as the Flakvierling 38, a quad-barreled 2 cm weapon. However, these weapons use proprietary ammunition, production of which had ceased after Germany's surrender. The Czechoslovak People's Army was already producing the Vz38/46, a copy of the Soviet DShKM 12.7 mm machinegun, and decided to create a light quad-mount anti-aircraft carriage mounting these guns to serve as a low-level air defense weapon. The resulting system was designated Vz.53 and entered service in 1953. The Vz.53 complemented the towed 30mm Vz.53/59 and its self-propelled version, the M53/59 Praga, which were not effective at extremely close ranges.

The Vz.53 was similar to the Soviet ZPU-4, but the Vz.53's lighter 12.7 mm cartridge had a lower effective range and did less damage than the Soviet 14.5 mm weapon. However, the Vz.53 was approximately three times lighter than the ZPU-4. Regardless, both weapons were quickly rendered obsolescent as super-sonic jet fighters began to enter service in NATO countries. The Vz.53 was mostly withdrawn from Czech service by the early 1960s, but was not fully replaced until the 9K32 Strela-2 became available in the early 1970s.

== Combat history ==
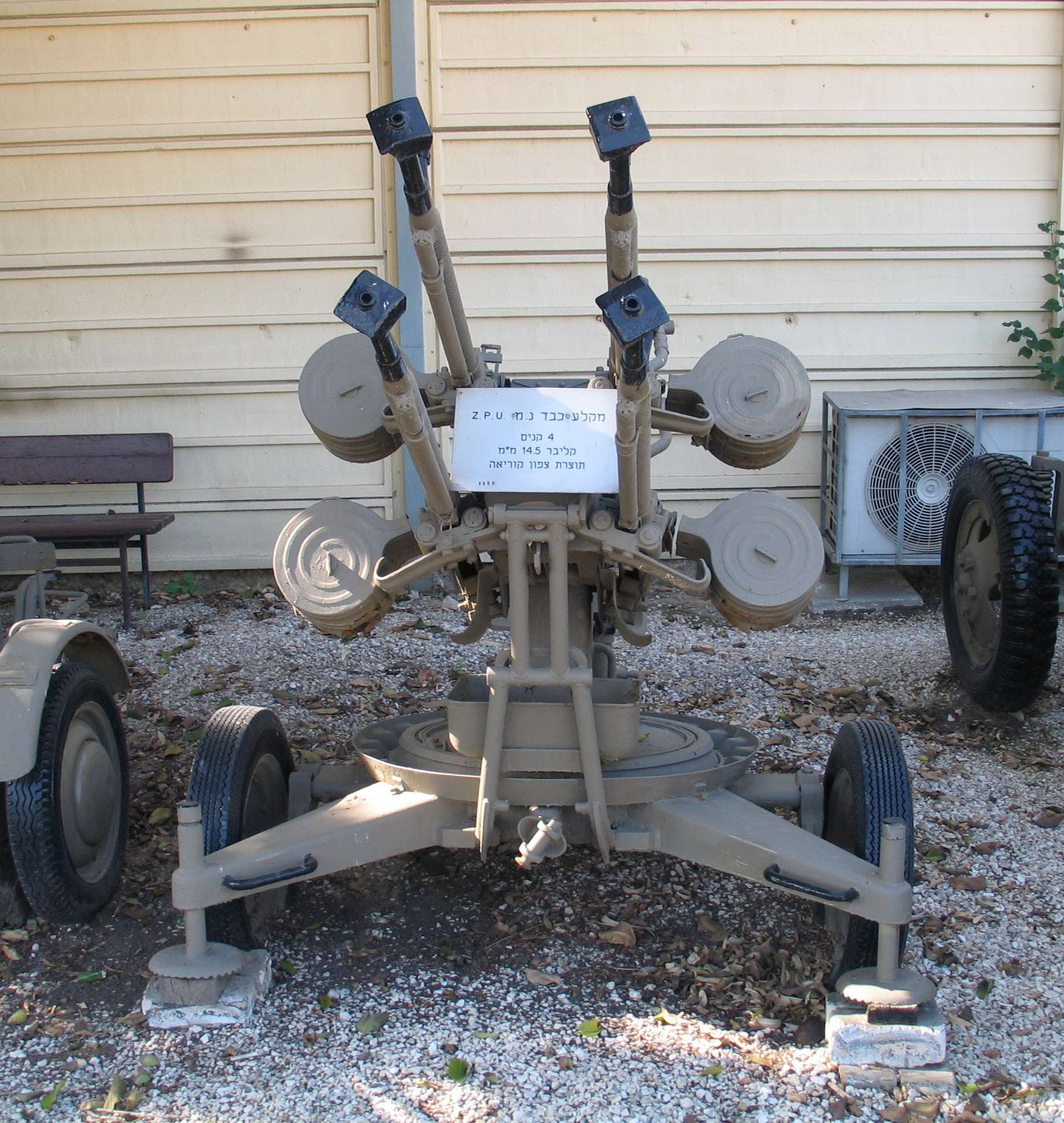
An Israeli-captured Vz.53/M53 on display (Mislabeled as a ZPU 4)

Many Vz.53s were sold abroad, or given as aid to Soviet client states as part of the Cold War. Cuba was one of the largest operators of the weapon, using several during the Bay of Pigs invasion where they were reportedly responsible for shooting down a Douglas A-26 Invader bomber., Cuba later brought these to Angola and provided some to the Angolan MPLA to be used during the Angolan Civil War. Cuba used M53s until the 1990s.

Cuba also later provided at least half a dozen M53s to Grenada where they were used against US forces during Operation Urgent Fury in 1983. It is suspected that an M53 was responsible for shooting down a UH-60 Blackhawk during this operation, the first UH-60 ever to be shot down. Some were also used during the Nicaraguan Revolution, provided by Cuba.

M53s were also sold to Egypt as part of the Egyptian–Czechoslovak arms deal in 1955, and were used during the Suez Crisis. Some were also supplied to Iraq and Syria. the Arab nations used large numbers of M53s during the Six-Day War and Yom-Kippur War, where many were captured by Israel.

A small number of M53s were provided to North Vietnam and used during the Vietnam War

As of 2021, the Vz.53/M53 is not known to be service anywhere in the world, though some may be in storage in Cuba.

== Users ==
- Cuba
- Czechoslovakia
- Grenada
- Egypt
- Vietnam

== Gallery ==
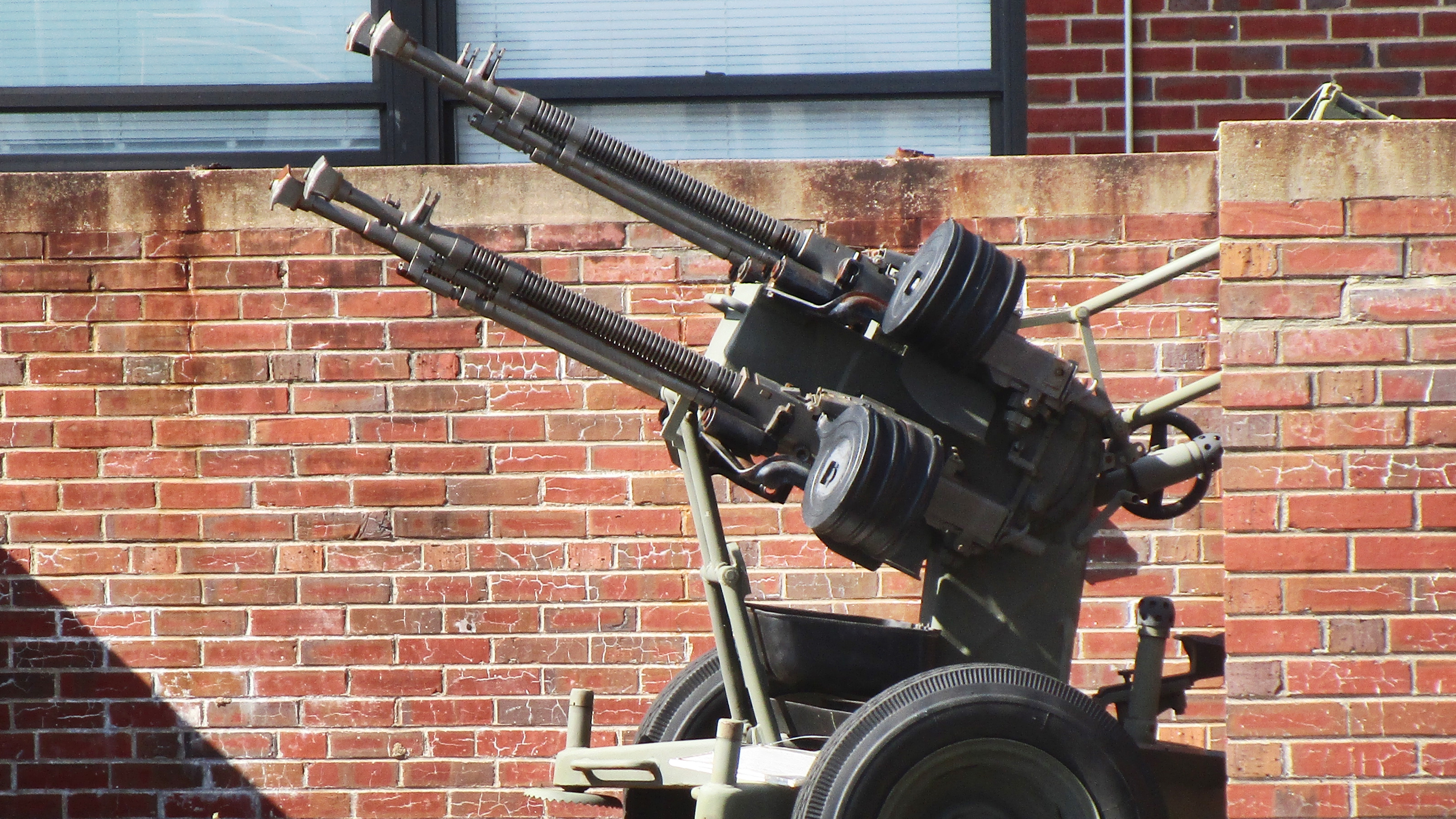

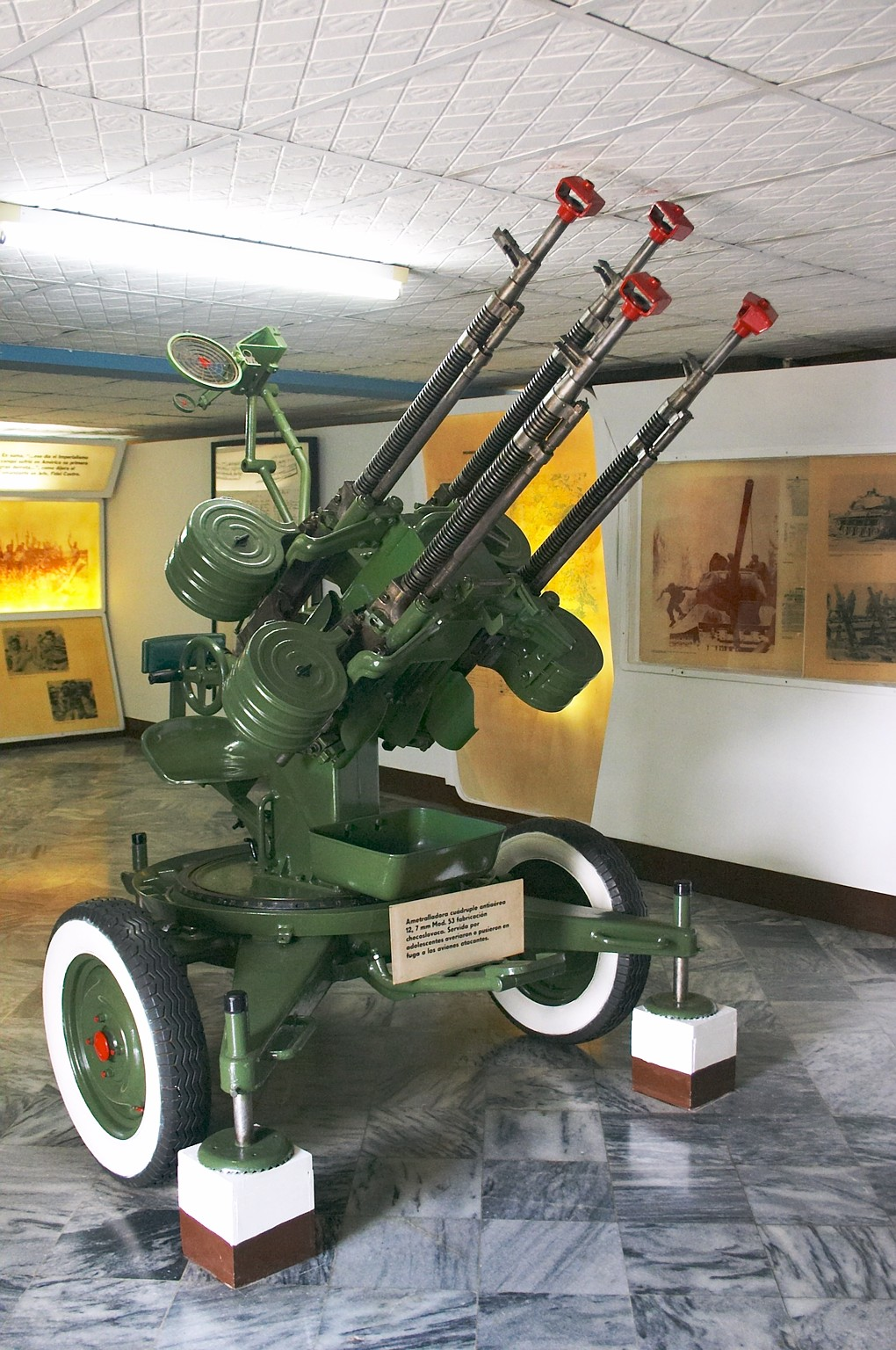

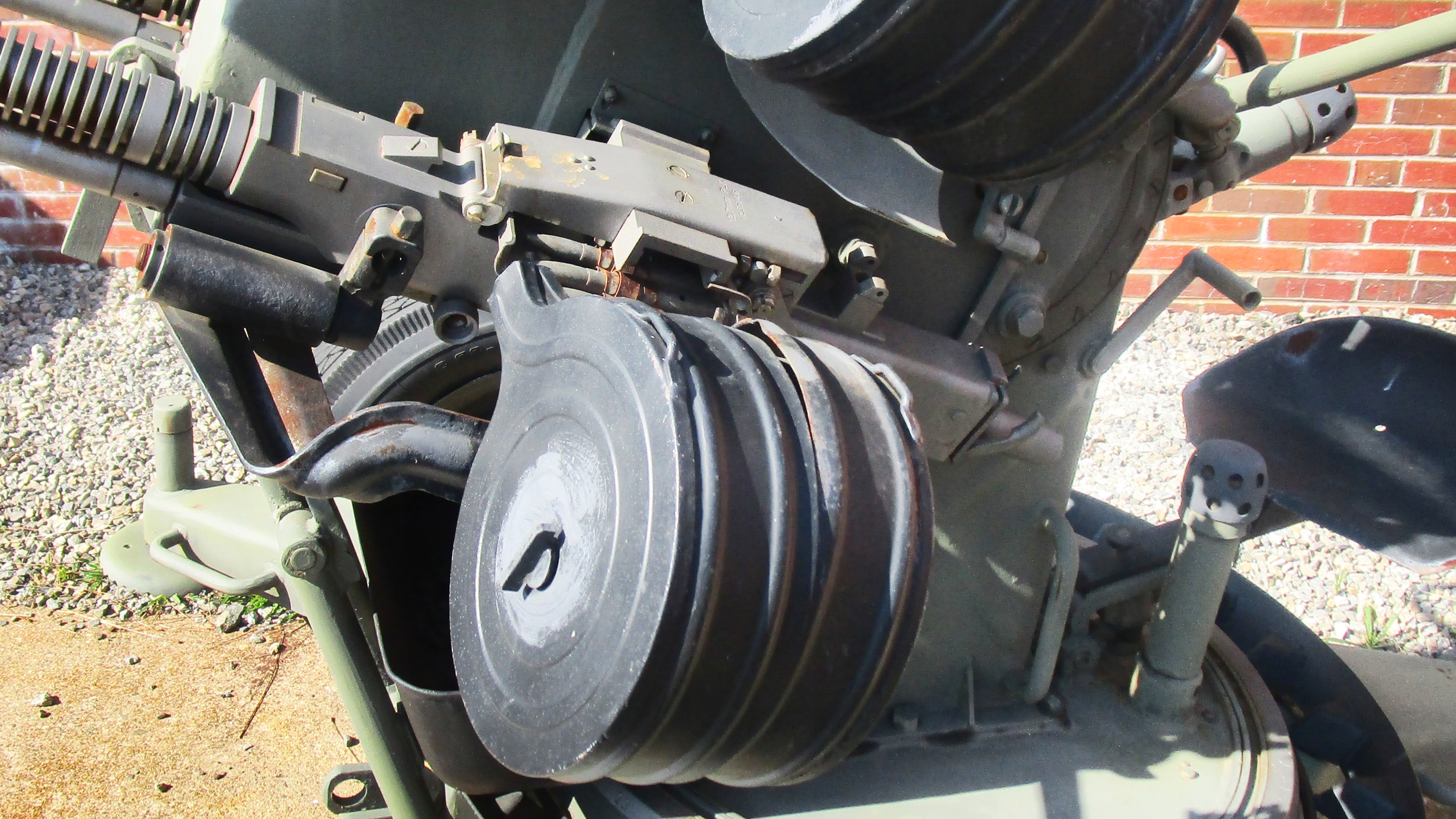

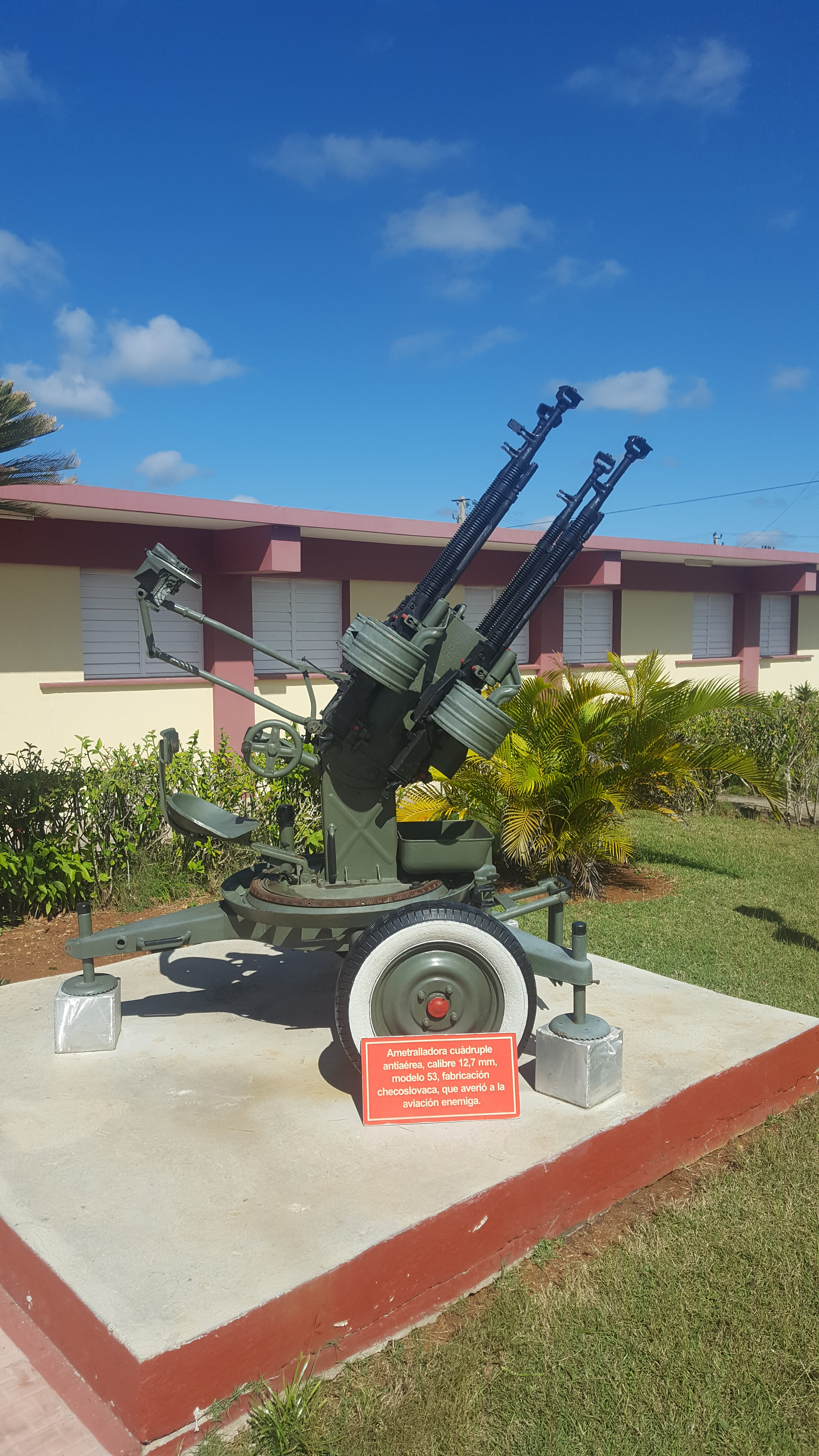

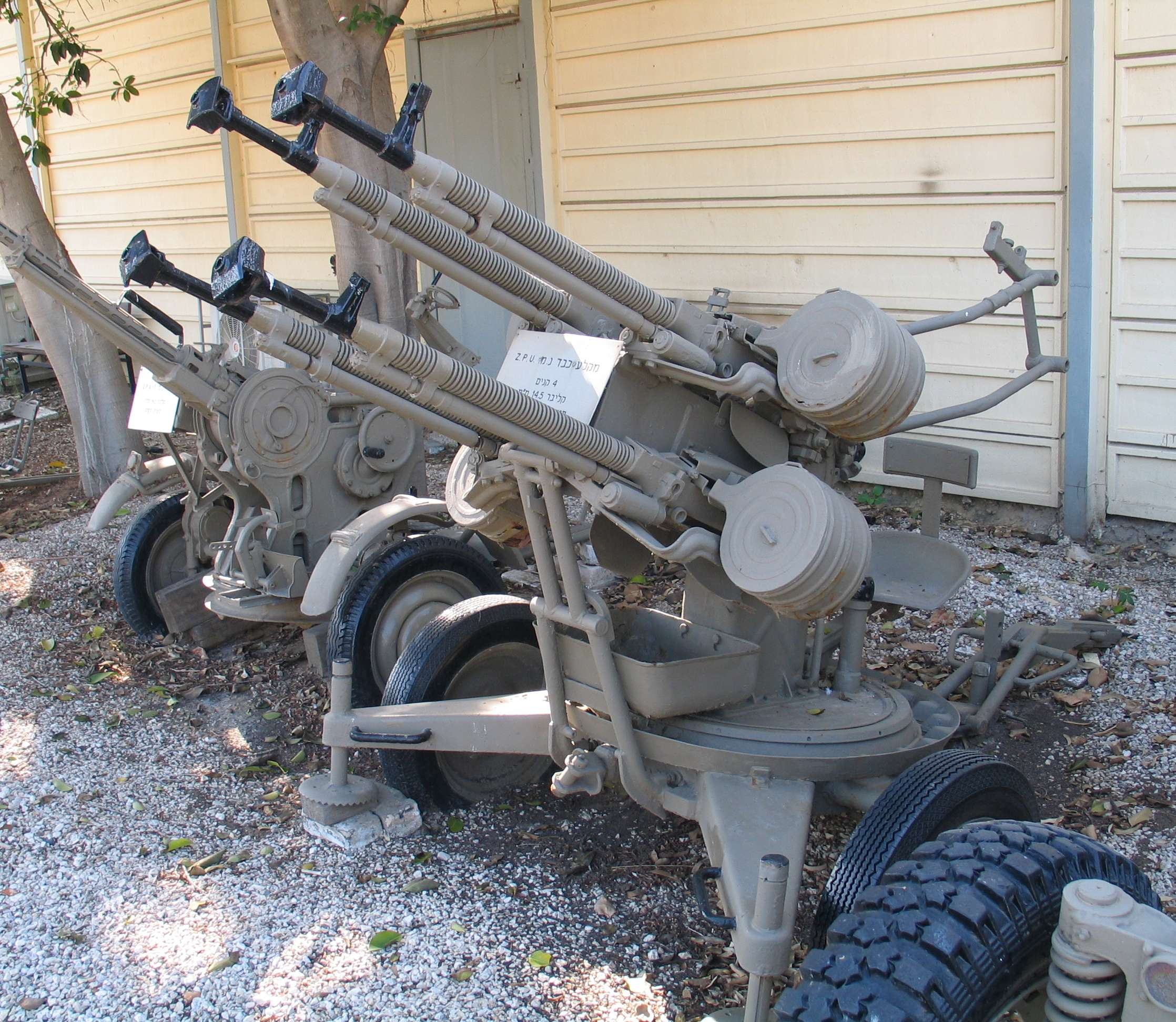
