= Karel Rusov =

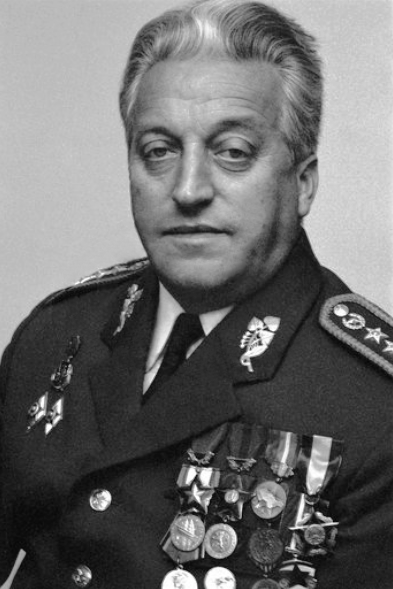
Official portrait.

Colonel General Karel Rusov (born Karel Russwurm; 21 November 1924 – 30 April 2013) was a Czech and Czechoslovak general who served as the Chief of the General Staff of the Czechoslovak People's Army from 19 April 1968 – 26 November 1979, the longest to serve in that position at a little over 11 1/2 years. He was also a prominent politician of the Communist Party of Czechoslovakia and a member of the Chamber of People of the Federal Assembly during the period of Normalization. From 1979 to 1989, he was as First Deputy Minister of National Defence to Generals Martin Dzúr and Milán Václavík. He retired from active service in 1990.
