= Czechoslovak military mission in Korea (1952–1956) =

Czechoslovak Military Mission in Korea (1952–1956) included a military hospital operating in the Korean War on the side of North Korea.

== History ==
=== Mission ===
The hospital began its operations in April 1952, two months after the political secretariat of the Central Committee of the Communist Party made a decision to establish it. There were 29 doctors, nurses and paramedics at the hospital. The commander was MUDr. Josef Barták. The bed capacity consisted of 2000 beds for 500 patients. At first it was nased in the village of Sogam. It was relocated to the village of Ousara near Chichon in April 1953.Most of the staff was replaced at the time including its commander. MUDr. Bedřich Placák became the new commander. Hospital was moved to Chondzin in October 1953, where it served only the civilian population. In total, during their tenure, Czechoslovak doctors performed more than 700 demanding operations and allowed 594 patients to return to the front.

=== Jan Šejna testimony ===
General Jan Šejna who escaped Czechoslovakia in 1968 when he was threatened with prosecution for economic crime, stated that experiments were carried out on captured American soldiers in this hospital, which were allegedly to continue in the military hospital in Prague. According to his testimony, given in 1992 before the Armed Forces Subcommittee of the Committee on National Security of the House of Representatives of the US Congress, the Czechoslovak hospital was engaged in experiments on captured American soldiers. He stated that part of the American soldiers were later transported to Czechoslovakia, where the experiments continued in a military hospital in Prague. Šejna stated that Ludvík Souček, a doctor at the time and later a well-known writer, was one of the participants. According to Šejna's statement, the commander of Czechoslovak operations in North Korea was Colonel (later a general) Rudolf Babka from the intelligence service of the military intelligence of the General Staff, who worked in North Korea as a diplomat from the Ministry of Foreign Affairs of the Czechoslovak Republic. The real head of this hospital was supposed to be Colonel Professor MUDr. Vladimír Dufek, heart specialist. In the initial phase, according to Šejna, eighteen Czechoslovak doctors and a larger number of auxiliary personnel were to be involved in this operation. During the preparation for this task, several Czechoslovak doctors were allegedly trained in the field of atomic radiation and its effects on the human body at the Institute of Atomic Medicine in Dubno near Moscow. At the request of the US, an investigation was carried out to clarify the fact. Czechoslovak members of the Supervisory and Repatriation Commission of neutral states were also contacted.

Many historians such as Karel Pacner or Zdeněk Vališ believe that Šejna's testimony was fabricated as there is no evidence to support Šejna's claims and the hospital itself was deemed unfit for any secret activity due to a large portion of North Korean doctors and quickly changing staff.
