= Stanislav Procházka =

Czech ice hockey player (born 1973)

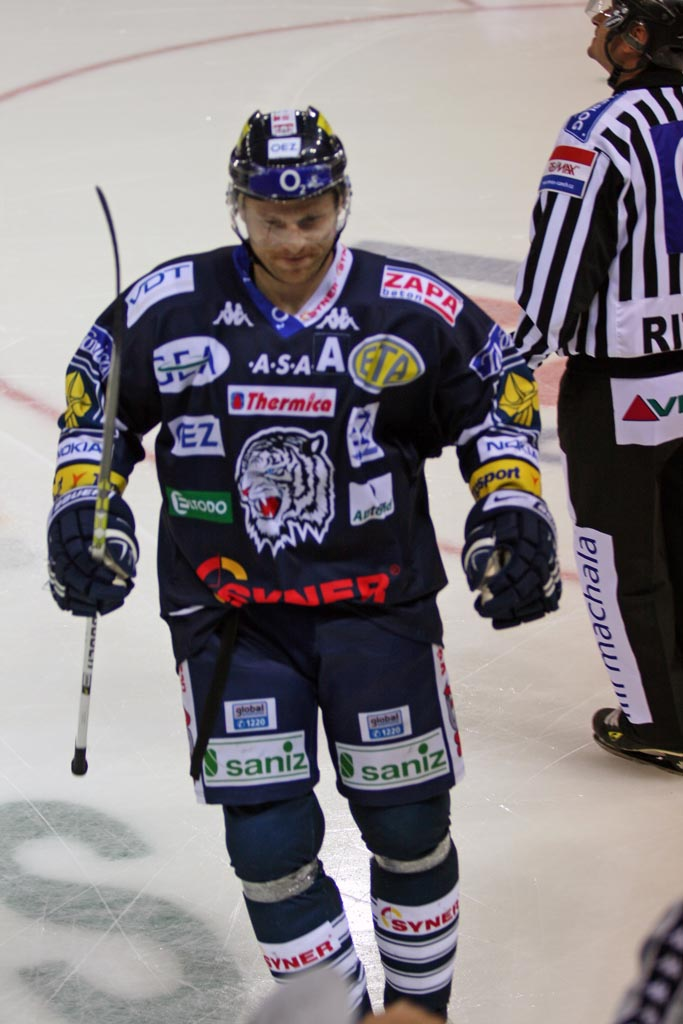
- Born: 11 June 1973 (age 52) Pardubice, Czechoslovakia
- Height: 6 ft 1 in (185 cm)
- Weight: 198 lb (90 kg; 14 st 2 lb)
- Position: Forward
- Shot: Left
- Played for: HC Dynamo Pardubice; HC České Budějovice; HC Bílí Tygři Liberec
- Playing career: 1991–2015

Standa Procházka (Czech pronunciation: [ˈstaɲɪslaf ˈproxaːska], born 11 June 1973) is a Czech former professional ice hockey player. He plays forward for HC Liberec in the Czech Extraliga. He played in the Czech Extraliga for HC Dynamo Pardubice, Motor České Budějovice and HC Bílí Tygři Liberec. He was captain for Liberec from 2005 to 2008, before Jaroslav Modrý arrived and took over the captaincy.
