= Anton Slimák =

Czechoslovak general (1941–2020)

Anton Slimák (29 December 1941 – 26 November 2020) was a Slovak lieutenant general, who served as the Chief of the General Staff of the Czechoslovak People's Army from 1989 to 1991. He was the only Slovak to hold this position. He was born on December 29, 1941 in Svätý Jur, Bratislava Region. He studied at the Jan Žižka Military School in Moravská Třebová, where he graduated in 1958. He was Deputy Chief of the Intelligence Administration of the General Staff from October 1986, and two years later, he assumed the position of Deputy Chief of the General Staff. On 27 December 1989, he became the first Chief of the General Staff after the Velvet Revolution. He was promoted to Lieutenant General in May 1990. In May 1991, President Václav Havel dismissed him from his post due to a difference of opinion. Two years later, he joined the Slovak Army, from where he was transferred to the reserve in March 1995.

He died on November 26, 2020 in Soběslav, South Bohemia at the age of 78. He is buried in the local Soběslav cemetery.
