= Milán Václavík =

Slovak-origin Czechoslovak military officer and politician (1928–2007)

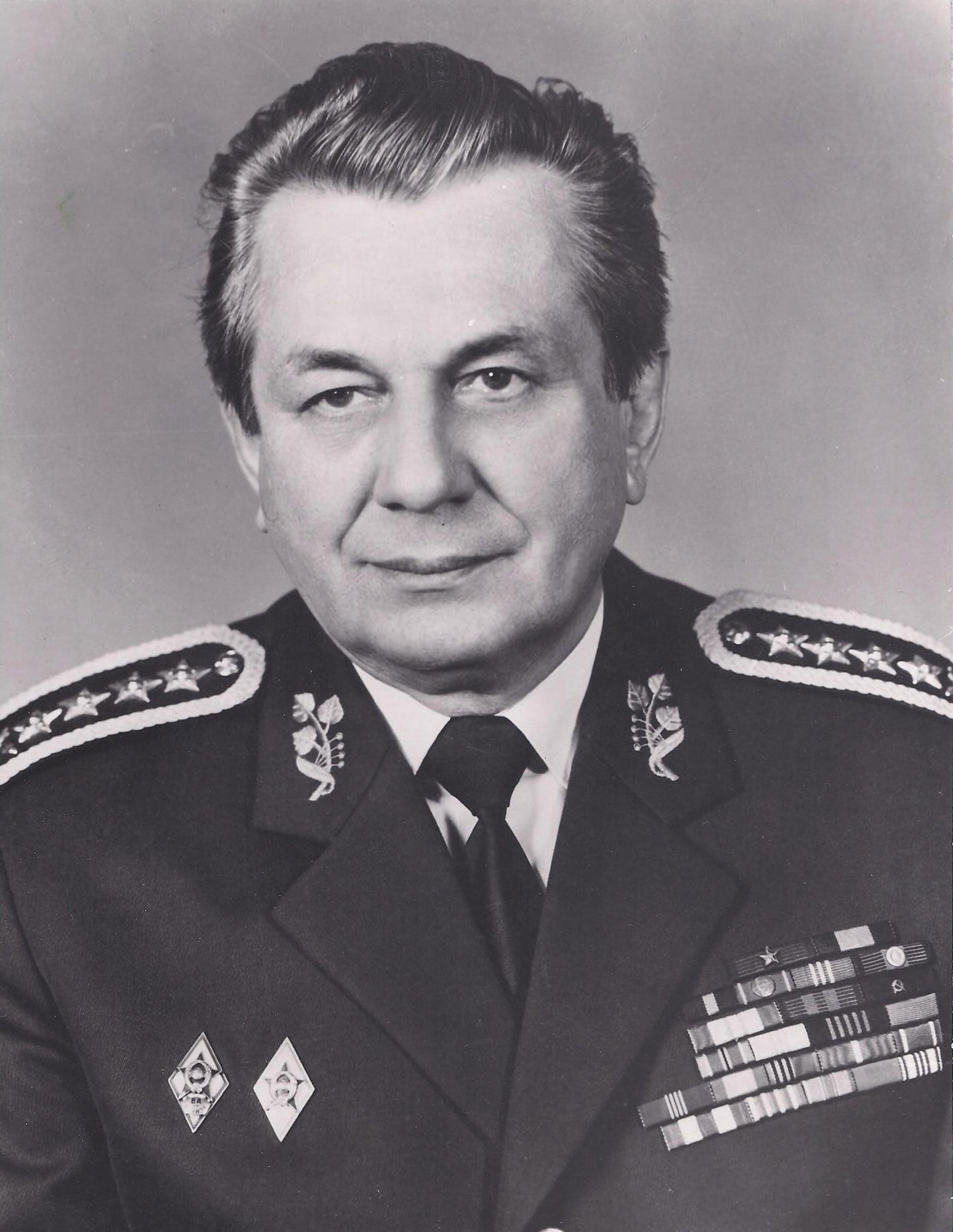

Minister of Defense
- In office 11 January 1985 – 3 December 1989
- President: Gustáv Husák
- Prime Minister: Lubomír Štrougal; Ladislav Adamec
- Preceded by: Martin Dzúr
- Succeeded by: Miroslav Vacek

Personal details
- Born: 28 March 1928 Predmier, Czechoslovakia
- Died: 2 January 2007 (aged 78) Tábor, Czech Republic
- Party: Communist Party of Czechoslovakia
- Education: Frunze Military Academy; General Staff Academy
- Awards

Military service
- Allegiance: Czechoslovakia
- Rank: Colonel General

Milán Václavík (28 March 1928 – 2 January 2007) was a Slovak-origin Czechoslovak military officer with the rank of colonel general. He served as defence minister from 1985 to 1989, being the last communist-era defence minister of Czechoslovakia.

== Early life ==
Václavík was born in Predmier, Zilina district in Slovakia, on 28 March 1928. He held an engineering degree. In the 1950s he was sent to the Soviet Union for military training and attended the Frunze Military Academy and the General Staff Academy.

== Career ==
Václavík worked as an engineer until 1949 when he joined the Czechoslovak People's Army. In the 1970s he served as deputy commander of the western military district. He was later promoted to the rank of colonel general. He served as first deputy chief of the army General Staff from 1983 to 11 January 1985.

He was appointed defence minister on 11 January 1985, replacing Martin Dzúr in the post. Václavík served in the cabinet led by Prime Minister Lubomír Štrougal under the President Gustáv Husák. Václavík became a member of the central committee of the Communist Party of Czechoslovakia soon after his appointment. He retained his post in the cabinet formed by Prime Minister Ladislav Adamec in October 1988.

On 29 November 1989 Václavík was asked by the Federal Assembly to answer the question to whom the Czechoslovak People's Army was subordinated. In response Václavík stated that it was subordinated to those who supported socialism, leading to concerns among the Czechoslovak parliamentarians. Upon this incident and due to the pressures on the Prime Minister Adamec to relieve him from the post he was removed from office. Then Miroslav Vacek became the new defense minister on 3 December 1989.

== Later years and death ==
Following his removal from office Václavík lost all his credibility due to his support for the continuation of the communist regime in the country. He was prosecuted in January 1996 together with other former major Communist Party figures. All of them were charged with the illegal arming of the militia. In September 1996 Václavík was pardoned by the president Václav Havel because of poor health. Václavík died in 2007.
