= Czechoslovak People's Army =

Armed forces of the Communist Party of Czechoslovakia

- Československá lidová armáda (in Czech); Československá ľudová armáda (in Slovak)
- Flag of the Czechoslovak People's Army (1960–1990)
- Motto: Za vlast–za socialismus Za vlasť–za socializmus (For Homeland–For Socialism)
- Founded: 1 June 1954
- Disbanded: 14 March 1990
- Service branches: Land Forces; Air Force
- Headquarters: Prague, Czechoslovakia

Leadership
- President of Czechoslovakia: See list: Klement Gottwald, Antonín Zápotocký, Antonín Novotný, Ludvík Svoboda, Gustáv Husák, Václav Havel
- Minister of Defence: See list: Alexej Čepička, Bohumír Lomský, Martin Dzúr, Milán Václavík, Miroslav Vacek
- Chief of the General Staff: See list: Václav Kratochvíl, Otakar Rytíř, Karel Rusov, Miloslav Blahník, Miroslav Vacek, Anton Slimák

Personnel
- Active personnel: 201,000 (1987)

Related articles
- Ranks: Ranks of the Czechoslovak Armed Forces

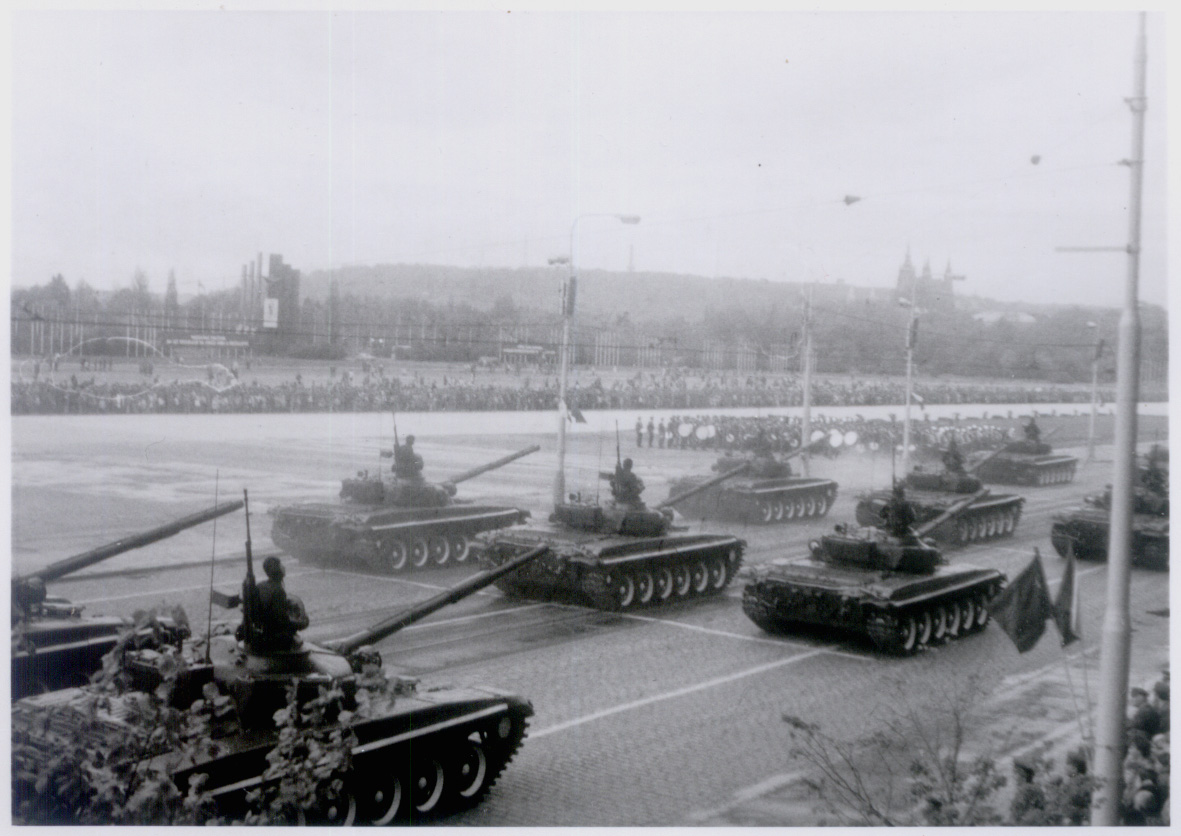
CSPA tank parade in Prague on Victory Day, 9 May 1985

The Czechoslovak People's Army (Czech: Československá lidová armáda, Slovak: Československá ľudová armáda, ČSLA) was the armed forces of the Communist Party of Czechoslovakia (KSČ) and the Czechoslovak Socialist Republic from 1954 until 1989. From 1955 it was a member force of the Warsaw Pact. On 14 March 1990 the Army's name was officially reverted to the Czechoslovak Army removing the adjective "People's" from the name. The Czechoslovak Army was split into the Czech Armed Forces and the Slovak Armed Forces after the dissolution of Czechoslovakia on 1 January 1993.

== Transition to Communist rule ==
On 25 May 1945 the Provisional organization of the Czechoslovak armed forces was approved, according to which there was a reorganization of the Czechoslovak army. Soldiers who had fought against Nazism on all fronts of World War II gradually returned. The territory of Czechoslovakia was divided into four military areas in which emerged gradually over 16 infantry divisions, which complemented the Tank Corps and Artillery Division. The Czechoslovak I Corps which had served under Soviet control became the 1st Czechoslovak Army, before becoming the 1st Military Area. Initial optimism about the plans to rebuild the army was replaced by disillusionment, stemming from a broken post-war economy and the lack of human and material resources. The Czechoslovak Army after the war was commissioned to expel Germans and Hungarians, and was also involved in helping the national economy. In addition, units of the National Security Corps participated in the fighting against the Organisation of Ukrainian Nationalists.

After 1948, when the Communist Party of Czechoslovakia took power, there were significant changes in the military. More than half of the officers began to experience persecution as well as soldiers, and many were forced to leave. The political processes focused mainly on soldiers who fought in World War II in Western Europe, but paradoxically there was also persecution of soldiers fighting the war on the Eastern Front. The army came fully under the power of the Communist Party and in 1950 there was a major reorganization of the Soviet model, and the military areas were disbanded. In 1951 there was signed between Czechoslovakia and the Soviet Union the Agreement on the manner and terms of settlement for the supplied equipment and material provided by the USSR loan of almost 44 million rubles for the purchase of military equipment, especially aircraft and radars. There has been an increase in proliferation and increasing the number of servicemen of the army, which since 1953 reached over 300,000.

The final Report of the Commission of Inquiry of the Federal Assembly for clarification of events of 17 November 1989 characterized the Czechoslovak People's Army as follows: "... the Czechoslovak Army, next to the SNB (the people's police force) and LM (the paramilitary workers militia), was understood as one of the direct power tools designed for control over society and for the immediate management of internal political problems; the Communist Party by means of a vast staff of the Main Political Administration (HPS) of ČSLA penetrated as far as into the lowest units and in this way virtually ensured its absolute influence on the Army." During the Velvet Revolution, Communist Minister of National Defence Milán Václavík proposed to use the army against demonstrators, but his suggestion was not heeded.

== Components ==
The ČSLA was composed of Ground Forces, Air Forces and Air Defence Forces and Border Guard under the direction of the General Staff.

=== Ground Forces ===
Of the approximately 201,000 personnel on active duty in the ČSLA in 1987, about 145,000, or about 72 percent, served in the ground forces (commonly referred to as the army). About 100,000 of these were conscripts. There were two military districts, Western and Eastern. A 1989 listing of forces shows two Czechoslovak armies in the west, the 1st Army at Příbram with one tank division and three motor rifle divisions, the 4th Army at Písek with two tank divisions and two motor rifle divisions. In the Eastern Military District, there were two tank divisions, the 13th and 14th, with a supervisory headquarters at Trenčín in the Slovak part of the country.

Czechoslovak military doctrine prescribed large tank columns spearheading infantry assaults. While the armoured columns secured objectives, the infantry would provide close support with mortars, snipers, anti-tank guns and medium artillery. The majority of the soldiers in the Ground Forces were recruited through conscription, compulsory military service of 24 months for all males between 18 and 27.

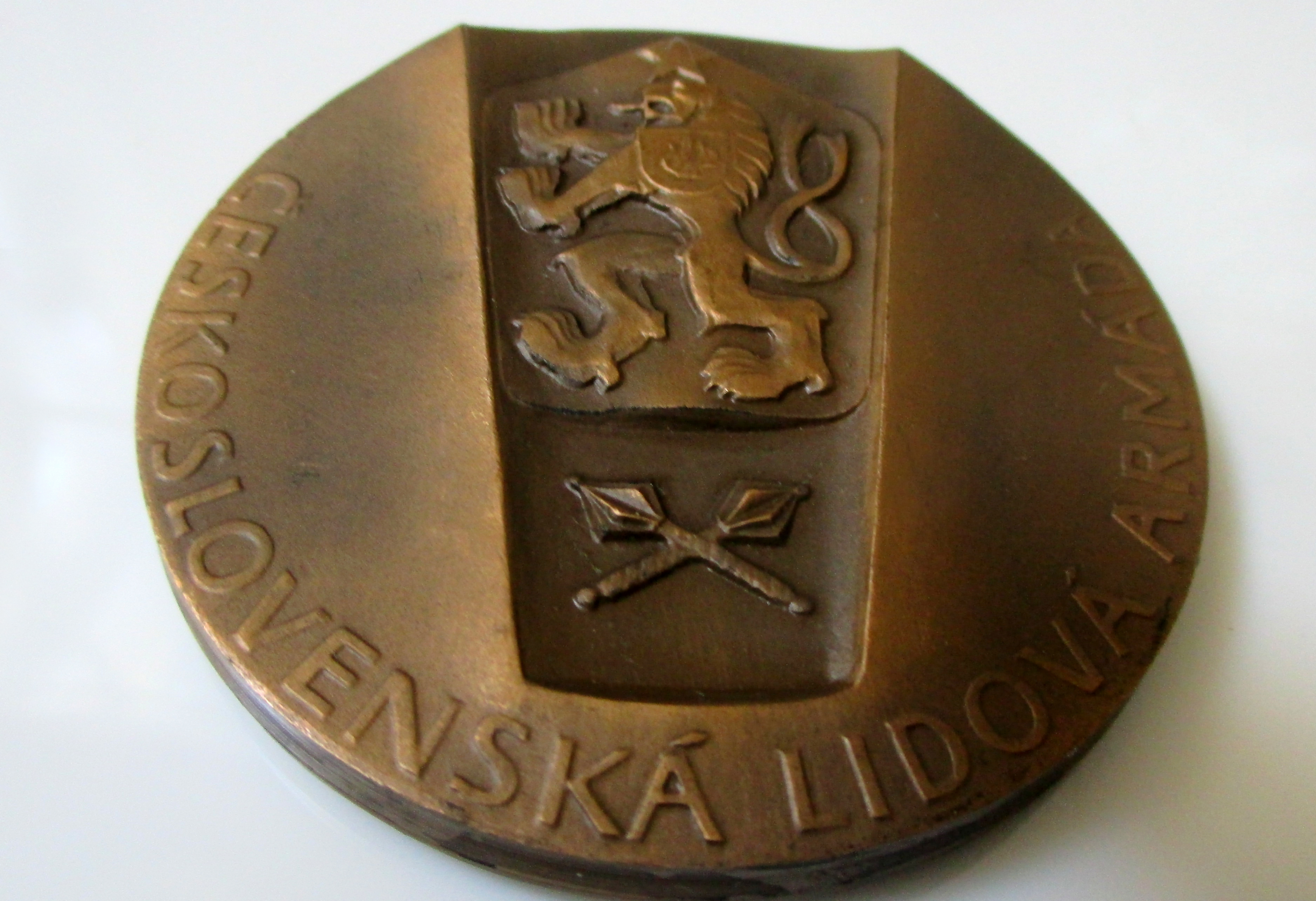
Medal of Honor – ČESKOSLOVENSKÁ LIDOVÁ ARMÁDA

=== Air Force ===
The Air and Air Defence Forces of the CPA celebrated 17 September 1944, as the birth date of their force. On that date, a fighter regiment, manned by Czechoslovak personnel, the 1st Czechoslovak Fighter Air Regiment - flew out for Slovak soil to take part in the Slovak National Uprising. This first regiment grew into the 1st Czechoslovak Mixed Air Division, which fought with the Soviets. Yet it was only six years after the war, in 1951, when Czechoslovak units began receiving aircraft - jet fighters - to create a combat capability.

The Czechoslovak Air Force was fully equipped with supersonic jet fighters, attack helicopters, air defence systems and electronic tracking equipment.

=== Air Defence Forces ===
The Army's air defence (PVOS, Protivzdušná obrana státu) had anti-aircraft missile units, fighter interceptor aircraft and radar and direction-finding units, known, in accordance with Soviet terminology, as radio-technical units.

=== Border Guard ===
Pohraniční Stráž, Pohraničná stráž (English: Border guard) was established in 1950s after the Second World War. However, it was part of the army only until 1977, when it was subordinated to the federal ministry of Interior. It was the smallest branch of the Czechoslovak People's Army with nearly 17,000 soldiers and staff members by 1951. Their main task was to guard and patrol all borders of Czechoslovak Socialist Republic. The most guarded borders were Austrian and West German borders.

== Means of higher military education ==
- Antonin Zapotocky Military Technological Academy (Brno)
- Klement Gottwald Military Academy (Prague)
- Klement Gottwald Military Political Academy in Bratislava
- Ludvík Svoboda Military Ground Forces University in Vyškov
- Military Air Forces University "Slovak National Uprising" in Košice
- Military Technical School "Czechoslovak-Soviet Friendship" in Liptovský Mikuláš
- Military Topographic Institute in Dobruška
- Military Cartographic Institute in Harmanec
- Military Geographic Institute in Prague
- Military Medical Institute in Hradec Králov

== Characteristics ==
One of the official marches of the ČSLA was the March of the Submachine Gunners ("Pochod samopalníků") by Jan Fadrhons.

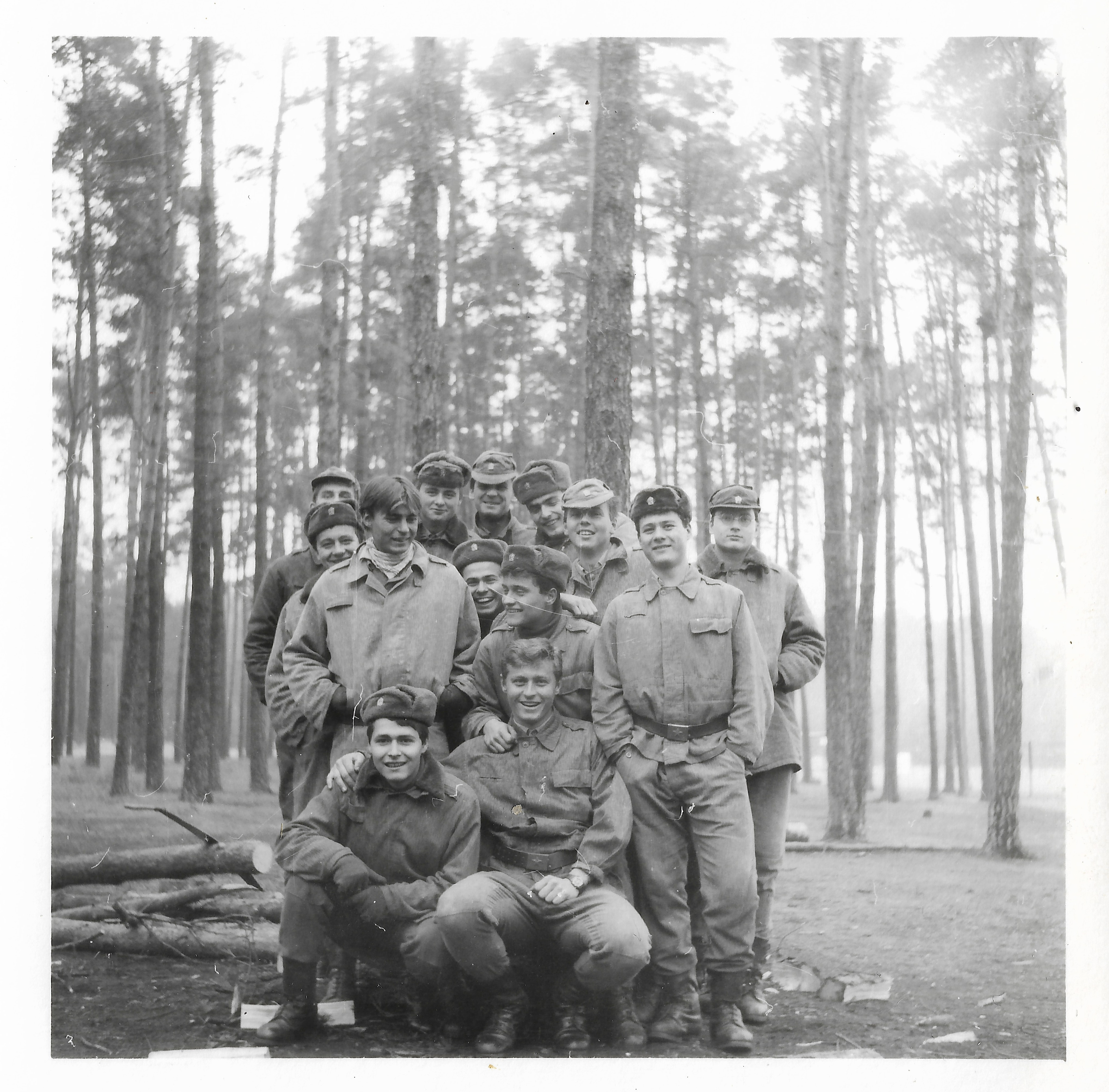
Czechoslovak soldiers in semi-dress uniform

=== Appearance ===
- After the Second World War Czechoslovak army used its pre-war uniform until 1960. When a new uniform pattern was introduced: With the new uniform vz. 60. Vz.60 used classic green pattern military uniform with darker grey lines on the surface of uniform. Vz.60 uses Strichtarn style pattern. Nicknamed mlok (English: salamander), the uniform also came with the vz.53 helmet and vz.62 boots.
- The Border Guard used khaki woolen coats with red and green elements. They used green caps with an iron star in which was the symbol of Czechoslovakia.

=== Organs of the military press ===
- Národní Obrana (National Defense) newspaper
- Lidová Armáda (People's Army) magazine
- Czechoslovak Warrior magazine
- Zápisník (Notepad) magazines

=== Cultural and propaganda institutions ===
- Professional Sport Army Center DUKLA in Banská Bystrica
- Army Art Ensemble "Vít Nejedlý"
- Central Military Band of the ČSLA
- Military Art Ensemble "Captain Ján Nálepka"
- Czechoslovak War Film Studio

The band served as one of the ideological tools of the Communist Party of Czechoslovakia from the 1950s until November 1989.

External videos
- Czechoslovak Military Parade "Shield-84" - Vojenská přehlídka ČSLA "Štít-84

=== Holidays and celebrations ===
The ČSLA had the following professional holidays:

- 15 January - Day of the Rocket Forces and Artillery, the anniversary of the actions of the 1st Czechoslovak Army Corps and the 38th Army in a battle near the Polish city of Jaslo on 15 January 1945.
- 6 October - Day of the Czechoslovak People's Army, the anniversary of the Battle of the Dukla Pass on 6 October 1944.
- 17 September - Aviation Day of the Czechoslovak People's Army

During the period of the Czechoslovak Socialist Republic, regular Victory Day Parades were held by the Czechoslovak People's Army in Letná. The first parade took place in 1951 and, since, they were held every five years on 9 May up until 1990. The parade also marked the Prague uprising. The last of these parades took place in 1985. Kde domov můj and Nad Tatrou sa blýska (the Czechoslovak national anthem) were performed by the massed bands on parade before being followed by the State Anthem of the Soviet Union. Parades were also held in Bratislava as well.

== Equipment ==
=== Small Arms ===
Weapon	Origin	Type	Notes	Photo
Vz. 52	Czechoslovakia	Semi-automatic pistol	Replaced by the vz. 82 in the 1980s.	
Vz,. 82	Czechoslovakia	Semi-automatic pistol	Standard issue until dissolution of Czechoslovakia.	
Vz. 52 rifle	Czechoslovakia	Self-loading rifle	Used for very short period of time. Replaced by Vz. 58 for frontline use.	
Vz. 58	Czechoslovakia	Assault rifle	Standard issue rifle.	
Škorpion	Czechoslovakia	Submachine gun		
PPSh-41	Soviet UnionCzechoslovakia	Submachine gun	Used during and after World War II until it was succeeded by the vz. 58.	
Sa 23	Czechoslovakia	Submachine gun	Replaced by Škorpion.	
UK vz. 59	Czechoslovakia	General purpose machine gun	Replaced older Vz. 52 machine gun. Two versions of machine gun were used, one with longer barrel other one with shorter barrel. UK vz. 59 L, UK vz. 59 T.	
Vz. 52 machine gun	Czechoslovakia	Light machine gun	Used for short period of time.	
SVD	Soviet Union	Designated marksman rifle		
Mosin–Nagant	Russian Empire Soviet Union	Bolt-action rifle	Briefly used Model 1891s from the Czechoslovak Legions until Ground Forces Mauser variants were introduced after the First World War. After the Soviet-backed coup in 1948, Czechoslovakia began converting M91 rifles to M91/38 carbines in the late 1950s. The Czechs developed a Mosin derivative sniper rifle known as the Vz.54 sniper rifle.	
Vz. 24	Czechoslovakia	Bolt-action rifle	Still used as standard issue before the Vz. 52 was introduced.	
RPG-7	Soviet Union	Rocket propelled grenade	Passed on successor states.	
P-27	Soviet UnionCzechoslovakia	Rocket propelled grenade	Produced domestically under the designation P-27.	
RPG-75	Czechoslovakia	Light AT weapon	Czechoslovak equivalent of M72 LAW.	

=== Ground Forces ===
Tanks	Origin	Type	Versions	In service	Notes
T-72	Soviet Union; Czechoslovakia	Main battle tank	M, M1	900	Domestically produced.
T-55	Soviet Union; Czechoslovakia	Main battle tank	A, AM1, AM2	1,927	Domestically produced.
T-34-85	Soviet Union; Czechoslovakia	Medium tank		373	Domestically produced. Also called the T-36 in Czechoslovak service or T-34-85cz for export.
ISU-152	Soviet Union	Heavy Self-Propelled Gun		>2	Also called the TSU-152 ( stands for "Těžké Samohybné Dělo" ). Imported in late 1940s and stopped in 1951. In the 1960s (and late '50s) most to all were kept in reserves and only used for military parades. In 1970s, Czech workers used the TSU-152s for hauling heavy work.

APC/AFC	Origin	Type	Versions	In service	Notes
BVP-2	Czechoslovakia	IFV		310	53 in storage in 1991
BVP-1	Czechoslovakia	IFV		1,250	109 in storage in 1991
OT-810	Nazi Germany; Czechoslovakia	APC		1,900 (760 in storage)	Czechoslovak version of Sd.Kfz. 251
OT-90	Czechoslovakia	APC		1,900 (760 in storage)	BVP-1 hull with BTR-70 turret.
OT-65	Hungary	APC		1,900 (760 in storage)	Czechoslovak designation to the D-442 FUG
OT-64	Czechoslovakia	APC	A/C	1,900 (760 in storage)	Developed jointly with Poland.
OT-62 TOPAS	Czechoslovakia	APC	A, B	1,900 (760 in storage)	Czechoslovak version of BTR-50
BRDM-2	Soviet Union	Reconnaissance/Patrol Vehicle		480 (422 in storage)	Amphibious scout vehicle.
OT-65	Hungary; Czechoslovakia	Reconnaissance/Patrol Vehicle	A	300	Czechoslovak designation to the D-442 FUG.

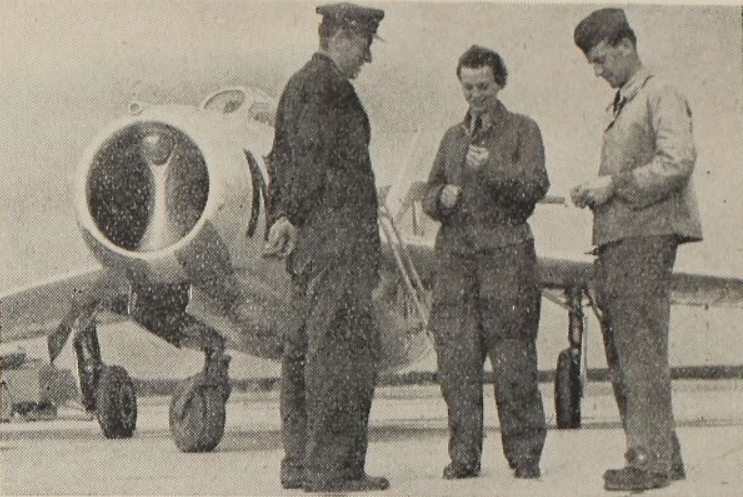
Elena Báčová with the ground crew in front of the ČSLA Air Force MiG-15 aircraft

=== Air and Air Defence Forces ===
Model	Origin	Type	Versions	In service	Notes
MiG-29	Soviet Union	Fighter	UB	20	18 Single-Seat, 2 Training
MiG-23	Soviet Union	Fighter	MF, ML, BN, U	70	32 BN, 13 MF, 17 ML, 8 UB,
MiG-21	Soviet Union; Czechoslovakia	Fighter, Ground-Attack	R, MF, U, M, UM, PF	180+	
MiG-15	Soviet UnionCzechoslovakia	Fighter,	S-102, S-103, CS-102, MiG-15SB, MiG-15T, MiG-15V	1,473	
Su-25	Soviet Union	Ground-Attack	K, UBK	38	36 Single-Seat, 2 Training
Su-22	Soviet Union	Attack	M4, UM3K	60	52 Single-Seat, 8 Training
Mi-24	Soviet Union	Attack Helicopter	D, V	60	28 Mi-24D,2 Mi-24UD, 30 Mi-24V
Mi-17	Soviet Union	Transport		83	
L-39	Czechoslovakia	Training	C, ZA, V	57+	24 L-39C, 27 L-39ZA, 6 L-39V
S-300	Soviet Union	Mobile SAM system	PMU	4	1 battery to defend Prague
S-200	Soviet Union	Fixed SAM system		250 launchers	6 Regiments, 40 launch sites
S-125	Soviet Union	Fixed SAM system		250 launchers	6 Regiments, 40 launch sites
S-75	Soviet Union	Fixed SAM system		250 launchers	6 Regiments, 40 launch sites

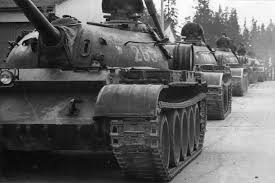
Czechoslovak T-55A tanks heading to the border exercise, estimated 1960s/1970s

=== Artillery ===
==== Rocket systems ====
- Scud-B missile –30 launchers, after dissolution most of the launchers passed on Czech Republic.
- 9K52 Luna-M – 10 launchers.
- OTR-21 Tochka – 8 launchers bought from Soviet Union in 1980s. Soviet Army had deployed 18 launchers in Czechoslovak Socialist Republic.
- OTR-23 Oka – 4 launchers bought from Soviet Union in 1980s. All launchers were decommissioned in 1995.
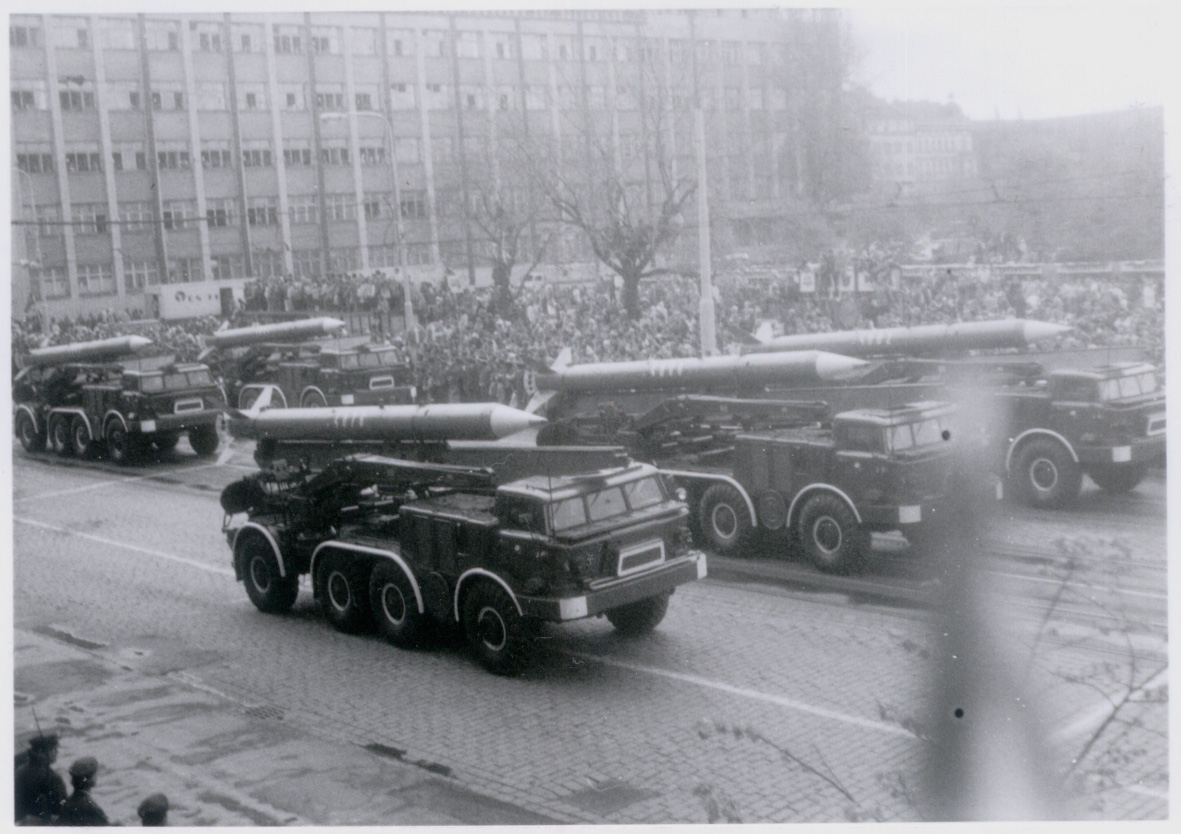
- 9K52 Luna-M ballistic missile on military parade in Prague 1985
  RM-70 multiple rocket launcher– Around 100 launchers. Passed on successor states. BM-21 Grad launcher on Tatra 813.

==== Towed artillery ====
- 122 mm howitzer 2A18 (D-30) –210
- 130 mm towed field gun M1954 (M-46) – Served in 71st Cannon Artillery Brigad. Estimated around 70 artillery pieces.
- 100 mm vz. 53 – 600

==== Self-propelled artillery ====
- 2S4 Tyulpan – 4 artillery pieces used in 1980s
- 2S7 Pion – 4 artillery pieces used in 1980s
- 152 mm SpGH DANA – 408, Czechoslovak 8x8 152mm artillery.
- 2S1 Gvozdika – 448 pieces were bought in 1977

==== Mortars ====
- PRAM-L 120mm
- vz. 52 82mm

=== Air defense ===
==== Mobile missile ====
- 2K12 Kub
- 2K11 Krug
- 9K31 Strela-1 – 80+ systems in 1992.
- 9K33 Osa
- 9K35 Strela-10

===== Mobile self-propelled AA guns =====
- M53/59 Praga – Estimated fewer than 600 in Czechoslovak inventory during the late 80s.

====== Towed anti-aircraft gun ======
- Vz.53 anti-aircraft gun
- ZPU
- AZP S-60 – 400 units as of 1992.

== Ranks of the Czechoslovak People's Army ==
=== Enlisted and non-commissioned officers ===
- Vojín – Private, Airman
- Svobodník – Private First Class, Airman First Class
- Desátník – Corporal, Senior Airman
- Četař – Sergeant
- Rotný – Staff Sergeant
- Staršina – Platoon Sergeant, Flight sergeant (part of the rank system 1948–1959)
- Rotmistr – Sergeant First Class, Technical Sergeant
- Nadrotmistr – Master Sergeant
- Štábní rotmistr – First Sergeant

=== Warrant officers ===
- Podpraporčík – First Warrant Officer
- Praporčík – Warrant officer
- Nadpraporčík – Senior Warrant Officer
- Štábní praporčík – Chief Warrant Officer (abolished 1949)

=== Officers ===
- Podporučík – Sub-lieutenant
- Poručík – Second lieutenant
- Nadporučík – First lieutenant
- Kapitán – Captain
- Štábní kapitán – Senior Captain (abolished 1952)
- Major
- Podplukovník – Lieutenant colonel
- Plukovník – Colonel
- Brigádní generál – Brigade General (abolished 1950)
- Divizní generál – Divisional General (abolished 1950)
- Generálmajor – Major General
- Generálporučík – Lieutenant General
- Sborový generál – Corps General (abolished 1950)
- Generálplukovník – Colonel General
- Armádní generál – General of the Army

== See also ==
- Holešov barracks incident, paratroopers, 1968
- Albanian People's Army
- Bulgarian People's Army
- (East German) National People's Army
- Hungarian People's Army
- Polish People's Army
- Army of the Socialist Republic of Romania
- Soviet Armed Forces
- Yugoslav People's Army
