= Order of the Red Banner (Czechoslovakia) =

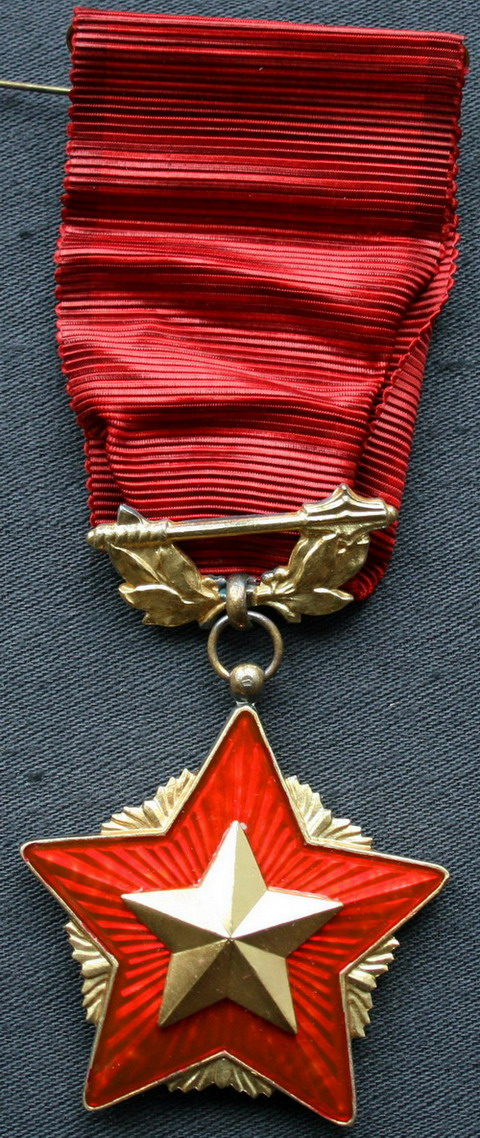
- Type: single-grade order
- Awarded for: Heroism in combat
- Presented by: Czechoslovak Socialist Republic
- Eligibility: Czechoslovak and foreign citizens, military units and formations, military schools, and institutions
- Status: No longer awarded
- Established: 1955
- Ribbon of the award
- Related: Order of the Red Banner (Soviet)

The Order of the Red Banner (Czech: Řád rudé zástavy) was a military decoration of the Czechoslovak Socialist Republic. The medal had been awarded to Czechoslovak citizens as well as foreigners and institutions for services to the state.

== History ==
The Order of the Red Banner was established by Decree No. 6/1955 of the Government of Czechoslovakia on February 8, 1955, which changed the awarding of the honorary title Hero of the Czechoslovak Socialist Republic and established the Order of the Red Banner, the Order of the Red Star, the medal "For Merit in the Defense of the State" and the medal "For Service to the State" .

The statute of the Order was later amended by Government Decree No. 44/1955 of 9 September 1955 and No. 52/1958 of 20 August 1958. The insignia of the order is a silver five-pointed star of red enamel, superimposed on a smaller gold five-pointed star. Two laurel leaves are visible between the rays of the larger star.

== Appearance of the order ==
Its badge is a five-pointed red enamel star with a gold central five-pointed star, supported by gold rays. On the reverse there is a gold disc with the letters ČSR (since 1960 with the letters ČSSR) and the registry number. The ribbon is red with dark red side stripes. The star is connected to the ribbon by a gold pendant, which consists of a horizontally placed mace attached to the ribbon and two laurel branches crossed under the mace and connected by a pendant ring to the star.

== Recipients ==
=== Czechoslovak ===
- Karel Klapálek
- Martin Dzúr
- Rudolf Viest (posthumous)
- Josef Bublik
- Bohumir Lomsky

=== Foreign ===
- Vasily Petrov, Commander-in-Chief of the Soviet Ground Forces from 1980 to 1985.
- Viktor Yermakov, Commander of the Central Group of Forces from 1984 to 1987.
- Sergey Akhromeyev
- Pyotr Vashurin
- Issa Pliyev
- Mikhail Fomichyov
- Dmitry Yazov
- Nikolai Ogarkov

=== Awarded organizations ===
- Zhukov Air and Space Defence Academy (1978)
- Military Academy of the General Staff of the Armed Forces of the Soviet Union
