= Vendelín Opatrný =

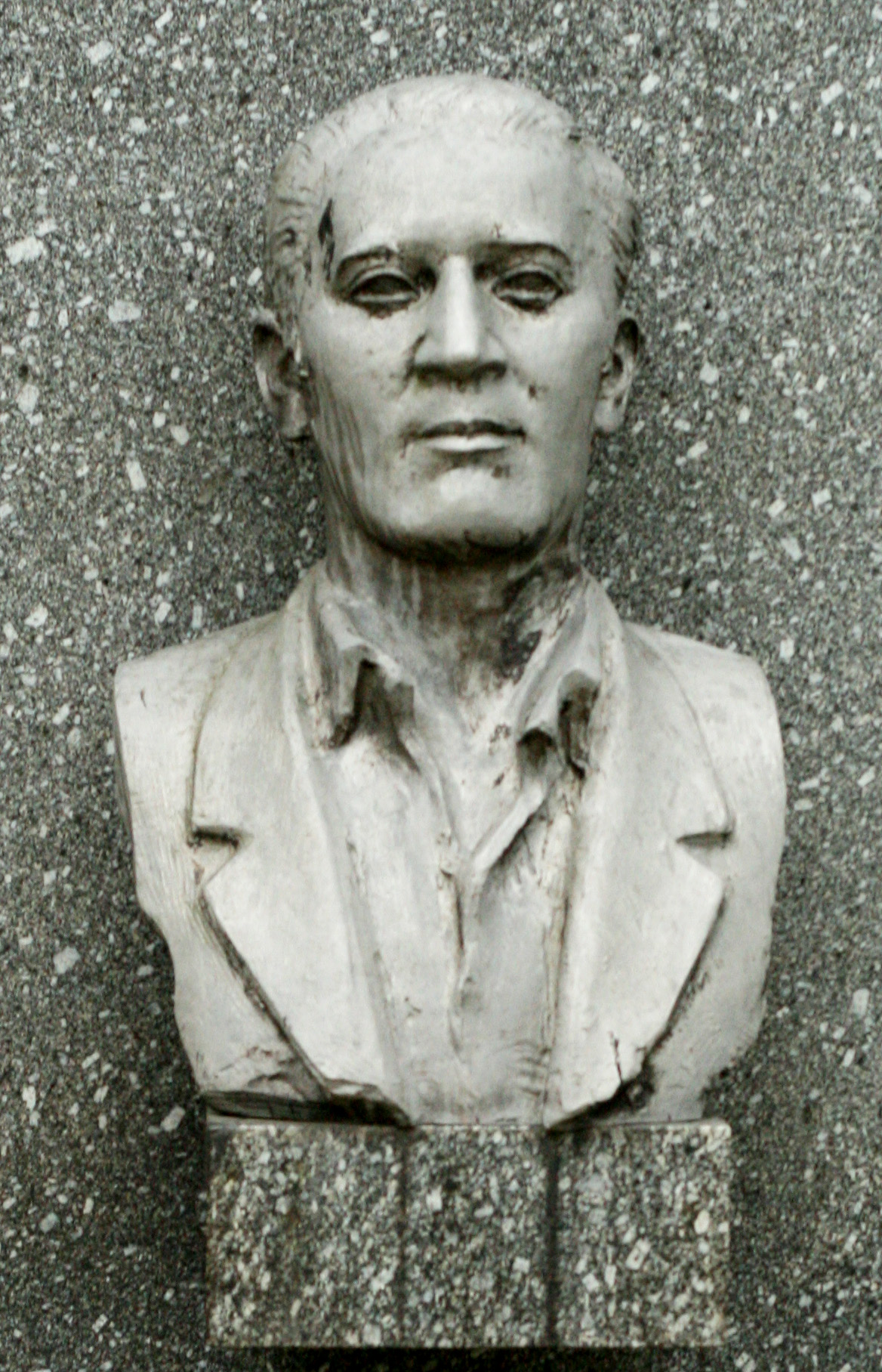
- Vendelín Opatrný bust at Alej hrdinov, Dukla
- Born: Vendelín Opatrný; 10 March 1908; Týniště nad Orlicí, Bohemia
- Died: 31 October 1944 (aged 36) Korejovce, Slovak Republic
- Allegiance: Czech Republic; Spanish Civil War foreign volunteer (Czechoslovakia) Czechoslovak government-in-exile
- Branch: infantry
- Service years: 1928–1929, 1937, 1942–1944
- Rank: in memoriam promoted to captain
- Conflicts: Spanish Civil War; World War II; Battle of Sokolovo; Battle of the Dnieper; Dnieper–Carpathian Offensive; Battle of the Dukla Pass
- Awards: 4× Czechoslovak War Cross 1939-1945 in memoriam: Order of the Red Star; Order of the Patriotic War; Order of the White Lion; Hero of the Czechoslovak Socialist Republic (1969)

Vendelín Opatrný (10 March 1908 – 31 October 1944) was an officer of the Czechoslovak 1st Army Corps. He died during the Battle of the Dukla Pass, at the borders of Czechoslovakia while fighting with the Red Army.

Before entering the Czechoslovak 1st Army Corps in 1937, he fought in the Spanish Civil War as a foreign volunteer. He was 6 times decorated for bravery.

Just before the Second World War he left his country to Soviet Union. Later he enlisted in the Czechoslovak 1st Army Corps.

== Decorations ==
- in memoriam promoted to captain
- in memoriam Hero of the Czechoslovak Socialist Republic (1969)
- for bravery at fight 4× decorated by Czechoslovak War Cross 1939–1945
- Order of the Red Star (USSR)
- Order of the Patriotic War (USSR)

...and several other decorations

- bust of Vendelín Opatrný in Heroes Alley at Dukla Pass by sculptor Ján Kulich (* in 1930)
