= Nové Město nad Metují =

- Town
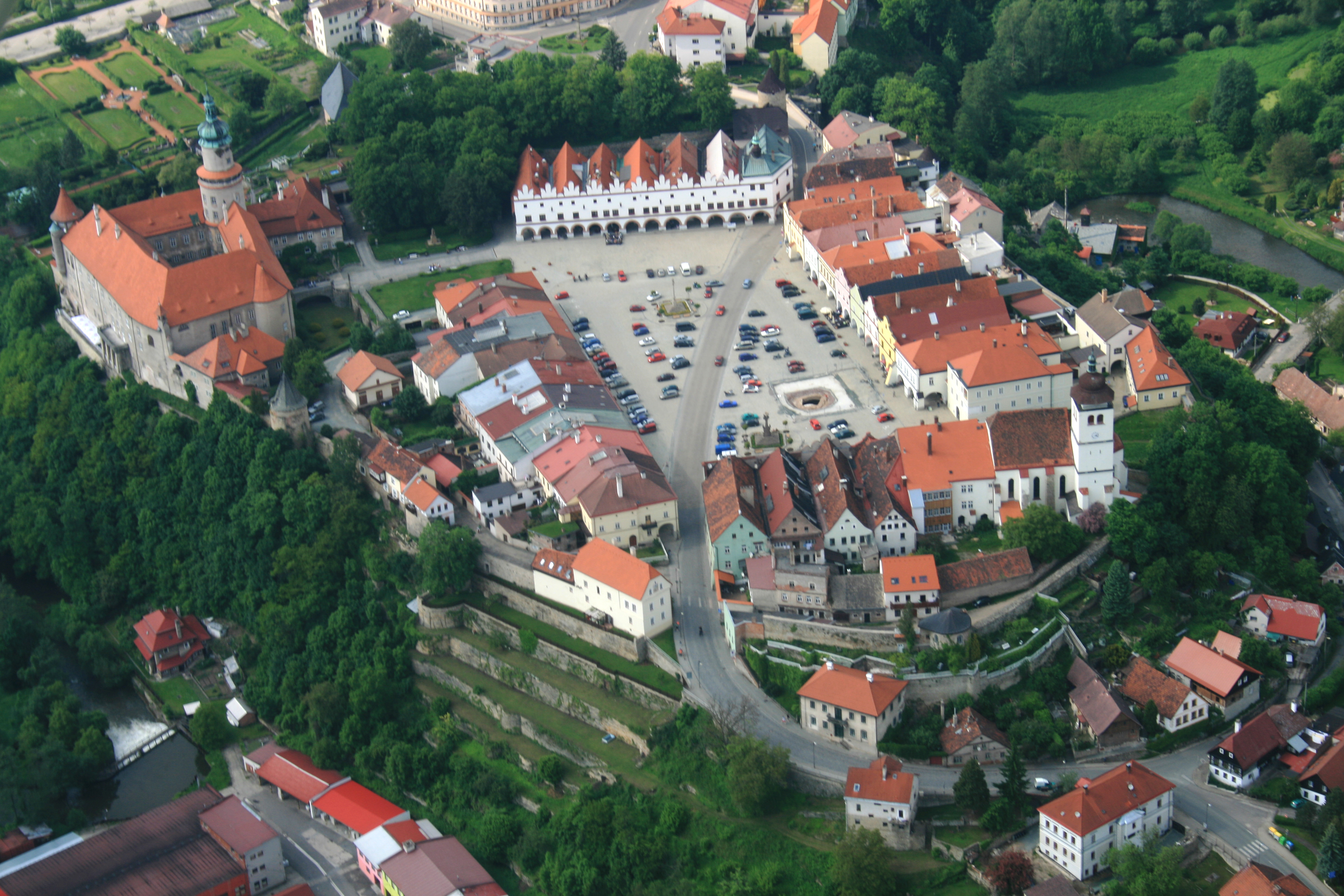
- Aerial view of the castle and the old town

- Flag Coat of arms

- Location in Czech Republic
- Coordinates: 50°20′41″N 16°9′6″E
- Country: Czech Republic
- Region: Hradec Králové
- District: Náchod
- Founded: 1501

Government
  - Mayor: Milan Slavík

Area
  - Total: 23.13 km^{2} (8.93 sq mi)
- Elevation: 332 m (1,089 ft)

Population (2026-01-01)
  - Total: 9,165
  - Density: 396.2/km^{2} (1,026/sq mi)
- Time zone: UTC+1 (CET)
  - Summer (DST): UTC+2 (CEST)
- Postal code: 549 01
- Website: www.novemestonm.cz

Nové Město nad Metují (Czech pronunciation: [ˈnovɛː ˈmɲɛsto ˈnad mɛtujiː]; German: Neustadt an der Mettau) is a town in Náchod District in the Hradec Králové Region of the Czech Republic. It has about 9,200 inhabitants. The town is located on the Metuje River, on the border between the Orlice Table and Orlické Foothills.

Nové Město nad Metují was founded in 1501. The historic town centre is well preserved and is protected as an urban monument reservation. The main landmark of the town is the Nové Město nad Metují Castle.

== Administrative division ==
Nové Město nad Metují consists of four municipal parts (in brackets population according to the 2021 census):

- Nové Město nad Metují (6,716)
- Krčín (1,477)
- Spy (235)
- Vrchoviny (445)

== Etymology ==
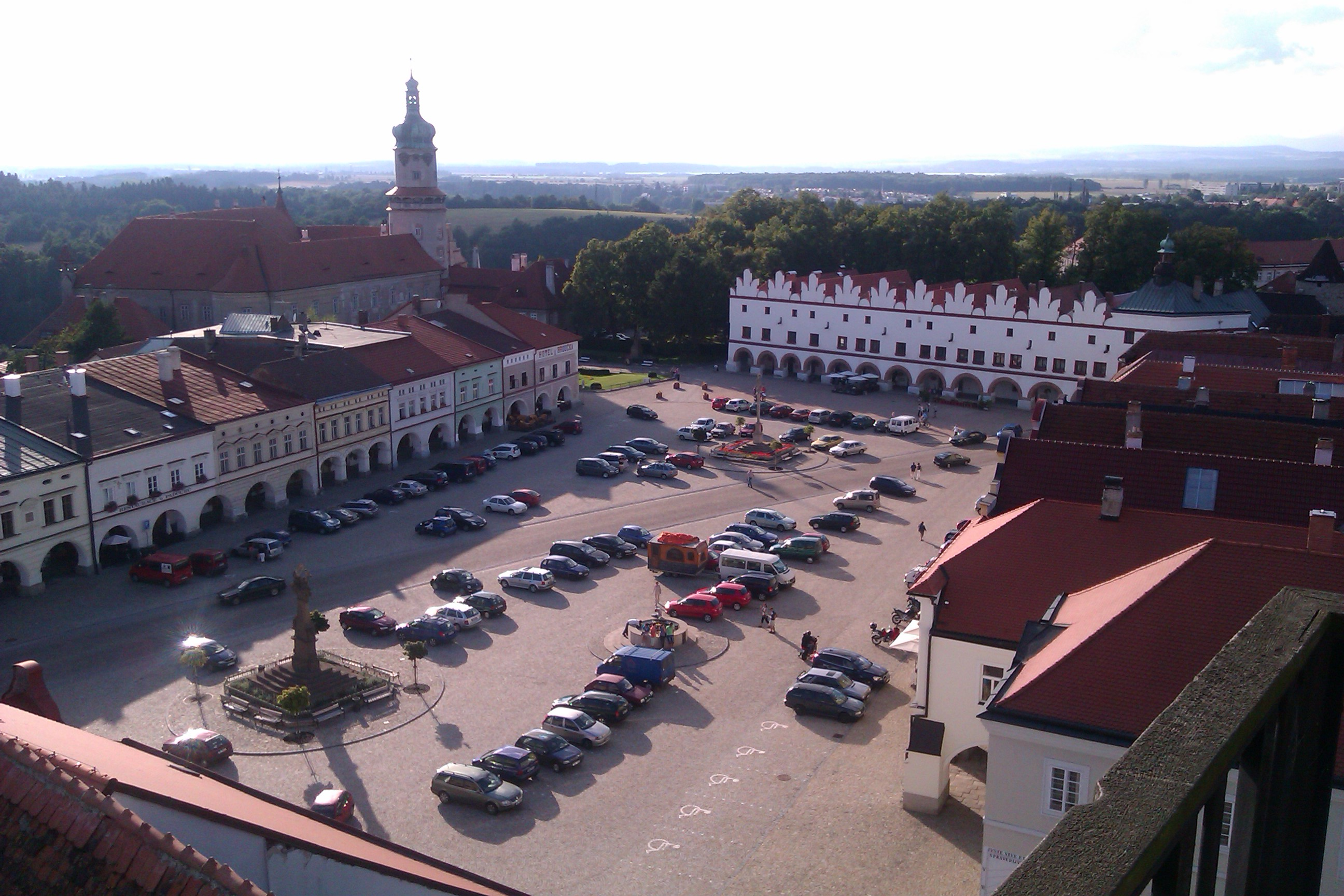
The square Husovo náměstí

The name literally means 'new town upon Metuje' in Czech.

== Geography ==
Nové Město nad Metují is located about 7 kilometres (4 mi) south of Náchod and 25 km (16 mi) northeast of Hradec Králové. It lies on the border between the Orlice Table and Orlické Foothills. The highest point is at 450 m (1,476 ft) above sea level. The old town and the castle lie on a rocky promontory in a meander of the Metuje River, hence the name.

== History ==
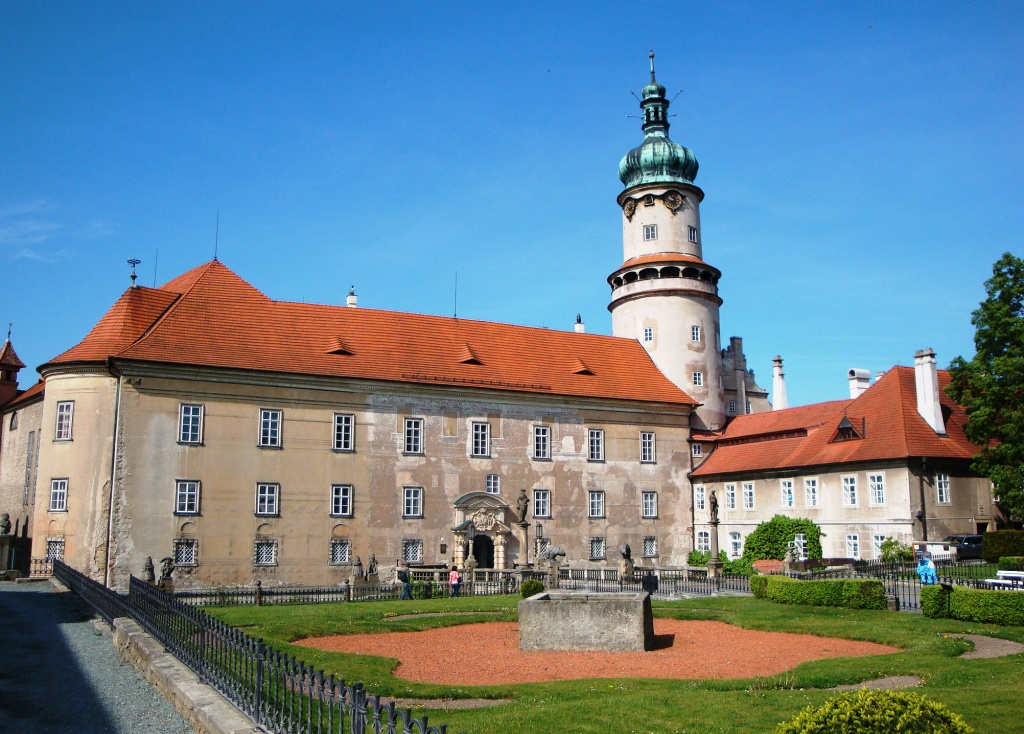
Nové Město nad Metují Castle

The oldest inhabited part of Nové Město nad Metují is Krčín. An old Slavic settlement was in the territory of Krčín in the 7th and 8th centuries. The Krčín village was probably founded in the 13th century and first documented in the first half of the 14th century. After Nové Město nad Metují was founded, it became part of the Nové Město nad Metují estate.

Nové Město nad Metují was founded by Jan Černčický of Kácov on 10 August 1501. It was destroyed by fire in 1526. In 1527, the estate was acquired by the Pernštejn family. In 1527–1548, most of the houses on the square were then reconstructed in uniform Renaissance and late Gothic design. The elementary ground plan was kept. The connected gables, so-called swallow tails, gave the town the appearance of the northern Italian Renaissance. The castle was also rebuilt.

From 1548 to 1621, the estate was owned by Lords of Stubenberk, who expanded the castle. Albrecht von Wallenstein purchased the town in 1623, then it passed to the Trčkas of Lípa. After the assassination of Albrecht von Wallenstein and Adam Erdman Trčka in 1634, their properties were confiscated and Nové Město nad Metují estate received Walter Leslie, the main initiator of the assassination.

Walter Leslie has rebuilt the castle in the Baroque style. The Leslie family owned the estate until 1802, when the last member of the family died, and Nové Město nad Metují was inherited by the Dietrichstein family. The Dietrichstein family owned it until 1858.

After the revolution and administrative reform of the Austrian Empire in 1848, Nové Město nad Metují became independent of the nobility. From 1849 to 1949, Krčín was a separate municipality.

== Demographics ==
Historical population

| Year | Pop. | ±% |
|---|---|---|
| 1869 | 3,789 | — |
| 1880 | 4,011 | +5.9% |
| 1890 | 4,507 | +12.4% |
| 1900 | 5,531 | +22.7% |
| 1910 | 6,212 | +12.3% |

| Year | Pop. | ±% |
|---|---|---|
| 1921 | 5,699 | −8.3% |
| 1930 | 6,004 | +5.4% |
| 1950 | 5,836 | −2.8% |
| 1961 | 6,741 | +15.5% |
| 1970 | 7,988 | +18.5% |

| Year | Pop. | ±% |
|---|---|---|
| 1980 | 9,709 | +21.5% |
| 1991 | 10,220 | +5.3% |
| 2001 | 10,074 | −1.4% |
| 2011 | 9,520 | −5.5% |
| 2021 | 8,873 | −6.8% |

Source: Censuses

== Economy ==
Nové Město nad Metují is a town with tradition in engineering, printing, textile and food industry. The town is known for watch-making production under the brand PRIM. The largest employers based in the town are Ammann Czech Republic, manufacturer of construction machinery, and Hronovský, manufacturer of car parts.

== Transport ==
Nové Město nad Metují is located on the railway lines Náchod–Choceň and Meziměstí–Týniště nad Orlicí.

== Sights ==
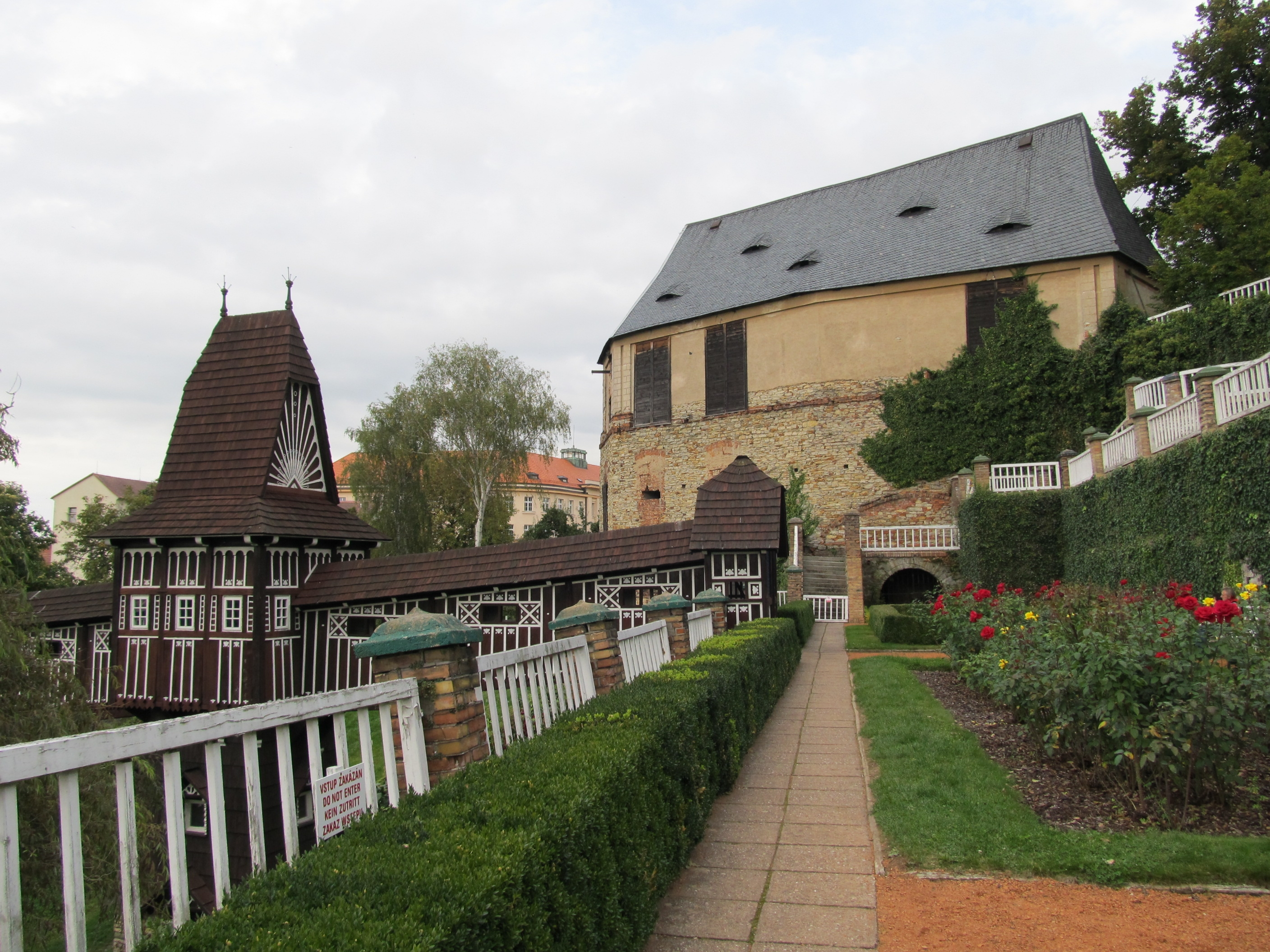
Wooden bridge in the castle garden

The main landmark is the Nové Město nad Metují Castle. The castle mixes Renaissance and early Baroque styles and is open to the public. It includes a castle garden with unique wooden covered bridge statues of dwarves by Matthias Braun, and the 53-metre (174 ft) high Máselnice tower with an accessible gallery at a height of 25 metres (82 ft).

The castle forms a unified architectural unit with the square Husovo náměstí. The most significant monuments are Church of the Holy Trinity from 1519, the northern row of Renaissance houses, or the well in the middle of the square from the 16th century. The historic centre is surrounded by preserved town fortifications. The Zázvorka guarding tower serves nowadays as a gallery.

Outside the historic centre is the monastery complex. The monastery of the Merciful Brothers with Church of the Nativity of the Virgin Mary and Loreta Chapel was founded by Walter Leslie in 1692. Other notable building is Church of the Holy Spirit in Krčín, built in the early Gothic style in the 13th century.

== Notable people ==
- Philipp Josef Pick (1834–1910), Austrian dermatologist
- Karel Klapálek (1893–1984), general
- Jan Milíč Lochman (1922–2004), Czech-Swiss theologian
- Vladimír Suchánek (1933–2021), graphic designer
- Jiří Macháně (1940–2023), cinematographer
- Pavel Černý (born 1962), footballer

== Twin towns – sister cities ==
Nové Město nad Metují is twinned with:

- Duszniki-Zdrój, Poland
- Gârnic, Romania
- Hilden, Germany
- Warrington, England, United Kingdom
