= Ministry of Defence (Czechoslovakia) =

Czechoslovak government ministry responsible for military and defense affairs

Ministry of National Defence
- Czech: Ministerstvo národní obrany Slovak: Ministerstvo národnej obrany

Ministry overview
- Formed: 14 November 1918; 107 years ago
- Dissolved: 31 December 1992; 33 years ago
- Jurisdiction: Czechoslovakia
- Headquarters: Prague, Czechoslovakia
- Ministers responsible: Václav Klofáč, first Minister of National Defence; General Imrich Andrejčák, last Minister of National Defence
- Agency ID: MNO ČSR / MNO ČSSR / MNO ČSFR

The Ministry of National Defense of the Czechoslovak Republic (Czech: Ministerstvo národní obrany Československé republiky, MNO ČSR; later MNO ČSSR (Note: Abbreviation Československá socialistická republika ("Czechoslovak Socialist Republic"), state name between 1960–1990.) and MNO ČSFR (Note: Abbreviation Česká a Slovenská Federativní Republika ("Czech and Slovak Federative Republic"), state name between 1990–1992.)) refers to the defence ministry which was responsible for defense of Czechoslovakia during its existence, from 1918 to 1992.

== List of ministers ==
=== First Czechoslovak Republic (1918–1938) ===
No.	Portrait	Minister	Took office	Left office	Time in office	Party	Defence branch
1	Václav Klofáč	Václav Klofáč (1868–1942)	14 November 1918	24 May 1920	1 year, 192 days	ČSNS	none
2	Vlastimil Tusar	Vlastimil Tusar (1880–1924)	25 May 1920	15 July 1920	51 days	ČSSD	none
3	Ivan Markovič [cs]	Ivan Markovič (1888–1944)	16 July 1920	14 September 1920	60 days	ČSSD	none
4	Otakar Husák [cs]	General; Otakar Husák (1885–1964)	15 September 1920	25 September 1921	1 year, 10 days	Independent	Czechoslovak Army
5	František Udržal	František Udržal (1866–1938)	26 September 1921	8 December 1925	4 years, 73 days	RSZML	none
6	Jiří Stříbrný	Jiří Stříbrný (1880–1955)	9 December 1925	17 March 1926	98 days	ČSNS	none
7	Jan Syrový	General of the Army; Jan Syrový (1888–1970)	18 March 1926	11 October 1926	207 days	Independent	Czechoslovak Army
(5)	František Udržal	František Udržal (1866–1938)	12 October 1926	15 September 1929	2 years, 338 days	RSZML	none
8	Karel Viškovský [cs]	Karel Viškovský (1868–1932)	16 September 1929	28 October 1932	3 years, 42 days	RSZML	none
9	Bohumír Bradáč [cs]	Bohumír Bradáč (1881–1935)	29 October 1932	3 June 1935	2 years, 217 days	RSZML	none
10	František Machník [cs]	František Machník (1886–1967)	3 June 1935	21 September 1938	3 years, 101 days	RSZML	none

=== Second Czechoslovak Republic (1938–1939) ===
No.	Portrait	Minister	Took office	Left office	Time in office	Party	Defence branch
1	Jan Syrový	General of the Army; Jan Syrový (1888–1970)	22 September 1938	27 April 1939	217 days	Independent	Czechoslovak Army

=== Czechoslovak government-in-exile (1940–1945) ===
No.	Portrait	Minister	Took office	Left office	Time in office	Party	Defence branch
1	Sergěj Ingr	General of the Army; Sergěj Ingr (1894–1956)	21 July 1940	19 September 1944	4 years, 60 days	Independent	Czechoslovak Army
2	Jan Masaryk	Jan Masaryk (1886–1948)	20 September 1944	3 April 1945	195 days	Independent	none

=== Third Czechoslovak Republic (1945–1948) ===
No.	Portrait	Minister	Took office	Left office	Time in office	Party	Defence branch
1	Ludvík Svoboda	General of the Army; Ludvík Svoboda (1895–1979)	4 April 1945	7 June 1948	3 years, 64 days	Independent	Czechoslovak Army

=== Czechoslovak Socialist Republic (1948–1989) ===
No.	Portrait	Minister	Took office	Left office	Time in office	Party	Defence branch
1	Ludvík Svoboda	General of the Army; Ludvík Svoboda (1895–1979)	7 June 1948	24 April 1950	1 year, 321 days	KSČ	Czechoslovak Army
2	Alexej Čepička	General of the Army; Alexej Čepička (1910–1990)	25 April 1950	24 April 1956	5 years, 365 days	KSČ	Czechoslovak Army
3	Bohumír Lomský	General of the Army; Bohumír Lomský (1914–1982)	25 April 1956	23 April 1968	11 years, 364 days	KSČ	Czechoslovak People's Army
4	Martin Dzúr	General of the Army; Martin Dzúr (1919–1985)	24 April 1968	11 January 1985	16 years, 262 days	KSČ	Czechoslovak People's Army
5	Milán Václavík	General of the Army; Milán Václavík (1928–2007)	11 January 1985	3 December 1989	4 years, 326 days	KSČ	Czechoslovak People's Army

=== Czech and Slovak Federative Republic (1989–1992) ===
No.	Portrait	Minister	Took office	Left office	Time in office	Party	Defence branch
1	Miroslav Vacek	General of the Army; Miroslav Vacek (1935–2022)	4 December 1989	17 October 1990	317 days	KSČ	Czechoslovak Army
2	Luboš Dobrovský	Luboš Dobrovský (1932–2020)	18 October 1990	1 July 1992	1 year, 257 days	OF	none
3	Imrich Andrejčák	General; Imrich Andrejčák (1941–2018)	2 July 1992	31 December 1992	182 days	HZDS	Czechoslovak Army

== Ministry of National Defence troops, late 1980s ==
The Ministry was located in Prague, but many directorates had installations outside the capital.

The details are based on the Czech Ministerstvo narodni obrany website, which lists all units of the Czechoslovak People's Army in existence between 1950 and 1990, with their location, subordination, equipment and changes over time.

- Main Missile Troops and Artillery Directorate
  - Central Ammunition Depot in Týniště nad Orlicí
  - 6th Armament Base in Olomouc
    - Ammunition Depot Hronsek
    - Ammunition Depot Sklené
    - Ammunition Depot Trenčín
    - Ammunition Depot Poprad
  - Military Repair Plant Moldava nad Bodvou
    - Separate Ammunition Depot Moldava nad Bodvou
  - Military Repair Plant Nováky
    - Separate Ammunition Depot Nováky
- Main Political Department
  - Political Military Academy in Bratislava
- Main Medical Department
- Main Military Transport Directorate
  - 150th Military Traffic Office in Čierna nad Tisou
- Main Construction and Accommodation Directorate
  - 1st Road Construction Brigade in Pardubice
    - 103rd Road Construction Battalion in Klecany
    - 104th Road Construction Battalion in Nepomuk
    - 107th Road Construction Battalion in Chrudim
    - 108th Road Construction Battalion in Prague
    - 109th Road Construction Battalion in Stará Boleslav
      - 112th Road Construction Battalion in České Budějovice
      - 113th Road Construction Battalion in Týn nad Vltavou
      - 115th Road Construction Battalion in Týn nad Vltavou
      - 116th Road Construction Battalion in Horažďovice
    - 2nd Road Construction Brigade in Bratislava
      - 101st Road Construction Battalion in Vyškov
      - 102nd Road Construction Battalion in Liptovský Mikuláš
      - 105th Road Construction Battalion in Bratislava
      - 106th Road Construction Battalion in Levice
      - 110th Road Construction Battalion in Zbraslav
      - 114th Road Construction Battalion in Levice
  - Equipment Department
  - Quartermaster Department
  - Combat Training Department
  - Educational Department
    - Military Ground Forces University in Vyškov
    - Military Air Forces University in Košice
      - 1st Air School Regiment in Přerov with MiG-21F-13 fighters
        - 1st Flight School Squadron
        - 2nd Flight School Squadron
        - 3rd Flight School Squadron
        - 4th Flight School Squadron
        - 28th Air Base Battalion
        - 11th Electronic Support Battalion
      - 2nd Air School Regiment in Košice with Aero L-29 Delfín and L-39 Albatros jet trainers
        - 1st Flight School Squadron
        - 2nd Flight School Squadron
        - 3rd Flight School Squadron
        - 4th Flight School Squadron
        - 20th Air Base Battalion
        - 4th Electronic Support Battalion
      - 3rd Air School Regiment in Piešťany with Mi-2 helicopters
        - 1st Flight School Squadron
        - 2nd Flight School Squadron
        - 3rd Air Base and Electronic Support Battalion
      - Foreign Air Forces Training Center in Košice
      - 10th Military Air Forces Maintenance Center in Prešov
    - Military Technical University in Liptovský Mikuláš
  - Engineer Troops Department
    - Repair Base 042 in Olomouc
  - Fuel Distribution Department
  - Chemical Troops Department
    - NBC-detection Center in Hostivice
  - Professional Sport Army Center DUKLA in Banská Bystrica
  - Veterinary Service Section
    - Military Veterinary Research and Training Institute in Košice
  - Automobile Repair Plant Zlatovce in Trenčín
  - Central Tank and Automobile Depot in Nitra

== See also ==
- Czechoslovak Army
- Czechoslovak People's Army
- Government Army (Bohemia and Moravia)
- Ministry of Defence (Czech Republic)
- Ministry of Defence (Slovakia)
