= Martin Dzúr =

Slovak military officer and a communist politician (1919–1985)

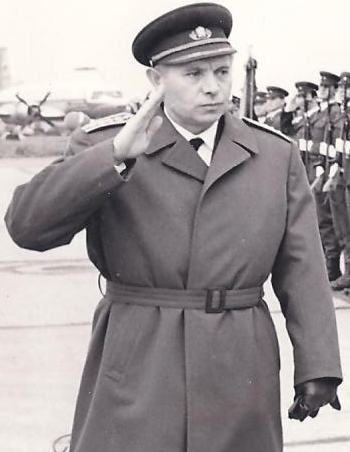
- Dzúr in 1969

Minister of National Defense
- In office 23 April 1968 – 11 January 1985
- President: Ludvík Svoboda
- Prime Minister: Lubomir Strougal
- Preceded by: Bohumír Lomský
- Succeeded by: Milán Václavík

Personal details
- Born: 12 July 1919 Plostin, Liptovský Mikuláš District
- Died: 15 January 1985 (aged 65) Prague, Czechoslovakia
- Party: Communist Party of Czechoslovakia
- Education: General Staff Academy

Military service
- Allegiance: Czechoslovakia
- Branch/service: Czechoslovak Army
- Years of service: 1941–1985
- Rank: Army General
- Battles/wars: World War II

Martin Dzúr (12 July 1919 – 15 January 1985) was a Slovak military officer and a communist politician, who served as defense minister of Czechoslovakia from 1968 to 1985.

== Early life and education ==
Dzúr was born in Ploštín (now part of Liptovský Mikuláš), Slovakia, on 12 July 1919. His parents were peasants. From 1937 to 1939 he studied woodworking. In the late 1940s he graduated from a military school, a higher academic course and the General Staff Academy in Moscow. He also received a degree in engineering.

== Career and activities ==
Dzúr joined the Slovak army for military draft service in 1941. However, he left the Slovak army and defected to the Soviet Union in January 1943. He joined both the Soviet forces and the illegal Czechoslovak Communist Party in 1943. Then he began to serve in the 119th brigade of the Red Army. Following World War II he became a captain in the Soviet-assisted Czechoslovak independent brigade in 1946.

In 1959, Dzúr was made deputy defense minister. He was appointed defense minister under President Ludvík Svoboda in April 1968, replacing Bohumír Lomský in the post. He was a colonel general when he was named as the minister of defense. Four months after Dzúr's appointment the Soviet Union invaded Czechoslovakia in August 1968.

In the immediate aftermath of the invasion, Dzúr was arrested in his office by two Soviet military officers. Ivan Yershov, Soviet chief of staff during the invasion, stated in 1989 that Dzúr initially refused to take orders from the Soviets, arguing that only Alexander Dubček, leader of the Czechoslovak communist party, could give orders to him. However, Andrei Grechko, the former commander of the Warsaw Pact, told Dzúr by telephone that "if a single Czechoslovak soldier fired so much as one shot, he would personally hang Dzúr from the first tree." Dzúr was allowed only to call Dubček to inform him of the invasion. On 28 September 1968 Dzúr increased the number of Czechoslovak military areas accessible to Soviet troops.

Dzúr was elected to the communist party's central committee in 1971. His term as defense minister ended on 11 January 1985 when he retired from office due to ill health. Milán Václavík replaced him in the post.

=== Views ===
Dzúr was close to Alexander Dubček. The 1970 CIA report describes Dzúr as a moderate like Dubček.

=== Honours and awards ===
Dzúr was awarded the highest Soviet prize, the Order of Lenin, in 1983.

== Death ==
Only four days after his removal from office Dzúr died of "a long and serious illness" in Prague on 15 January 1985.
