= Bohumír Lomský =

Czech-Czechoslovak politician (1914–1982)

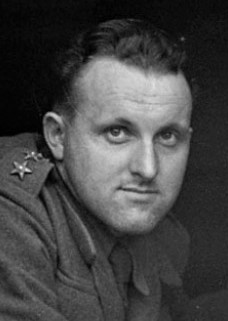
- Lomský in 1941

Minister of National Defense
- In office 25 April 1956 – 23 April 1968
- President: Ludvík Svoboda
- Preceded by: Alexej Čepička
- Succeeded by: Martin Dzúr

Personal details
- Born: April 22, 1914 České Budějovice, Austria-Hungary
- Died: June 18, 1982 (aged 68) Prague, Czechoslovakia
- Party: Communist Party of Czechoslovakia

Military service
- Allegiance: Czechoslovakia
- Branch/service: Air Force of the Polish Army; Czechoslovak People's Army
- Years of service: 1939–1968
- Rank: Army General
- Battles/wars: World War II

Bohumír Lomský (April 22, 1914 – June 18, 1982) was a Czech and Czechoslovak politician of the Communist Party of Czechoslovakia, a post-February deputy of the National Assembly of the Czechoslovak SSR and the Chamber of People of the Federal Assembly, an officer, resistance fighter, and Minister of National Defense of Czechoslovakia.

== Early life and education ==
He was born in České Budějovice in the family of a factory worker, Bohumir Lenka. He studied at the České Budějovice reform grammar school, then volunteered for the army. In August 1936, he graduated from the Military Academy in Hranice. He served with the 14th Infantry Regiment in Košice as a platoon commander, then was exceptionally appointed company commander. In the fall of 1938, he completed an air observer course. After the proclamation of the Slovak State, he returned home in March 1939 and began studying at the University of Chemistry in Prague.

== World War II ==
In August 1939, he went into Polish exile and joined the Polish Air Force. In mid-September, he was interned by the Soviets. From March 1940, he was a member of the Eastern Group of the Czechoslovak Army, where he first held the position of squadron commander, and from October 1941, he became the group's chief of staff. From February 1942 he served in the same position in Buzulu, where he effectively directed the entire training and organization of the units. In January 1943 he became deputy commander of the First Czechoslovak Field Battalion, and in early March 1943 he temporarily commanded the battalion. For his commanding abilities he received the Czechoslovak War Cross of 1939 and the Soviet Order of the Patriotic War, 1st degree. In June 1943 he became chief of staff of the 1st Czechoslovak Infantry Brigade and distinguished himself in the battles near Kiev , Bílá Tserekva and Žaškov, in which he was the main planner of the Prague offensive. From May 1944 he held the position of chief of staff of the 1st Czechoslovak Army Corps and remained in it until the end of the war. From autumn 1945 he studied at the Voroshilov Higher Military Academy in Moscow, which he graduated first in his class.

== Post-war ==
From 1945 he held leading positions in the Czechoslovak Army and also officially changed his name from Lenc to Lomský. In 1948–1949 he was a division commander and the chief of staff of the military district, in 1951–1953 he held the post of chief of the Military Technical Academy. In 1953–1956 he was the first deputy minister of national defense under Alexei Čepička.

The 11th Congress of the Communist Party of Czechoslovakia elected him a member of the Central Committee of the Communist Party of Czechoslovakia. The 12th Congress of the Communist Party of Czechoslovakia and the 13th Congress of the Communist Party of Czechoslovakia confirmed him in office. He resigned from his position on the Central Committee of the Communist Party of Czechoslovakia in June 1968. He also held government positions. In the second government of Viliam Široký, he became Minister of National Defense in 1956. He retained this position in the following third government of Viliam Široký and the government of Jozef Lenárt until April 1968 .

He also sat in the highest legislative body for a long time. In the 1960 elections, he was elected to the National Assembly of the Czechoslovak Socialist Republic for the West Bohemian Region as a non-party candidate. He defended his mandate in the 1964 elections. He sat in the National Assembly until the end of its term in 1968.

== Later career ==
During the Prague Spring of 1968, his career was dampened. He left his ministerial post and his position in the Central Committee of the Communist Party of Czechoslovakia. As of 1968, he was listed professionally as an employee of the Military Historical Institute from the Tachov District. After the federalization of Czechoslovakia, he was elected to the Chamber of People in 1969 for Tachov constituency, where he remained until the end of the electoral term in 1971. Due to his stance on the Warsaw Pact invasion of Czechoslovakia, he was retired and dismissed from the Military History Institute in 1970, and until his death he worked as a specialist at the Institute of Handling, Transport, Packaging and Storage Systems in Prague.

== Awards ==
- Military Order of the White Lion
- Czechoslovak War Cross 1939
- Czechoslovak Medal For Bravery in the Face of the Enemy
- Czechoslovak Military Medal of Merit
- Commemorative medals of the Czechoslovak Army abroad
- Order of the Patriotic War
- Order of the Red Banner
- Medal "For the Victory over Germany in the Great Patriotic War 1941–1945"
- Medal "For the Liberation of Prague"
- Order of the Slovak National Uprising
- Sokolovský Memorial Medal
- Order of the Red Star (Soviet Union)
- Virtuti Militari
- Order of the Cross of Grunwald
- Order of the Red Star (Czechoslovakia)
- Order of Labor
- Order of the Red Banner (Czechoslovakia)
- Order of the Red Banner of Labor
