= Jan Milíč Lochman =

Czech-Swiss theologian

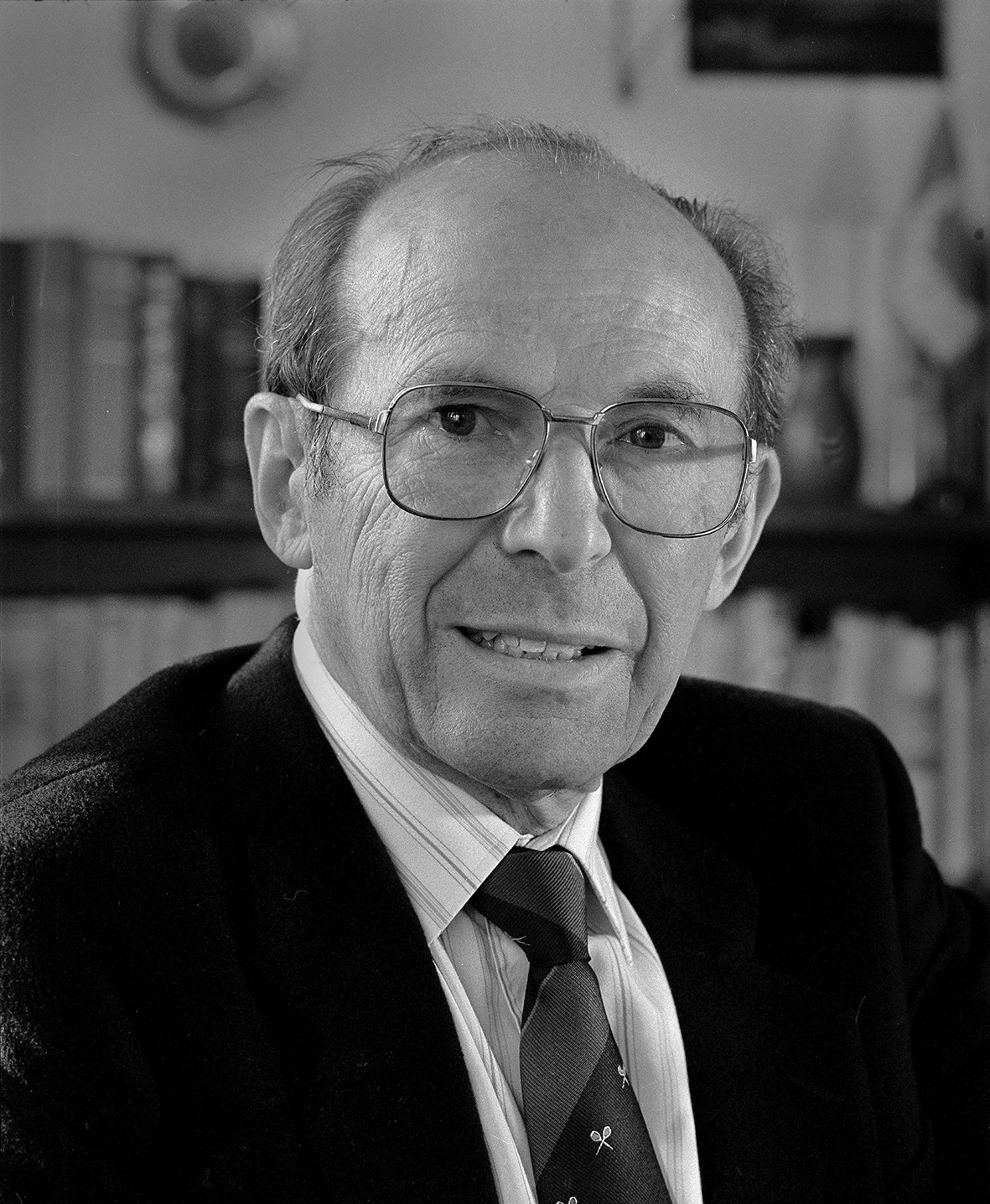
- Born: 3 April 1922; Nové Město nad Metují
- Died: 21 January 2004 (aged 81); Basel
- Education: professor, docent
- Alma mater: Jiráskovo gymnázium Náchod
- Occupation: Philosopher, Protestant theologian
- Awards: Order of Tomáš Garrigue Masaryk (1998); honorary citizen of Nové Město nad Metují (1991); honorary doctor of the University of Aberdeen (1973); honorary doctor of the University of St Andrews (1989); honorary doctor of the Charles University of Prague (1992); Jacob Burckhardt Prize (1987)

Jan Milíč Lochman (sometimes written as Jan Milič Lochman or Jan Milic Lochman; 3 April 1922 – 21 January 2004) was a Czech-Swiss Protestant theologian.

== Life ==
Lochman came from a family with reformed tradition. He graduated from high school in Náchod in 1941. After the Czech part of Charles University was reopened in 1945, he studied theology and philosophy at the Comenius Protestant Theological Faculty (today's Protestant Theological Faculty of the Charles University) and received his doctorate in 1948. Afterwards he was ordained pastor of the Evangelical Church of Czech Brethren. After a short time as a Preacher, he returned to the Comenius Faculty in Prague, where he habilitated and worked as a lecturer. From 1960 he taught there as a professor of philosophy and systematic theology. After a year at Columbia University's Union Theological Seminary (New York City) he was appointed full professor of systematic theology in 1968 by the University of Basel. In 1981 and 1982, he was rector of the University of Basel. From 1990 he was also able to give guest lectures at Czech and Slovak universities. He is professor emeritus from 1992.

Lochman has worked on ecumenical bodies for decades, particularly at the World Council of Churches. From 1968 to 1975 he was a member of the WCC central committee and executive committee, and from 1975 to 1991 he was a member of the WCC commission for faith and church order. He also worked for the World Alliance of Reformed Churches: from 1970 to 1982 as chairman of the theological department. His basic work was in the field of systematic and ecumenical theology.

Jan Milíč Lochman was one of the co-founders of the Christian Peace Conference. At their third session in 1960, he worked on the preparation of the 1st All-Christian Peace Assembly in Prague in 1961. There he headed the working group "Cold War" together with the German federal Wolfgang Schweitzer and the Hungarian M. Pálfy.

== Honors ==
- Honorary Doctor of the University of Aberdeen (1973)
- Honorary Doctor of the University of St Andrews (1989)
- Honorary Doctor of Charles Sturt University (1992)
- Tomáš Garrigue Masaryk 3rd Class Order (1998)
- Numerous academic honors, especially international awards for his services to Jacob Burckhardt as a humanities scholar (1987)
