= Ronda (watchmaker) =

Swiss watch company

- Industry: Watchmaking
- Founded: 1946; 80 years ago
- Founder: William Mosset
- Headquarters: Lausen, Basel-Landschaft, Switzerland
- Number of employees: 1'400 (2019)
- Website: Official Page in English

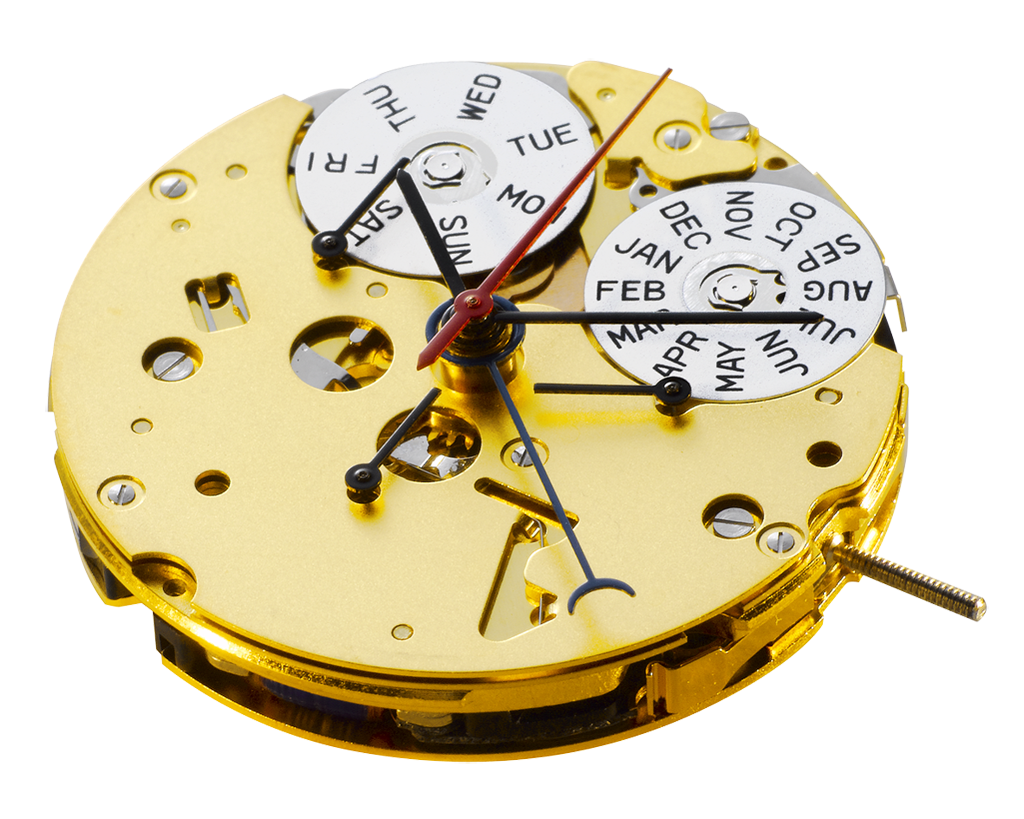
A Ronda Startech 5040F quartz movement

Ronda AG is a Swiss manufacturer of quartz and mechanical watch movements. The company was founded in 1946 by William Mosset and the current headquarters are located in Lausen, Basel-Landschaft.

Their movements are used in a variety of watches around the world, including Shinola, Prim and Mondaine watches.
