= PRIM (watches) =

Czech trademark for a range of watches

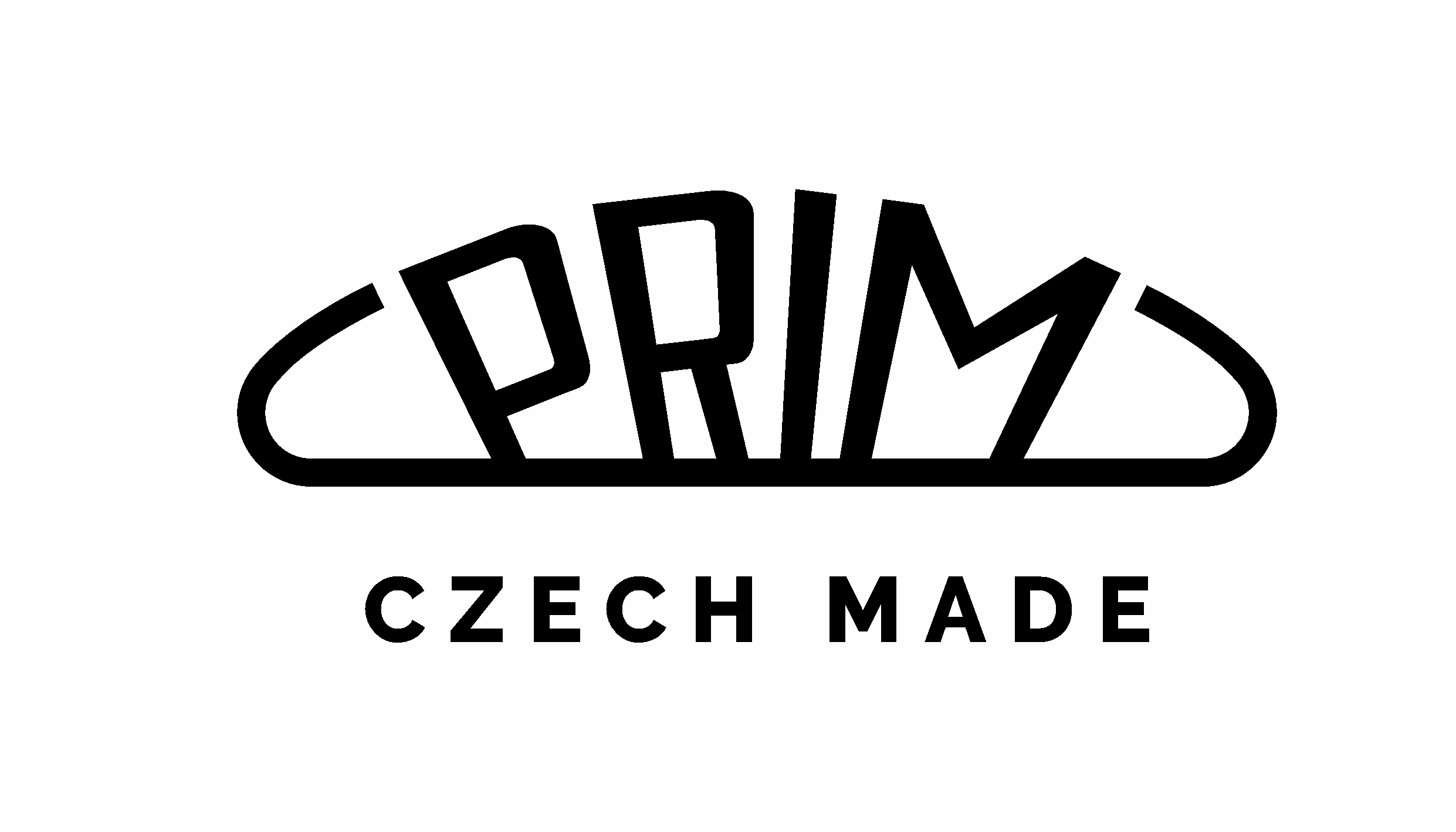
- Company type: Private
- Industry: Watch manufacturing
- Founded: 1957
- Founder: Chronotechna
- Headquarters: Frýdek-Místek, Czech Republic
- Products: Luxury Watches
- Website: https://prim.cz/en/

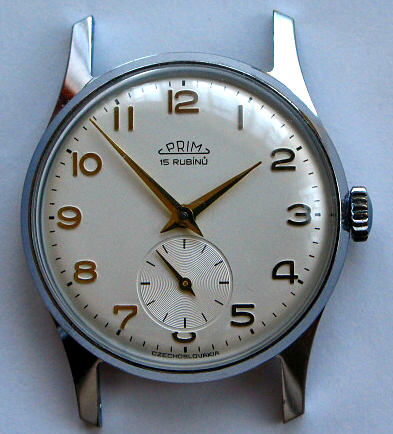
Prim caliber 50, with the older logotype created in 1956

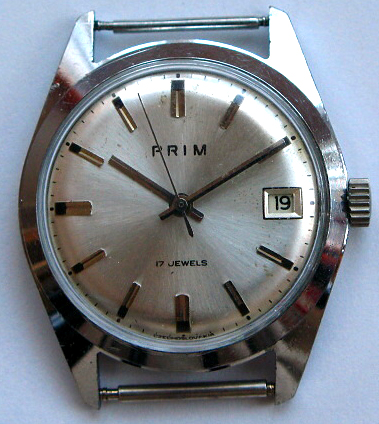
Prim caliber 66, with the newer logotype (since 1969)

PRIM is a Czech trademark for a range of watches. The serial production started in 1957, thus Czechoslovakia has become one of only twelve countries in the world capable of producing wrist watches. Since 2001, the brand was used by the two Czech watches manufacturers (Elton hodinářská and MPM-Quality), which was subject to the long-standing lawsuits. However, in June 2025 MPM-Quality purchased the Elton, thus combining all parts of the Prim brand under one management.

Some more expensive models have watch movements of their own production and some contain movements of foreign manufacture (Japanese or Swiss). The company has three branches in: Frýdek-Místek, Nové Město nad Metují and Prague 1.

== History ==
In 1949, the subsidiary of company Chronotechna Šternberk was established in Nové Město nad Metují, specializing in the production of personal watches (wristwatches and pocket watches). The first prototype watches were made in 1954 and were marked 'Spartak', the 'PRIM' brand was registered in 1956, the serial production started in 1957. It was the only manufacturer of watches in Czechoslovakia, reaching about half a million watches produced annually just before the Velvet Revolution.

The Elton hodinářská manufacturer in Nové Město nad Metují produced watches with this brand, but the brand itself, including the logotype, was owned by the parent company Chronotechna. Chronotechna was after 1989 privatized separately. However, Elton had disagreements with the brand owner, Eutech company (successor of Chronotechna company), and Eutech in 2001 sold the trademark to MPM-Quality company. The legitimacy of the sale and use of the brand is subject to the long-standing lawsuits.

Elton hodinářská of Nové Město nad Metují manufactures luxury custom watches in the price from tens of thousands CZK and most of the parts (including the watch movements) are produced in the Czech Republic. MPM Quality of Frýdek-Místek assemble its watches from imported parts from abroad, which sells at more affordable levels. MPM-Quality is producing watches designed, completed, and tested in the Czech Republic, but watches movements are imported. Watch movements come from the Japanese companies Miyota, Seiko and from Swiss Sellita, Ronda, ETA-SA and Valanvron. The company also specializes in custom production individualization for each model.

MPM-Quality company uses the original logotypes (both older and newer than 1969) and Elton hodinářská used the logotype 'Manufacture PRIM 1949' and the newer logo (since 1969). After the merger of companies, the logos are being unified.

Among users of Elton hodinářská watches are also Václav Klaus, Petr Čech and Alain Delon, as a gift of the Czech Government Office were received for example from Nicolas Sarkozy, Spanish royal couple, Angela Merkel, Barack Obama, Ferenc Gyurcsány, Robert Fico and Donald Tusk. Elton was a supplier to the Czech Olympic Team, the Czech Olympians equipped these watches for Olympics in London, Sochi and Rio de Janeiro. MPM Quality is a supplier to Czech Olympic Team from 2017 to 2024 starting with PyeongChang.

== Own wristwatch movements ==
=== Historical ===
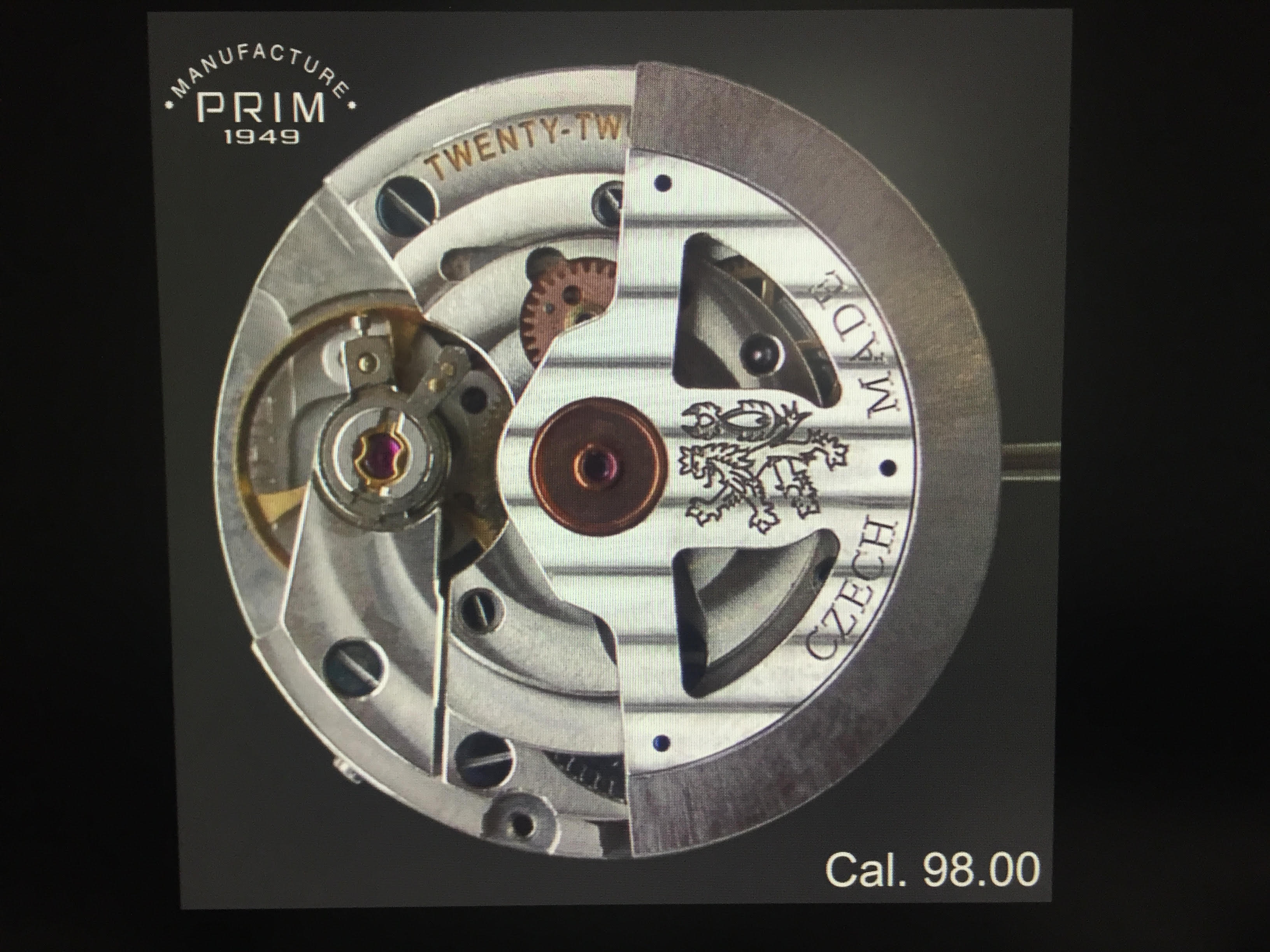
The Prim movement caliber 98.00

- Caliber 25 - mechanical watch directly derived in 1954 from the original Lip R25 pattern; was used in the first series of the Spartak and was gradually replaced by a 50 gauge
- Caliber 50 - mechanical with manual winding, derived in 1954 from the model Lip R25. 15 stones, eccentric second. In production until 1971.
- Caliber 52 - mechanical with manual winding, derived in 1955 from caliber 50, added data ring. In production until 1971
- Caliber 55 - mechanical with manual winding, newly solved central second hand with indirect drive, 16 stones. In production in 1958–1971.
- Caliber 57 - mechanical with manual winding, derived from caliber 55, added data ring. In production in 1958–1971.
- Caliber 66 - mechanical with manual winding, new caliber design derived from the Swiss model ETA 1080, 17 stones. In production in 1965–1993.
- Caliber 68 - mechanical with manual winding, derived from caliber 66, data ring added. In production in 1969–1993.
- Caliber 70 - mechanical with manual winding from 1971, not introduced into production.
- Caliber 80 - mechanical with manual winding, 17 stones. In production in 1971–1993.
- Caliber 96 - mechanical with automatic winding, 21 stones. In production in 1971–1989.
- Caliber 97 - mechanical with automatic winding, 21 stones, date wreath with Day-Date display. In production in 1979–1989.
- Caliber 200 - quartz, 7 stones. In production in 1988–1995.
- Caliber 210 - quartz, 7 stones, data wreath. In production in 1993–1995.

=== In production ===
- Caliber 105 - mechanical with automatic winding, 24 jewels. In production since 2017.
- Caliber 103 - mechanical with manual winding, 19 jewels. In production since 2017.
- Caliber 98.00/98.01 - mechanical with automatic winding, 22 jewels. In production since 2009/2013.
- Caliber 95 - mechanical with automatic winding, 22 jewels. In production since 2013.
- Caliber 94/94.01/93 - mechanical with manual winding, 17 jewels. In production since 2009/2010/2013.
- Caliber 75 - mechanical with automatic winding, 26 jewels. In production since 2019.
