= Vladimír Suchánek =

Czech artist (1933–2021)

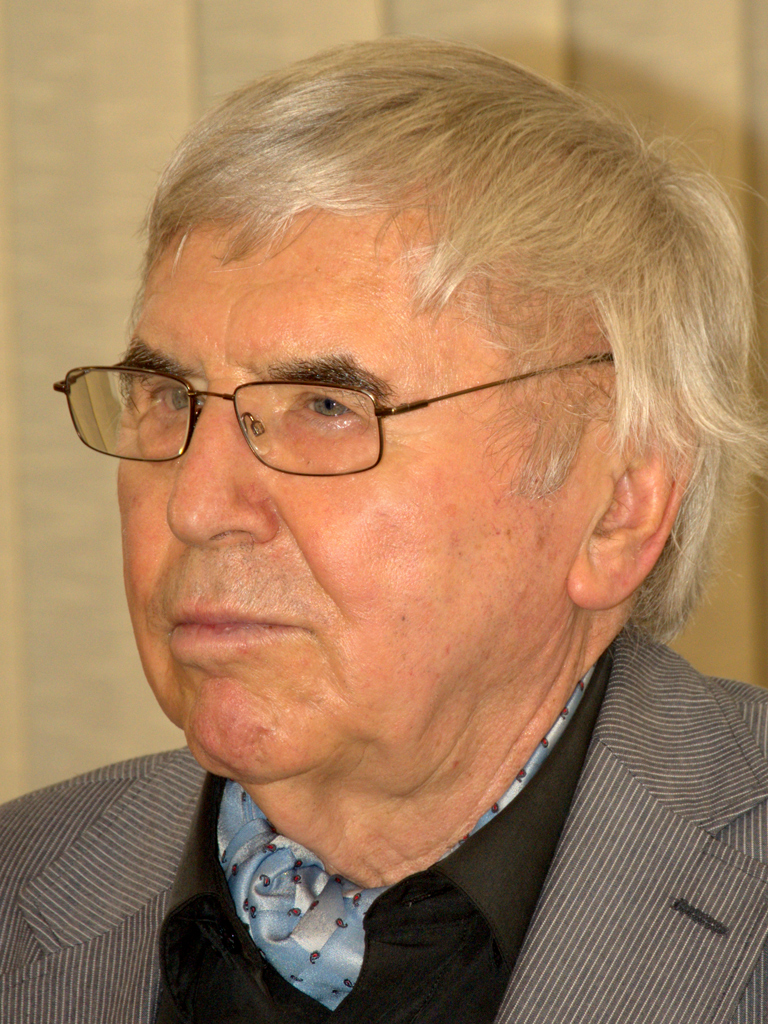
- Suchánek in 2013
- Born: 12 February 1933; Nové Město nad Metují
- Died: 25 January 2021 (aged 87)
- Education: Charles University, Academy of Fine Arts
- Occupations: Graphic artist, postage stamp designer
- Organization: Hollar Association of Czech Graphic Artists

Vladimír Suchánek (12 February 1933 – 25 January 2021) was a Czech graphic artist and postage stamp designer.

== Early life and career ==
Suchánek was born on 12 February 1933 in Nové Město nad Metují. He studied at Charles University in Prague between 1952 and 1954 and then at the Academy of Fine Arts in Prague until 1960, where he specialized in graphic arts under Professor Vladimír Silovský. In 1977, he became a member of the European Academy of Sciences and Arts in Vienna.

Suchánek played a notable role in the 1990 revival of the Hollar Association of Czech Graphic Artists, whose activities had been suspended since the 1970s. He was elected chairman of the Hollar Association in 1995, serving for twenty years, then as honorary chairman of the association until the end of his life.

Suchánek was widely regarded for his expertise in color lithography and achieved international recognition in this field, earning many awards for his work.

In 2006, Suchánek was awarded the Czech Medal of Merit, third grade, for his contributions to the arts.

== Stamp designer ==
Suchánek designed several stamps for the Czech Republic, most notably the 1997 stamp honoring the 1000th anniversary of the death of St. Adalbert. This stamp was issued in the Czech Republic, Hungary, Germany, Poland, and Vatican City.

== Shows ==
By 2008, he held 146 one-man shows in the Czech Republic and abroad (in the Netherlands, Belgium, Germany, Japan, the United States, Sweden, Denmark, Poland, and Slovakia). He took part in almost 300 exhibitions, including international biennials of graphic art in Ljubljana, Kraków, Paris, Trieste, Grenchen, Buenos Aires, Frechen, Bradford, Biella, Rijeka, Segovia, Tokyo, Heidelberg, Nuremberg, Malbork, Łódź, Frederikshavn, Berlin, Miami, Toronto, Fredrikstad, and Beijing.
