= Karel Klapálek =

Czech legioneer and army general (1893–1984)

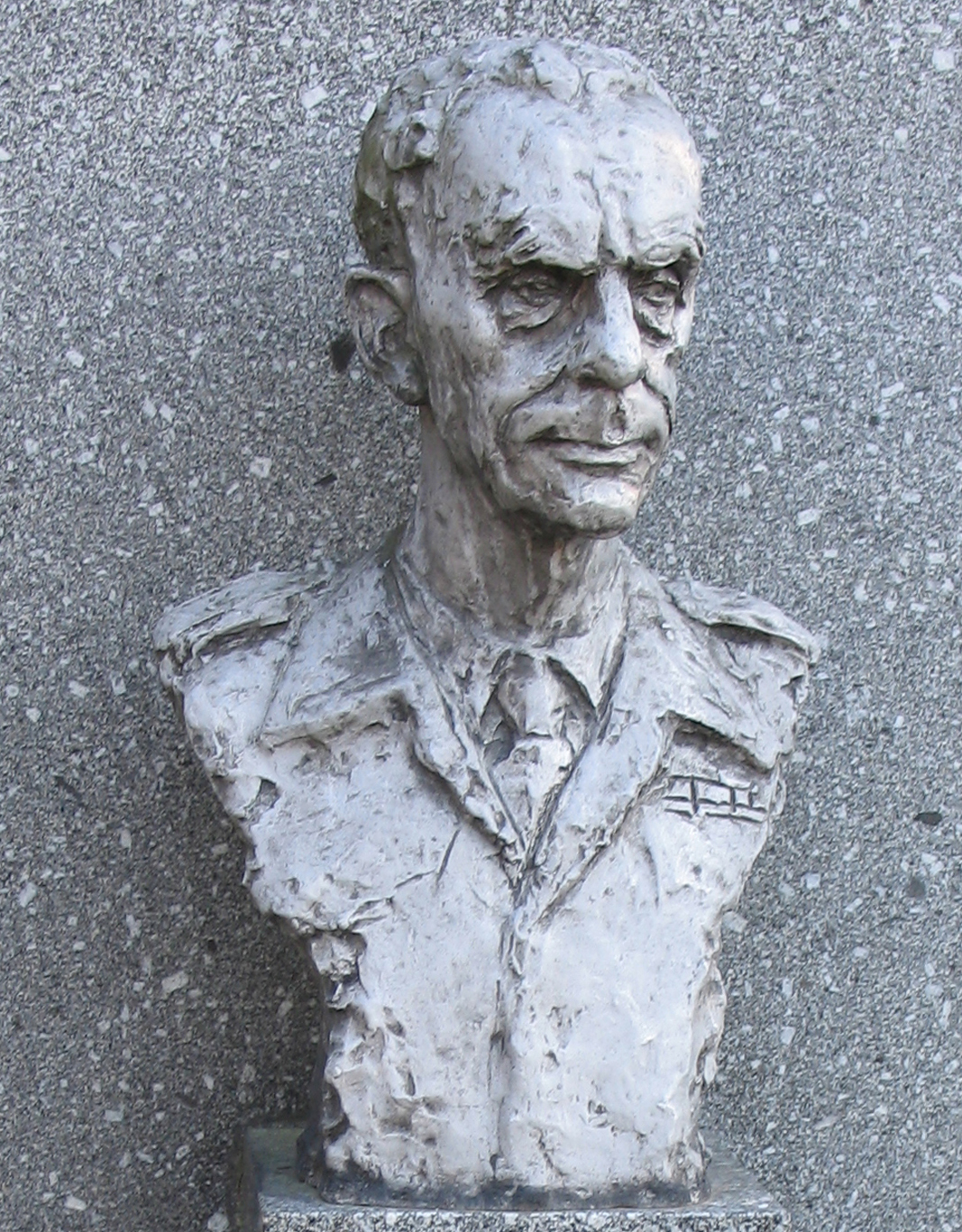
Bust of Karel Klapálek at Dukla Pass

Karel Klapálek, CBE, DSO (25 May 1893 – 18 November 1984) was a Czech military leader. He was general of the Czechoslovak Army and a veteran of the Czechoslovak Legion in the Russian Empire. He fought in both World Wars and was decorated with numerous national honours.

== Early life ==
Klapálek was born in Nové Město nad Metují in north-eastern Bohemia, then part of Austria-Hungary. His father, a railwayman, died when Karel was eight. His mother was widowed with five children and the family was very poor. Karel went to primary school in the town of Kralupy nad Vltavou and high school in Prague, graduating in 1911 and taking a job as an accountant in a small factory that made automatic pumps.

== First World War ==
In 1915 Klapálek joined the 8th Regiment of the Imperial-Royal Landwehr and was posted to Halicz in Galicia. He fought on the Russian front and was captured by Russian forces on 23 September 1915.

Klapálek enlisted in the Czechoslovak Legion in Tashkent in 1916, and on 6 August 1916 he joined the 1st Artillery Regiment as a soldier. After the successful Battle of Zborov he was promoted to warrant officer. He served in the 3rd Czechoslovak Infantry Regiment, fighting in most of the battles of the Czechoslovak Legion in Russia before contracting tuberculosis. Klapálek returned to Czechoslovakia with the Legion in 1920.

== 1920–1939 ==
After World War I, Klapálek became a commissioned officer and helped to establish the army of the newly-founded First Czechoslovak Republic. He served in Plzeň, Prague, Michalovce, and Uzhhorod, where he met his future wife Olga Košutová (born 8 March 1901). He then served in Milovice and at the Military Academy in Hranice.

In the interwar period, Klapálek married Olga, and their daughter Olga was born on 24 March 1926. Olga Klapálková kept a diary, which later provided the basis for a book in which she described life in a Nazi concentration camp in Svatobořice near Kyjov, where she was held in the Second World War. Later in life Olga also published her husband's memoirs, Voják vypravuje.

== Second World War ==
After Nazi Germany imposed the Protectorate of Bohemia and Moravia in March 1939, Klapálek joined a Czech military anti-Nazi resistance organization Obrana národa (Protection of the Nation) in České Budějovice. After the organization was destroyed in 1940 he fled the country and reached Mandatory Palestine, where he joined the 4th Czechoslovak Infantry Regiment, later reorganized as the Czechoslovak 11th Infantry Battalion (East), with Klapálek as its commander. The battalion fought in the Allied invasion of Syria and Lebanon in June and July 1941, and was then stationed on the Turkish border in August. From October to December 1941 the battalion fought in the defence of Tobruk under the command of the Polish Independent Carpathian Rifle Brigade.

After its success at Tobruk the battalion was withdrawn to the rear. In May 1942 it was reorganized as the 200th Czechoslovak Light Anti-Aircraft Regiment, with Klapálek remaining as its commander. The regiment returned to the Levant, where it defended Haifa, Beirut, and Az-Zeeb. Early in 1943 it returned to Tobruk, which it defended until June.

In July 1943 the regiment was transferred by sea to Great Britain, where it became part of the Czechoslovak Independent Armoured Brigade. Klapálek reached Britain in August and was made second-in-command of the brigade.

From March 1944 Klapálek was stationed in London as head of Department I of the Ministry of Defence of the Czechoslovak government-in-exile. In August 1944 he volunteered to the Eastern Front. In September he was promoted to brigade general and commanded the 3rd Czechoslovak Independent Brigade, including in the Battle of the Dukla Pass.

During the Battle of Liptovský Mikuláš, on 3 February 1945, Klapálek was badly injured by an enemy artillery shell. While in hospital, he was promoted to commander of the whole Czechoslovak Army Corps. In his absence, the acting commander was general Bohumil Boček. Klapálek then successfully led the army in the Battle of Malá Fatra, crossing of Váh and the liberation of Moravia. On 17 May 1945, Klapálek led the Victory Parade in Prague while riding a white horse.

== 1945–56 ==
Between 1945 and 1950 Klapálek served as an army officer in Prague. Along with Svoboda he supported the Communist coup d'état of February 1948, by establishing the Central Office of the National Front (Czech: Ústřední výbor Národní Fronty). He joined the Communist Party in June 1948.

In the political trials of Czechoslovak soldiers who had served with Western forces, Klapálek tried to protect his former colleagues. In 1949 he received a threatening letter encouraging him to leave the country. Klapálek did not take it seriously, but in 1951 he was sent into retirement. After the high-profile political trial of Rudolf Slánský in 1952, the Communists confiscated all of Klapálek's property and imprisoned him in Valdice Prison. He was disgraced, expelled from the Communist Party, and deprived of his civil rights. In 1954 he was convicted of sabotage. Klapálek was released from prison in 1956 after the Soviet marshals Georgy Zhukov and Ivan Konev spoke in his defence, but he was not rehabilitated until 1968.

== Memoirs and national honours ==
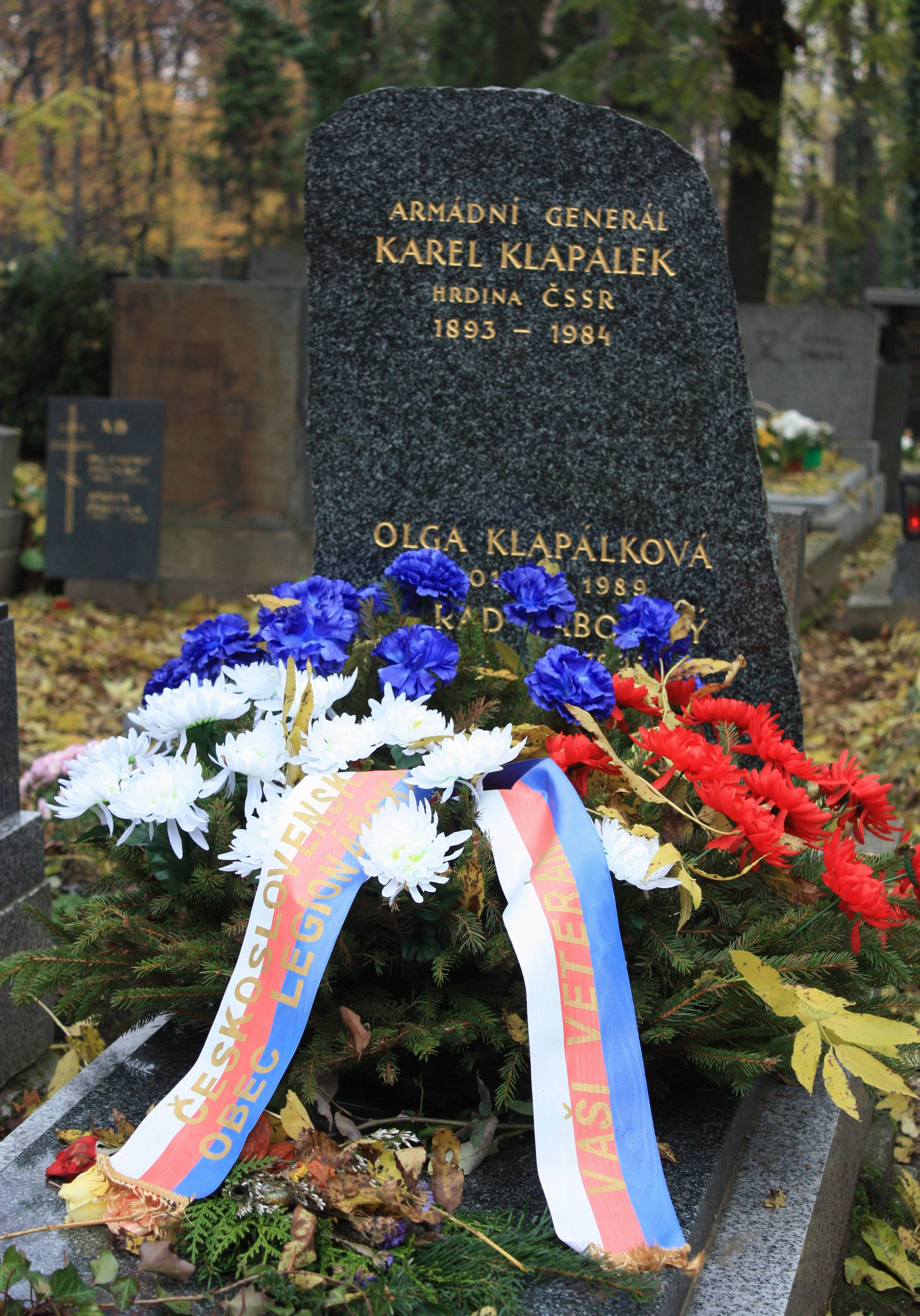
Headstone of Karel Klapálek and Olga Klapálková at Olšany Cemetery in Prague

Klapálek published his memoirs in a book called Ozvěny bojů in 1968. Ludvik Svoboda, the president of Czechoslovakia, awarded him with the title Hero of the ČSR after having already received the Order of the Red Star and the Order of the 25th February (cs). Klapálek was designated an "honourable citizen" of his hometown, Nové Město nad Metují. In 1984 he was awarded his last National Honour, the Order of the Red Flag.

General Klapálek died 18 November 1984 at the age of 91. He is buried in Olšany Cemetery in Prague.

In 2009 Klapálek was nominated for the Order of the White Lion in memoriam. A public debate followed over whether he deserved the Order or not, given his actions in 1948. Czech President Václav Klaus eventually declined to give him the Honour.

=== National honours ===
- Order of the Red Star
- Order of the 25th February
- Hero of the Czechoslovak Socialist Republic
- Order of the Red Banner (Czechoslovakia)

== Sources ==
- Brod, Toman (1966). Tobrucké krysy (in Czech). Prague: Naše vojsko.
- Klapálek, Karel (1966). Ozvěny bojů (in Czech). Prague: Naše vojsko.
- Klapálková, Olga (1948). Voják vypravuje (in Czech). Brno: Družstvo Moravského kala spisovatelů.
- Kraus, Stanislav (1996). Za svobodou třemi světadíly: vzpomínky z let 1939-1945 (in Czech). Litomyšl: Augusta. OCLC 84550459.
- Kux, Jan (2005). Pomníky zůstávají, Frangmenty z výstavy k 60. výročí osvobození (in Czech). Brno: Onufrius.
- Ressel, Alfréd (1975). Mé cesty válkou (in Czech). Prague: Mladá fronta.
- Pejřil, Vaclav. Sborník fotografií a textů k 90-tému výročí narození arm. gen. Karla Klapálka (in Czech).
- Sommr, Josef (1992). Od Tobruku do Plzně (in Czech). Prague: Naše Vojsko.
- Stehlík, Eduard (2009). The Heart of the Army, General Staff 1919–2009. Prague: Ministerstvo obrany České republiky. ISBN 978-80-7278-516-2.
