= Ploštín =

Coordinates: 49°03′22″N 19°36′23″E

Ploštín (Hungarian: Plostin) is a settlement and a borough of Liptovský Mikuláš in northern Slovakia, located 3 km south of the city center. In 2009, Ploštín had a population of 481.

== Geography ==
Ploštín lies in Liptov Basin benath Low Tatras. The cadastral territory of the formerly independent municipality is spread between Roháčka, Jamy, Ploštín and Tretiny hills peaking at between 676 and 827 meters above sea level. It borders the municipal boroughs of Iľanovo in the east and Demänová borough in the west. The settlement center is located 635 meters above sea level.

=== Rivers ===
Ploštínka stream flows though the settlement in the south-west to north-east direction.

== History ==
Ploštín is first mentioned in 1355. Archaeological findings at Rohačka evidence settlements dating to late Bronze Age. After 1976, the city became a borough of Liptovský Mikuláš. In mid-15th century, Ploštín was considered a part of Liptovský Hrádok municipality.

== Culture and services ==
=== Historical landmarks ===
- Lutheran prayer room with a bell tower: a single level brick building dating to early 20th century. The bell tower is square based and topped with a baroque metal decorations.

=== Transport ===
The borough is served by bus lines 3 and 4 ran by MAD Liptovský Mikuláš.

=== Emergency services ===
Despite its low population, Ploštín is protected by a voluntary fire brigade.

== In pop culture ==
A punk and folk rock band Ploštín Punk established in 1992 and is named after the settlement.

== Sources ==
- ULIČNÝ, Ferdinand (ed.): Ploštín. Liptovský Mikuláš : Tranoscius, 2007. 213 s. ISBN 978-80-7140-273-2

== External references ==
- Oficiálna stránka mesta Liptovský Mikuláš
