= Korejovce =

- Municipality
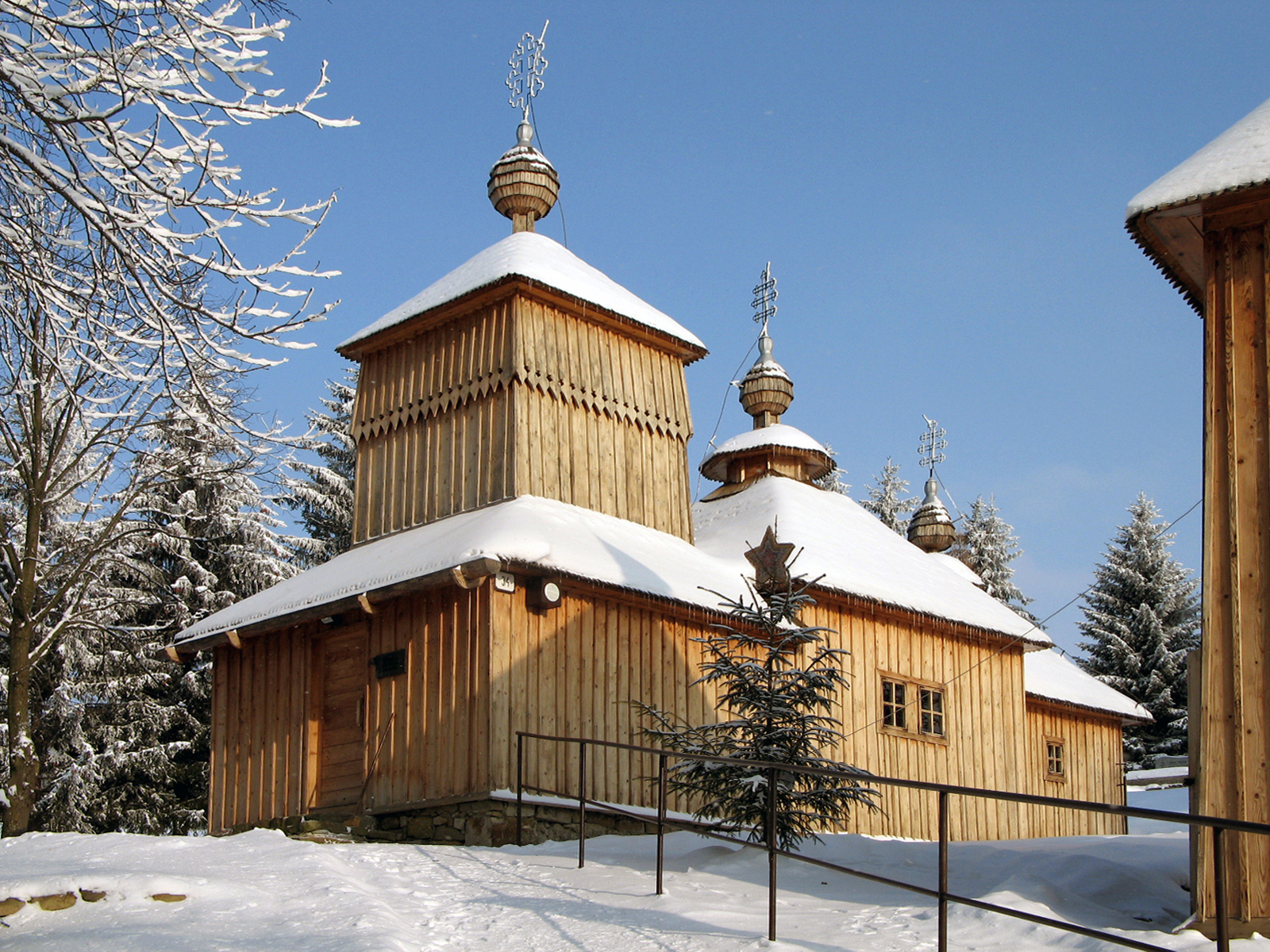
- Wooden church in Korejovce

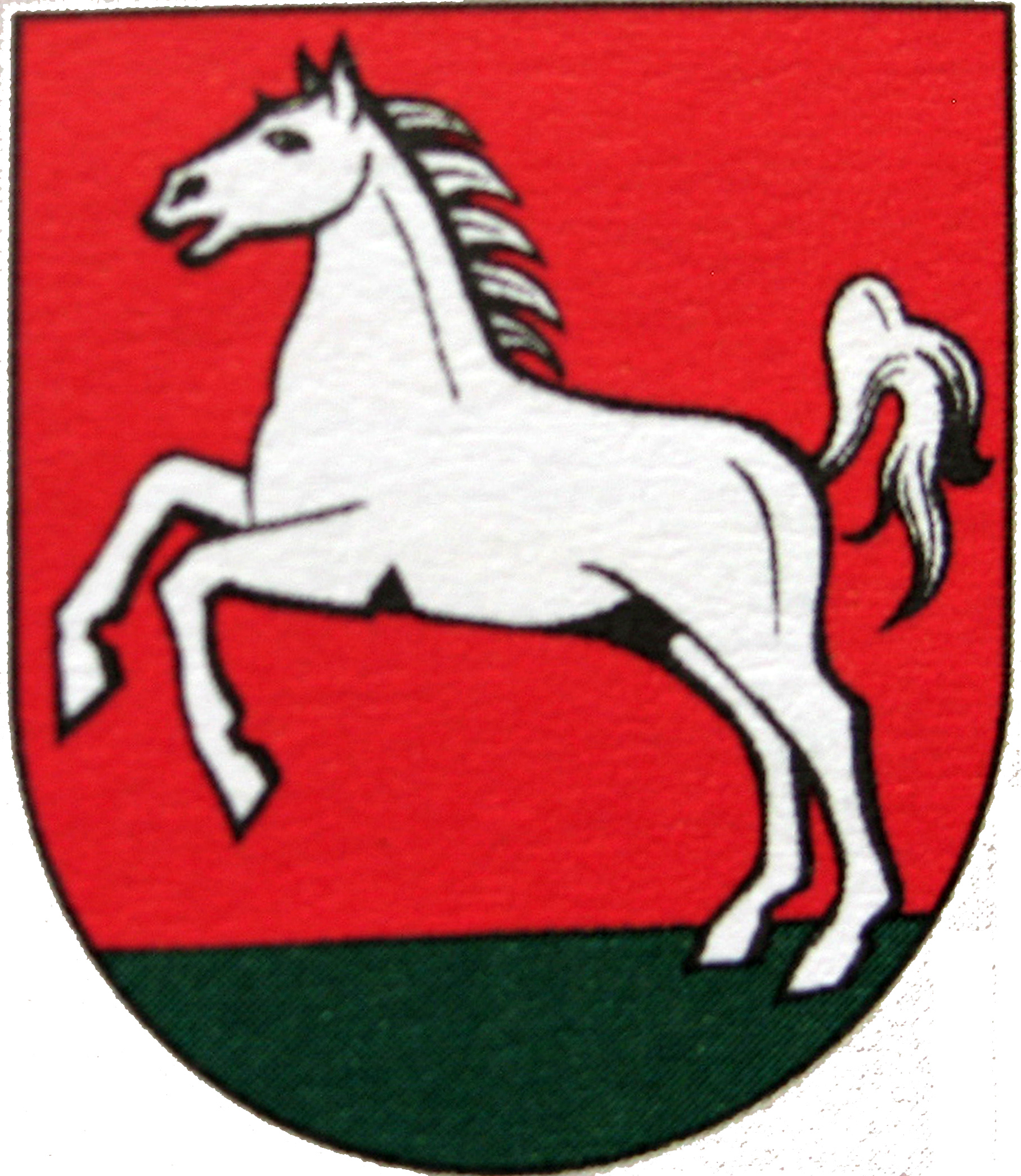
- Flag Coat of arms

- Location of Korejovce in the Prešov Region Location of Korejovce in Slovakia
- Coordinates: 49.38°N 21.64°E
- Country: Slovakia
- Region: Prešov Region
- District: Svidník District
- First mentioned: 1600

Area
  - Total: 4.06 km^{2} (1.57 sq mi)
- Elevation: 324 m (1,063 ft)

Population (2025)
  - Total: 67
- Time zone: UTC+1 (CET)
  - Summer (DST): UTC+2 (CEST)
- Postal code: 900 4
- Area code: +421 54
- Vehicle registration plate (until 2022): SK
- Website: obeckorejovce.webnode.sk

Korejovce (Rusyn: Кореївцї; Hungarian: Koróc, until 1899: Korejócz) is a village and municipality in Svidník District in the Prešov Region of north-eastern Slovakia.

== History ==
In historical records the village was first mentioned in 1600.

== Geography ==
The municipality lies at an altitude of 324 metres (1,063 ft) and covers an area of 4.06 km^{2} (1.57 sq mi) (2025).

== Population ==
Population statistic (10 years)
Year	1995	2005	2015	2025
Count	63	65	80	67
Difference		+3.17%	+23.07%	−16.25%

Population statistic
Year	2024	2025
Count	69	67
Difference		−2.89%

It has a population of 67 people (31 December 2025).

=== Ethnicity ===
Census 2021 (1+ %)
Ethnicity	Number	Fraction
Slovak	68	89.47%
Rusyn	35	46.05%
Ukrainian	1	1.31%
Not found out	1	1.31%
Hungarian	1	1.31%
Total	76	

In year 2021 was 76 people by ethnicity 68 as Slovak, 35 as Rusyn, 1 as Ukrainian, 1 as Not found out and 1 as Hungarian.

Note on population: The difference values of population numbers in the table "Population statistic" and in the sections "Ethnicity" & "Religion" is caused by the use of various statistical methods.

=== Religion ===
Census 2021 (1+ %)
Religion	Number	Fraction
Greek Catholic Church	54	71.05%
None	13	17.11%
Roman Catholic Church	8	10.53%
Jewish community	1	1.32%
Total	76	

In year 2021 was 76 people by religion 54 from Greek Catholic Church, 13 from None, 8 from Roman Catholic Church and 1 from Jewish community.

== Genealogical resources ==
The records for genealogical research are available at the state archive "Statny Archiv in Presov, Slovakia"

- Greek Catholic church records (births/marriages/deaths): 1787-1950 (parish B)

== See also ==
- List of municipalities and towns in Slovakia
