= Hero of the Czechoslovak Socialist Republic =

Hero of the Czechoslovak Socialist Republic Hrdina Československé socialistické Republiky
- Type: Medal signifying award of the title Hero of the Czechoslovak Republic
- Awarded for: extraordinary merits for the republic connected with a heroic achievement or repeated achievements
- Presented by: (Czechoslovakia) Czechoslovak Socialist Republic
- Status: no longer awarded
- Established: 1955
- First award: 25 November 1965
- Final award: 7 January 1983

Highlights
- Total: 31

The title of the Hero of the Czechoslovak Republic was established in 1955. The name of the title was changed to Hero of the Czechoslovak Socialist Republic in 1960. It was awarded 31 times to some Czechoslovak war heroes, to the general and later president Ludvík Svoboda, to the Czechoslovak president Gustáv Husák, to the Czech cosmonaut Vladimír Remek, to various Soviet generals and marshals, and to Leonid Brezhnev. The never-awarded 32nd medal has been given to the Czech National Museum.

The title was awarded by the government to honor extraordinary merits for the republic connected with a heroic achievement or repeated achievements.

The Hero was always also awarded the Order of Klement Gottwald in similar fashion to how a Hero of the Soviet Union was also always awarded the Order of Lenin, a Hero of the People's Republic of Bulgaria was also awarded the Order of Georgi Dimitrov, and a Hero of the German Democratic Republic was also awarded the Order of Karl Marx.

The medal was worn on the left breast side above all the Czechoslovak awards or their ribbons, always in natura and in front of the Gold Star of the Hero of Socialist Labor (Czechoslovakia).

The title was canceled as a result of the 1989 Velvet Revolution, when the government of the new Czech and Slovak Federative Republic on 7 October 1990 enacted a law setting up a new, de-communized honors system. No new awards of the title have been permitted thenceforth, but existing awardees were (and are) still permitted to wear their medals.

== Recipients ==
- Josef Frank
- Gustáv Husák (3 times)
- Ludvík Svoboda (3 times)
- Vladimír Remek
- Jan Šverma
- Vendelín Opatrný
- Karol Šmidke
- Vladimír Clementis
- Leonid Iljich Brezhnev (3 times)
- Ivan Stepanovich Konev
- Karel Klapálek
- Andrei Antonovich Grechko
- Ivan Ignatevich Jakubovski
- Dmitriy Fjodorovich Ustinov
- Matvej Vasiljevich Zacharov
- Jurij Viktorovich Romanenko
- Georgi Michajlovich Grechko
- Alexei Alexandrovich Gubarev
- Kiril Semjonovich Moskalenko
- Andrey Yeryomenko
- Dmitriy Danilovich Leljusenko
