= Týniště nad Orlicí =

- Town
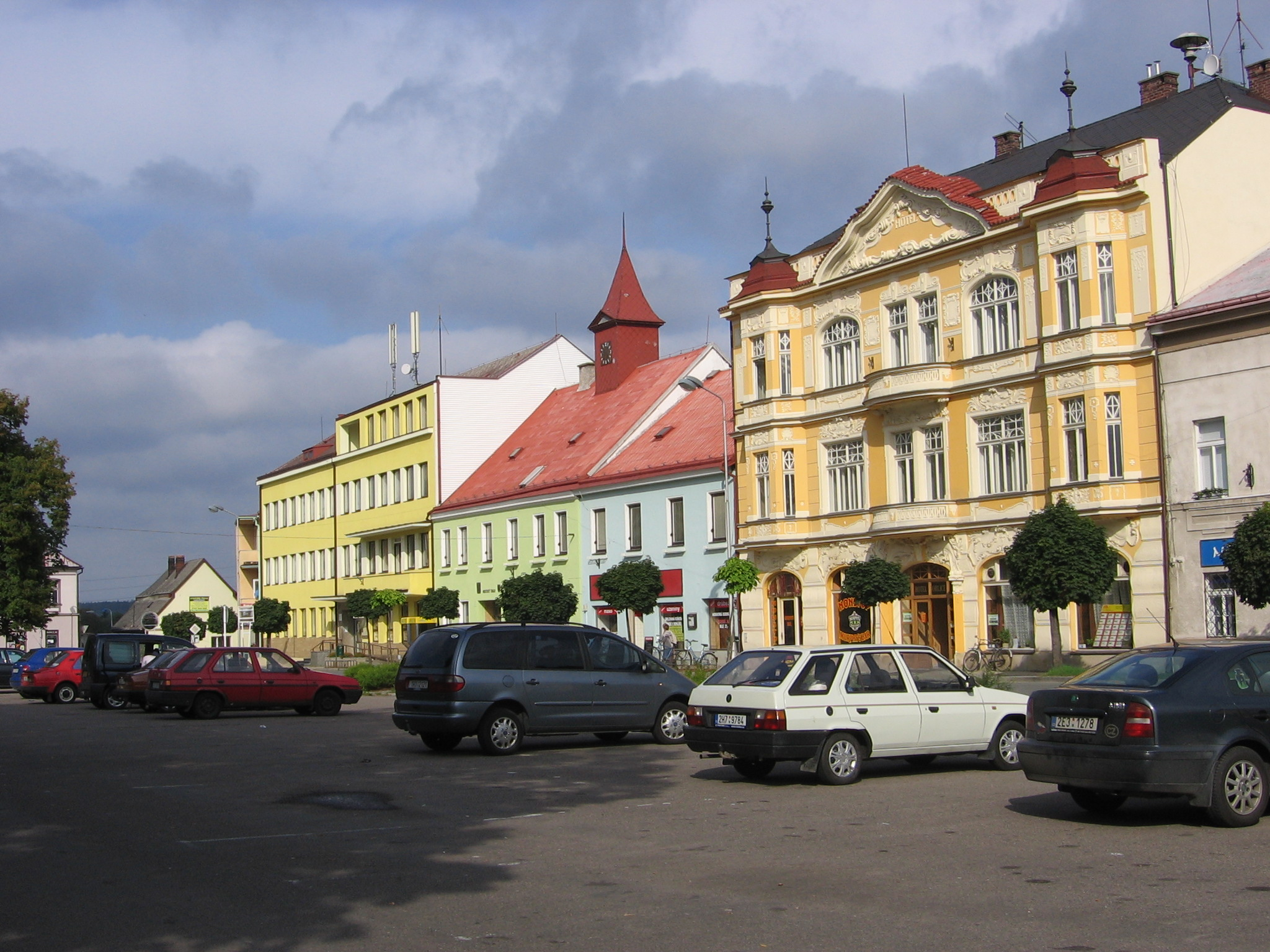
- Town square

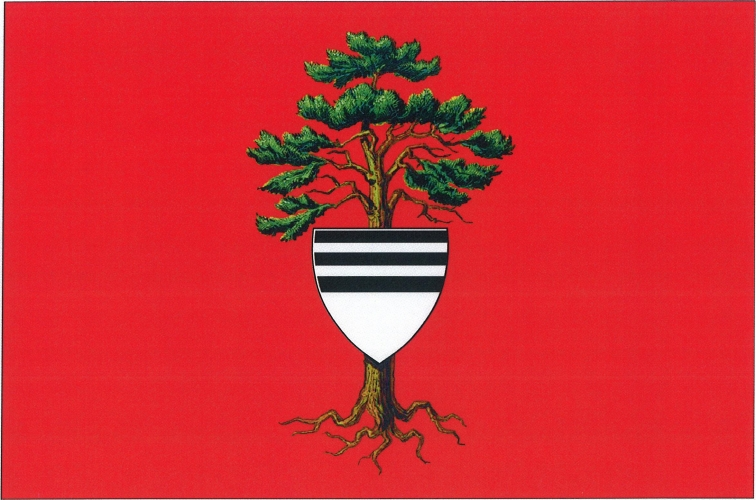
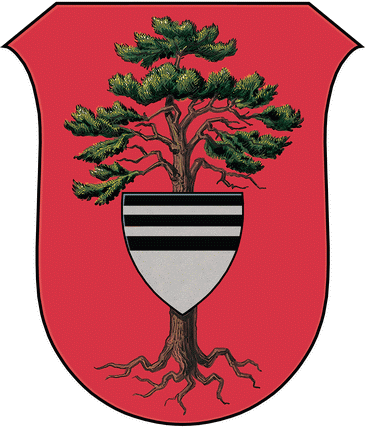
- Flag Coat of arms

- Location in the Czech Republic
- Coordinates: 50°9′12″N 16°4′43″E
- Country: Czech Republic
- Region: Hradec Králové
- District: Rychnov nad Kněžnou
- First mentioned: 1361

Government
  - Mayor: Michal Procházka

Area
  - Total: 52.45 km^{2} (20.25 sq mi)
- Elevation: 253 m (830 ft)

Population (2026-01-01)
  - Total: 6,133
  - Density: 116.9/km^{2} (302.8/sq mi)
- Time zone: UTC+1 (CET)
  - Summer (DST): UTC+2 (CEST)
- Postal code: 517 21
- Website: www.tyniste.cz

Týniště nad Orlicí (Czech pronunciation: [ˈtiːɲɪʃcɛ ˈnat orlɪtsiː]) is a town in Rychnov nad Kněžnou District in the Hradec Králové Region of the Czech Republic. It has about 6,100 inhabitants. The town is located on the Orlice River in the Orlice Table. The main landmark of the town is the Church of Saint Nicholas.

== Administrative division ==
Týniště nad Orlicí consists of six municipal parts (in brackets population according to the 2021 census):

- Týniště nad Orlicí (4,918)
- Křivice (187)
- Petrovice (218)
- Petrovičky (181)
- Rašovice (152)
- Štěpánovsko (256)

== Etymology ==
The name Týniště has its root in the Old Czech words týn (related to English 'town'), meaning 'fortified settlement', and tyniště, meaning 'fortified place'.

== Geography ==
Týniště nad Orlicí is located about 14 kilometres (9 mi) west of Rychnov nad Kněžnou and 17 km (11 mi) southeast of Hradec Králové. It lies in the Orlice Table. The highest point is at 445 m (1,460 ft) above sea level. The town is situated on the right bank of the Orlice River.

== History ==
The first written mention of Týniště nad Orlicí is from 1361. Before 1419, it became a market town. In 1914, it was promoted to a town by Franz Joseph I.

== Demographics ==
Historical population

| Year | Pop. | ±% |
|---|---|---|
| 1869 | 2,986 | — |
| 1880 | 3,165 | +6.0% |
| 1890 | 3,352 | +5.9% |
| 1900 | 3,420 | +2.0% |
| 1910 | 3,938 | +15.1% |

| Year | Pop. | ±% |
|---|---|---|
| 1921 | 4,013 | +1.9% |
| 1930 | 4,602 | +14.7% |
| 1950 | 4,443 | −3.5% |
| 1961 | 5,271 | +18.6% |
| 1970 | 6,010 | +14.0% |

| Year | Pop. | ±% |
|---|---|---|
| 1980 | 6,606 | +9.9% |
| 1991 | 6,482 | −1.9% |
| 2001 | 6,286 | −3.0% |
| 2011 | 6,111 | −2.8% |
| 2021 | 5,912 | −3.3% |

Source: Censuses

== Transport ==
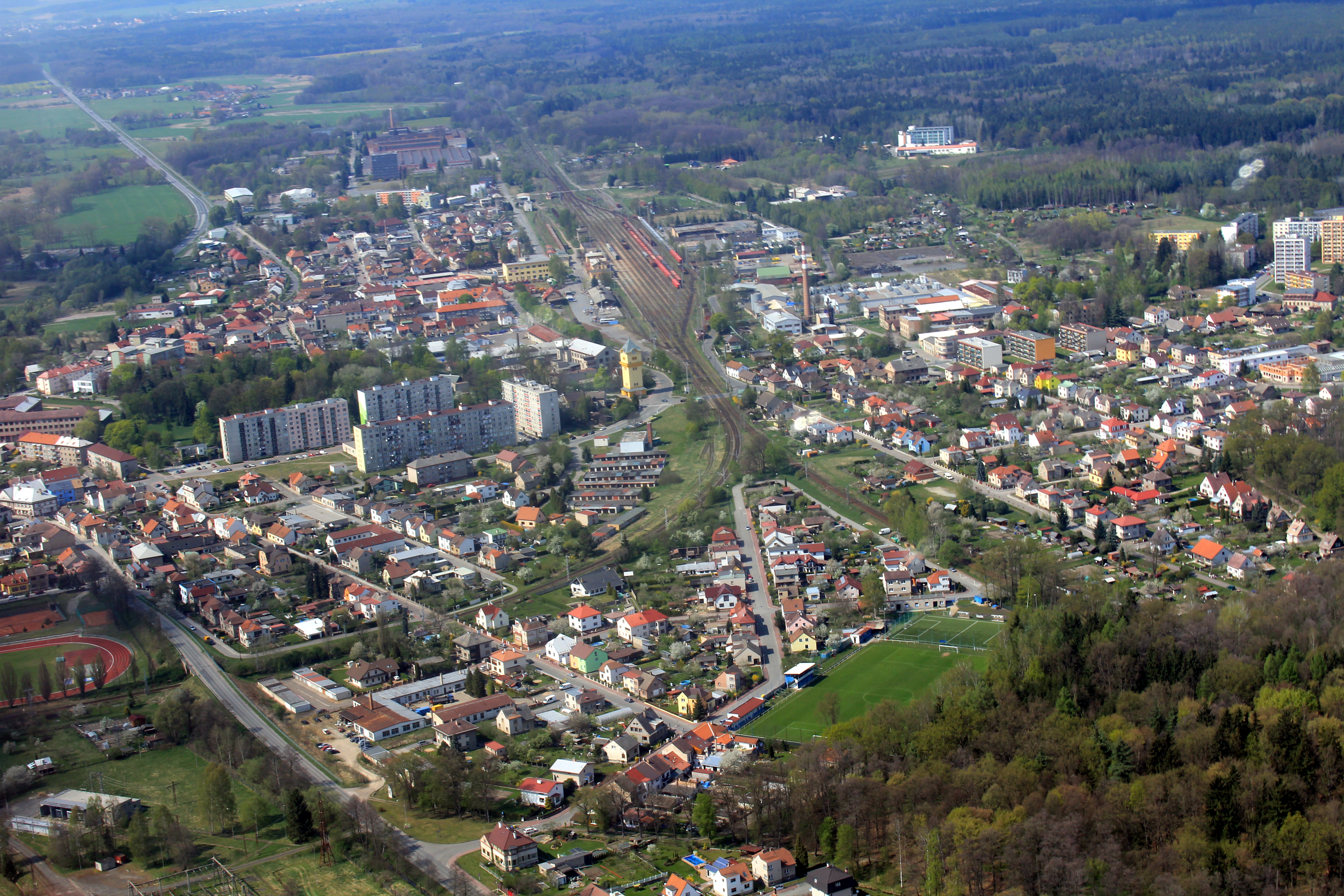
Aerial view

The I/11 road from Hradec Králové to Šumperk runs through the town.

Týniště nad Orlicí is a railway junction. The town is located on the railway lines Hradec Králové–Letohrad, Náchod–Choceň, Rychnov nad Kněžnou–Týniště nad Orlicí and Chlumec nad Cidlinou–Týniště nad Orlicí.

== Sights ==
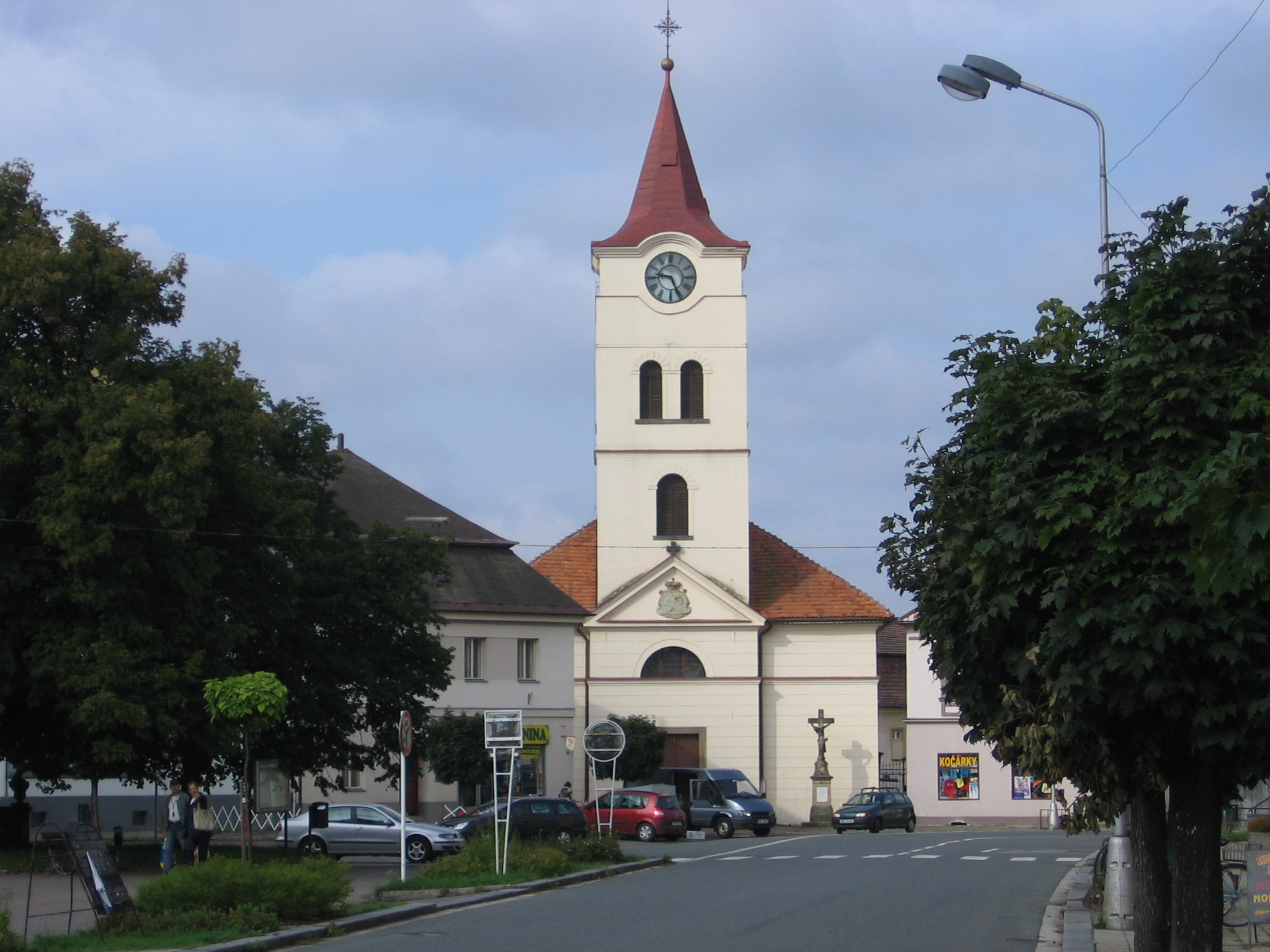
Church of Saint Nicholas

The main landmark of Týniště nad Orlicí is the Church of Saint Nicholas. The current building was constructed in 1692, after the old wooden church was destroyed by a fire. The widest part of the church was built in 1788. A part of the church complex is the Baroque rectory from 1739.

== Notable people ==
- Jan Adolf Brandeis (1818–1872), painter and photographer
- Vendelín Opatrný (1908–1944), army officer
- George Chaloupka (1932–2011) Czech-Australian expert on Indigenous Australian rock art

== Twin towns – sister cities ==
Týniště nad Orlicí is twinned with:

- Čierny Balog, Slovakia
