= List of monitors of World War II =

A monitor is a class of relatively small warship that is lightly armoured, often provided with disproportionately large guns, and originally designed for coastal warfare. The term "monitor" grew to include breastwork monitors, the largest class of riverine warcraft known as river monitors, and was sometimes used as a generic term for any turreted ship. In the early 20th century, the term "monitor" included shallow-draft armoured shore bombardment vessels, particularly those of the Royal Navy: the Lord Clive-class monitors carried guns that fired the heaviest shells ever used at sea and saw action against German targets during World War I. Two small Royal Navy monitors from the First World War, Erebus and Terror survived to fight in the Second World War. When the requirement for shore support and strong shallow-water coastal defence returned, new monitors and variants such as coastal defence ships were built (e.g. the British Roberts-class monitors). Allied monitors saw service in the Mediterranean in support of the British Eighth Army's desert and Italian campaigns. They were part of the offshore bombardment for the Invasion of Normandy in 1944. They were also used to clear the German-mined River Scheldt by the British to utilize the port of Antwerp. The German, Yugoslav, Croatian, Romanian, Hungarian and Czech armed forces operated river monitors that saw combat during World War II.

See also List of ships of World War II, which contains major military vessels of the war, arranged alphabetically and by type. The list includes armed vessels that served during the war and in the immediate aftermath, inclusive of localized ongoing combat operations, garrison surrenders, post-surrender occupation, colony re-occupation, troop and prisoner repatriation, to the end of 1945. For smaller vessels, see also list of World War II ships of less than 1000 tons. Some uncompleted Axis ships are included, out of historic interest. Ships are designated to the country under which they operated for the longest period of the Second World War, regardless of where they were built or previous service history.

List of monitors of World War II
Ship	Country or organization	Class	Type	Displacement (tons)	First commissioned	Fate
Alexandru Lahovari	Royal Romanian Navy	Brătianu	river monitor			captured by Soviets 2 September 1944, returned 1951, put in reserve 1957, scrapped 1959
Abercrombie	Royal Navy	Roberts	monitor	7,850	5 May 1943	scrapped 1954
Bechelaren	Kriegsmarine		river monitor	214	1 August 1932	Originally laid down and commissioned as the President Masaryk for the Czechoslovak Naval Forces. Captured in 1938 by Germany and renamed Bechelaren. Returned to Czechoslovakia in 1947. scrapped 1978.
Claverhouse	Royal Navy	M15	monitor/training ship	540	July 1915	scrapped 21 April 1959
Drava	Royal Yugoslav Navy	Enns	river monitor	536	15 April 1920	scuttled 11 April 1941
Erebus	Royal Navy	Erebus	monitor	7,300	2 September 1916	scrapped July 1946
Flyagin	Soviet Navy	Zheleznyakov	river monitor	230	30 December 1936	scuttled 18 September 1941
GM 194/Biber	Regia Marina; Kriegsmarine		monitor/floating battery	2,854	1 April 1917	scrapped 1945-1946
Ion C. Brătianu	Royal Romanian Navy	Brătianu	river monitor			captured by Soviets 27 August 1944, returned 1951, put in reserve 1957, scrapped 1959
Khasan	Soviet Navy	Khasan	River monitor	1,704	1 December 1942	Originally to be named Lazo, renamed Khasan on 25 September 1940. Scrapped 23 March 1960.
Lascăr Catargiu	Royal Romanian Navy	Brătianu	river monitor	680	1907	Built at the Galați Shipyard in Romania, armament during World War II consisted of 3 x 120 mm guns in armoured turrets, 1 x 76 mm AA gun, 2 x 47 mm guns and two machine guns, 75 mm of armor protected the sides, deck, and turrets, sunk 24 August 1944
Levachev	Soviet Navy	Zheleznyakov	river monitor	230	27 October 1936	scuttled 18 September 1941
Martynov	Soviet Navy	Zheleznyakov	river monitor	230	8 December 1936	scuttled 18 September 1941
Mihail Kogălniceanu	Royal Romanian Navy	Brătianu	monitor	680	1907	sunk 24 August 1944
Morava/Bosna	Royal Yugoslav Navy; Navy of the Independent State of Croatia	Körös	river monitor	448	15 April 1920	scuttled 11 April 1941, raised by Croatia as Bosna, sunk June 1944
Parnaiba	Brazilian Navy		river monitor	620	9 March 1938	in service
Perekop	Soviet Navy	Khasan	River monitor	1,704	1 December 1942	Originally to be named Simbirtsev, renamed Perekop on 25 September 1940. Scrapped 23 March 1960.
Roberts	Royal Navy	Roberts	monitor	8,100	27 October 1941	scrapped June 1965
Rostovtsev	Soviet Navy	Zheleznyakov	river monitor	230	13 May 1937	scuttled 18 September 1941
Sava	Royal Yugoslav Navy; Navy of the Independent State of Croatia	Temes	river monitor	440	15 April 1920	scuttled 11 April 1941, raised by Croatia, scuttled 8 September 1944, raised by Yugoslavia, decommissioned 1962
Sivash	Soviet Navy	Khasan	River monitor	1,704	31 October 1946	Originally to be named Seryshev, renamed Sivash on 25 September 1940. Disarmed and converted to an accommodation ship September 1960. Scrapped 28 February 1968.
Terror	Royal Navy	Erebus	monitor	7,300	6 August 1916	sunk 24 February 1941
Vardar	Royal Yugoslav Navy	Sava	river monitor	580	15 April 1920	scuttled 11 April 1941
Zheleznyakov	Soviet Navy	Zheleznyakov	river monitor	230	27 October 1936	Decommissioned 10 September 1960. Preserved as a war memorial 10 July 1967 in Kiev.
Zhemchuzhin	Soviet Navy	Zheleznyakov	river monitor	230	27 October 1936	scuttled 12 August 1941

== Bibliography ==
- "NavSource Naval History".
- "Warship that fired first shots of WWI now a gravel barge in Serbia". Fox News. EFE. 14 April 2014. Archived from the original on October 25, 2014.
- Ader, Clement (2003) [1909]. Military Aviation. Edited and translated by Lee Kennett. Maxwell Air Force Base, Alabama: Air University Press. ISBN 978-1-58566-118-3.
- Blackman, Raymond, ed. (1953). Jane's Fighting Ships 1953-54. London, UK: Sampson Low & Marston.
- Carrico, John M. (2007). Vietnam Ironclads, A Pictorial History of U.S. Navy River Assault Craft, 1966–1970. Brown Water Enterprises. ISBN 978-0-6151-3984-5.
- Caruana, Joseph (1968). "Yugoslavian monitors". Warship International. 5 (4). Toledo, Ohio: International Naval Research Organization: 333. OCLC 1647131.
- Chesneau, Roger, ed. (1980). Conway's All the World's Fighting Ships 1922–1946. London, England: Conway Maritime Press. ISBN 978-0-85177-146-5.
- Churchill, W. S. (1923). "Chapter XVI: The Channel Ports". The World Crisis 1911–1918. London: Thornton Butterworth. pp. 360–379.
- Colledge, J. J.; Warlow, Ben (2006) [1969]. Ships of the Royal Navy: The Complete Record of All Fighting Ships of the Royal Navy from the 15th Century to the Present (3rd Rev ed.). London: Chatham Publishing. ISBN 978-1-86176-281-8. OCLC 67375475.
- Francillon, René J. (1988). Tonkin Gulf Yacht Club: US Carrier Operations off Vietnam. Annapolis, Maryland: Naval Institute Press. ISBN 978-0-87021-696-1.
- Friedman, Norman (1983). U.S. Aircraft Carriers: An Illustrated Design History. Annapolis, Maryland: Naval Institute Press. ISBN 978-0-87021-739-5.
- Friedman, Norman (1987). U.S. Small Combatants: An Illustrated Design History. Annapolis, Maryland: Naval Institute Press. ISBN 0-87021-713-5.
- Gardiner, Robert, ed. (1983). Conway's All the World's Fighting Ships 1947–1982. Annapolis, Maryland: Naval Institute Press. ISBN 978-0-87021-919-1.
- Gardiner, Robert, ed. (1985). Conway's All the World's Fighting Ships 1906–1921. London, England: Conway Maritime Press. ISBN 978-0-85177-245-5.
- Hone, Thomas C.; Friedman, Norman & Mandeles, Mark D. (2011). "Innovation in Carrier Aviation". Naval War College Newport Papers (37): 1–171.
- Konstam, Angus (2003). The Duel of the Ironclads. Oxford, UK: Osprey Publishing. ISBN 1-84176-721-2.
- Melhorn, Charles M. (1974). Two-Block Fox: The Rise of the Aircraft Carrier, 1911–1929. Annapolis, Maryland: Naval Institute Press.
- Nordeen, Lon O. (1985). Air Warfare in the Missile Age. Washington, D.C.: Smithsonian Institution Press. ISBN 978-1-58834-083-2.
- Podhorsky, Rene (February 1965). "The Ships of the Croat Navy". Warship International. 2 (2). Rutland, Massachusetts: International Naval Research Organization: 44–46. ISSN 0043-0374.
- Polak, Christian (2005). Sabre et Pinceau: Par d'autres Français au Japon (1872–1960) (in French and Japanese). Hiroshi Ueki (植木 浩), Philippe Pons, foreword; 筆と刀・日本の中のもうひとつのフランス (1872–1960). éd. L'Harmattan.
- Sturtivant, Ray (1990). British Naval Aviation, The Fleet Air Arm, 1917–1990. London, UK: Arms & Armour Press. ISBN 0-85368-938-5.
- Till, Geoffrey (1996). "Adopting the Aircraft Carrier: The British, Japanese, and American Case Studies". In Murray, Williamson; Millet, Allan R. (eds.). Military Innovation in the Interwar Period. Cambridge, UK: Cambridge University Press. ISBN 978-0-5215-5241-7.
- Trimble, William F. (1994). Admiral William A. Moffett: Architect of Naval Aviation. Washington, D.C.: Smithsonian Institution Press. ISBN 978-1-5609-8320-0.
- Wadle, Ryan David (2005). United States Navy fleet problems and the development of carrier aviation, 1929–1933 (PDF) (PhD). Texas A&M University. Archived from the original (PDF) on 2015-05-26.
- Wise, James E. Jr. (1974). "Catapult Off – Parachute Back". Proceedings. Annapolis, Maryland: United States Naval Institute.
