= Khasan =

Khasan is an area of the Himalayan region, now part of West Nepal. It may also refer to:

== Places ==
- Lake Khasan, on the border of Russia and North Korea, location of the Battle of Lake Khasan
- Khasan (urban-type settlement), an urban-type settlement in Primorsky Krai, Russia

== People with the name ==
- Khasan Akhriyev (born 1994), Russian footballer
- Khasan Bakayev (1959–2025), Chechen historian
- Khasan Baroyev (born 1982), Russian wrestler
- Khasan Isaev (born 1952), Bulgarian wrestler
- Khasan Yandiyev (1948–2008), Russian judge
- Khasan Dzhunidov (born 1991), Russian association football player
- Khasan Khalmurzaev (born 1993), Russian judoka
- Khasan Khatsukov (born 1995), Russian footballer
- Khasan Mamtov (born 1984), Russian association football player

== Other ==
- Khasan class monitor
  - Soviet monitor Khasan

== See also ==
- Khasan-Chek, a village in Kyrgyzstan
