= History of the Serbian River Flotilla =

Serbian military unit

The history of the Serbian River Flotilla dates back to early 20th century, although its precursors originates as early as 16th century.

== Šajkaši ==
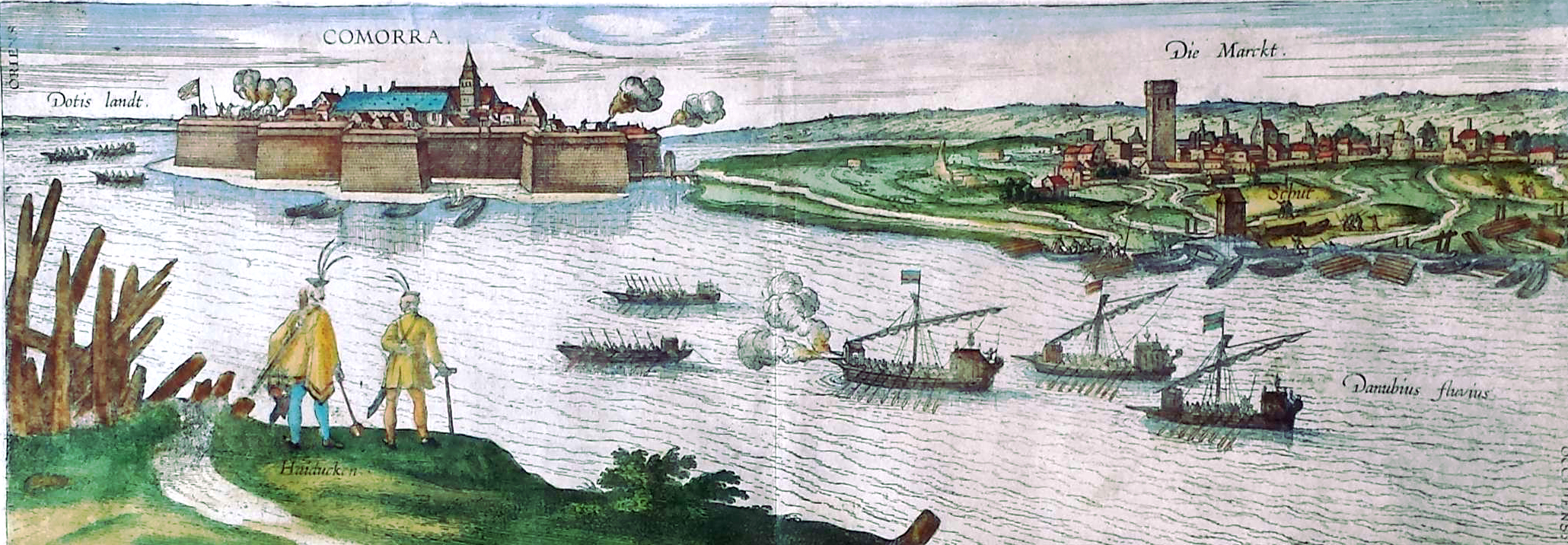
View of Komárno with chaikas, 1597

The modern Serbian River Flotilla originates from the Serbian šajkaši river troops that guarded the Danube and Sava rivers, and especially, the Port of Belgrade, against Ottoman Empire river fleets from the 16th to the 19th century. Led by Hungarian or Austrian sponsors against the Ottomans, the šajkaši were ethnic Serbs who enjoyed special military status in return for their service. Their name šajkaš, was derived from the Serbian word for the small wooden chaika (šajka, tschaiken) galley. Propelled by sail or oars, the Serbian šajka was crewed by 30 and 50 šajkaši, consisting of a commanding officer, a helmsman, an armourer, a drummer, two bowman, and up to 36 oarsmen.

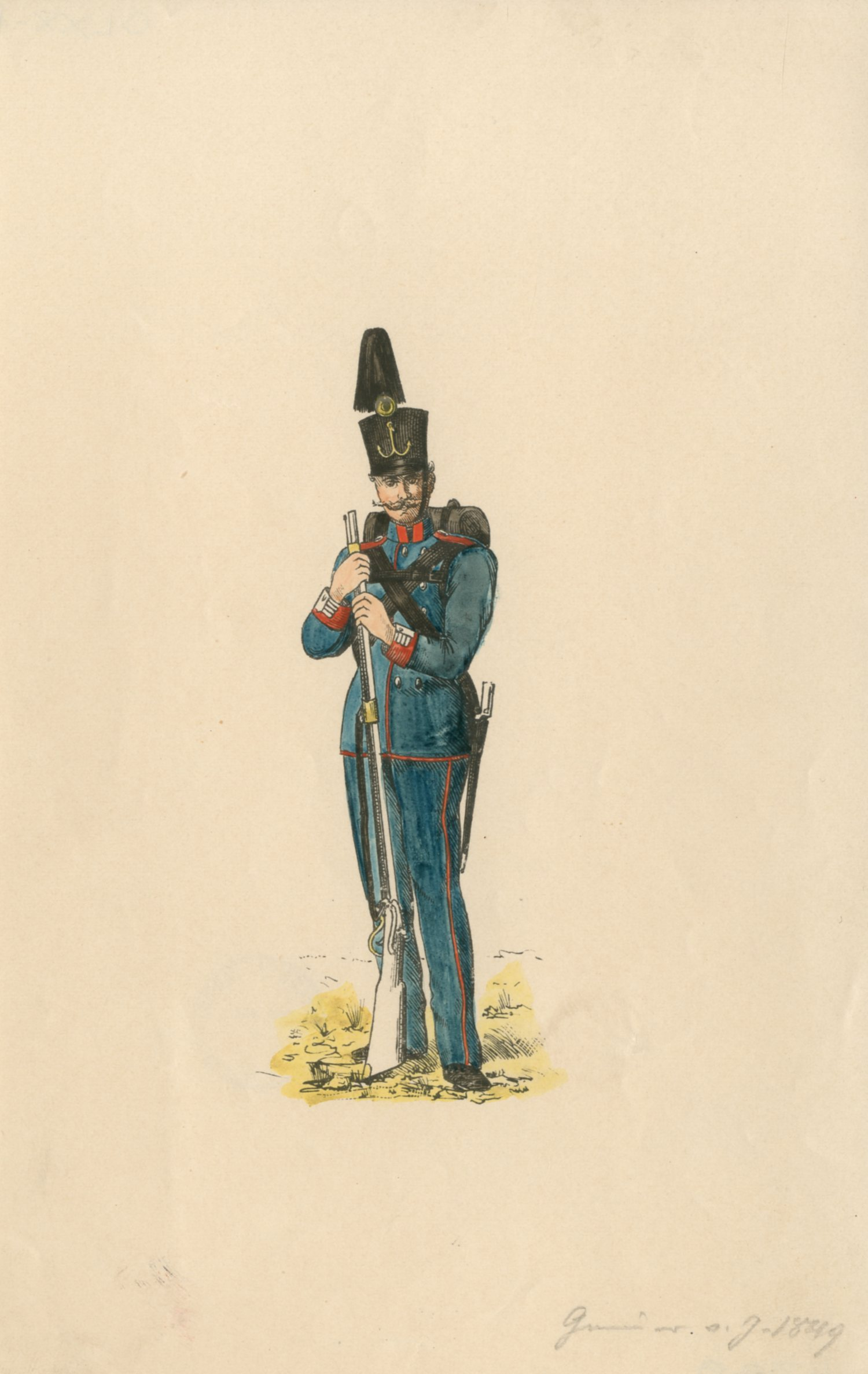
Šajkaš, member of the river flotilla troops of the Habsburg Monarchy

The early Serbian šajkaš fleet achieved its most notable success on 14 July 1456 when an entire Turkish fleet of 200 ships was destroyed under the walls of Belgrade. At the Battle of Petrovaradin in 1526, Serbian šajkaši commanded by Serbian despot Pavle Bakić, successfully defeated another Ottoman flotilla in the service of Ferdinand I Archduke of Austria and King of Hungary and Croatia.

Following the Ottoman conquest of Hungary in 1541, many Serbian šajkaši settled in present-day Slovakia and founded the Austrian Tschaikistenflotte becoming an integral component of the Austrian Danube fleet.

Following the Treaty of Belgrade (1739), the šajkaši bands in Komarno, Esztergom, Györ and other places were disbanded and in 1763 the Frontier Šajkaši Battalion (Serbian: Крајишки шајкашки батаљон, romanized: Krajiški šajkaški bataljon), known in German as czaikisten-bataillon, in Southeast Bačka was founded by the Habsburg War Council. The Serbian šajkaši became an integral component of the Austrian Danube fleet and so much so that following the Austrian conquest of Hungary and present-day Vojvodina, the Šajkaška province in modern-day Serbia was founded. Active between 1763 and 1873, the Serb colonising community which was employed into the battalion (šajkaši) was given the Šajkaška region, which initially included six villages and eventually increased by eight. The battalion headquarters were in Titel. The battalion had four bands in 1769, with 1,116 men, although it was constantly expanding. The modern day traditional Serbian šajkača hat is believed to be derived from the 18th-century Banat based Frontier Šajkaši Battalion uniform.

During the Third Austro-Turkish War (1788–1791) šajkaši were essential to liberation of Belgrade on October 7, 1789. After the Svištov Treaty, the Šajkaški Battalion returned to peace regime on September 1, 1791.

== Principality/Kingdom of Serbia ==
During the Serbian Revolution against Ottoman Turkish rule, the national movement of the Serbian population on the Lower Danube and Sava included the Šajkaški Battalion. After the liberation of some parts of Serbia from Ottoman rule, the construction of the first Serbian naval vessels for a River Flotilla began and in 1834 the first Serbian brig "Srbija" was launched during the rule of Prince Miloš Obrenović.

From 1862, the Principality of Serbia possessed a river fleet of 12 steamboats, 52 cargo ships and 14 pontoon bridges all built at the "Royal Serbian Shipyard" at Čukarica.

As political conflicts between Serbs and Hungarians culminated in a sudden attack on Sremski Karlovci on June 12, 1848, the Šajkaški Battalion played a decisive role in helping Serbia become an independent constitutional monarchy and lay the ground for the creation of modern Serbia. After the declaration of the war against Turkey in 1876, the River Flotilla of the Principality of Serbia deployed naval mines on the Danube River which was the first reported use of naval mines in Europe.

== World War I ==
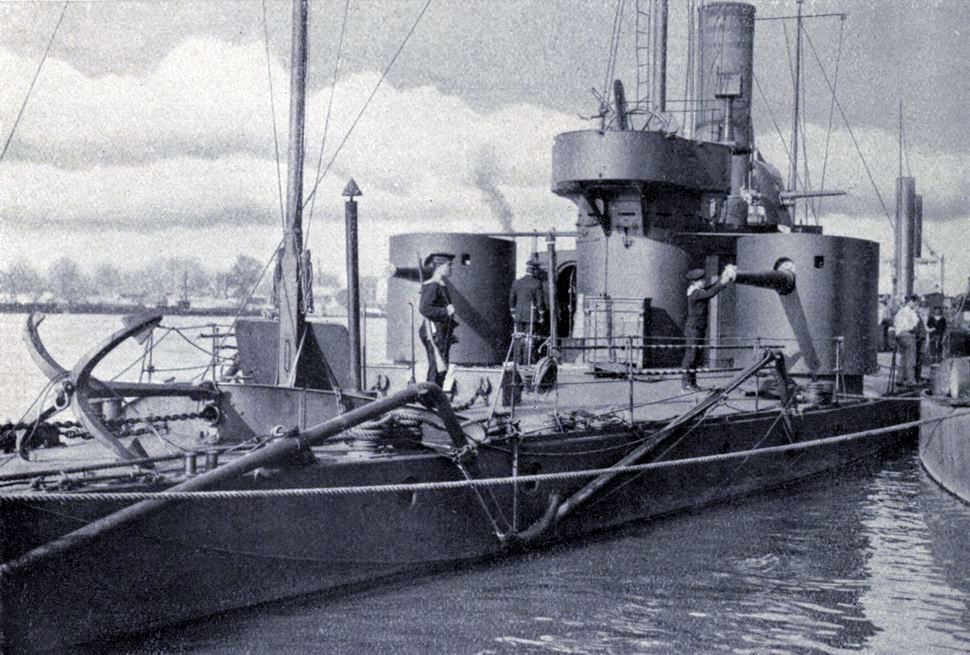
"Sava" as the Austro-Hungarian SMS "Bodrog" in 1914

The Kingdom of Serbia received its first true warship, the patrol boat "Jadar", on August 6, 1915, and commemorates the establishment of the modern Serbian River Flotilla on that day. Built in "Royal Serbian Shipyard", the "Jadar" was armed with two machine guns and was used for mine laying on the Sava and Danube rivers. At the beginning of the First World War, the flotilla fell under the Velika Ada Ciganlija Command, commanded by Lt. Colonel Milan Radojević - the first commander of the Serbian River Flotilla. The flotilla maintained the connection between the right bank of the Sava River and Velika Ada Ciganlija island occupied by Serbian troops, protected lines of communication between Belgrade and Obrenovac, assisted in the transport of Serbian troops in Syrmia, mined waterways and performed reconnaissance.

== Kingdom of Yugoslavia ==
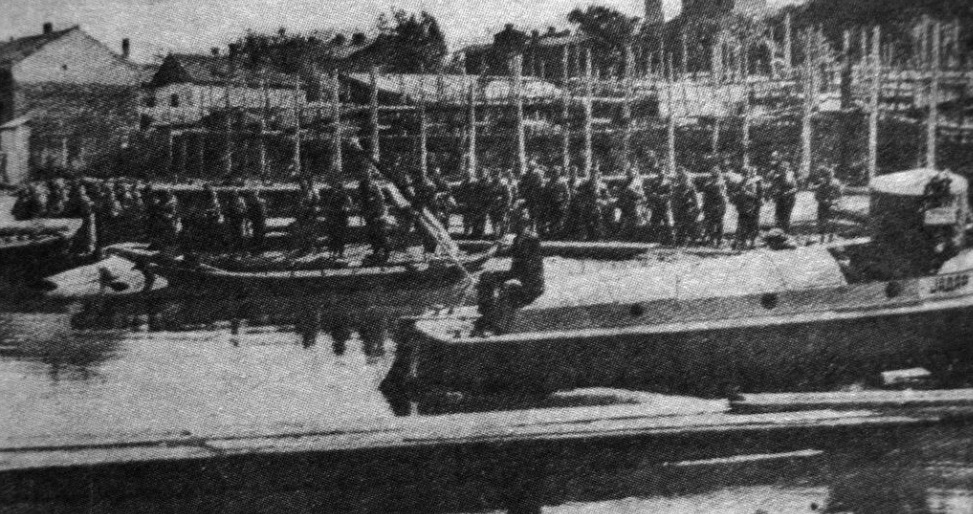
Serbian river patrol boat "Jadar"

As an allied victor in 1918, Serbia began the reconstruction and reconstitution of its armed forces, in a new state of the Kingdom of Yugoslavia. Within the Naval Department, the Danube Flotilla was headquartered in Novi Sad and commanded over the River Flotilla bases and naval detachments on lakes. As the victors over the now dissolved and defeated Austro-Hungarian empire, the Kingdom expected to receive a significant number of vessels from the former Austro-Hungarian navy and its Danube Flotilla, now under control by the Allies. In 1919, the Kingdom requested that six monitors, one river gunboat and a floating workshop to be handed over to the new South Slav navy. In 1920, the Royal Yugoslav Navy took the final transfer of the four monitors, one river gunboat and three tugs. The Yugoslav River Fleet command gave the Royal Yugoslav River Flotilla the task of resisting an enemy invasion into Yugoslavia via its internal waterways. Vessels and crews trained in laying river mines and creating obstacles and the new monitors were assigned mine clearing tasks as well as providing support to Yugoslav land units on land. The River Flotilla had at its disposal 202 Austro-Hungarian M-15 floating mines and 202 Austro-Hungarian P-35 river mines stored at Sremska Kamenica.

In the 1920s, technical re-equipment of the Yugoslav shipyards was carried out and the needs of the Royal Yugoslav river fleet were provided by a new shipyards in Novi Sad and Smederevo, where the Yugoslav monitors were modernized. In 1940, the Headquarters of the Danube River Flotilla was subordinated to Main Naval Command of the Royal Yugoslav Navy. The fleet included the monitors' group, a number of auxiliary vessels, a proper naval base and a detachment of ships on Lake Ohrid in Macedonia.

Yugoslav Navy River Flotilla Organization

- Command ship "Cer" - Novi Sad
- 1st Monitor Group - Dubovac
- 1st Mining-Barrage Group - Bezdan
- 2nd Mining-Barrage Group - Stara Kanjiza and Senta
- 3rd Mining-Barrage Group - Sremski Karlovci
- 4th Mining-Barrage Group - Smederevo
- Đerdap sector command - Tekija and Donji Milanovac

List of vessels
Ship/Vessel	Type	Origin	In service	End of service
"Cer"	command ship			
"Vardar"	Sava-class river monitor	Austro-Hungarian Empire	March 1921	Scuttled by her crew on 11/12 April 1941
"Drava"	Enns-class river monitor	Austro-Hungarian Empire	March 1921	Sunk by Luftwaffe on 12 April 1941
"Sava"	Sava-class river monitor	Austro-Hungarian Empire	March 1921	Scuttled by the crew on 11/12 April 1941
"Morava"	Körös-class river monitor	Austro-Hungarian Empire	March 1921	Scuttled by her crew on 11/12 April 1941
"Mostar"	river patrol boat			
"Lovćen"	river patrol boat			
"Velebit"	river patrol boat			
"Graničar" (1929)	gun boat			
"Stražar" (1929)	gun boat			
"Cer"	river tug			
"Šabac"	river tug			
"Sisak"	river tug			

== World War II ==
=== Invasion of Yugoslavia ===
With the German invasion of Yugoslavia on 6 April 1941, the Royal Yugoslav River Flotilla was prepositioned on the Danube and Tisa rivers tasked to close off internal waterways to enemy infiltration and provide support to Royal Yugoslav Army land units . During the opening days of the invasion, the River Flotilla successfully carried out offensive operations against Axis forces shelling the German airfield at Mohács, Hungary on the 6 April 1941 and again two days later. On 11 April 1941, units of the flotilla withdrew towards Novi Sad under repeated attacks by German dive-bombers. In the early morning of 12 April 1941, a squadron of German Junkers Ju 87 dive-bombers attacked the Yugoslav river monitors near Čelarevo hitting the monitor "Drava". Although several bombs that were unable to penetrate the vessel's 300mm thick deck armour, one bomb hit the monitor's funnel killing the ship's captain Commander Aleksandar Berić and killing 53 of the 67 man crew. During the attack, anti-aircraft gunners claimed 12 enemy aircraft shot down, not including the Axis aircraft destroyed at Mohács. The remaining three Yugoslav monitors were scuttled by their crews on 12 April 1941 as German and Hungarian forces occupied their bases and the Yugoslav river systems. Soon thereafter, the Yugoslav River Flotilla ceased to exist with the occupation of Yugoslavia by Nazi Germany, Hungary, Italy and Bulgaria.

=== Yugoslav Partisan Naval Company ===
On 11 September 1944, by Order of General staff of Communist-led Yugoslav Partisan Army in Vojvodina, a Naval Company was formed a part of the Yugoslav 11th Vojvodina NOV brigade in the village of Neštin, Serbia. The men for the new Naval Company were recruited from the captured German ship "Zagreb", a number of signal-corps troops from the General staff of Vojvodina and soldiers from other Partisan units who had earlier served in the navy. The "Zagreb" was a passenger ship converted for mine disposal by the German military. It came under Partisan control after the Partisan crew captured it and stripped the vessel of its light arms and 20mm anti-aircraft cannon. This action was led by deputy commander of "Zagreb" Dragutin Iskra. The Naval Company's first commander was Kara Dimitrijević from Ledinci, deputy commander was Dragutin Iskra, political commissary Svetozar Milovanović, and deputy of political commissary Rada Prodanović. The company had 70 to 80 soldiers and were tasked to attack enemy river traffic on the Danube. The Yugoslav Communist Naval Company operated from the mountains of Fruška Gora at Testera, near Neštin and Krčedin.

On November 20, 1944, the Naval Company was formally based at Novi Sad, Serbia. After little more than two months, the company reported to have severely damaged five enemy vessels and to have lightly damaged forty-three other boats. During the same period, the Partisan Naval Company transported approximately 220,000 Yugoslav Partisans, 2,000 cannons, 3,000 trucks and also other military material across the Danube. In March 1945, the Naval Company was in the possession of seven patrol boats, nine motor boats and seven assault boats. By mid-April 1945, it was reinforced with five more ships and the command ship "Cer". On 20 March 1945, the Sava Flotilla was formed with ships and boats based in Sremska Mitrovica and on 14 April 1945, the Danube Flotilla was formed from ships and boats based at Novi Sad.

== Socialist Yugoslavia ==
Between 1944 and 1965, the Yugoslav River Flotilla was organized in detachments of armored river boats, river assault ships, river auxiliary ships and minesweepers within the Yugoslav Navy. During the 1960s, for a short period, the flotilla was subordinated to the 1st Army of the Yugoslav People's Army, but during later reorganization again became part of the Yugoslav Navy. Between 1965 and 1984 the River Flotilla underwent significant technical modernization and further doctrinal development of riverine warfare. During the same period the flotilla received a number of new Neštin class minesweepers, a degaussing station and overhauled a number of flotilla craft with new weapons systems.

== Yugoslav Wars ==
The Yugoslav River Flotilla took an active part in War in Croatia in 1991, when it patrolled and carried combat missions on Danube, particularly during the Battle of Vukovar.

=== Battle of Kopački Rit ===
On 8 November 1991, Botica class minesweeper RML-308 was dispatched to Kopački Rit to intercept the Czechoslovak towboat Šariš, suspected of smuggling illegal small arms to Croatian paramilitaries. Upon arriving in the vicinity of the mouth of the Drava River on the Danube, RML-308 was ambushed by Croatian forces firing Armbrust and Zolja shoulder launched anti-tank rockets and small arms. During the engagement, Yugoslav Navy 1st class warrant officers, Kristijan Lampret and Stevan Marković were killed, while RML-308 captain Zoran Marković was wounded by sniper fire. Seriously wounded, Marković managed to pilot the stranded vessel to shore with the help of several sailors. RML-308 engaged the towboat Šariš with gunfire, damaging its wheelhouse and hitting one its fuel tanks: on fire, Šariš was eventually towed by a tug to Bratislava, then Czechoslovakia, for major repairs.

== Serbia and Montenegro ==
With breakup of Yugoslavia, the Yugoslav People's Army was transformed into Armed Forces of Serbia and Montenegro in 1992. During this transition the River Flotilla remained part of the Navy. During the 1990s, one new Neštin class river minesweeper was introduced in 1999, and two 601 class landing craft were transferred from sea service at Montenegro to the River Flotilla after being overhauled at "Brodotehnika Shipyard" in Belgrade.

During the 1990s, one new Neštin class river minesweeper was introduced in 1996, and two 601 class landing craft were transferred from sea service at Montenegro to the River Flotilla after being overhauled at "Brodotehnika Shipyard" in Belgrade.
