= Khasanbi =

Khasanbi is a given name. Notable people with the name include:

- Khasanbi Bidzhiyev (born 1966), Russian footballer
- Khasanbi Taov (born 1977), Russian judoka

== See also ==
- Khasan (disambiguation)
