= OMm35-class minelayer =

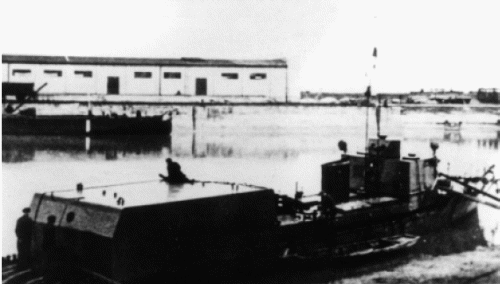
- OMm35 in 1939

Class overview
- Name: OMm35 class
- Builders: Škoda, Komárno
- Operators: Czechoslovak Naval Forces; Kriegsmarine; Royal Romanian Navy; Soviet Navy
- Built: 1938–1939
- In service: 1938–1944?
- Completed: 2

General characteristics
- Class & type: OMm35-class minelayer
- Displacement: 60 tons
- Length: 32 m (105 ft)
- Beam: 4 m (13 ft)
- Draught: 1 m (3.3 ft)
- Propulsion: 2 diesel engines, 670 kW (900 hp), 2 shafts
- Speed: 19 knots (35 km/h; 22 mph)
- Armament: In Romanian service: 1 x 20 mm Oerlikon AA gun; 6 x 8 mm machine guns (2x2, 2x1); 22 mines
- Armour: Twin machine guns: 48 mm; Conning tower: 6 mm

The OMm35 class was a group of two small minelayers of the Czechoslovak Navy. They were captured by Germany in 1939 and transferred to the Romanian Navy in 1941. The two vessels were then captured by Soviet forces in September 1944, their subsequent fates being unknown.

== Construction and characteristics ==
The two vessels were built by Škoda in Komárno between 1938 and 1939. They measured 32 meters in length, with a beam of four meters and a draught of one meter. Named OMm35 and OMm36, the two boats displaced 60 tons each. Initially, they were armed with two machine guns on a single mount and were able to carry up to 22 mines. They were powered by two diesel engines generating an output of 900 hp powering two shafts, which gave the two vessels a top speed of 19 knots. Seized by the Germans in 1939, they were briefly commissioned by the Kriegsmarine as FM1 and FM2, before being transferred to the Romanian Navy in 1941 as V5 and V6. In Romanian service, their armament was increased to one 20 mm anti-aircraft gun and two twin plus two single eight mm machine guns. The two twin machine guns were protected by 48 mm of armour and the conning tower by six mm. The two boats were captured by Soviet forces in September 1944, their subsequent fate remaining unknown.

== Career ==
V5 and V6 laid several mine barrages on the Chilia branch of the Danube Delta against Soviet warships during Operation München, however these proved to be ineffective. During the summer of 1943, joint German-Romanian forces carried out a sweeping operation across the Danube Delta, over 50 mines being swept as a result. Five of these mines were swept by V5.
