= Soviet monitor Khasan =

Soviet warship, launched 1940

History

Soviet Union
- Name: Khasan
- Namesake: Battle of Lake Khasan
- Builder: Krasnoye Sormovo Factory No. 112, Gorky; Khabarovsk Factory No. 368, Khabarovsk
- Yard number: 112; 368
- Way number: 233; 9671
- Laid down: 15 June 1936
- Launched: 30 August 1940
- Commissioned: 1 February 1942
- Decommissioned: 7 September 1955
- In service: 1 February 1942
- Out of service: 7 September 1955
- Renamed: 25 September 1940 from Lazo
- Reclassified: 12 January 1949 to a River monitor
- Stricken: 23 March 1960
- Fate: Scrapped 23 March 1960

General characteristics
- Class & type: Khasan-class monitor
- Displacement: 1,704 long tons (1,731 t) (standard); 2,400 long tons (2,400 t) (full load)
- Length: 88 m (288 ft 9 in)
- Beam: 11.09 m (36 ft 5 in)
- Draught: 2.94 m (9 ft 8 in)
- Installed power: 3,200 shp (2,400 kW)
- Propulsion: 4 shafts, 4 × 800 hp 38KR-8 diesel engines
- Speed: 14 to 15 kn (26 to 28 km/h; 16 to 17 mph)
- Range: 5,510 nmi (10,200 km; 6,340 mi) at 11 knots (20 km/h; 13 mph)
- Complement: 242
- Armament: 3 × 2 130 mm (5.1 in) B-28 guns; 2 × 2 76 mm (3.0 in) 39-K anti-aircraft guns; 3 × 2 45 mm (1.8 in) 41-K anti-aircraft guns; 5 × 2 12.7×108mm DShKs; 29 naval mines
- Armor: Belt: 36 to 77 mm (1.4 to 3.0 in); Deck: 25 to 40 mm (0.98 to 1.57 in); Turrets: 50 to 100 mm (2.0 to 3.9 in); Conning tower: 50 to 100 mm (2.0 to 3.9 in); Bulkheads: 25 mm (0.98 in)

Khasan (Хасан) was a seagoing monitor and lead ship of her class of the Soviet Union. She was named after the Battle of Lake Khasan, a battle that took place near the town of Khasan near the Korean border in 1938 between the Soviet Union and the Empire of Japan. Khasan was active throughout World War II but did not participate in combat. Khasan was notable for being the largest river-going monitor ever built. All three ships survived the war and would continue to serve in the Soviet Navy until 1960. Khasan was laid down 15 June 1936, the same date as both her sister ships, Perekop and Sivash.

== Design ==
Perekop was designed to operate on the Amur River and on the Strait of Tartary between Outer Manchuria, Sakhalin and Japan to protect against the threat the Japanese empire posed against the Russian Far East. Relations between the two countries were poor and a low intensity conflict had been waged by the Soviet Union and Japan since 1932. Planning on her design began in 1935, using an old, unused design from 1915 as its basis. Khasan was armed with three twin 130mm B-28 guns, two twin 76.2mm 39-K anti-aircraft guns at the aft, and three twin 45mm 41-K anti-aircraft guns. In addition she carried an array of heavy machine guns and carried naval mines. Plans for a fourth twin 130 mm turret and a seaplane hangar were scrapped due to overloading issues.

Khasan was protected by steel belt armour ranging from 77 mm amidships to 36 mm at both ends of the ship. The citadel was closed by 25 mm bulkheads. Khasan possessed an armoured deck was 40 mm thickness amidships and 25 mm of protection at the fore and aft. The conning tower and turrets had 50–100 mm protection, and machine gun turrets had 10 mm armour protecting them.

Khasan had a small forecastle allowing for limited high seas capabilities along the Strait of Tartary and the Amur River Basin. The flat bottom hull and bows of the ships were stiffened, giving the monitors icebreaking capabilities.

== Construction ==
Khasan was laid down 15 June 1936 at Krasnoye Sormovo Factory No. 112 shipyard, in Gorky (now called Nizhny Novgorod) along with her two sister ships and named Lazo (Лазо) initially. Work on Khasan continued at Gorky until the mid-1939 when sections of the monitor began to be sent east through the Trans-Siberian Railway to Khabarovsk Factory No. 368, Khabarovsk to be completed. By the time all of her 260 pieces were laid down in Khabarovsk on 4 November 1939 the Second World War had begun in Europe. Khasan was launched 30 August 1940 after having been built, taken apart and rebuilt from one end of the Soviet Union to the other and had been renamed Khasan on 25 September 1940. She was commissioned 1 December 1942, more than six years after being laid down in Gorky.

== Service history ==
Khasan spent the rest of the Second World War as part of the North Pacific Flotilla, of the Pacific Fleet based in Nikolayevsk-on-Amur and did not see action during the Soviet invasion of Manchuria of August 1945. After the defeat of the Japan and the End of World War II in Asia, the most serious threat to the Soviet Union in the Pacific had ended. Khasan's intended role of defending against Japanese aggression had become redundant and her poor oceangoing characteristics and low speed meant she had little practicality on the high seas. Khasan spent the rest of her service life as a training ship on the Amur River until 7 September 1955 when she was decommissioned and placed in reserve. On 23 March 1960 Khasan was disarmed and stricken. She was sent to Khabarovsk for scrapping.

== See also ==
- List of Russian and Soviet monitors
