= Czechoslovak Naval Forces =

- Československé válečné loďstvo
- Active: 1918–1959
- Country: Czechoslovakia
- Type: Brown-water navy
- Role: Naval warfare
- Part of: Czechoslovak Army; Czechoslovak People's Army
- Headquarters: Litoměřice and Bratislava (1919–21)
- Engagements: Polish–Czechoslovak War; Hungarian–Czechoslovak War

Commanders
- Notable commanders: Zdenko Hudeček (1919–21)

Insignia
- Naval ensign (1935–1939 and 1945–1955)

- Naval ensign (1955–1959)

The Czechoslovak Naval Forces (Československé válečné loďstvo) were the naval arm of the former Czechoslovak state. Due to Czechoslovakia being landlocked and with no large rivers flowing through it (the Danube formed a small part of its border), its naval forces were small and consisted only of riverine craft operating on the Danube (and briefly on the upper Elbe).

== Czechoslovak Legion ==
The Czechoslovak Legion in the Russian Far East possessed in 1918 a maritime section of two steamers and an icebreaker, based at Vladivostok, which were used for transport. Later that same year the Legion seized two steamers on Lake Baikal, which were armed with howitzers. Engaging with the Red Army based on the port of Mysovaya, Legion naval forces sank the icebreaker Baikal. By 1920, though, the Legion was finished as a military force in Russia.

== First Republic ==
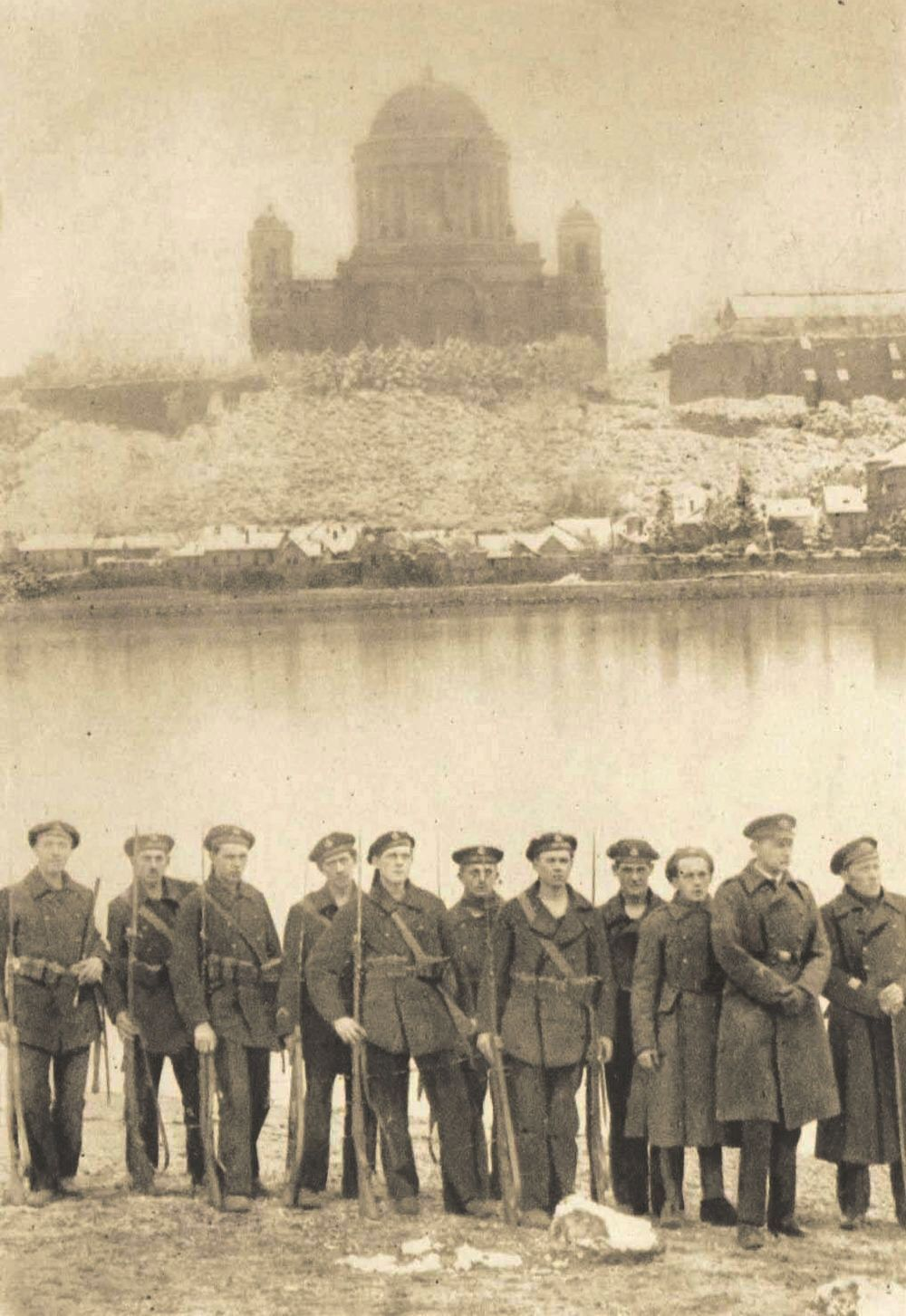
Czechoslovak marines in Štúrovo with the Esztergom Basilica in the behind, 1919

At first, the First Czechoslovak Republic operated river craft inherited from the Austro-Hungarian Empire. From 1919 until 1921 the Czechoslovak naval forces consisted of an Elbe Section (based at Litoměřice) and a Danube Section (based at Bratislava). These sections were separated, the Elbe and Danube not being connected. The larger ships were deployed on the Danube, the Elbe section being more suited to transport, reconnaissance, and engineering support roles rather than combat.

In 1921 these sections were consolidated by eliminating the Elbe section. The remaining (Danube) section was placed under the 4th Engineer Regiment. This Danube flotilla consisted of a headquarters section, bridging engineer section, transport section, mine warfare section, replacement section, and arsenal.

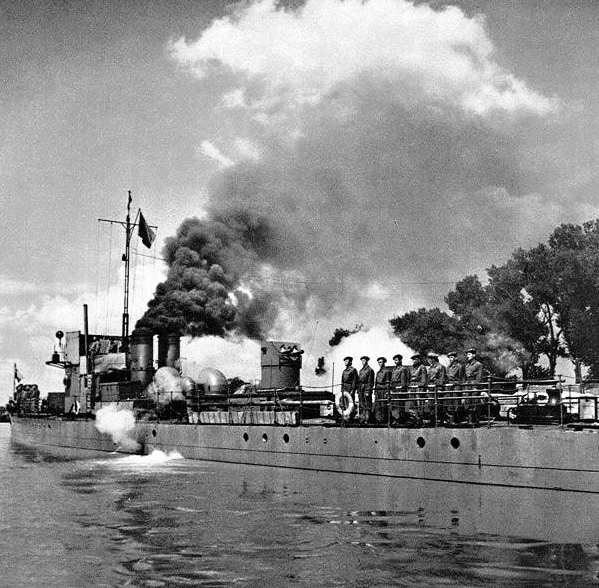
President Masaryk, the largest and most powerful warship ever fielded by Czechoslovakia

The old Austrian craft being considered obsolescent by the late 1920s, plans were made to build two new large river monitors. One of these, President Masaryk, was built, being commissioned in 1932. With four 66-millimetre (2.6 in) guns, President Masaryk was the flagship and most powerful ship of the Danube flotilla. President Masaryk was the only Czechoslovak ship able, to some degree, to match the best ships of the more powerful fleets of the other Danubian powers (Yugoslavia, Romania, and Hungary) in the 1930s.

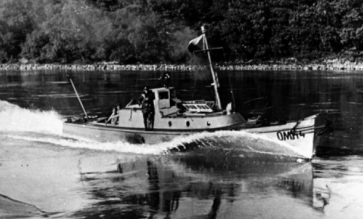
Czechoslovak OMH class motor launch with a bone in her teeth

The flotilla also included various other craft. The gunboats MD-1 and MD-2, originally ordered for Austria-Hungary as torpedo retrievers, were equipped with 2 single mount Škoda 75-millimetre (3.0 in) cannon, two machine guns, and mines. The OMH class launches were also ordered by Austria but not completed until 1924; their only armament was two machine guns. Two small minelayers were the last warships to be commissioned by the flotilla, the first entering service in 1938.

The flotilla expired along with the Republic in 1939, and President Masaryk was pressed into service by the Germans in World War II.

== Postwar (Third Republic and Socialist Republic) ==
In 1946, the 14th Naval Engineer Battalion was created at Bratislava, with some minelayers and other vessels in its equipment. The largest boat in the naval forces was the former Sicherungsboot 43 (English: Security Boat 43), inherited from the Germans. This vessel was armed with a 75-millimetre (3.0 in) gun in a Panzer IV medium tank turret, and four 20mm anti-aircraft guns.

In 1950 the 52nd Maritime Regiment was formed at Bratislava, and the 14th Naval Engineer Battalion was subsumed into this unit. Further reorganization occurred in 1957. By this time it was clear that the main issue facing naval forces on the Czechoslovak Danube was not defense against external aggression, but preventing citizens from fleeing to Austria. Also by the late 1950s it was becoming evident that riverine forces, while suited to patrol duties on large backcountry rivers (such as in Africa or South America), would probably fare poorly in the crucible of a full-scale mechanized war, being particularly vulnerable to air forces.

Accordingly, in 1958 the members of the Warsaw Pact signed a resolution whereby defense of the Danube was given over to the Soviet Navy's Danube Flotilla. In 1959 the Czechoslovak naval forces were disbanded, and the inland waters security forces were transferred to the Ministry of the Interior, forming a naval contingent of the Border Guard Service.

== In literature ==
Ottokar Prohaska, fictional protagonist of John Biggins's Ottokar Prohaska novels, was for a time Commander in Chief of the Czechoslovak Danube Flotilla.
