= Khasan-class monitor =

Class overview
- Name: Khasan
- Builders: Krasnoye Sormovo Factory No. 112, Gorky; Khabarovsk Factory No. 368, Khabarovsk
- Operators: Soviet Navy
- Preceded by: Zheleznyakov class
- Succeeded by: Vidlitsa class (Planned)
- Built: 1936–1942
- In service: 1942–1968
- Completed: 3
- Scrapped: 3

General characteristics
- Type: River monitor
- Displacement: 1,704 long tons (1,731 t) (standard); 2,400 long tons (2,400 t) (full load)
- Length: 88 m (288 ft 9 in)
- Beam: 11.09 m (36 ft 5 in)
- Draft: 2.94 m (9 ft 8 in)
- Installed power: 3,200 shp (2,400 kW)
- Propulsion: 4 shafts, 4 × 800 hp 38KR-8 diesel engines
- Speed: 14 to 15 knots (26 to 28 km/h; 16 to 17 mph)
- Range: 5,510 nmi (10,200 km; 6,340 mi) at 11 knots (20 km/h; 13 mph)
- Complement: 242
- Armament: 3 × 2 130 mm (5.1 in) B-28 guns; 2 × 2 76 mm (3.0 in) 39-K anti-aircraft guns; 3 × 2 45 mm (1.8 in) 41-K anti-aircraft guns; 5 × 2 12.7×108mm DShKs; 29 naval mines; 12 M-1 depth charges
- Armor: Belt: 36 to 77 mm (1.4 to 3.0 in); Deck: 25 to 40 mm (0.98 to 1.57 in); Turrets: 50 to 100 mm (2.0 to 3.9 in); Conning tower: 50 to 100 mm (2.0 to 3.9 in); Bulkheads: 25 mm (0.98 in)

The Khasan-class (Project 1190) were a class of three sea-going river monitors built between 1936 and 1942 for the Soviet Navy, the Khasan, Perekop and Sivash. All three ships served with the Amur Flotilla of the Pacific Fleet throughout the Soviet invasion of Manchuria (but did not participate). The Khasan class were notable for being the largest river-going monitors ever built. All three ships survived the war and served in the Soviet Navy until the early 1960s.

== Development ==
Based on an earlier 1915 design, Soviet naval planners set out to design a large sea-going monitor, that was also capable of operating on the Amur River and the Strait of Tartary in the Pacific Ocean against the threat of Japanese aggression. Since 1932 both the Soviet Union and Japan had been embroiled in a series of skirmishes and pitched battles over Japan's creation of Manchukuo. Work on designing Project 1190 began in 1935. While originally envisioned to carry four twin 130 mm guns and house a seaplane, due to overloading issues, the amount of turrets were reduced from four to three and plans for the seaplane were scrapped. Instead, replacing the aft superfiring 130 mm gun were a pair of twin 76 mm 39-K anti-aircraft guns. The Khasan class's air defence capabilities were supplemented by three twin-mounted 41-K anti-aircraft guns.

The Khasan class had small forecastles allowing for limited high seas capabilities along the Strait of Tartary and the Amur River Basin. The flat bottom hull and bows of the ships were stiffened, giving the monitors icebreaking capabilities.

The Khasan class were well protected for monitors, with steel belt armour ranging from 77 mm amidships to 36 mm at both ends of the ship. The citadel was closed by 25 mm bulkheads. The Khasan class possessed an armoured deck was 40 mm thickness amidships and 25 mm of protection at the fore and aft. The conning tower and turrets had 50–100 mm protection, and machine gun turrets had 10 mm armour protecting them.

== Construction ==
The ships were laid down at the Krasnoye Sormovo Factory No. 112 in Gorky in 1936. The ships were named Lazo (Лазо), Simbirtsev (Симбирцев) and Seryshev (Серышев). In the summer of 1939, with war in Europe looming, sections of the ships were sent to Khabarovsk for completion via the Trans-Siberian Railway at Khabarovsk Factory No. 368. Due to the outbreak of the Second World War, completion of the ships was difficult, combined with the limited capabilities of the Khabarovsk shipyard, the monitors would not launch well into the 1940s. During this time the ships had been renamed, Lazo had become Khasan (Хасан), Simbirtsev had become Perekop (Перекоп) and Seryshev had become Sivash (Сиваш). Khasan was commissioned on 1 January 1942 and Perekop was commissioned 2 October 1943. Seryshev was not completed until 31 October 1946.

== Service history ==
During the Second World War, Khasan and Perekop served with the North Pacific Flotilla but did not participate in the Soviet invasion of Manchuria and Korea. By the end of the war, Japan had been defeated threat posed against the Russian Far East had ended. This also ended the Khasan's value as monitors for defending the Strait of Tartary. The three monitors continued to serve with the Pacific Fleet until 1960 but their poor seaworthiness meant they had limited operational use. The Khasan and Perekop were stricken in 1960 while the Sivash was made into a barracks ship in September 1960 and renamed PKZ-22. Three years later it was turned into a floating dosimetric control station named PKDS-7 and then finally retired in 1968.

== Ships ==
Name	Builder	Laid	Launched	Completed	Fate
Khasan (Хасан)	Krasnoye Sormovo Factory No. 112/Khabarovsk Factory No. 368	15 June 1936	30 August 1940	1 December 1942	Stricken 23 March 1960
Perekop (Перекоп)	Krasnoye Sormovo Factory No. 112/Khabarovsk Factory No. 368	15 June 1936	14 June 1941	2 October 1943	Stricken 23 March 1960
Sivash (Серышев)	Krasnoye Sormovo Factory No. 112/Khabarovsk Factory No. 368	15 June 1936	1 October 1941	31 October 1946	Stricken 28 February 1968

== See also ==
- Monitor (warship)
- List of Russian and Soviet monitors
