= List of Russian and Soviet monitors =

This is a list of monitors of the Imperial Russian Navy and Soviet Navy of Russia and the Soviet Union.

== Imperial Russian Navy ==
- Uragan class (1863)
- Smerch
- Charodeika class (1866)
- Admiral Lazarev class (1866)
- Admiral Spiridov class
- Petr Veliky (1870)
- Novgorod (1874)
- Taifun-class river monitors (1907)

== Soviet Navy ==
- Udarnyy
- Aktivnyy
- Zheleznyakov class
- Vidlitsa class Incomplete
- Khasan class
- Zhitomir class ex-Polish Navy
- Smolensk ex-Polish Navy
- Azov class ex-Romanian Navy
- Berdyansk ex-Romanian Navy
- Izmail ex-Romanian Navy
- Kerch ex-Romanian Navy
- Yaz class
- Piyavka class
- Vosh class
- Shmel class
