= Czechoslovak monitor President Masaryk =

River monitor of the First Czechoslovak Republic and Nazi Germany

President Masaryk
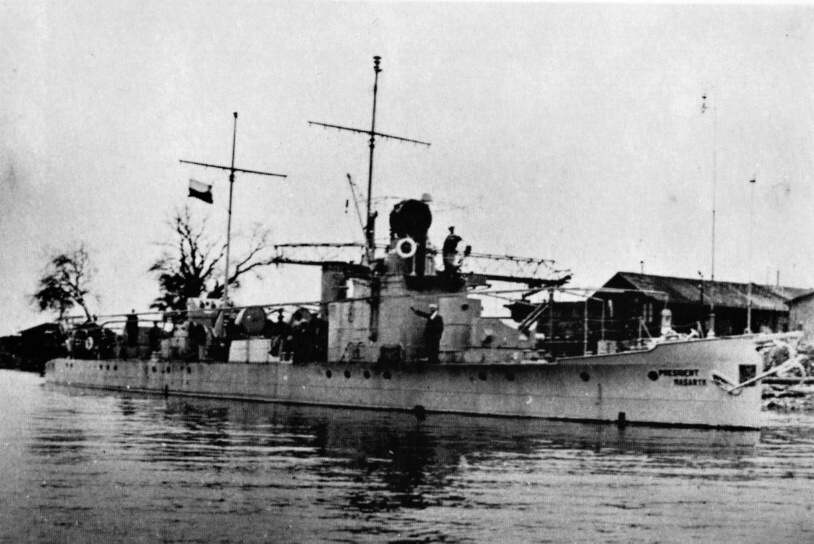
- President Masaryk

History

(Nazi Germany) Czechoslovakia, Germany
- Name: President Masaryk, Bechelaren
- Namesake: Tomáš Garrigue Masaryk
- Builder: Škoda Works
- Laid down: August 1929
- Launched: 1930 or 1931
- Commissioned: August 1932
- Decommissioned: 1945, 1955
- In service: 1932
- Out of service: 1945, 1955
- Fate: Scrapped in 1978

General characteristics
- Class & type: River monitor
- Displacement: 214 t (full fuel load)
- Length: 47.5 m (155 ft 10 in)
- Beam: 6 m (19 ft 8 in)
- Draft: 1.07 m (3 ft 6 in)
- Propulsion: Original: 2 steam turbines; 2,300 hp (1,700 kW); 1943 Modification: 2 diesel engines; 3,600 hp (2,700 kW)
- Speed: 31 km/h (17 kn)
- Endurance: 23 hours at full power
- Complement: 37–46
- Armament: Original: 4 × 66 mm cannon model 30; 4 x heavy machine gun vz. 24; 10 mines; (list not necessarily complete); February 1945 Modification: 2 x 88 mm cannon; 1 x 37 mm Flak gun; 5 x 20 mm Flak gun; (list not necessarily complete)
- Armor: Bulletproof armor only; Belt: 10 mm (0.39 in); Turrets: 8 mm (0.31 in); Deck: 5 mm (0.20 in)

President Masaryk was a river monitor of the First Czechoslovak Republic, serving from 1932 until the dissolution of the republic in 1939. With four 66-millimetre (2.6 in) guns in two twin turrets, it was that nation's most powerful warship of the 1930s and flagship of the Czechoslovak river flotilla. After the German occupation, the ship was taken into the German army under the name Bechelaren and fought against the Soviets. It was scrapped in 1978.

== Service in Czechoslovakia ==
In the 1920s, the Czechoslovak Naval Forces operated river craft inherited from the Austro-Hungarian Empire. These being obsolescent, in the late 1920s plans were made to build two new large river patrol craft. Only one of these, President Masaryk, was built.

The design of President Masaryk was based on the Austrian monitor Catfish (German: Wels). It was designed at the Škoda Works and built at the Škoda shipyard in Komárno. The flat-bottomed hull was divided into 15 watertight compartments.

Various Czechoslovak (and other) companies contributed components to the vessel: Poldi Kladno supplied steel plates, the Škoda works at Plzeň the engines, and the Hamburg company Zeis the marine propellers. Yarrow boilers were installed on the vessel. The ship was laid down in August 1929 and launched in 1930 or 1931. Trials showed that the ship did not perform to specifications, so it was returned to the shipyard for major modifications. Among other changes, the single stack was replaced with dual stacks, one for each engine. These modifications being completed, and the ship's speed increased from 13.8 knots (25.6 km/h) to 16.7 knots (30.9 km/h), President Masaryk was commissioned in 1932. After this it patrolled the Danube River from its base in Bratislava for the rest of the First Czechoslovak Republic's existence. President Masaryk was the only Czechoslovak ship able to match the best ships of the other Danubian powers (Yugoslavia, Romania, and Hungary) in the 1930s.

== Career in German service ==
After the German invasion of 1939, the ship was used by the Germans. Until 1941 it was based in Linz and continued to patrol the Danube. In 1941 it was transferred downriver to the area of Yugoslavia (which had been overrun by the Germans).

In 1943 the vessel was returned to Linz and underwent extensive modernization. The hull was lengthened by 30 centimetres (12 in), the shape of the stern was changed, and new machinery was installed, with the boilers and engines replaced with two MAN submarine diesel engines with an output of 1,800 horsepower (1,300 kW) each. The stacks were removed and replaced with exhaust pipes on the sides of the vessel. The single rudder was replaced with two. Using space freed up by the changes in propulsion machinery, a quadruple mount with four 20 mm flak guns was installed. A separate 20 mm cannon on the stern was replaced with a 37 mm flak gun, and the machine gun turret at the front was removed.

In 1944 Bechelaren was returned to duty on the lower Danube. On the night of April 5–6, 1944, while escorting a convoy, the vessel was damaged by planes of the Red Air Force. After repairs, it was returned to service at Visegrád, Hungary. Later it returned to Linz, where (since 66 mm ammunition was no longer being manufactured) its four 66-millimetre (2.6 in) guns were replaced with two 88-millimetre (3.5 in) naval guns with light shields.

Bechelaren then participated in combat operations in Yugoslavia and Hungary. In 1944 it supported the German counterattack toward Budapest and at Melk in Austria it fought Soviet gunboats. This was Bechelaren's last combat mission.

== Final years ==
On May 11, 1945, Bechelaren's crew surrendered the ship to the United States Army in Linz. In 1947 the ship was returned (without weapons) to Czechoslovakia and taken to Bratislava, where in 1951 it was restored to working condition, but was never re-armed. The Czechoslovak Army having no further use for the vessel, it was sold to the civilian sector in 1955. The hull then served as a hulk for storage and workshops at the Komárno Shipyard. In 1978 President Masaryk was scrapped.
