= Khasan Khatsukov =

Russian footballer

Personal information
- Full name: Khasan Anzorovich Khatsukov
- Date of birth: 27 July 1995 (age 31)
- Height: 1.78 m (5 ft 10 in)
- Position: Midfielder

Youth career
- FC Spartak Moscow
- –2014: FC Khimki

Senior career*
Years	Team	Apps	(Gls)
2014–2016	FC Strogino Moscow	34	(2)
2017	FK Jedinstvo Bijelo Polje		
2017	FC Kamza	0	(0)
2018	KF Bylis Ballsh	0	(0)
- * Club domestic league appearances and goals

Khasan Anzorovich Khatsukov (Russian: Хасан Анзорович Хацуков; born 27 July 1995) is a Russian former football player.

== Club career ==
He made his professional debut in the Russian Professional Football League for FC Strogino Moscow on 8 August 2014 in a game against FC Pskov-747 Pskov.
