= Sava-class river monitor =

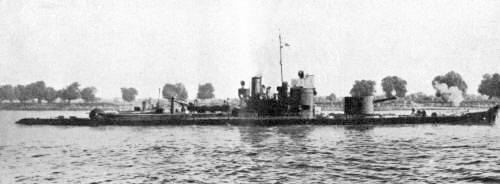
- Yugoslav Vardar in 1933

Class overview
- Name: Sava
- Builders: Stabilimento Tecnico Triestino, Linz
- Operators: Austro-Hungarian Navy; Danube Guard; Royal Romanian Navy; Royal Yugoslav Navy; Soviet Navy
- Preceded by: Enns class
- Succeeded by: Mo. XI class
- Built: 1914–1915
- In service: 1915–1946?
- Completed: 2
- Lost: 1
- Retired: 1

General characteristics
- Type: River monitor
- Displacement: 580 tonnes (570 long tons)
- Length: 62 m (203 ft 5 in)
- Beam: 10.3 m (33 ft 10 in)
- Draught: 1.3 m (4 ft 3 in)
- Installed power: 1,750 ihp (1,300 kW); 2 Yarrow boilers
- Propulsion: 2 vertical triple-expansion steam engines
- Speed: 13.5 knots (25.0 km/h; 15.5 mph)
- Range: 750 nautical miles (Sava, Romanian service, World War II)
- Complement: 91 officers and enlisted men
- Armament: 1 × twin 120 mm (4.7 in) L/45 guns; 1 × twin 120 mm (4.7 in) L/10 howitzers; 1 × twin 66 mm (2.6 in) L/26 guns; 2 × single 47 mm (1.9 in) L/44 guns; 7 × machine guns (6 in Romanian service); 1 x 610 mm depth charge thrower (in Romanian service)
- Armour: Belt and bulkheads: 40 mm (1.6 in); Deck: 25 mm (0.98 in); Conning tower, gun turrets and cupolas: 50 mm (2.0 in)

The Sava-class river monitors were built for the Austro-Hungarian Navy during the mid-1910s. The two ships of the class were assigned to the Danube Flotilla and participated in World War I. The ships survived the war and were transferred to Romania and the newly created Kingdom of Serbs, Croats and Slovenes (later Yugoslavia) as reparations.

== Description and construction ==
The ships had an overall length of 62 m (203 ft 5 in), a beam of 10.3 m (33 ft 10 in), and a normal draught of 1.3 m (4 ft 3 in). They displaced 580 tonnes (570 long tons), and their crew consisted of 91 officers and enlisted men. The Sava-class ships were powered by two triple-expansion steam engines, each driving one shaft, using steam generated by two Yarrow boilers driving. The engines were rated at 1,750 indicated horsepower (1,300 kW) and were designed to reach a top speed of 13.5 knots (25.0 km/h; 15.5 mph). They carried 75 long tons (76 t) of fuel oil.

The main armament of the Sava-class river monitors was a pair of 120 mm (4.7 in) L/45 (Note: L/45 denotes the length of the gun. In this case, the L/45 gun is 45 calibre, meaning that the gun was 45 times as long as the diameter of its bore.) guns in a single turret forward of the conning tower and a pair of 120 mm (4.7 in) L/10 howitzers in the rear turret. They also mounted a pair of 66 mm (2.6 in) L/26 anti-aircraft guns, two 47 mm (1.9 in) L/44 guns, and seven machine guns. The maximum range of her Škoda 120 mm (4.7 in) L/45 guns was 15 kilometres (9.3 mi). Her armour consisted of belt and bulkheads 40 mm (1.6 in) thick, deck armour 25 mm (0.98 in) thick, and her conning tower, gun turrets and cupolas were 50 mm (2.0 in) thick.

== Ships ==
Ship	Builder	Laid down	Launched	Commissioned	Fate
Temes II (Bosna)	Stabilimento Tecnico Triestino, Linz	1914	1915	9 July 1915	Scuttled, 11/12 April 1941
Sava	Stabilimento Tecnico Triestino, Linz	1915	31 May 1915	15 September 1915	Scrapped in 1959

== Careers ==
In Romanian service, Bucovina (ex-Sava) was fitted for service at sea as an anti-submarine escort, having one of her seven machine guns replaced by one 610 mm depth charge thrower. Otherwise her armament remained unchanged. In Romanian service, she also had a range of 750 nautical miles, more than enough to travel across the greatest east–west extent of the Black Sea, which was 635 nautical miles (the Black Sea was the area of operations of the World War II Romanian Navy).
