= Enns-class river monitor =

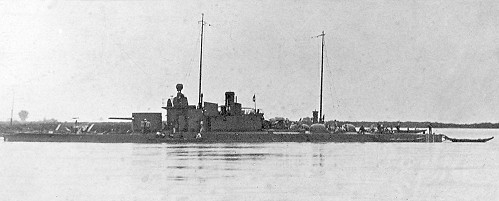
- SMS Enns

Class overview
- Name: Sava
- Builders: Stabilimento Tecnico Triestino, Linz; Ganz Danubius, Budapest
- Operators: Austro-Hungarian Navy; Danube Guard; Royal Romanian Navy; Royal Yugoslav Navy; Soviet Navy
- Preceded by: Temes class
- Succeeded by: Sava class
- Built: 1912–1915
- In service: 1914–1958
- Completed: 2
- Lost: 1
- Retired: 1

General characteristics
- Type: River monitor
- Displacement: 540 tonnes (530 long tons)
- Length: 57.9 m (190 ft 0 in)
- Beam: 10.3 m (33 ft 10 in)
- Draught: 1.3 m (4 ft 3 in)
- Installed power: 2 Yarrow boilers; 1,500–1,700 ihp (1,100–1,300 kW)
- Propulsion: 2 Triple-expansion steam engines
- Speed: 13 knots (24 km/h; 15 mph)
- Range: 690 nautical miles (Besarabia, World War II)
- Complement: 95 officers and enlisted men
- Armament: 1 × twin 120 mm (4.7 in)/L45 guns; 3 × single 120 mm (4.7 in)/L10 howitzers; 2 × single 66 mm (2.6 in)/L50 AA guns; 6 × machine guns
- Armour: Belt and bulkheads: 40 mm (1.6 in); Deck: 25 mm (0.98 in); Conning tower, gun turrets and cupolas: 50 mm (2.0 in)

The Enns-class river monitors were built for the Austro-Hungarian Navy during the mid-1910s. The two ships of the class were assigned to the Danube Flotilla and participated in World War I. The ships survived the war and were transferred to Romania and the newly created Kingdom of Serbs, Croats and Slovenes (later Yugoslavia) as reparations.

== Description and construction ==
The ships had an overall length of 57.9 m (190 ft 0 in), a beam of 10.3 m (33 ft 10 in), and a normal draught of 1.3 m (4 ft 3 in). They displaced 540 tonnes (530 long tons), and their crew consisted of 95 officers and enlisted men. The Enns-class ships were powered by two triple-expansion steam engines, each driving one shaft, using steam generated by two Yarrow boilers. The engines were rated at 1,500–1,700 indicated horsepower (1,100–1,300 kW) and were designed to reach a top speed of 13.5 knots (25.0 km/h; 15.5 mph). They carried 75 long tons (76 t) of fuel oil.

The main armament of the Enns-class river monitors was a pair of 120 mm (4.7 in)/L45 (Note: L/45 denotes the length of the gun. In this case, the L/45 gun is calibre, meaning that the gun was 45 times as long as the diameter of its bore.) guns in a single turret forward of the conning tower and three 120 mm (4.7 in)/L10 howitzers to the rear, in individual armored cupolas. They also mounted two individual 66 mm (2.6 in)/L50 BAG anti-aircraft guns, and six machine guns. The maximum range of their Škoda 120 mm (4.7 in)L/45 guns was 15 kilometres (9.3 mi). Their armour consisted of belt and bulkheads 40 mm (1.6 in) thick, deck armour 25 mm (0.98 in) thick, and their conning tower, gun turrets and cupolas were 50 mm (2.0 in) thick.

== Ships ==
Ship	New name	Builder	Laid down	Launched	Commissioned	Fate
SMS Enns	Drava	Stabilimento Tecnico Triestino, Linz	1912	September 1914	17 October 1914	Scuttled, 11/12 April 1941
SMS Inn	Besarabia	Ganz Danubius, Budapest	1913	25 February 1915	11 April 1915	Scrapped in 1960

== Careers ==
During World War II, Besarabia was the only Romanian river monitor out of seven to be fitted with new turrets. This took place between 1942 and 1943, while she was being completely rebuilt and up-gunned at Galați. Her armament ultimately consisted of two twin 120 mm naval guns, six 37 mm AA guns and four 20 mm AA guns. She also had a range of 690 nautical miles, more than enough to travel across the greatest East-West extent of the Black Sea, which was 635 nautical miles (the Black Sea was the area of operations of the World War II Romanian Navy).
