= 76 mm air defense gun M1938 =

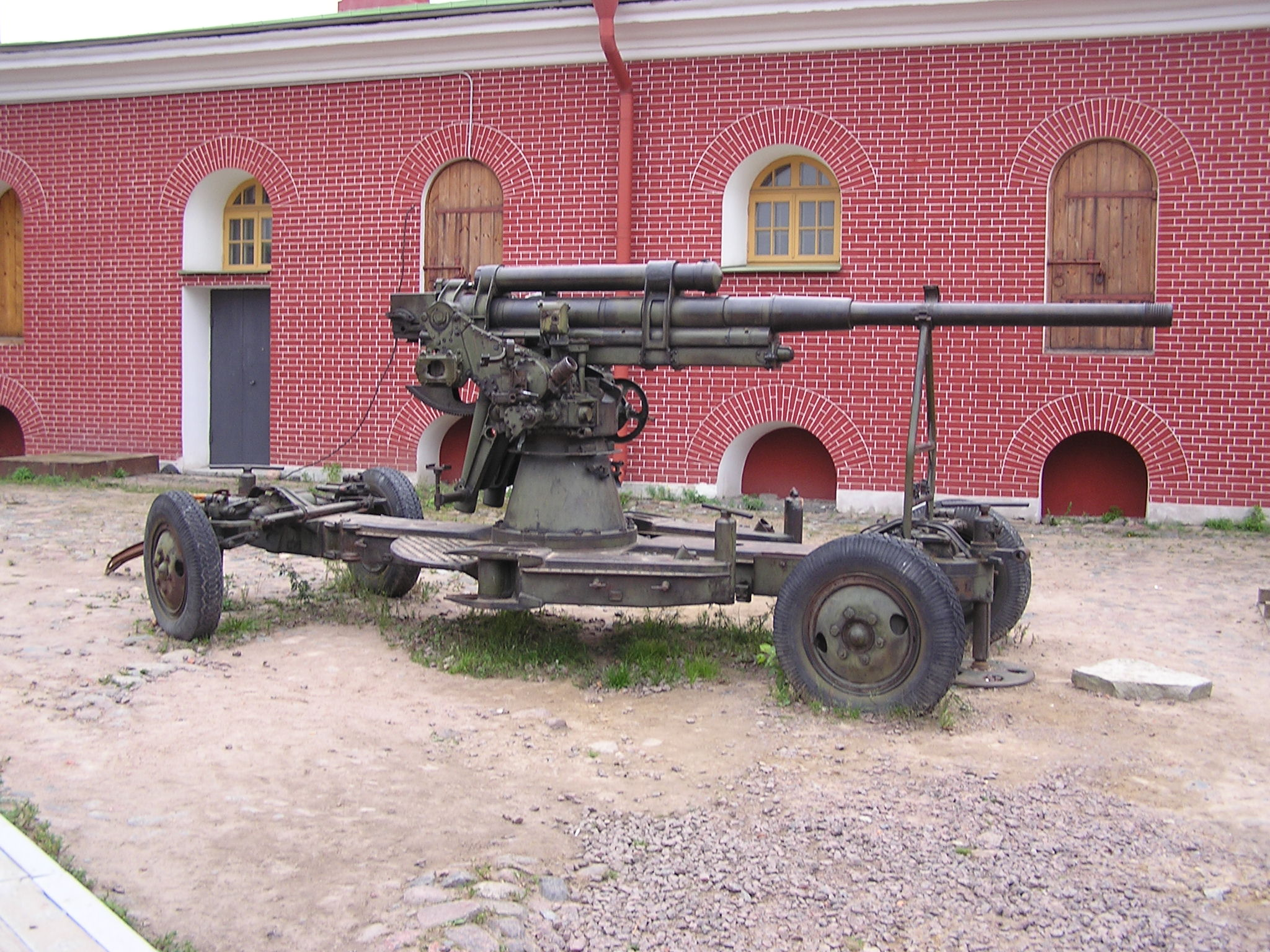
- 76-mm M1938
- Type: Air defense gun
- Place of origin: Soviet Union

Production history
- Produced: 1938–1940

Specifications
- Mass: Travel: 4,210 kg (9,280 lb); Combat: 3,650 kg (8,050 lb)
- Barrel length: 4.1 m (13 ft 5 in) L/55
- Crew: 10
- Shell: Fixed QF 76.2 × 558 mm. R
- Shell weight: 6.6 kg (14 lb 9 oz)
- Caliber: 76.2 mm (3 in)
- Breech: Semi-automatic vertical sliding-wedge
- Recoil: Hydro-pneumatic
- Carriage: Four-wheeled dual-axle trailer with twin outriggers.
- Elevation: -3° to +82°
- Traverse: 360°
- Rate of fire: 10–20 rounds per minute
- Muzzle velocity: 815 m/s (2,670 ft/s)
- Maximum firing range: 9.3 km (31,000 ft) AA ceiling

76 mm air defense gun M1938 (Russian: 76-мм зенитная пушка обр. 1938 г.) was a 76.2 mm (3 inch) Soviet air defense gun, created by Soviet artillery designer M.N.Loginov. This gun was a modernized version of the 76 mm air defense gun M1931, with a slightly modernized barrel and a completely new two-axle carriage ZU-8. This carriage was also used for the more powerful 85 mm 52-K air defense gun, developed in 1939.

The 85 mm gun was chosen for mass production by the Soviet authorities and tooling was switched from the 76.2 mm AD guns, to the 85 mm gun. As a result of this decision, the total number of M1938 AD guns, delivered to the Red Army, was relatively small. These guns were used in the first stages of the German-Soviet War and were gradually replaced by the more powerful 52-Ks.

Guns captured by the Germans were given the designation 7.62 cm Flak M.38(r) and were used unmodified until their ammunition supply ran out. When their ammunition supply ran out they were rebored to fire German 8.8 cm ammunition and their designation was changed to 7.62/8.8 cm Flak M.38(r) and remained in use until the end of the war.

The external appearance of the 76 mm and 85 mm AD guns is very close; the two types can be differentiated by their muzzle brake, the larger gun possessing the larger muzzle brake.
