= Battle of Zvolen (1919) =

- Part of Hungarian–Czechoslovak War
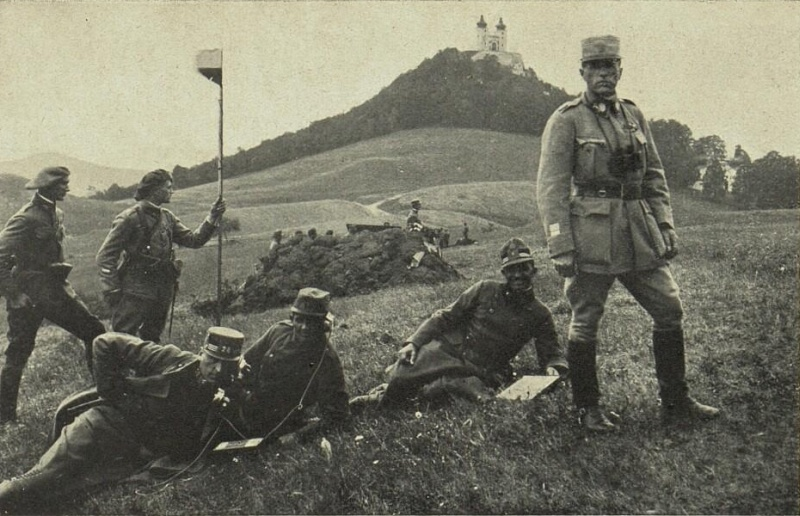
- The position of the Czechoslovak troops under the leadership of Josef Šnejdárek in front of Calvary in Banská Štiavnica in June 1919
Date	10–13 June 1919
Location	Zvolen, Slovakia
Result	Czechoslovak victory: Czechoslovakia took initiative in the war

Belligerents
Czechoslovakia	Hungarian Soviet Republic

Commanders and leaders
Josef Šnejdárek	Unknown

Units involved
Czechoslovak 2nd Infantry Division	Unknown

Casualties and losses
8 killed	Heavy casualties

The Battle of Zvolen was a battle of the Hungarian–Czechoslovak War that took place in June 1919. The reorganised Czechoslovak Army successfully managed to capture Bánská Štiavnica and Zvolen during the battle. This battle was the beginning of the Czechoslovak counteroffensive.

== Situation in 1918–1919 ==
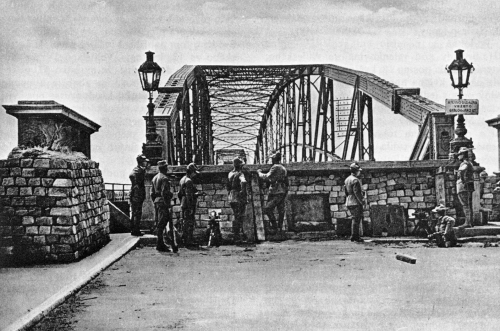
Czechoslovak Legion from Italy captured the Elizabeth Bridge in Komárno

At the beginning of November 1918, the declaration of independence spread across most of the Czech lands. The border districts were occupied by the newly formed army by the end of the year, and the country's historical borders were essentially secured. But the big question remained in Slovakia, which was not geopolitically defined. It was clear that the southern border of the former Upper Land would be where the bayonets of the Czechoslovak army would draw it. The demarcation line between Czechoslovakia and Hungary was determined by the Entente War Council on 25 November 1918 . However, in mid-February 1919, it was moved considerably southward due to Czechoslovak pressure. This brought to Czechoslovakia territories inhabited by Slovaks, who were victims of strong Magyarization. On 21 March 1919, the so-called Hungarian Soviet Republic was established in Hungary, whose representatives declared the dictatorship of the proletariat and a revolutionary war. The Hungarian military command attempted to conquer Upper Land and link up with the Soviet Bolsheviks across the Carpathians. On 28 April, a directive was issued on the advance of Czechoslovak troops to occupy the territory that had been determined based on the decision of the War Council of the Agreement. However, the advance of weak military units to the demarcation line turned into a disaster and the Hungarian revolutionary units began their advance in two directions in May – towards Prešov towards the Red Army and via Lučenec and Zvolen to Žilina. On 16 June, the so-called Slovak Soviet Republic was established in Hungarian-occupied Prešov, which established a dictatorship of the proletariat in the occupied territory. Meanwhile, a change occurred in the Czechoslovak army. The unreliable Italian commanders were replaced by French generals and officers. The newly organized Czechoslovak 2nd Infantry Division was led by the colonel of the French Legions and veteran of the French Foreign Legion, Josef Šnejdárek. Battalions and regiments destroyed in previous battles were reorganised and, together with new units, retreated in the mountainous terrain from one defensive line to another. It took Šnejdárek less than a week to consolidate his subordinate troops and prepare them for offensive operations.

== Battle ==
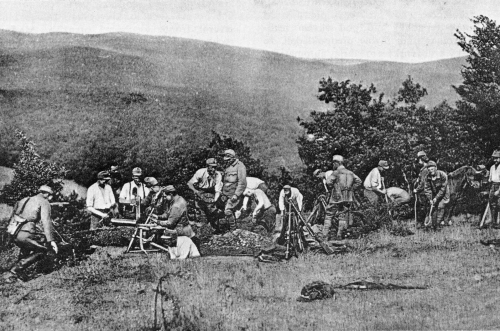
Soldiers resting and cleaning weapons during the fighting against the Hungarian Red Army – May 1919

On the morning of 10 June, the 2nd Infantry Brigade launched a demonstration attack on Zvolen. Its left wing surprisingly appeared in the flank of the Hungarian troops, while the right wing entered Banská Štiavnica. All Hungarian attacks the following day were repulsed and the 2nd Division continued its attack. Šnejdárek changed the direction of the attack and on 13 June ordered a flanking attack on Zvolen. After four hours of fighting, his units occupied the dominant heights and began an attack on key positions of the Hungarian defense. Around noon, the first units reached Zvolen and the front was broken through to a depth of 10 kilometers. The entire middle course of the Hron fell into Czechoslovak hands, and the Hungarian command no longer had reserves with which they could seal the breakthrough.

== Next events ==
The capture of Zvolen marked a turning point in the war. The Czechoslovak army took the initiative and attacked the Hungarians in two directions – towards Levice and towards Lučenec. Week-long fighting ensued, in which all Hungarian reserves were exhausted. The Hungarian army command agreed to the ceasefire and withdrew behind the demarcation line.

== Misinformation about Senegalese ==
Šnejdárek intended to attack the Hungarians in the direction of Levice from the north. Since Šnejdárek had almost no reserves, he decided on a deceit. He called one of the officers and ordered him to set off towards Košice, taking with him about a hundred soldiers in canvas uniforms. These soldiers had to blacken their faces and hands and tie not-quite-white scarves on their heads like turbans. At each railway station, they had to get off, walk along the railway platform, and speak loudly in "Senegalese." The officer objected that he did not have a single soldier who spoke Senegalese. Šnejdárek assured him that it was enough for them to mumble something incomprehensibly, but the word Senegal had to be understandable. He expected that many a Hungarian spy would catch on to this phrase and exaggerate the figures a bit to receive a higher reward.

The "Senegalese" only appeared in Žilina and Košice, yet within 48 hours they thought in Pest that Franchet d'Espèrey, the commander-in-chief of the Allied army in the Balkans, had sent two Senegalese regiments (about 6,000 soldiers) to Šnejdárek via Romania as a backup. From Pest, disinformation then reached the front, where a number of Hungarian soldiers did not want to be captured and threw themselves into the river because of fear of cannibals. "The Senegalese" were young soldiers from Vršovice in Prague.

== Literature ==
- Petr Čornej, Pavel Bělina, Slavné bitvy naší historie, Marsyas 1993
