= Battle of Terron =

1918 battle in WWI France

- Part of World War I, Hundred Days Offensive
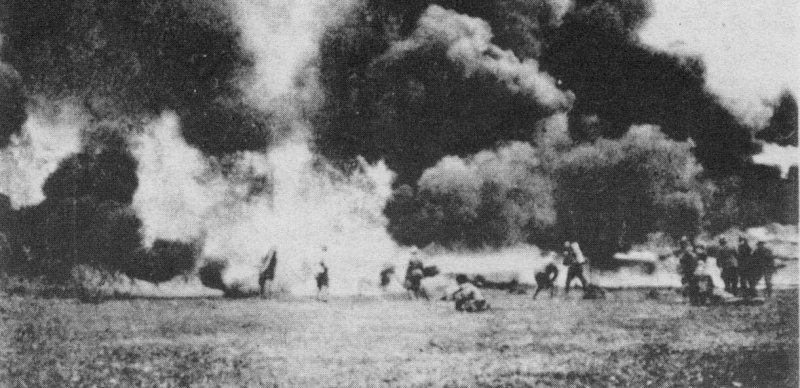
- Czechoslovak Legion in France – fire throwers
Date	18–22 October 1918
Location	Vouziers
Result	Czechoslovak victory

Belligerents
(Kingdom of Bohemia) Czechoslovak Legion	German Empire

Commanders and leaders
(France) Armand Charles Phillipe (Kingdom of Bohemia) Otakar Husák	(German Empire) Karl von Einem

Units involved
(Kingdom of Bohemia) 21st Czechoslovak rifle regiment (Kingdom of Bohemia) 22nd Czechoslovak rifle regiment	(German Empire) 3rd Army (German Empire) 242nd Infantry Division (Bavaria) 1st Bavarian Division

Strength
6,000	Unknown

Casualties and losses
Total: 275; 196 killed 63 died of wounds 16 missing	Not fully known 27 captured one 77 mm gun, 4 mortars, 6 heavy and 9 light machine guns were captured

The Battle of Terron (18–22 October 1918), sometimes referred to as the Battle of Vouziers, was a World War I battle during which the Czechoslovak Rifle Brigade of the Czechoslovak Legion in France was deployed around the French town of Terron. This brigade successfully fought against the German troops and successfully defended the captured positions.

== Situation ==
In the summer of 1918, the newly created Czechoslovak Infantry Brigade in France took up position among the new Allied positions that were supplemented by new Allied troops on the Western Front of World War I in 1918. It was formed by the 21st Czechoslovak rifle regiment under the leadership of Ch. Gillain and the 22nd Czechoslovak rifle regiment under the command of A. Gardan. After completing its training, it joined the French 53rd Infantry Division, which was part of the French 4th Army. The task of this troop was to cross the Aisne River east of Reims and break into enemy German fortifications to tie up all German reserves. This should have enabled the attack of the American 1st Army in the area of Buzancy le Chesne, which would disrupt the entire German defense in the area of the Meuse River.

== Timeline of the battle ==
The Czechoslovak infantry brigade, which numbered 6,000 men, outnumbered the German forces in the attack zone. On 18 October, in the morning hours, the attack began. The 21st Infantry Regiment managed to occupy the village of Terron-sur-Aisne on 20 October and break through to the zone of German defense on the hills above the river. A further advance could mean disaster for the German army, so the Germans had to drive the allied forces back across the river at all costs. That's why they brought in reinforcements and went on the attack on 21 October 21. The Germans launched three counterattacks (also with the help of mustard gas grenades), during which the 1st Battalion of the 21st Infantry Regiment defended itself well, but was forced out during the third attack.However 2nd the battalion of the 21st Infantry Regiment intervened in the fighting. and the German troops fled before they could reoccupy the conquered territory.

The other Czechoslovak regiments also performed excellently. The 22nd Infantry Regiment fought fiercely near the village of Chestres (today a part of Vouziers) and it succeeded in occupying German positions and forcing the Germans to call in reserves. The units deployed here fulfilled their task when they tied up the reserves that the Germans lacked during the attack of the American troops. The performance of the Czechoslovak soldiers was highly rated and was also highlighted by the commander of the 4th French Army, General Goutaud. The fighting in the Vouziers–Chestres–Terron triangle equaled the Battle of Zborov in terms of ferocity, commitment and casualties, even if it remained in its shadow. The later Czechoslovak general engineer Otakar Husák also took part in the battle, who was seriously wounded before in the Battle of Zborov on 2 July 1917.

== Memory ==
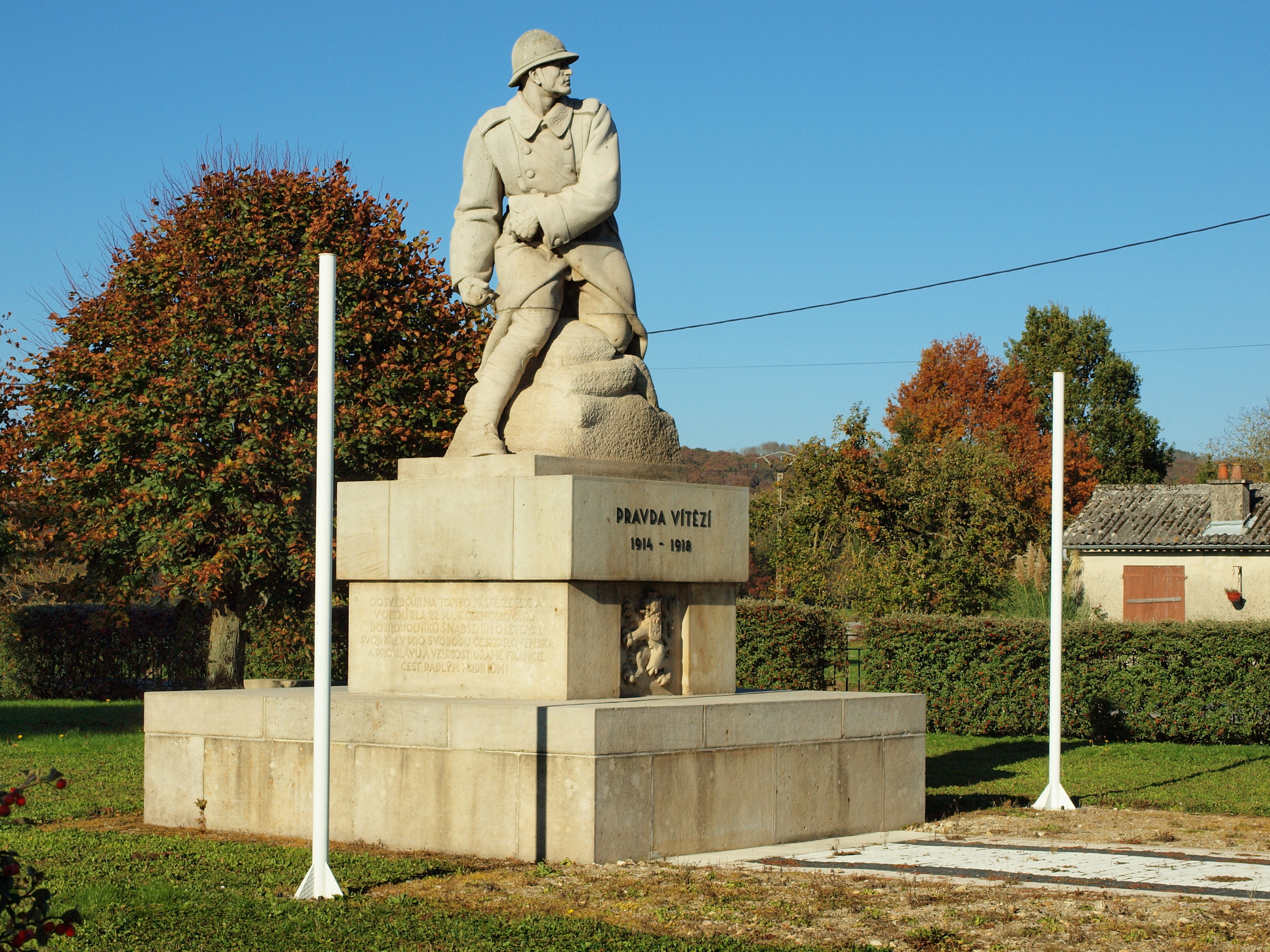
Czechoslovak Memorial in Terron

The Terronská street in Prague-Bubeneč is named in memory of the battle. There is also a memorial plaque in the street.

Right in the village of Vouziers, in the part (originally a separate village) of Chestres, which is adjacent to the battlefield, there is a monument to the Czechoslovak legionnaires.

In 1938, the battle was commemorated with the issue of a Czechoslovak postage stamp (authors: Jindřich Vlček, Bohumil Heinz).

== See also ==
- Hundred Days Offensive
- Poix-Terron
