= Czechoslovak Legion (disambiguation) =

The Czechoslovak legions may refer to:

- Czechoslovak Legion, a unit in Russia during the Russian Civil War
  - Czechoslovak Legion in France, part of French Foreign Legion during World War I
  - Czechoslovak Legion in Italy, formations of the Czechoslovak legions on the Italian front
- Czechoslovak Legion (1939), volunteer Czechoslovak units formed in Poland after German occupation of Czechoslovakia in 1939.
- 1st Czechoslovak Army Corps in the USSR
