= Czechoslovak Legion in Italy =

Legion of Czechoslovak volunteers

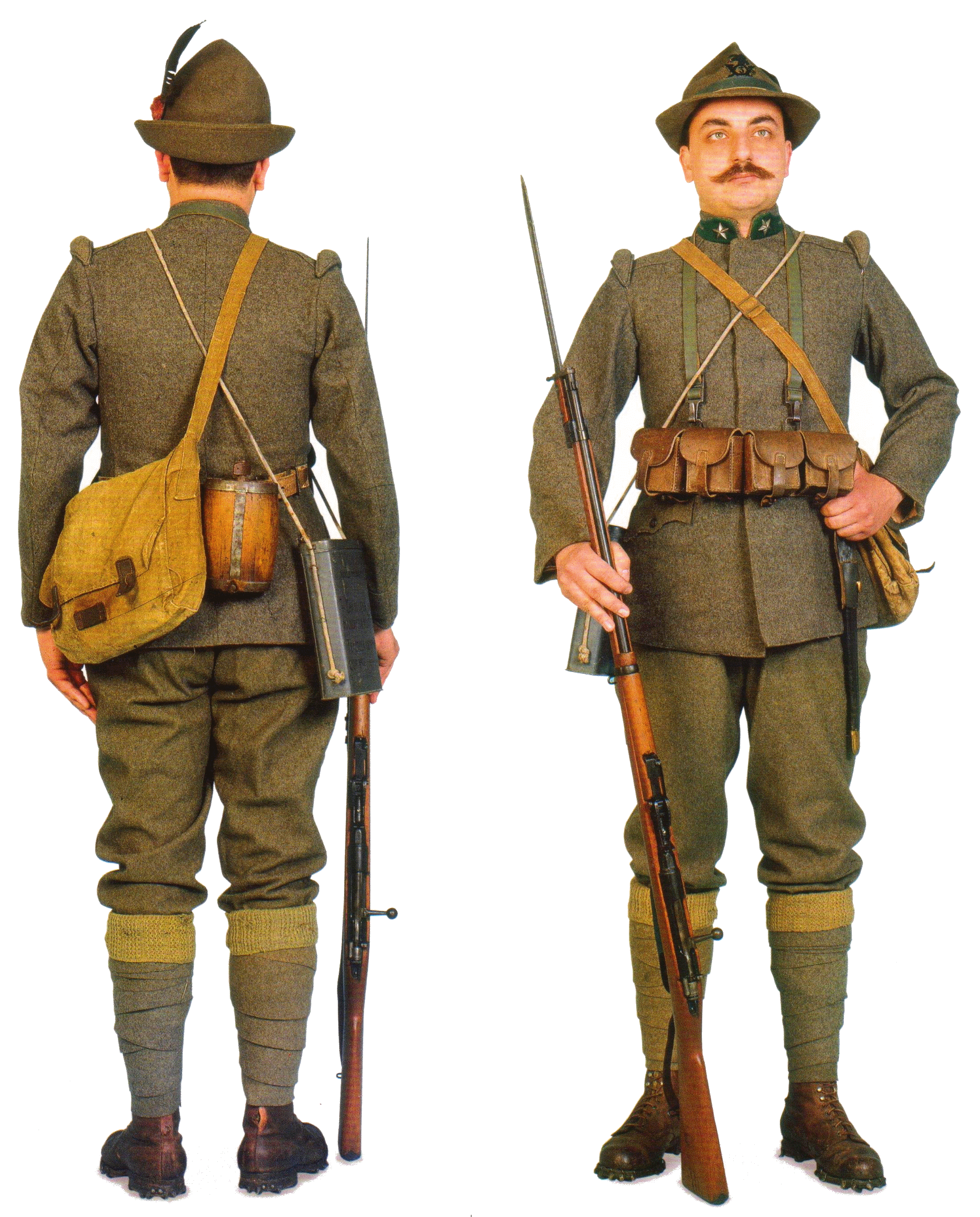
Alpini uniform worn by the Czechoslovak Italian Legion

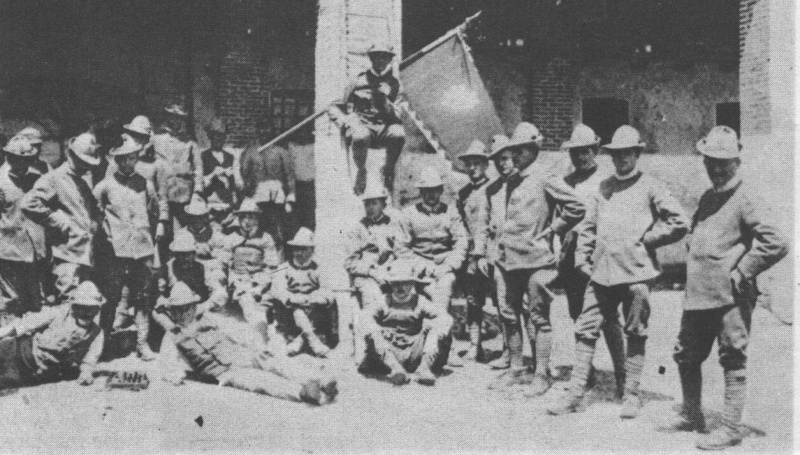
Czechoslovak Legions in Italy

The Czechoslovak Italian Legion was a legion of Czechoslovak volunteers formed late in World War I. The first formal Czechoslovak Volunteers Group (Czech: Československý dobrovolnický sbor) was formed in Italian prisoner-of-war camps in Santa Maria Capua Vetere, near Naples and matured at Padula near Salerno. In January 1918, the headquarters of the 6th Italian Army finally agreed to form reconnaissance squadrons from Czechoslovak and Southern Slav volunteers. In September 1918, the 39th Regiment of the Czechoslovak Italian Legion was formed from those volunteer reconnaissance squadrons. The following regiments of Czechoslovak Italian Legion were formed in April and May 1918:

- 31st Regiment in Perugia (Col. Ciaffi)
- 32nd Regiment in Assisi
- 33rd Regiment in Foligno (Maj. Sagone)
- 34th Regiment in Spoleto (Col. Gambi)
- 35th Regiment was formed in October 1918 from new Czechoslovak prisoners of war in Italy

The Czechoslovak Italian Legion formed two divisions: VI. Division, which included 31st, 32nd, and 35th Regiments; and VII. Division, which included 33rd, 34th, and 39th Regiments. Their total strength was around 25,000 men. The Czechoslovak Italian Legion was commanded by General Andrea Graziani and later by General Luigi Piccione. After the war, the Legion was repatriated to Czechoslovakia in 1919 and most went to Slovakia to fight in the Hungarian–Czechoslovak War.

== Background ==
The Czechoslovak Legion in Italy was formed as a result of the efforts by Slovak leader Milan Rastislav Štefánik and Czech leaders Tomáš Masaryk and Edvard Beneš, who at the outbreak of World War I supported the idea wherein the Austro-Hungarian Empire should be broken up so that Czecho-Slovakia would become an independent country. These ideas led to the formation of the Czech Committee Abroad (in 1915). The Czech Committee Abroad then became the Czecho-Slovak National Council.

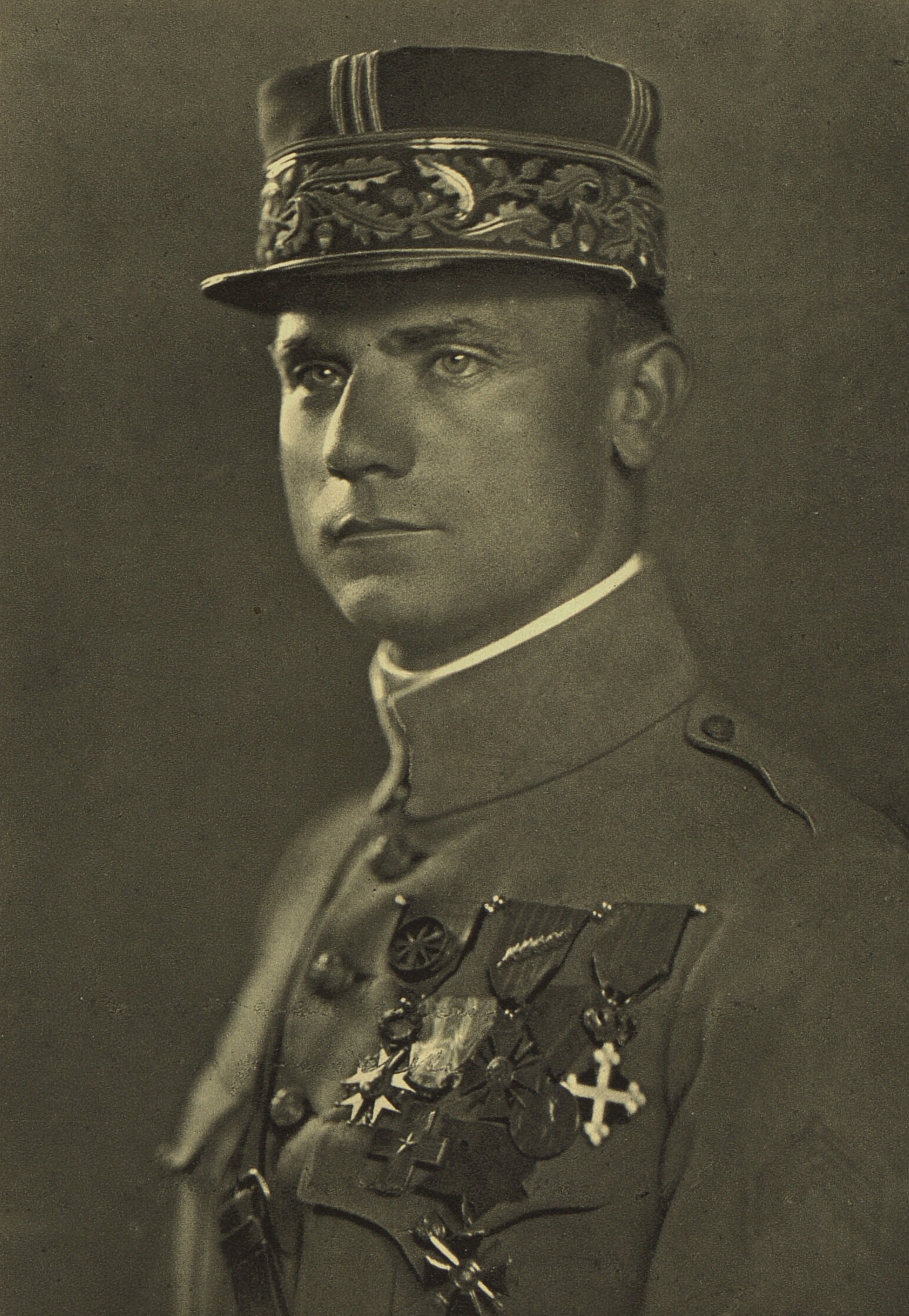
General Štefánik

Štefánik, who had become a French citizen in 1912 was one of thousands of expatriate Czechs and Slovaks who volunteered for France when the war began, as early as August 1914.

A similar volunteer effort began in Russia. Under the leadership of Masaryk, expatriate Czechs asked the Russians to accept Czech and Slovak applicants into Russian Army in August 1914. They formed a distinct druzhina. At this time about 70,000 Czechs and Slovaks were living or working in Russia. The druzhina were deployed as reconnaissance units and also began a propaganda campaign to convince their fellow countrymen who had been conscripted into the Austro-Hungarian army to defect. Under Štefánik's guidance, large numbers of Czechs and Slovaks defected on the Russian front and formed the Czechoslovak Legion. These forces were later supplemented by recruitment of Czech and Slovak prisoners of war.

The members of the Czecho-Slovak Legion were also heavily influenced by the Sokol movement.

== Czechoslovak Corps of Volunteers in Italy Before 1918 ==
The Czechoslovak Legion in Italy arose under different circumstances than in France or Russia. First, there were only a small number of expatriate Czechs and Slovaks living in Italy. Second, the Italians were a late-comer to the World War, declaring war in May 1915 against Austro-Hungary (but not Germany until 28 August 1916). The Italians' main reason for entry was to annex Italian-speaking lands in Austria including territories in Istria and Dalmatia (Italian irredentism). These lands were also the home of Slavic peoples and thus there was some concern about supporting the Czechs and Slovaks (also Slavs) who supported the break-up of the Austro-Hungarian Empire. (At the conclusion of the war the State of Slovenes, Croats and Serbs (which later merged into Yugoslavia) was in fact created and led to conflict with the Italians.) There were, however, eventually, by 1916–17, a great number of enemy combatants as prisoners of war in Italy, who were Czechs and Slovaks. These individuals were to become the Legion.

Beginning in April 1916, on a political-diplomatic visit to Italy, Milan Štefánik's continued to advance the Czechoslovak cause (for independence), to establish a basis for its support and to activate mechanisms for the formation of a military force in support of the Allied troops. Because of the aforementioned geopolitical concerns, the Italians resisted the establishment of a Czechoslovak Legion. However, there were recurring incidents of Czech desertions that were being utilized by Italian army intelligence to aid the war effort. In 1916, Václav Pán aided the Italian 2nd Army. Later that year Jaromír Vondráček (a company commander) was crucial to Italian war successes by the 3rd Army. . That summer, an event took place that would really begin to change some minds in Italy about a Czechoslovak Legion.

On 11 August 1916 a Czech officer, František Hlaváček, deserted his post in the Isonzo during the Battle of Gorizia, and demonstrated to the Italian field commanders and intelligence officers, the usefulness and viability of a Czech Legion. Hlaváček had, crucially, information about an offensive in the planning stages. His information concerned the Bainsizza Plateau. Initially, nothing was done about the information and Hlaváček was sent to an officers' prison camp near Bibbiena. Then several months later in April 1917, he was recalled to General Pietro Badoglio's 2nd Army Headquarters in Cormons to detail the plan. Although nothing much came about because of the plan at that time, the local operation which did take place, engendered a reaction by the Austro-Hungarian troops there wherein an entire battalion of Czech troops deserted to the Italians. Soon enough Italian officers were believers that a full scale offensive at Bainsizza was planned and, during this period, Hlaváček became the first prisoner of war actually freed from captivity. The attack on Bainsizza was a main objective of the Eleventh Battle of the Isonzo, an Italian victory. Hlaváček was awarded the military cross and later lobbied on behalf of establishing a Czechoslovak Legion in Italy.

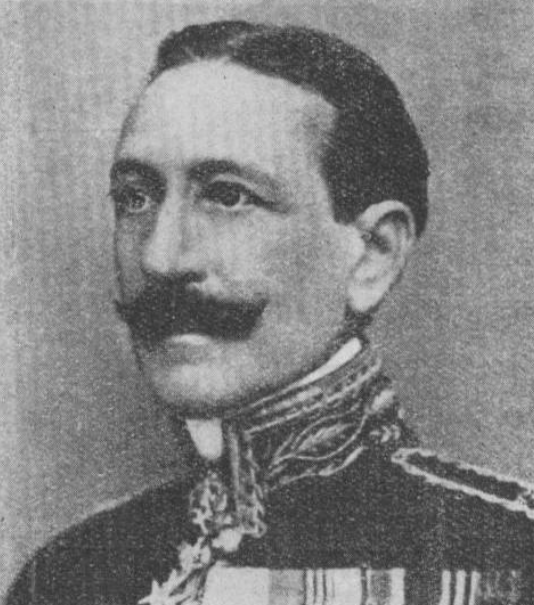
Prince Pietro Lanza

The reaction of the Italian politicians was now turning positive and on 11 January 1917 deputy Pietro Lanza, prince of Scalea, with the patronage of the Dante Alighieri association, formed the "Italian Committee for Czech-Slovak independence".

Thus Czechoslovak scouts (or intelligence operatives) entered the fight as a part of the Italian forces as the Esploratori Cecoslovacchi. As in Russia, these units were also tasked with a propaganda campaign to convince their fellow countrymen, who had been conscripted into the Austro-Hungarian army for a cause they did not support, to defect.

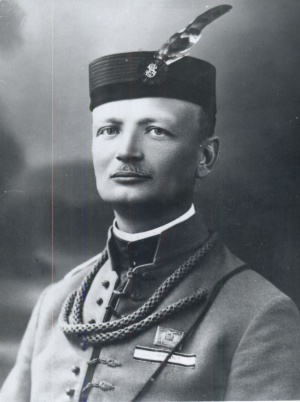
Jan Čapek

By the beginning of 1917, there were substantial numbers of Czech and Slovak prisoners of war in Italy. In late 1916, Italy had begun creation of internment camps according to nationality. One of the first camps designated for Czechs and Slovaks was Santa Maria Capua Vetere, near Naples. Here the Czechoslovak Corps of Volunteers was created under the leadership of Jan Čapek, a Sokol leader. Another camp was located at the Certosa di Padula near Salerno and this became the internment point for more than 10,000 Czech and Slovak prisoners in 1916-1918. This prisoner of war camp became the center of the Czechoslovak volunteers.

In this regard, in 1917, these efforts of the Czech deserters began to bear other fruit. The following (although instigated by a Slovene, involved numerous Czechs from his unit) is instructive and was reported in the Italian newspaper La Stampa (translated from Italian):

… from Austro-Hungarian captain Ljudevit Pivko, of Slovenian ethnicity… In Trentino, in 1917, Pivko and the others began to probe the front line, and at the risk of their lives reached the Italian trenches to meet "Captain Finzi" (the cover name for Major Pettorelli Lalatta), an officer in the secret services. The Austrians explained that they wanted to pick up apples abandoned in no man's land and avoid the danger of friendly fire. In the morning the small group of officers returned to their lines with baskets of apples for everyone. Pivko met Finzi several times and together they designed and signed a desertion agreement. … Pivko's plan was to deliver to Italy the Bosnian battalion of the Landsturm, stationed in Carzano, after having convinced all the soldiers (including many Czechs) of that group to comply: thus allowing the Italians to penetrate the Austro-Hungarian lines, breaking through the Valsugana to Trento. A whole army of the Empire would thus remain isolated from the national territory and in Carzano it would have been possible for a great and decisive battle. But this incredible opportunity was lost due to delays, distrust and hesitation of the Italian army. The attempt was suspended. Thus, in the autumn of 1917, Italy collected a substantial number of [Czech and] Slovenian ethnic refugees, including Pivko, who were not allowed to form a real foreign legion on the French model. The Slovenian defectors brought Italian uniforms with a special mark and were assigned to tasks ranging from the recognition of the territory to propaganda among the cross-border populations. From a formal point of view they were prisoners of war with a special status: free to move, use the railways and receive a financial contribution.

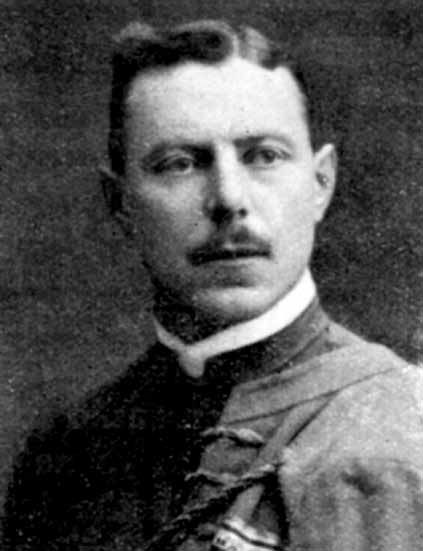
Capt. Ljudevit Pivko - 1917

These Esploratori units were limited to intelligence, propaganda and other defensive actions, and they would later become the 39th Regiment of the Czechoslovak Italian Legion.

Then the massive Italian defeat at the Battle of Caporetto in late 1917 altered the whole dynamic in Italy for the Czechs and Slovaks.

== After Caporetto, the Czechoslovak Legion of Italy Is Established ==
On 21 April 1918 the Prime Minister of the Kingdom of Italy Vittorio Emanuele Orlando signed, together with the Minister of War Vittorio Italico Zupelli and Colonel Štefánik, representing the Czechoslovak National Council, an agreement that created the Italian Czechoslovak Legion. During the negotiations, General Štefánik told the Prime Minister: "I do not request anything from you, but to allow our people to die for their ideals." Štefánik then received, on 24 May from Orlando, the Legion colors in a solemn ceremony at the Altare della Patria in Rome.

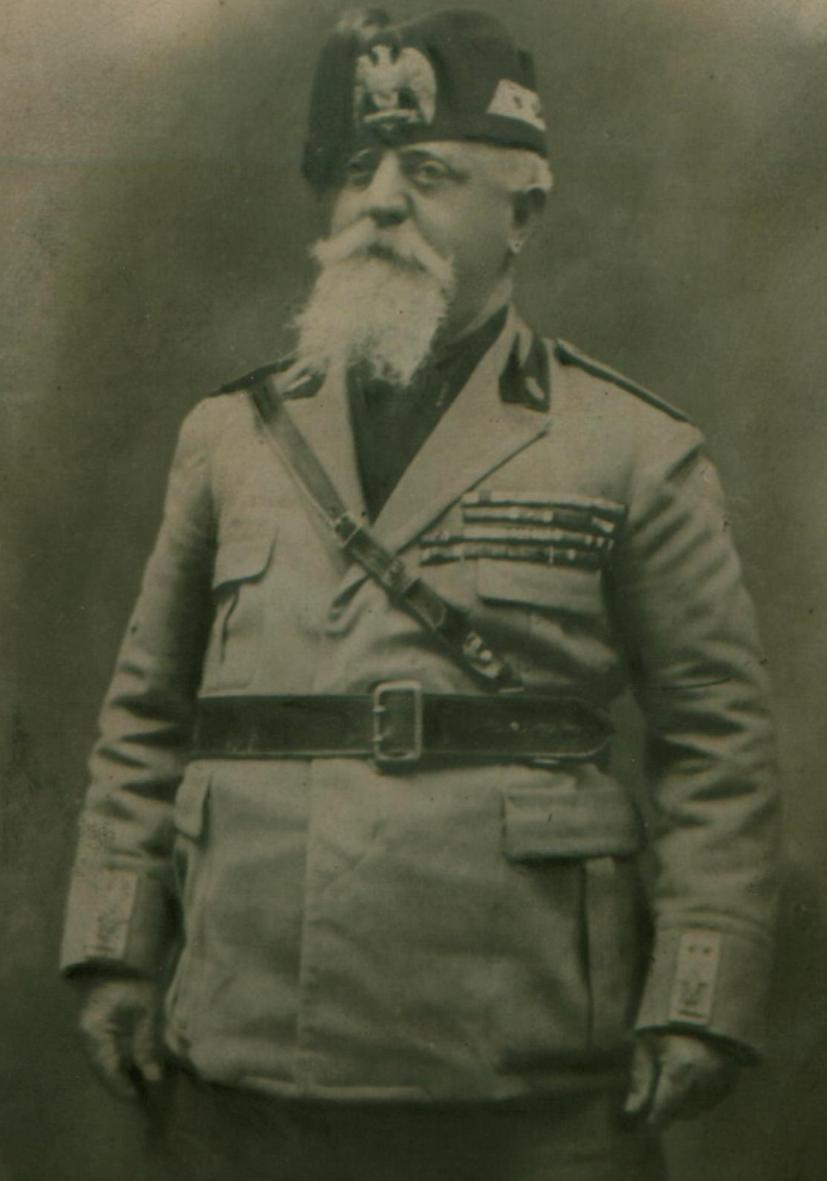
General Andrea Graziani

From the prisoner work battalions, four Infantry Regiments were formed, consisting of 13,653 soldiers and 489 officers, which then merged into two Brigades, taking the name of the Sixth Division Czechoslovak. They were placed under the command of General Andrea Graziani.

The Infantry Units were initially placed in the Euganean hills. However, some reconnaissance battalions were deployed at the Battle of Solstizio (Piave) in June 1918. Jan Čapek died in that Battle on his birthday, 17 June.

However, soon the Czechoslovak Regiments were actively deployed in some important battles on the Italian Front. After June, the Legion participated in Battles at Monte Valbella, Monte Asolone and Cima Tre Pezzi. Starting on 18 August 1918 the Legion had the task of defending the sector of Mount Altissimo di Nago, between Lake Garda and the Adige River. It was in this area that the Legion, in September 1918, participated in the battle of Dosso Alto.

The Czechoslovak Legion was also in reserve during the Battle of Vittorio Veneto in October 1918. Shortly thereafter, the Armistice of Villa Giusti concluded the Great War in Italy on 3 November 1918.

== The Post-war Czechoslovak Italian Legion ==
Czechoslovakia declared its independence from the disintegrating Austria-Hungary, on 28 October, during the Battle of Vittorio Veneto. By the beginning of December, the troops of the Czechoslovak Corps were concentrated in Padua (ready to be repatriated) under the command of General Luigi Piccione who had taken the command of the Corps on 26 November 1918. On 8 December King Vittorio Emanuele III, now President Tomáš Garrigue Masaryk of the Czechoslovak Republic (on 16 and 17 December) and the Chief of the Italian Army General Armando Diaz reviewed the Legion at Prato della Valle prior to their repatriation.

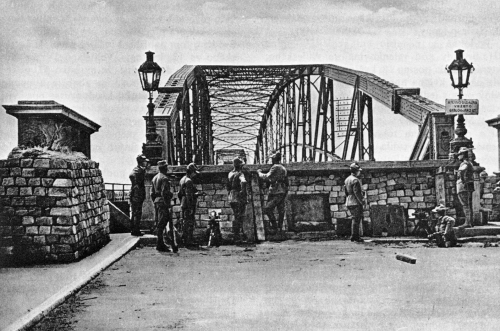
The Czechoslovak Legion from Italy at Komárno (May 1919)

That day the Legion troops began to leave Italy, transferred to Slovakia along the border with Hungary. The two divisions (6th and 7th) were still under the command of General Piccione, who was appointed as commander-in-chief in Kroměříž. Essentially, Piccione was running the Czechoslovak army.

However, other border incidents were taking place. In the Tešin mining basin, where the Poles wanted to seize these assets, troops from Slovakia came to support the main force in that dispute. This Slovak force was the 35th Regiment from Italy, led by Colonel Graselli and later reinforced with another Regiment from Italy.

Regardless, the main task of the Italian Legion was to police the demarcation line that the Foreign Minister of the new Czechoslovak Government, Edvard Beneš, had agreed in Paris to form a temporary Slovak-Hungarian border before setting definitive boundaries at the peace conference.

General Piccione divided the demarcation line into two sections. The western section, which extended from the Morava River to Oždany, occupied the 7th Legionary Division (Gen. Boriani) and the eastern section of the 6th Legionary Division (Gen. Rossi).

On 1 January 1919 the Legion troops took control of the city of Bratislava and Italian Colonel Riccardo Barreca was appointed military commander of the city. Several clashes (which killed at least nine Hungarian demonstrators) took place and Barreca himself was injured. The Italian officers continued to assist in the operations against the Hungarians during the Hungarian–Czechoslovak War.

A French military mission also began in Czech territories after January 1919. The head of the mission was General Maurice Pellé. After some disagreements with the Italian-led Czechs and Slovaks in Slovakia. As an example, General Piccione did not consider the agreed demarcation line to be militarily advantageous. Therefore, he decided to move his troops to the south into Hungary. Although he notified the Hungarian government, he advanced, on 16 January 1919, before any reply. The Hungarians disagreed with the new demarcation action. At the order of the Czechoslovak government, Piccione returned his troops to the original demarcation line. President Masaryk, eventually replaced Piccione with Pellé on 4 July 1919 and essentially ended the Italian connection to the Legion.

The French military mission's role was to integrate the existing Czechoslovak Foreign Legions with the home units of the Army and develop a professional command structure. On 15 October 1919 the main staff of the Czechoslovak Army was officially formed. French officers were installed as territorial commanders and commanders of some divisions. Over the course of time, there were 200 French non-commissioned officers, over 100 commissioned officers and 19 Generals. General Pellé and his immediate replacement, General Eugène Mittelhauser (also French), were the first chiefs staff of the Czechoslovak Army.

== See also ==
- Czechoslovak Legion in France
- Czechoslovak Legion
- Maffia
- Czechoslovak National Council
- cs:Jan Čapek (legionář)
- Ljudevit Pivko
- it:Cesare Pettorelli Lalatta Finzi
- it:Andrea Graziani
