= Josef Šnejdárek =

Czech general (1875–1945)

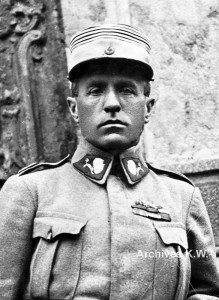
- Šnejdárek in uniform of the French Foreign Legion
- Born: 2 April 1875; Napajedla, Moravia, Austria-Hungary
- Died: 13 May 1945 (aged 70); Casablanca, French protectorate in Morocco
- Burial place: Casablanca (until 1996), Napajedla (since 1996)
- Military career
- Allegiance: Austria-Hungary; France; Czechoslovakia
- Branch: French Foreign Legion; Czechoslovak Army
- Service years: 1895–1935; 1940
- Rank: General of the army
- Conflicts: Second Franco-Moroccan War; World War I Polish–Czechoslovak War; Battle of Skoczów; Hungarian-Czechoslovak War; Battle of Zvolen (1919); World War II
- Awards: Czechoslovak War Cross 1918; Commander of the Légion d'honneur; Croix de guerre 1914–1918; Order of St Michael and St George

Josef Šnejdárek (2 April 1875 – 13 May 1945) was a Czech soldier. He served in the French Foreign Legion for 28 years, before joining the Czechoslovak Army. He saw service in World War I, the Polish–Czechoslovak War over Cieszyn Silesia and in the war with the Hungarian Soviet Republic over territories in what is now Slovakia. He claimed in his memoirs never to have lost a battle nor a duel.

== Early life and French Foreign Legion ==
Šnejdárek was born into a miller's family in Napajedla. After graduating from cadet school on 18 August 1895 he entered the Austro-Hungarian Army as a cadet, and sent to the 2nd Rear Regiment in Budapest. On 1 November 1895 he was promoted to lieutenant and transferred to the 14th Rear Battalion in Innsbruck. During this period, while on leave, he volunteered to fight with the Ottoman Army, which was defending Preveza against the Greeks. He spent 30 days in an Austrian Army prison as a result, and an injury from the engagement left a scar on his head. He left the Austro-Hungarian Army by request on 1 October 1896, and travelled around the Mediterranean Basin, North Africa and Central Africa for about two years.

Šnejdárek joined the French Foreign Legion on 24 January 1899, as a private, 2nd Class. His first military campaign began in the Sahara on 10 May 1900, and he was promoted to corporal on 26 September of that year, sergeant on 1 March the following year, and sergeant major on 1 April 1906, at which point he was awarded French citizenship and began studying. He graduated from military school in Saint-Maixent-l'École one year later, and was promoted to second lieutenant and transferred to the 1st Regiment of Algerian Gunners. On 1 April 1909 he was promoted to lieutenant. On 25 September 1911 he transferred to the 4th Regiment of Algerian Gunners, and began a military expedition in Morocco the following June, a couple of weeks after he was married. He transferred to 4th Regiment of the Colonial Infantry on 15 April 1913, and was sent for recuperative leave to Tunisia in July of that year.

== World War I ==
In World War I Šnejdárek fought on the Western Front. He first reached the German-French frontline as a secondary troop commander on 2 August 1914, and was wounded in the First Battle of the Aisne on 21 September, earning a promotion to captain and a citation in the army report for bravery. After his recovery he returned to the frontline on 12 February 1915, but was again wounded in the Battle of Arras four months later.

On 17 November 1917 he transferred as a Liaison officer to the Czechoslovak Army in France, and became adjutant of the commander of Czechoslovak 21st Regiment of Gunners on 21 January 1918. On 13 December that year he was promoted to major and appointed temporary commander of the 21st Regiment.

== Return to Czechoslovakia ==
On 4 January 1919 Šnejdárek returned to Czechoslovakia as a French citizen. Within two weeks he had been appointed commander of the Army Inspectorate of Moravian Ostrava (at the time the city was divided into Silesian and Moravia parts), promoted to lieutenant colonel and appointed commander of the Czechoslovak forces operating in Cieszyn Silesia. On 23 January his forces commenced military operation against Polish units, starting the Polish–Czechoslovak War. On 31 January, while Šnejdárek's troops were preparing for a battle at Skoczów, the Czechoslovak Minister of Defence called off the hostilities, and the war ended.

Šnejdárek was promoted to colonel on 23 February 1919, and appointed Czechoslovak delegate to The Entente Commission in Warsaw. On 31 May he became the commander of the 2nd infantry division, which was in conflict with the Hungarian Soviet Republic in modern-day Central Slovakia. His troops began their offensive against the Hungarian Bolsheviks on 10 June, and three days later won an engagement in Zvolen.

On 17 September 1919 he was appointed commander of the Prague garrison, and on 30 December he was part of a French Army mission in Czechoslovakia. On 19 November 1920 was promoted to brigadier general, and on 29 December he was appointed commander of the 9th Infantry Division in Trnava. On 24 November 1921, during Czechoslovak mobilisation, he was appointed commander of the Danube sector, then later the 7th Infantry Division in Olomouc (31 January 1923) and the 11th Infantry Division in Košice (1 December 1924). He was promoted to major general on 10 February 1925, and appointed army commander in Košice on 15 September 1925. On 7 June 1926 he was promoted to lieutenant general.

It was not until 1927 that Šnejdárek formally left the French Army, being declared cleared from duties on 15 February. He then joined the Czechoslovak Army.

== Czechoslovak Army ==
Šnejdárek submitted his Czechoslovak citizenship certificate on 16 February 1927 and was accepted into the Czechoslovak Army.

He was promoted to general on 13 November 1930. In 1932 he gave orders to fortify Petržalka with concrete bunkers, nine of which were built. He was appointed army commander in Bratislava on 31 December of that year. In September 1933 he received annual evaluation beyond praise from chief staff officer general Jan Syrový, but the following year his evaluation from new chief staff officer General Krejčí was negative, and Krejčí began to put pressure on Šnejdárek to retire. After a period of leave in 1935, Šnejdárek was given his retirement notice on 28 June 1935.

== Later life ==
After his retirement, Šnejdárek lived in Bratislava. On 20 November 1938 he was appointed commander of the National Gunners Guards. He was still living in Bratislava on the establishment of the Slovak Fascist State on 14 March 1939, and two weeks later he was removed from his position as commander of the National Gunners Guards.

He left for exile in France on 2 June, resuming active military duty in 1940 with the Czechoslovak Exile Army. When France was defeated by Nazi Germany he went to French North Africa, where he died on 13 May 1945, in Casablanca. In 1996 his remains were transferred from Casablanca to the family grave in Napajedla.

== Personal life ==
Šnejdárek married Cathérine de Constantin on 4 June 1912. They had two children, Miriam (born 1 August 1915) and Jiří (born 11 July 1920).

== Decorations ==
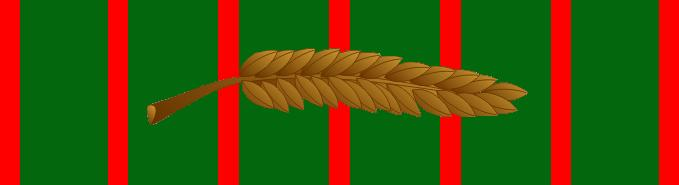
Croix de guerre 1914–1918 with Palm
Croix de guerre TOE
Colonial Medal with Algeria and Sahara Clasps
Morocco commemorative medal
Tunisian Order of Glory IV. Class
Legion of Honour, Knight
Insignia for the Military Wounded
Czechoslovak War Cross 1918 with Oak Leaves
Legion of Honour, Officer
World War I Victory Medal
Czechoslovak Revolutionary Medal
Order of St Michael and St George, III. Class
Order of the Crown of Italy III. Class - Commander
Order of St. Sava, I Class
Order of the Star of Romania, I. Class with Swords
Order of Ouissam Alaouite, II. Class
Verdun Medal
Legion of Honour, Commander
Romanian Order of the Crown, I. Class with Swords

== Works ==
In 1939 Šnejdárek published his autobiography, Co jsem prožil ("What I Lived Through"). It was published again in 1994 under the name Pochoduj, nebo zemři! ("March or Die!").
