= French Military Mission to Czechoslovakia =

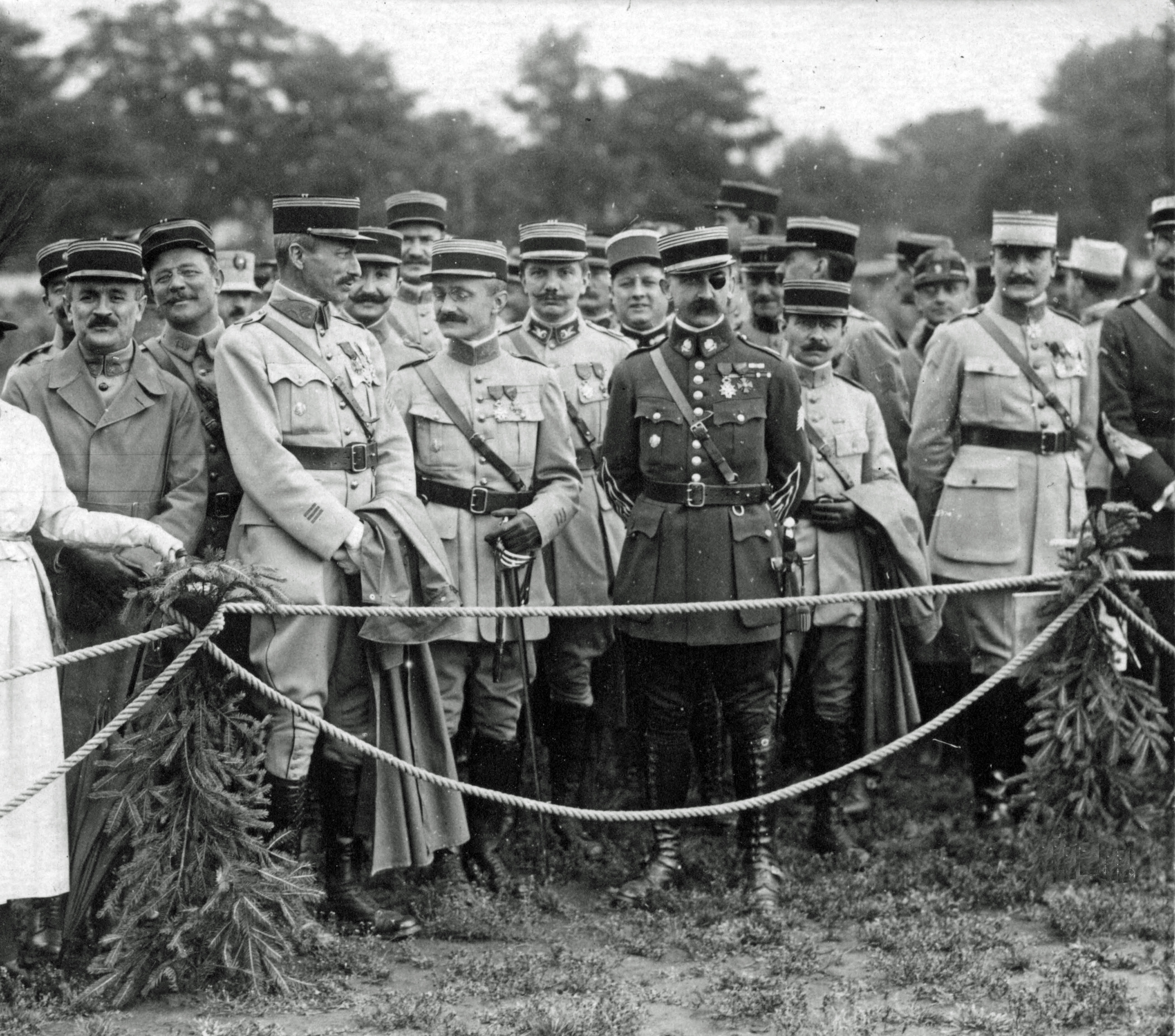
Members of the French Military Mission in Prague in 1920

The French Military Mission in Czechoslovakia (Note: French: Mission militaire française en Tchécoslovaquie; Czech: Francouzská vojenská mise v Československu; Slovak: Francúzska vojenská misia v Československu), which was established in Prague on 13 February 1919, played a significant role in shaping the new Czechoslovak Army in terms of strategic goals, command structure, and the development of military educational institutions.

== Background ==
During World War I, Czech and Slovak soldiers from the Czechoslovak Legion fought alongside the Entente. Among other things, they were used on the Western Front, finally as an autonomous unit within the French Army, which was recorded in a decree of the French government under Prime Minister Georges Clemenceau of 16 December 1917. This recognition as an independent army, which was considered an Allied army, dates back to the efforts of the Czechoslovak National Council in Paris, which had been organizing the recruitment of soldiers for the Legion since 1916. The National Council, whose representatives were Tomáš Masaryk, Edvard Beneš and Milan Rastislav Štefánik (then a general of the French Army), was recognized on 28 June 1918, first by France and later by other Allied powers. Already on 14 October, i.e. before the formation of Czechoslovakia on 28 October 1918, the National Council transformed itself into the so-called Provisional Czecho-Slovak Government. It was immediately internationally recognized as the acting Czechoslovak government-in-exile and replaced on 14 November 1918, by the first regular government of Karel Kramář, with Štefánik as the first Minister of War.

== History ==
After its foundation in 1918, the First Czechoslovak Republic, based on previous positive experiences, considered the French Third Republic its most important ally. On the other hand, it also played an important role in French alliance planning due to its strategic position – but only if it was militarily at a high level. The new Czechoslovak government also wanted to solve this problem and at the end of 1918 turned to the French government for help in building an army. This also corresponded to France's intentions. Marshal Ferdinand Foch, the Supreme Commander of the Allied armies at the end of the war, took responsibility for the Czechoslovak Army and insisted on the rapid establishment of new combat-ready divisions that could be used against Germany if necessary.

After the conclusion of the relevant treaties between France and Czechoslovakia in January 1919, a French military mission arrived in Prague in February 1919 to secure these goals. Its tasks consisted of establishing a functioning Ministry of Defence, building a General Staff, and also establishing military training centers at all levels. The mission had a great influence on the Czechoslovak Army, because the relevant commander of the mission was also the Chief of the General Staff. This brought the mission great recognition when the first commander, Maurice Pellé, successfully defended the integrity of the new state in the conflict with Hungary in the spring of 1919.

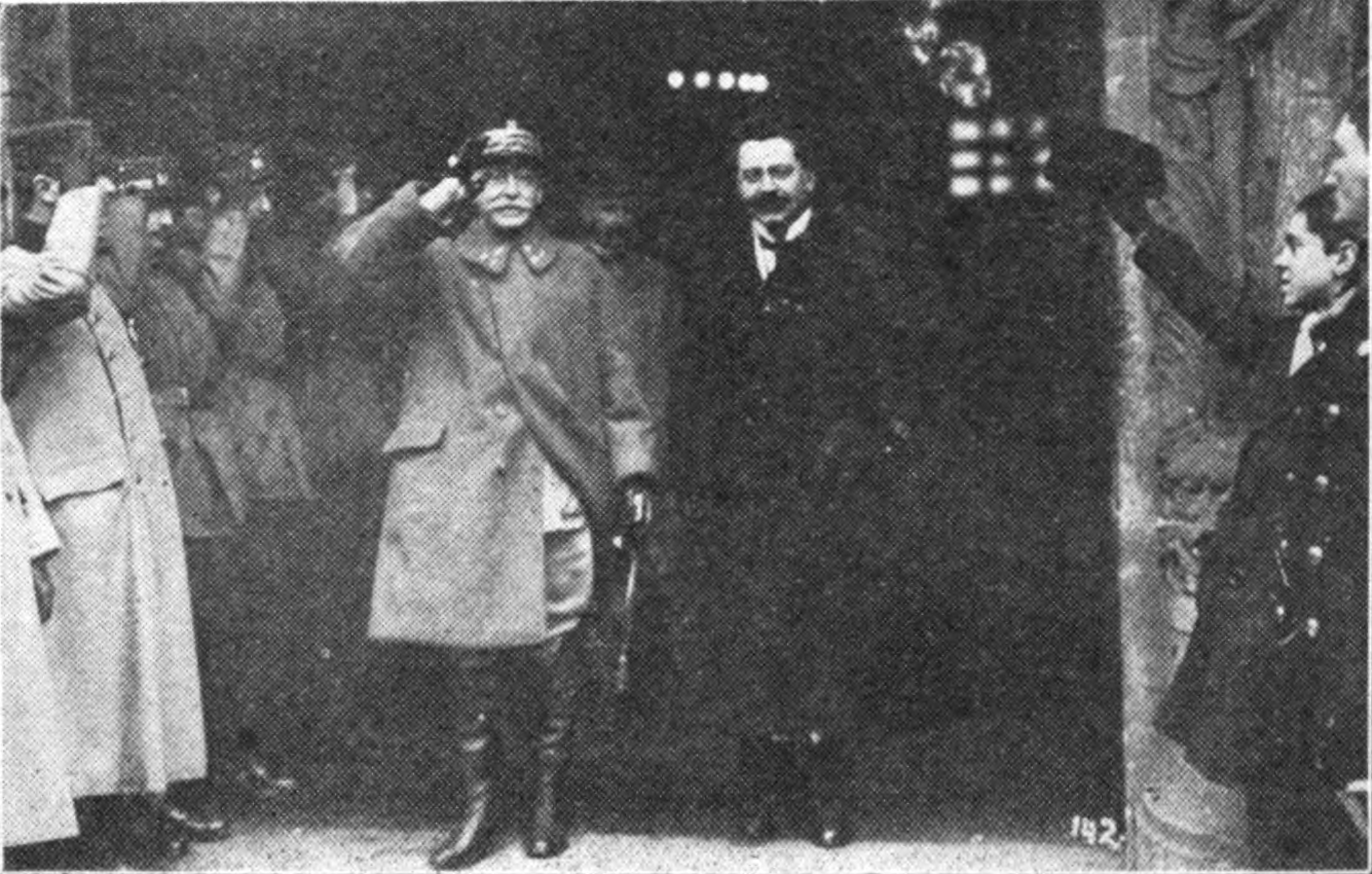
Maurice Pellé with Minister of National Defence Václav Klofáč in 1919

Already in the first phase of the mission's activities, important cornerstones of the future army were laid. The Ministry of Defence was successfully reorganized as early as 1919, with some of the mission's departments becoming part of the ministry. General Pellé also had a great influence on the government's draft military law, which was adopted in March 1920. From July 1919, the General Staff was able to work normally. The mission staff prepared studies and significantly influenced the first operational plan of the General Staff of May 1919 and in particular the studies on warfare with Germany, Hungary and Poland at the end of 1920.

The mission also participated in the establishment of military training facilities. Important in this regard was the establishment of the War College on 1 November 1919 in Prague and its subsequent operation, the structure of which was based on the French École supérieure de guerre in Paris. The mission also influenced educational institutions of the middle and lower levels.

On 1 January 1926, President of Czechoslovakia Tomáš Masaryk issued a decree that the French mission was to have a purely advisory role. The higher command positions in the General Staff were taken over by Czechoslovak officers: the first Czechoslovak Chief of the General Staff was General Jan Syrový, who had already taken over the newly created post of Deputy Chief of the General Staff in 1924. However, French officers remained active in various positions until 1938.

Cooperation between the two allies was underlined by the Treaty of Alliance and Friendship signed between France and Czechoslovakia on 25 January 1924.

== Criticism ==
The mission was criticized by some officers. The reasons were the inability to provide officers with equipment, outdated methods of warfare, and the disproportionately high salaries of the French generals (they were on a similar level to the presidential salary). A prominent critic was the provincial commander for Moravia and Silesia, General Alois Podhajský.

== Mission staff ==
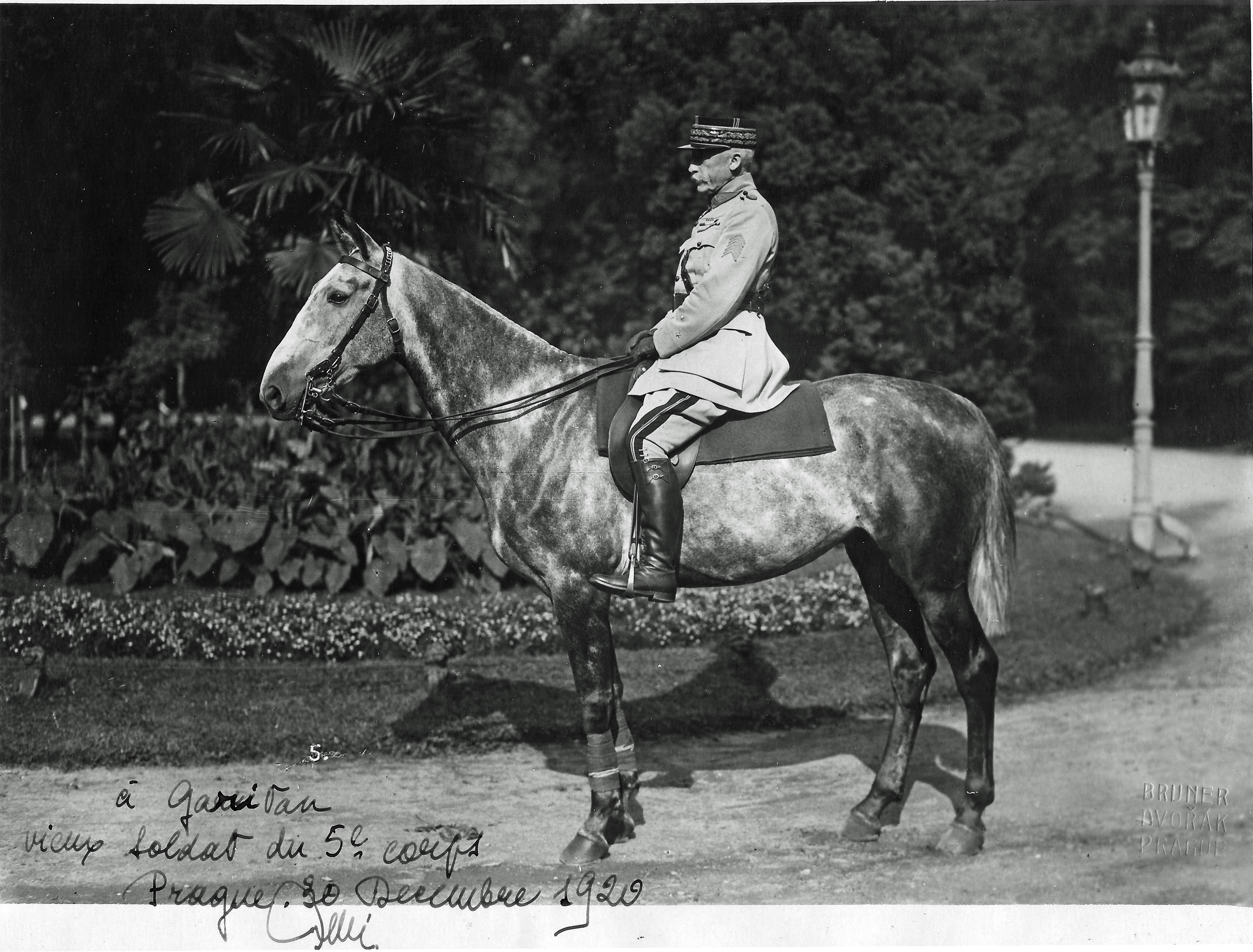
First commander of the French Military Mission Maurice Pellé in 1920

=== Heads of the Mission ===
The following military officers took up the position of commander of the French Military Mission in Czechoslovakia:

- 1919–1921: Général de division Maurice Pellé
- 1921–1926: Général de division Eugène Mittelhauser
- 1926–1938: Général de corps d'armée Louis-Eugène Faucher

While Pellé and Mittelhauser also held the position of Chief of the General Staff, Faucher did not held this position.

=== Number of officers ===
Upon the arrival of the mission in Prague, it had 45 members (in March 1919); the highest number was recorded in mid-September 1919 with 146 officers, and on 1 January 1920, it was 135 officers. After that, their number continuously decreased: 85 officers on 1 January 1921, 50 officers on 1 January 1925, 7 officers on 1 January 1931; on 1 January 1938, there were still 4 French officers in Czechoslovakia.

== See also ==
- Interwar period
- Little Entente
- Cordon sanitaire (international relations)
- Western betrayal
- French Military Mission to Poland
