= Antonín Janoušek =

Czechoslovak politician (1877–1941)

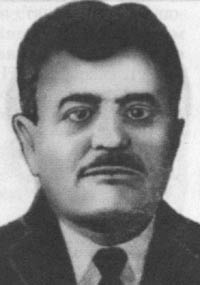

Chairman of the Revolutionary Committee of the Slovak Soviet Republic
- In office 20 June 1919 – 7 July 1919
- Preceded by: Post established
- Succeeded by: Post abolished

Personal details
- Born: 22 August 1877 Nymburk, Bohemia, Austria-Hungary
- Died: 30 March 1941 (aged 63) Moscow, Russian SFSR, Soviet Union
- Resting place: Olšany Cemetery
- Party: Hungarian Communist Party; Czechoslovak Communist Party

Antonín Janoušek (22 August 1877 – 30 March 1941) was a Czech journalist and communist politician. He was the leader of the short-lived Slovak Soviet Republic.

== Life and career ==
Originally an engine fitter, in 1895, Janoušek became a member of the Czechoslavonic Social Democratic Workers' Party. In 1906, he became a workers journalist and a functionary of workers associations in Austria-Hungary.

=== Communist activities ===
In 1919, Janoušek led the Czech and Slovak section at the central committee of the Hungarian Communist Party. He was the only "chairman of the revolutionary committee" (predseda revolučného výboru) of the short-lived Slovak Soviet Republic, proclaimed in Prešov on 20 June 1919. The republic was created with military support from the Hungarian Soviet Republic. After the Hungarians were pushed out by troops of the First Czechoslovak Republic following the Hungarian–Czechoslovak War of 1918–1919, the Slovak Soviet Republic ceased to exist on 7 July 1919.

=== Later life ===
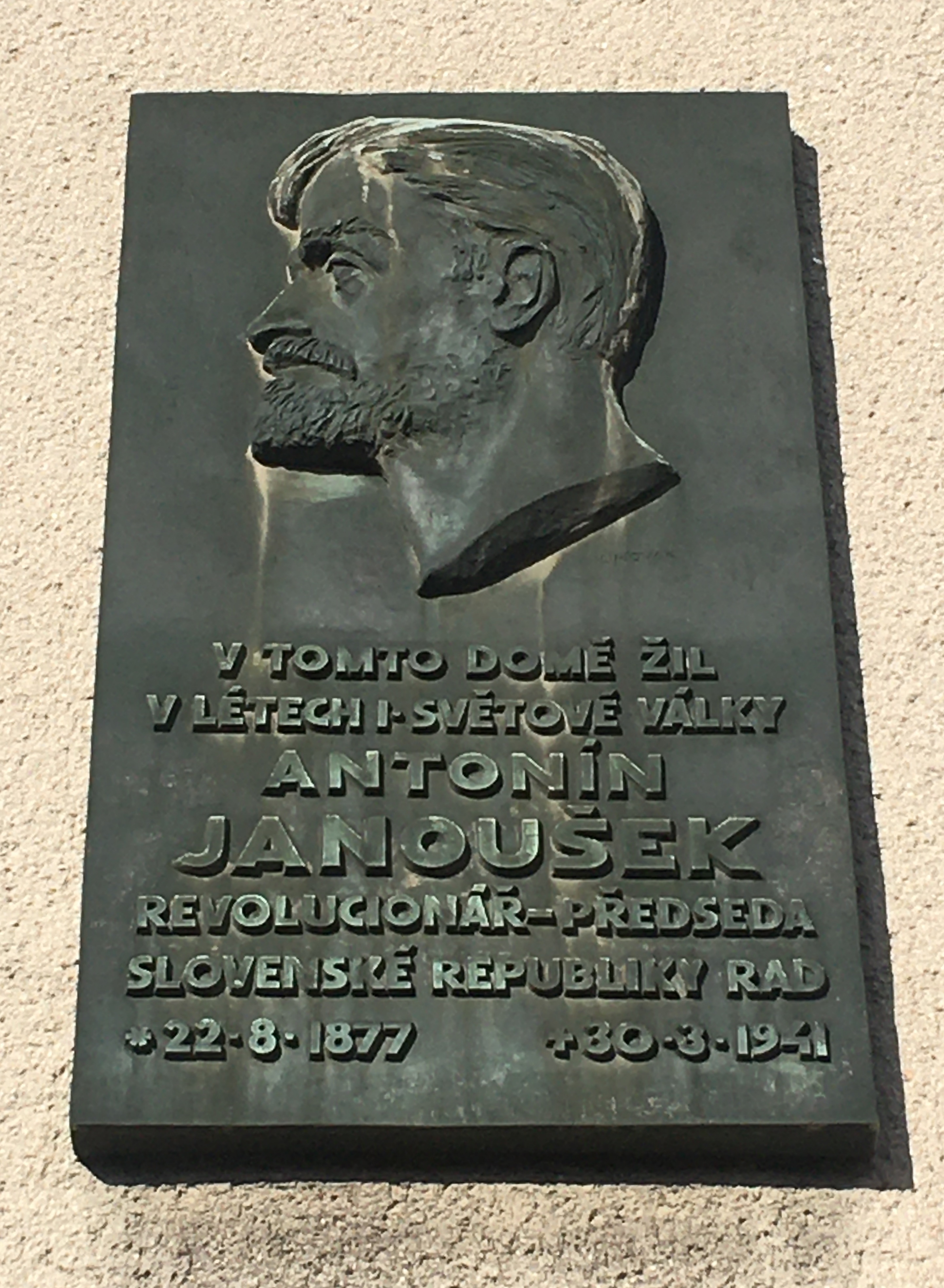
Memorial plaque of Janoušek in Kladno in Unhošťská street

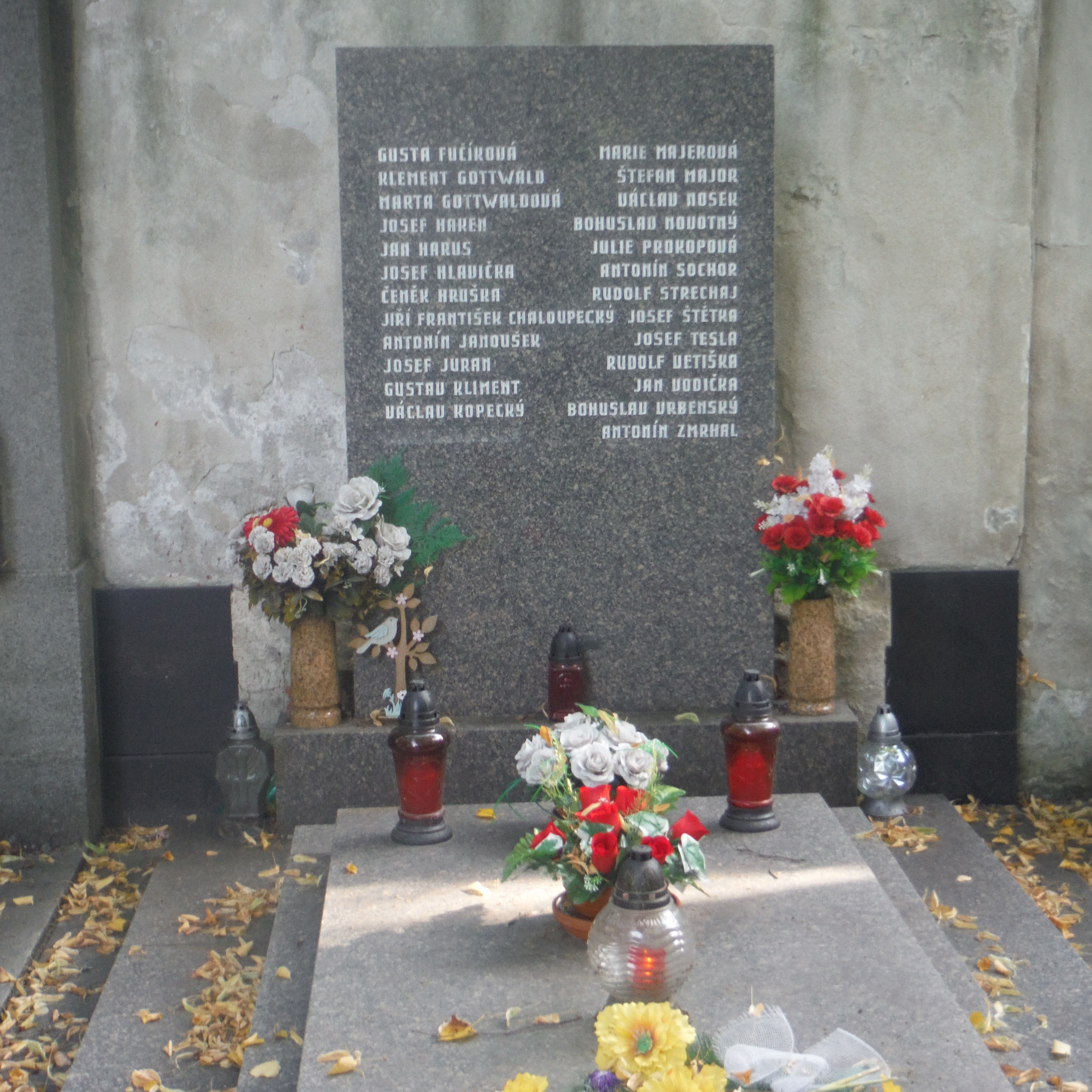
Grave of Czech Communist politicians at Olšany Cemetery whose urns had originally been kept at the National Monument at Vítkov

Janoušek was imprisoned by the regime of Miklós Horthy in Hungary in 1920, and subsequently handed over to Czechoslovak authorities. In 1922, he moved to Soviet Russia, where he became a functionary of the International Workers Aid Council. He lived in Cheboksary, Chuvashia where he established an orphanage.

Janoušek died "in bed" of natural causes as reported by the historian V. Nálevka. After cremation, his remains were buried at the Jan Žižka National Monument at Vítkov. In 1990, his ashes were moved to Olšany Cemetery, together with those of about 20 other communist leaders which had also originally been placed in the Jan Žižka National Monument.
