= Ljudevit Pivko =

Slovenian teacher, politician and World War I military personnel

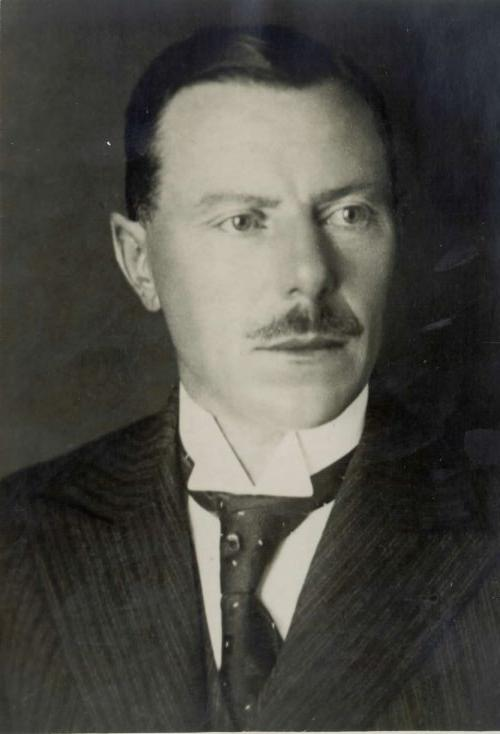
- Ljudevit Pivko in c. 1930s
- Born: 17 August 1880; Nova Vas pri Markovcih, Austria-Hungary (nowadays Slovenia)
- Died: 29 March 1937 (aged 56) Maribor, Drava Banate, Kingdom of Yugoslavia
- Allegiance: Kingdom of Italy; Slovenia
- Branch: Russian Army; White Army; Czechoslovak Legion
- Service years: 1914–1918
- Conflicts: World War I

Ljudevit Pivko (17 August 1880 – 29 March 1937) was a Slovenian teacher, writer, panslavist and World War I military officer. In September 1917 he escaped with his unit over the Italian lines to join Italian Army ranks and then continued in a fight against Austria-Hungary. After the establishment of the State of Slovenes, Croats and Serbs Pivko became one of the most commemorated Slovenian war veterans of World War I.

== Early life and education ==
Pivko was born in Nova Vas pri Markovcih village, part of the Austro-Hungarian Empire, nowadays Slovenia. He attended the municipal school in Sv. Marko and then grammar schools in Varaždin, Ptuj and finally Maribor, where he graduated in 1900. During his Slavic and German studies at Charles-Ferdinand University in Prague he became fascinated with the concept of Pan-Slavism. Continuing in his studies at Vienna University he received his doctorate and after that attended on a position of a substitute teacher at the classical gymnasium in Maribor.

In 1906, he married the Czech Ljudmila (Ludmila) Mužíková, the daughter of the director of a savings bank, together they had seven children. In the same year, he joined the co-founders of the Czech-origin Sokol sport organization in Maribor. He became an excellent gymnast, a promoter of the Sokol Slavic national defense idea, and one of the most important Sokol leaders in Slovenia. Under the pseudonyms Pavel Poljanec and Janko Osojnik Pivko published his first works and essays shaped by his radically liberal views.

=== First World War ===
After the outbreak of World War I Pivko was drafted to the Austro-Hungarian Army and sent to the Montenegrin war front. There he tried to establish contact with the enemies of Austria-Hungary and flee the service for the empire, which he hated, but failed. As the commander of the 5th Column (Battalion) of the 1th Bosnia-Herzegovinian Infantry Regiment in 1916 was transferred to Tolmin on the Italian Front. There Pivko finally made a contact with the Italians and planned the escape of his unit on the other side of the front. Idea was subsequently improved to an ambitious action, when Pivko's regiment should let the attacking Italians get through the Austro-Hungarian lines and eventually start the Italian invasion to the South Tyrol. However, action set at the night of 17–18 September 1917 failed because of incompetence and mistakes of the Italian commanders. Neverthenless, so called "Carzano Attack" already during the war resonated as something exceptional and unique through the whole conflict.

Until the end of the war Pivko served as an Italian Army officer among approximately 500 other Slovenians who joined the fight against Austria-Hungary. He also helped to establish the Yugoslav and Czechoslovak volunteer units in Italy.

=== Post-war period ===
Ljudevit Pivko: Against Austria (1924)

In 1922, he became one of the co-founders of the Maribor Yugoslav-Czechoslovak League and later its president until 1930, also contributed by his work in Slovenian School Association, Association of Cultural Societies, Maribor National House Loan Fund or as a secretary of the National Council for Slovenian Styria. As a member of the Yugoslav Democratic Party (later the SDS) Pivko ran for the office in the municipal government and also in the Constituent Assembly, but with no success. Being a deputy he became a representative Belgrade Assembly, where he intervened several times in connection with economic issues that mainly plagued Slovene farmers, craftsmen and teachers. In the next years Pivko won the seat again several times. In 1930, he was appointed to the newly formed council of the Drava Banat, as one of the three representatives of the city of Maribor. After 1935, he was briefly employed at the Maribor Real Gymnasium.

In 1936, he became seriously ill and underwent surgery in Zagreb. Resumíng all of his activities in early 1937 he died on 29 March 1937 in Maribor and was buried in the Pobrežje cemetery.

=== Family ===
His son Svetopolk Pivko (1910–1987), a mechanical engineer and technical designer, who received his doctorate from the Sorbonne in Paris, where he dealt with the problems of vertical take-off. After World War II, he became the co-founder and head of the Aeronautical Technical Institute in Žarkovo near Belgrade, where he lectured as a university professor of mechanics and also became a member of the Serbian Academy of Sciences and Arts (SASA).

== Literature ==
- Stanonik, Tončka; Brenk, Lan (2008). "Maček, Ivan". Osebnosti: veliki slovenski biografski leksikon. Ljubljana: Mladinska knjiga. p. 647.
