= Josef Votruba =

General of the army Josef Votruba
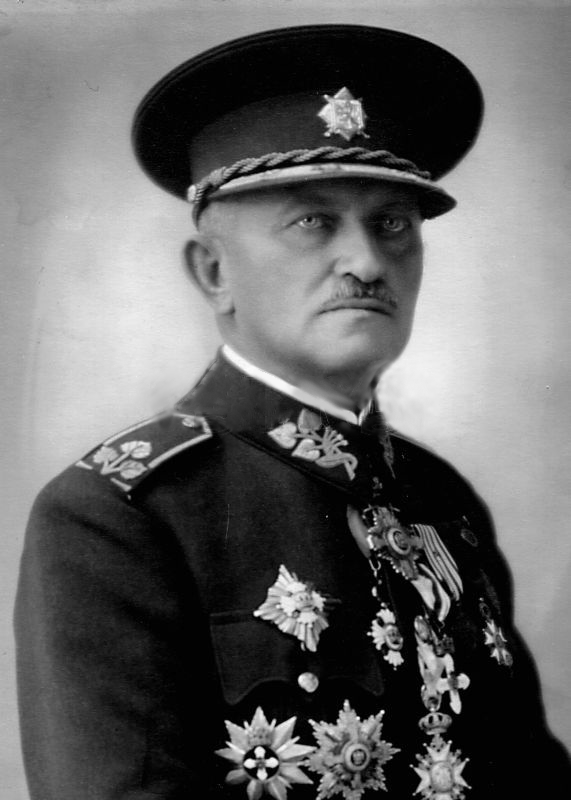
- Born: November 8, 1879; Mladá Boleslav, Bohemia, Austria-Hungary
- Died: October 7, 1959 (aged 79); Prague, Czechoslovak Socialist Republic
- Military career
- Allegiance: Austria-Hungary; Czechoslovakia
- Branch: Austro-Hungarian Army; Czechoslovak Army
- Service number: 1896 — 1939; 1946 — 1948
- Conflicts: World War I: Second Battle of the Piave River; Hungarian–Czechoslovak War

Josef Votruba was a Czechoslovak officer and a man persecuted by the communist regime of Czechoslovakia. In 1938 he was commander of III Army Stefanik and Land Commander in Slovakia and Subcarpathian Russia. He was a supporter of active defensive tactics.

== Biography ==
Votruba was born into the family of Josef Votruba and Marie née Nedvědová. In September 1896 he began studying at the Cadet School for Earth Shields in Vienna, followed by studying at the War School. When World War I began, Votruba participated on the Russian front, later fighting in Istria and the Second Battle of the Piave River. After the end of the First World War, he interrupted his military career for some time and took the place of the Czechoslovak Plenipotentiary in Vienna. However, his official position did not suit him, so in the spring of 1919 he took part in the Hungarian–Czechoslovak War. He remained in the army and rose in his career. On January 1, 1937, he was promoted to the rank of Army General. In the time of general mobilization in 1938 Votruba was entrusted with the command of III army Štefánik and responsible for the defense of Slovakia and Subcarpathian Russia, which consisted of seven divisions. His staff was based in Kremnica. After the Munich betrayal, he commanded a short time from October 1938 IV. army in South Moravia, but due to rapidly deteriorating diabetes, he was forced to apply for retirement. He officially retired on January 1, 1939. At that time he lived in Bratislava, from where he moved to Bohemia after the establishment of the Slovak state. He lost both legs due to advancing diabetes. His wife, of German descent, applied for German citizenship in 1942. This fact was the subject of an investigation after the end of World War II, which showed that she did it for better access to food stamps for her sick husband and not because of sympathy for the Nazis. Then, on May 1, 1946, Votruba was returned to his original rank with a corresponding pension. After the 1948 Czechoslovak coup d'état, he was demoted to a soldier and his pension was taken away and he was forced to move out of Prague. He died on October 7, 1959.

== Awards ==
- Austria-Hungary: Military Merit Medal, Bronze (1914)
- Austria-Hungary: Military Merit Medal, Silver (1915)
- Austria-Hungary: Order of the Iron Crown, II Class (1916)
- Belgium: Order of Leopold, V Class, (1918)
- Czechoslovakia: Czechoslovak War Cross 1918 (1919)
- France: Legion of Honour, IV Class, officer (1929)
- German Empire: Iron Cross, II Class (1916)
- German Empire: Order of the Red Eagle, II Class (1918)
- Greece: Medal of Military Merit (1931)
- Lithuania: Order of Vytautas the Great, II. class, commander with a star (1931)
- Romania: Order of the Star of Romania, II Class (1931)
- Romania: Order of the Star of Romania, I Class (1936)
- Yugoslavia: Order of St. Sava, III Class (1930)
- Yugoslavia: Order of the Yugoslav Crown, II class (1931)

== Bibliography ==
- VALIŠ, Zdeněk PhDr., Article Army General Josef Votruba, magazine Vojenské rozhledy 3/2000; available on-line
- BRABEC, Martin Bc., Article Commanders of the Four Armies, magazine Válka revue - special Boj o Československo (Válka revue Extra publishing, s. R. O., Brno, 2012)
- Válka.cz, Army General Josef Votruba
