= Terron-sur-Aisne =

- Part of Vouziers
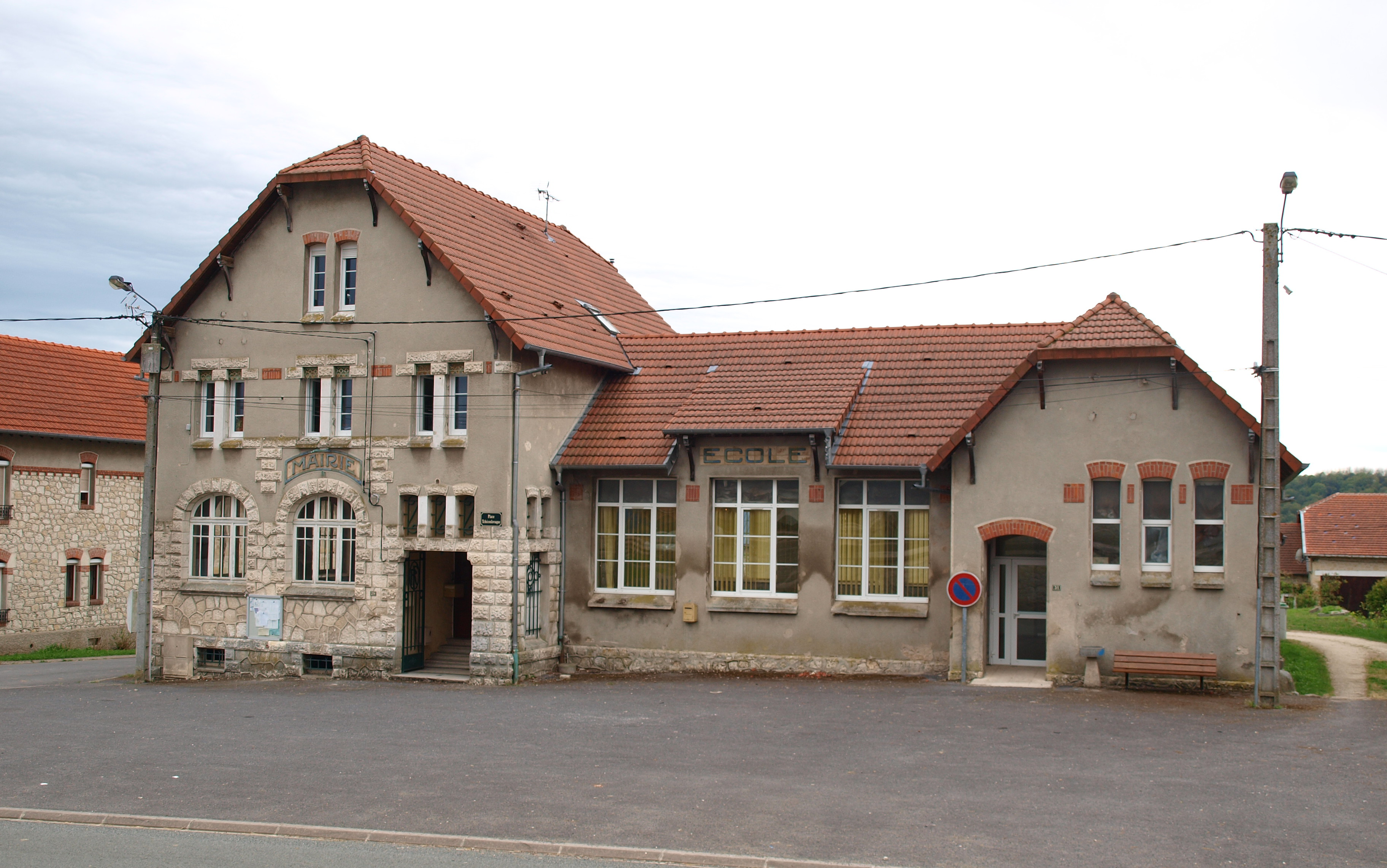
- Town hall
- Location of Terron-sur-Aisne
- Location within France Location within Grand Est
- Coordinates: 49°27′12″N 4°41′51″E
- Country: France
- Region: Grand Est
- Department: Ardennes
- Arrondissement: Vouziers
- Canton: Vouziers
- Commune: Vouziers
- Area^{1}: 6.5 km^{2} (2.5 sq mi)
- Elevation: 105 m (344 ft)
- Population (2023): 127
  - Density: 20/km^{2} (51/sq mi)
- Time zone: UTC+01:00 (CET)
  - Summer (DST): UTC+02:00 (CEST)
- Postal code: 08400
- ^{1} French Land Register data, which excludes lakes, ponds, glaciers > 1 km^{2} (0.386 sq mi or 247 acres) and river estuaries.

Terron-sur-Aisne (French pronunciation: [tɛʁɔ̃ syʁ ɛːn]; literally "Terron on Aisne") is a former commune in the Ardennes department in northern France. On 1 June 2016, it was merged into the commune of Vouziers.

== See also ==
- Communes of the Ardennes department
