= Slovak Soviet Republic =

Socialist state in southeast Slovakia (1919)

Slovak Soviet Republic Slovenská republika rád (Slovak) Szlovák Tanácsköztársaság (Hungarian) Словацька Радянська Республіка (Ukrainian)
- 1919
- Flag Emblem
- Motto: "Proletari šickich krajin, spojte še!" "Workers of the world, unite!"
- Anthem: "Internacionála"; The Internationale
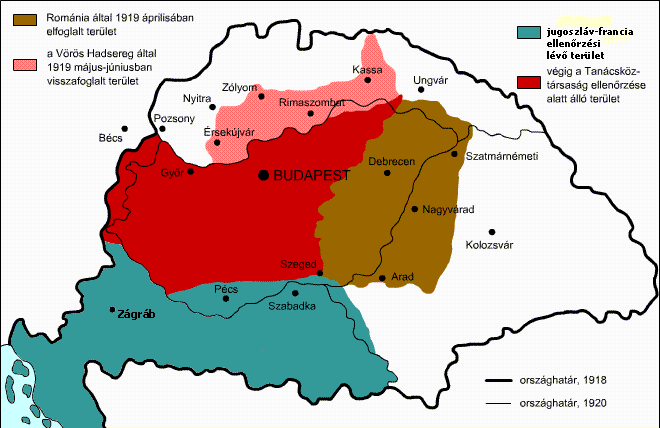
- Slovak Soviet Republic
- Status: Puppet state of the Hungarian Soviet Republic
- Capital: Prešov
- Common languages: Slovak (Šariš dialect); Hungarian; Ukrainian
- Government: Soviet socialist republic
- Chairman of the Revolutionary Government Council
  - 1919: Antonín Janoušek
- Historical era: Interwar period
  - Proclaimed: 16 June 1919
  - Hungarian withdrawal: 7 July 1919
- ISO 3166 code: SK
Preceded by
Czechoslovak Republic (1918–1938)
Hungarian Soviet Republic
Ukrainian Soviet Socialist Republic
Succeeded by
Czechoslovak Republic (1918–1938)

The Slovak Soviet Republic (Slovak: Slovenská republika rád, Hungarian: Szlovák Tanácsköztársaság, Ukrainian: Словацька Радянська Республіка, romanized: Slovatska Radianska Respublika, lit. 'Slovak Republic of Councils') was a short-lived communist state in southeastern Slovakia in existence from 16 June 1919 to 7 July 1919. Its capital city was Prešov, and it was established and headed by Czech journalist Antonín Janoušek. It was the fourth communist state created in history.

The Slovak Soviet Republic was created under the influence of the Hungarian Soviet Republic during the transitional wave of communist protests and revolutions after the October Revolution in 1917 and World War I. It was dependent on Budapest, and in the background of its creation were efforts to restore the Kingdom of Hungary - which had disappeared shortly before at the end of 1918 - by the Hungarian Soviet Republic.

It was the first attempt to establish a proletarian state in Slovakia.

== History ==
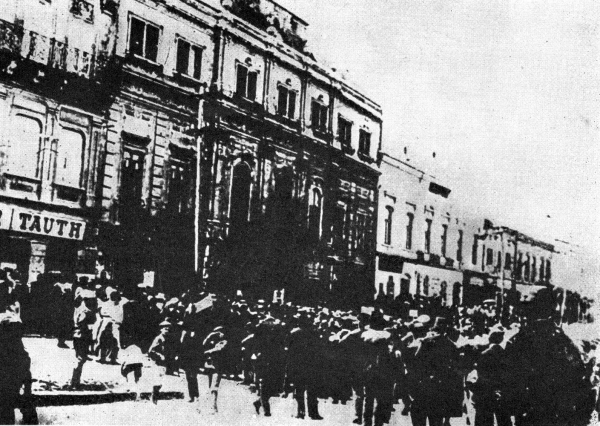
Proclamation of the Slovak Soviet Republic in Prešov (16 June 1919)

In 1918, the Czechoslovak Army occupied northern Hungary up to the demarcation line set by the Entente Powers. After the communist takeover of Hungary in March 1919, and the subsequent Romanian invasion that only halted at the Tisza River, Czechoslovakia also crossed its demarcation line in late April. However, Hungary successfully repulsed their attacks, and in June launched a counter-attack into Upper Hungary (today mostly Slovakia) known as the Northern Campaign. In the occupied territory, the soviets helped set up a Slovak Soviet Republic (SSR) out of collaborating Slovak communists. The highest Slovak representative proclaimed, on 16 June:

"Today the proletariat in Slovakia has proclaimed a republic; we have seized power, relying on the workers and the armed council of the proletariat."

Throughout its brief existence, it was ambiguous if it was an autonomous part or fully independent of Hungary, or what its exact borders were. It was mostly populated by ethnic Hungarians. According to Jaroslav Šebek:

“Although the state was created under the guise of spreading both communist and revolutionary ideas, it can also be said that it was a cover for the renewal of Hungarian influence in Slovakia.”

The government of the SSR issued a decree on the socialization of the means of production, the nationalization of factories with over 20 workers, large estates and financial institutions. It developed a plan for the creation of new production relations in agriculture, stopped the activities of normal courts and replaced them with “revolutionary tribunals”, nationalized schools, established the Slovak “Red Army” and the security corps “Red Guard”. However, due to the short duration of the SSR, these communist measures could not be implemented. The existence of the SSR was tied to the fate of the Hungarian Soviet Republic. The goal of the SSR and the HSR was the unification and creation of a communist restored Hungary. Béla Kun said in his speech in Košice on 10 June 1919:

"We Bolsheviks are for the integrity of Hungary. No change in borders will satisfy us, we want Hungary as a whole."

Throughout June, the Paris Peace Conference pressured Hungary to withdraw to its demarcation lines, offering Romania would do the same in turn. Hungary eventually agreed, ceasing hostilities on 24 June, withdrawing to the demarcation line by July. With that the Slovak Soviet Republic also ceased to exist, and its territory was incorporated into Czechoslovakia.

== Memorial ==
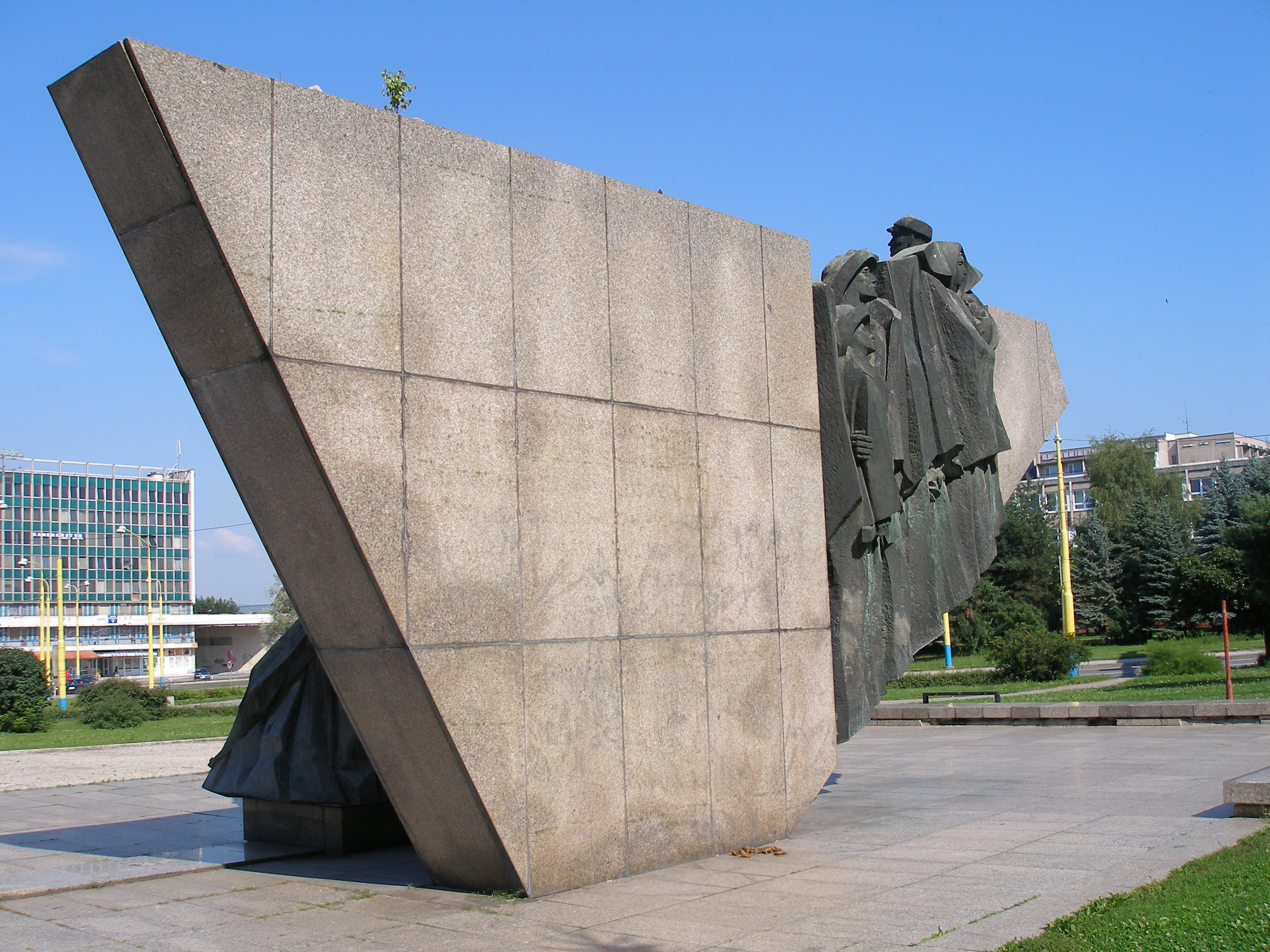
Slovak Soviet Republic Memorial in Prešov

== See also ==
- Hungarian Soviet Republic (Council Republic of Hungary)
- Hungarian–Czechoslovak War
- Ukrainian Soviet Socialist Republic
- German Revolution of 1918–1919
- Spartacist uprising

== Bibliography ==
- Toma, Peter A. (1958). "The Slovak Soviet Republic of 1919". American Slavic & East European Review. 17 (2): 203–215. doi:10.2307/3004167. JSTOR 3004167.
