= Eugène Mittelhauser =

Eugène Mittelhauser (7 August 1873 – 19 December 1949) was a French general, leader of the French Military Mission to Czechoslovakia and second chief of staff of the Czechoslovak Army from 1921 to 1925.

== Biography ==
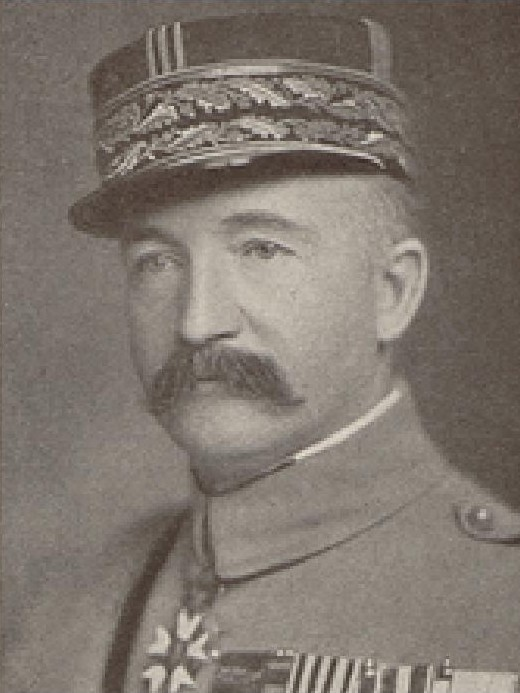

Mittelhauser graduated from the Saint-Cyr Military Academy in 1894 and joined the French Army. He served in the 2nd Rifle Regiment in Tunisia. From 1899 to 1901 he attended the École supérieure de guerre in Paris. Through the 1900s he served in Algeria and Morocco. In 1913 Mittelhauser commanded the 7th Battalion, 3rd Rifle Regiment. In 1915 he took command of the 60th Infantry Regiment. During World War I Mittelhauser was seriously wounded twice. In June 1918 he served as commander of the 36th Division. In February 1919 he was assigned to the French Military Mission to Czechoslovakia. From January 1921 to 30 December 1925 Mittelhauser was the chief of staff of Czechoslovak Army. In June 1940 he was appointed to command the French forces in Syria and Lebanon. Initially he joined British, but later he obeyed the orders of French government and joined the Vichy regime.

== Bibliography ==
- Generals of World War II

Military offices
Preceded by Maurice Pellé	Chief of the General Staff; 1921–1925	Succeeded by Jan Syrový
