= Vouziers =

- Subprefecture and commune
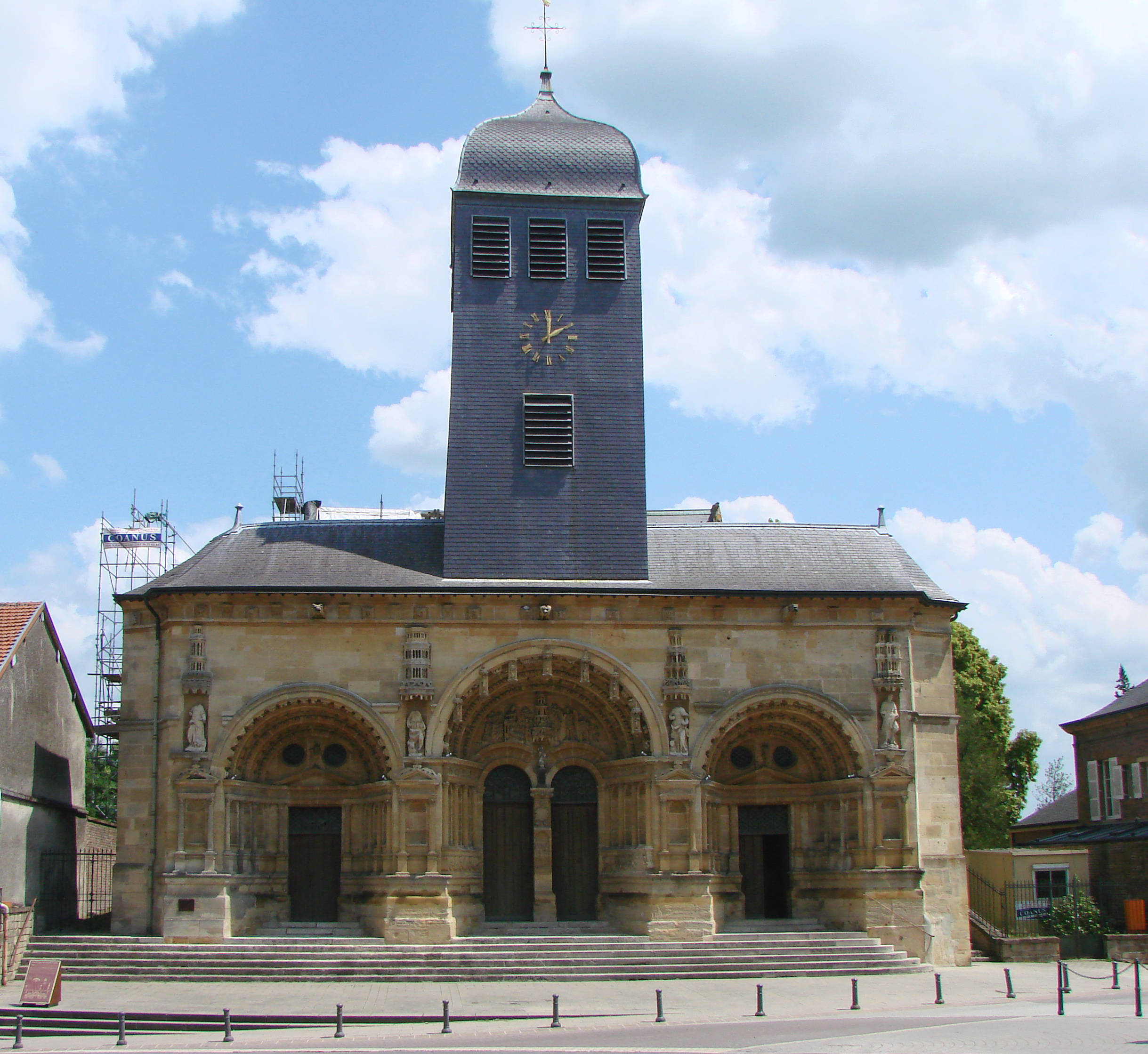
- Saint-Maurille

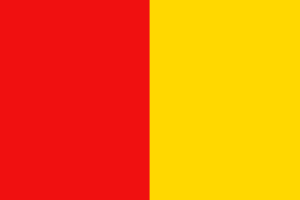
- Flag Coat of arms
- Location of Vouziers
- Location within France Location within Grand Est
- Coordinates: 49°23′50″N 4°41′54″E
- Country: France
- Region: Grand Est
- Department: Ardennes
- Arrondissement: Vouziers
- Canton: Vouziers
- Intercommunality: Argonne Ardennaise

Government
  - Mayor (2020–2026): Yann Dugard
- Area^{1}: 42.48 km^{2} (16.40 sq mi)
- Elevation: 148 m (486 ft)
- Highest elevation: 186 m (610 ft)
- Lowest elevation: 89 m (292 ft)
- Population (2023): 3,825
  - Density: 90.04/km^{2} (233.2/sq mi)
- Time zone: UTC+01:00 (CET)
  - Summer (DST): UTC+02:00 (CEST)
- INSEE/Postal code: 08490 /08400
- ^{1} French Land Register data, which excludes lakes, ponds, glaciers > 1 km^{2} (0.386 sq mi or 247 acres) and river estuaries.

Vouziers (French pronunciation: [vuzje]) is a commune of the Ardennes department, northern France.

Vouziers is the burial place of the pioneer First World War fighter pilot Roland Garros, after whom the Stade Roland Garros in Paris (the location of the French Open tennis tournament) is named. Tomáš Garrigue Masaryk (the first president of Czechoslovakia) fought at Vouziers with the Czechoslovak Legion in France; there is a monument to the legion, and the president's name given to the city lycee (high school). The cellist and conductor Jean Witkowski was born in Vouziers on 23 May 1895.

The town was on the path of totality for the Solar eclipse of 11 August 1999. It hosted a major observation event. Because of its proximity to the Belgian border, it was gridlocked by visiting Belgian cars on the morning of the eclipse.

== Geography ==
The river Aisne flows through Vouziers, doubled by a branch of the "canal des Ardennes".

The town lies between the Forest of Argonne, the pre-Ardennes, and Champagne, and near the Ardennes Massif (dense woodland). It is not far from Charleville-Mézières, Sedan (the largest medieval castle in Europe), Rocroi, Reims (where the kings of France were crowned), Châlons-en-Champagne, and Varennes-en-Argonne (where Louis XVI was arrested during the French Revolution). On 1 June 2016, the former communes Terron-sur-Aisne and Vrizy were merged into Vouziers.

== Population ==
The inhabitants are called Vouzinois in French. The population data in the table and graph below refer to the commune of Vouziers proper, in its geography at the given years. The commune of Vouziers absorbed the former commune of Condé-lès-Vouziers in 1961, Chestres in 1964, Blaise in 1972, and Terron-sur-Aisne and Vrizy in 2016.

Historical population

Year	Pop.	±% p.a.
1793	1,380	—
1800	1,535	+1.53%
1806	1,951	+4.08%
1821	1,988	+0.13%
1831	2,003	+0.08%
1836	2,101	+0.96%
1841	2,410	+2.78%
1846	2,771	+2.83%
1851	2,862	+0.65%
1866	3,073	+0.48%
1872	3,059	−0.08%
1876	3,458	+3.11%
1881	3,453	−0.03%
1886	3,737	+1.59%
1891	3,808	+0.38%
1896	3,669	−0.74%
1901	3,546	−0.68%
1906	3,436	−0.63%

Year	Pop.	±% p.a.
1911	3,591	+0.89%
1921	3,328	−0.76%
1926	3,475	+0.87%
1931	3,130	−2.07%
1936	3,314	+1.15%
1946	3,135	−0.55%
1954	3,423	+1.10%
1962	3,973	+1.88%
1968	4,569	+2.36%
1975	5,069	+1.49%
1982	4,953	−0.33%
1990	4,807	−0.37%
1999	4,742	−0.15%
2007	4,226	−1.43%
2012	4,046	−0.87%
2017	4,340	+1.41%
2023	3,825	−2.08%

Source: EHESS and INSEE (2007-2023)

== Twin towns – sister cities ==
Vouziers is twinned with:

- Agnam Civol, Senegal
- Gräfenroda, Germany
- Ratíškovice, Czech Republic

== See also ==
- Communes of the Ardennes department
