= Maurice Pellé =

French and Czechoslovak general

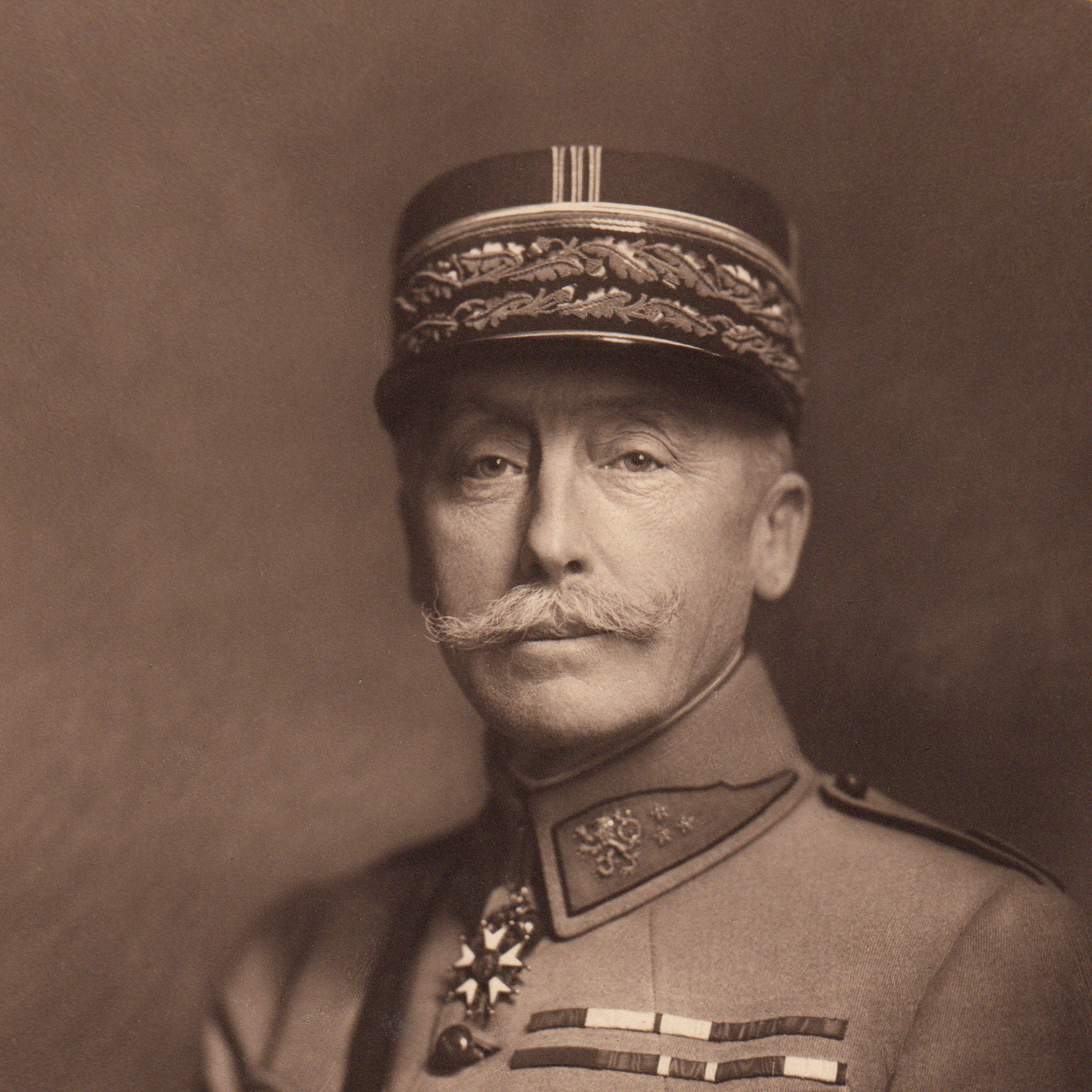
- Maurice Pellé (Prague, 1920)
- Born: 18 April 1863; Douai, Nord, France
- Died: 16 March 1924 (aged 60); Toulon, Var, France
- Relatives: Charles Henri Joseph Pellé (father); Céline Virginie Aimée Augustine Bruneau (mother)
- Military career
- Allegiance: France; Czechoslovakia
- Branch: (France) French Army (Czechoslovakia) Czechoslovak Army
- Service years: (France) 1882–1921 (Czechoslovakia) 1919–1921
- Rank: général de division
- Conflicts: World War I Czechoslovak-Hungary War

Maurice César Joseph Pellé (18 April 1863 – 16 March 1924) was a French général de division, leader of the French Military Mission to Czechoslovakia and first Chief of staff of Czechoslovak Army from February 1919 to January 1921.

== Early life and education ==
He was born on 18 April 1863 to Charles Henri Joseph Pellé, French artillery officer and later general, and his wife Céline Virginie Aimée Augustine Pellé (née Bruneau). He studied at Douai lycée, from October 1882 to July 1884 at École Polytechnique and to July 1885 at École d'application de l'artillerie. In 1888–1889 he studied at École d'application de Cavallerie.

== Military career ==
In September 1885 he was assigned to 12th Artillery Regiment as a platoon commander. In December 1888 he became an instructor at École d'application de l'artillerie. In November 1891 he was appointed to 11th Artillery Regiment as a first officer and in April 1892 to 16th Artillery Regiment as a deputy commander.

Between 1900 and 1903, he was chief of staff of Colonel Joffre in Madagascar. As a Colonel, Pellé was the French military attaché in Berlin, in the service of Ambassador Jules Cambon between 1909 and 1912. In this period he met many German personalities and became an expert on the German Empire. In 1913, he was transferred to Morocco, as chief of staff to General Hubert Lyautey.

At the outbreak of World War I, he commanded the 2nd Moroccan Brigade, but was right away called by Joffre to serve in the Bureau for External Theatres of War of the Grand Quartier Général. In December 1916 he was placed at the head of the 153rd Infantry Division with which he distinguished himself at the Second Battle of the Aisne. Promoted to Général de division on 2 May 1917, he took command of the 5th Army Corps (France) until January 1919. With this corps he participated in the German spring offensive and Hundred Days Offensive (Noyon, Marne and Argonne).

== Czechoslovakia and Constantinople ==
After the war he was leader of the French Military Mission to Czechoslovakia and one of the fathers and first Chief of staff of the new Czechoslovak Army.

In 1921, he became the French High Commissioner for the Orient and Ambassador in Constantinople. He signed the Armistice of Mudanya for France and was the leader of the French delegation at the Conference of Lausanne, which led to the Treaty of Lausanne signed on 24 July 1923, which defined the borders of the modern Turkish Republic.

He died the next year, only 60 years old. He is buried in the Batignolles Cemetery in Paris.

== Decorations ==
Awarded by Belgium:

Order of Leopold (Grand Officer)
Order of the Crown (Grand Officer)
Croix de guerre

Awarded by Czechoslovakia:

Order of the White Lion (Grand Cross)
War Cross 1918

Awarded by France:

Légion d'honneur (Grand Cross)
Croix de guerre 1914–1918 (thrice)
Ordre des Palmes Académiques (Officer)

Awarded by Italy:

Order of Saints Maurice and Lazarus (Grand Officer)

Awarded by Japan:

Order of the Rising Sun (2nd Class)

Awarded by Marocco:

Order of Ouissam Alaouite (2nd Class)

Awarded by Persia:

Order of the Lion and the Sun (1st Class)

Awarded by Romania:

Order of the Star of Romania (Grand Cross)

Awarded by Russia:

Order of St. Anna (1st Class)

Awarded by Serbia:

Order of the White Eagle (2nd Class)

Awarded by Spain:

Order of Military Merit (2nd Class)

Awarded by Tunisia:

Order of Glory (5th Class)

Awarded by United Kingdom:

Order of the Bath (Knight Commander)

Military offices
Preceded by Position established	Chief of the General Staff; 1919–1920	Succeeded by Eugène Mittelhauser
