= Hungarian–Czechoslovak War =

Armed conflict between Czechoslovakia and Hungary

- Part of the 1918–20 revolutions and interventions in Hungary
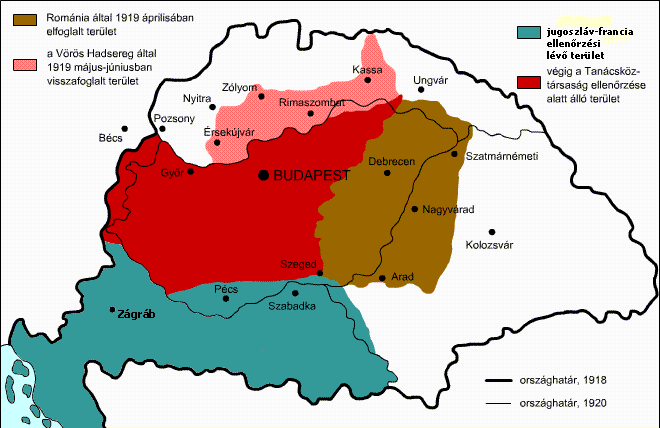
- Territory recovered by the Hungarian Soviet Republic (light red) in today Slovakia and minor parts in today Hungary, in May–June 1919
Date	November 1918 – August 1919
Location	present-day Slovakia, Carpathian Ruthenia, Hungary
Result	Czechoslovak victory
Territorial changes	Most of Upper Hungary falls under control of Czechoslovakia

Belligerents
Hungarian Republic (until March 21, 1919); Soviet Hungary (from March 21, 1919); Supported by: Soviet Russia	Czechoslovakia; Hungarian anti-communists Supported by: France; Romania; Italy

Commanders and leaders
(First Hungarian Republic) Mihály Károlyi; Béla Kun; Aurél Stromfeld; Ferenc Julier; Vilmos Böhm	(Czechoslovakia) Tomáš Masaryk (Czechoslovakia) František Schöbl (Czechoslovakia) Josef Štika (Czechoslovakia) Josef Šnejdárek (Czechoslovakia) Josef Votruba

Strength
80,000	20,000

Casualties and losses
450 killed (regular army only) (some sources talks about 1,000 – 1,500 being killed); 3,691 wounded 471 captured 6,977 sick	861 killed 2,830 wounded 343 captured 1,960 missing (in some sources counted as dead); 1,412 sick

The Hungarian–Czechoslovak War, also known as the War for Upper Hungary (Hungarian: Háború Felső-Magyarországért), was a military conflict between the Czechoslovakia and Hungary. It lasted from November 1918 to August 1919.

In 1919, the Hungarian Red Army launched a military operation against Czechoslovak forces, which is referred to in Hungary as the Northern Campaign (Hungarian: északi hadjárat).

== Background ==
At the end of 1918, the final year of World War I, the collapse of Austria-Hungary led to the declaration of independence of Czechoslovakia.

== Occupation of Upper Hungary ==
On 28 October 1918, the Czechoslovak Republic was proclaimed, but its borders remained unsettled for several months. Edvard Beneš sought to present the Paris Peace Conference with a fait accompli, and Czechoslovak forces attempted unsuccessfully to occupy the northern counties of Hungary in November 1918 without official permission. The future territory of Slovakia (then Upper Hungary), which had belonged to Hungary, was intended to form part of Czechoslovakia. Clashes began between Hungarian and Czechoslovak military units in early November 1918.

At the end of the month, the Entente drew a provisional demarcation line, which was presented to the Hungarian government on 23 December in the document known as the Vix Note. Czech legion units were ordered back from Italy and began occupying the southern, Hungarian-inhabited regions of Upper Hungary (the future Slovakia) on 31 December 1918, securing control before mid-January.

In December, French lieutenant colonel Ferdinand Vix, head of the Entente military mission in Budapest, informed the Hungarian government that the Czechoslovak Army was recognized as part of the Entente forces. He further stated that Slovakia was considered part of the Czechoslovak Republic, which therefore had the right to occupy the territory militarily, and that Hungary was required to withdraw its troops.

The predominantly Hungarian and German population sought to prevent the annexation of Pozsony (today Bratislava) to Czechoslovakia and declared it a free city. Nevertheless, the Czechoslovak Legions occupied the city on 1 January 1919 and incorporated it into Czechoslovakia, largely due to its economic importance. On 12 February 1919, German and Hungarian residents held a protest against the Czechoslovak occupation. Czechoslovak Legion units opened fire on the unarmed demonstrators, causing eight deaths and fourteen injuries.

Czechoslovak forces began occupying northern Hungary on 2 November 1918. A detachment of 120 men from Holíč advanced as far as Malacky. The Hungarian prefect in Bratislava dispatched several dozen soldiers against them, but they were unable to force a retreat. Tensions eased following the establishment of a temporary demarcation line from Devínska Nová Ves to the Little Carpathians, leaving Bratislava under Hungarian control. Under the agreement, Czechoslovak troops occupied the area from Stupava to Devín Lake. They took Trenčín on 10 November and Žilina two days later.

When 120 Czechoslovak soldiers occupied Trnava on 9 November, the local guard, supported by Hungarian troops from Bratislava, drove them back to Senica, where the Hungarian advance halted on 17 November. Czechoslovak forces approaching Ružomberok also retreated to Žilina and then, under Hungarian pressure, withdrew to Ostrava. The provisional border between Czechoslovakia and Hungary was fixed on 28 November along the river Ipeľ to Lučenac, then through Rimavská Sobota to Uzhhorod.

Colonel František Schöbl, who assumed command of Czechoslovak forces in northern Hungary on 25 November, decided to occupy the Nitra Valley on 6 December. However, on 4 December, he encountered a Hungarian attack on Hlohovec. A Czechoslovak naval company repulsed another attack at Žilina the next day and secured the town. After consolidating control over Hlohovec, Czechoslovak troops occupied Sereď and Pezinok. Nitra was taken on 11 December after the Hungarians withdrew to Nové Zámky.

A broader operation followed with the aim of securing central and eastern northern Hungary. Poprad was captured with the support of an armoured train on 15 December, and Spišská Nová Ves the next day. After a clash with Polish forces near Kežmarok, a demarcation line between Czechoslovakia and Poland was established from Lomnický štít through Magura to Stará Ľubovňa.

Zvolen fell on 22 December, followed by Banská Štiavnica and Banská Bystrica on 23 December. By 25 December, all of Považie and the area extending to Spišská Nová Ves were under Czechoslovak control. Only the eastern part of northern Hungary remained unsecured, and it was occupied by the end of the year. Prešov was taken on 28 December and Košice the next day.

On the same day, Italian general Luigi Piccione assumed command of Czechoslovak troops. The Czechoslovak legionary corps from Italy was tasked with occupying southern northern Hungary. Piccione began the advance toward Bratislava on 30 December and secured control of the city between 1 and 2 January 1919. Lučenec was captured on the night of 2–3 January, Nové Zámky on 9 January without resistance, and Komárno the next day. By 11 January, the northern bank of the Ipeľ had been cleared.

Because the demarcation line crossed the key east-bound railway, Piccione decided to advance further south. The southern bank of the Ipeľ was taken on 16 January, and by 20 January the entire territory of the future Slovakia was under Czechoslovak control. However, Czechoslovakia remained dissatisfied with the 28 November border, as the east-bound railway line remained partly on the Hungarian side. In February 1919, the Council of the Entente permitted Czechoslovak troops to occupy a more southerly line from Esztergom through the Mátra Mountains to Čop.

During the conflict, the Hungarian Red Army fought separate engagements against Czechoslovak and Romanian troops. France was heavily involved diplomatically. By the end of the war, more than 120,000 troops had taken part on both sides.

On 26 April 1919, Hungarian forces withdrew from the border areas with Czechoslovakia. Their retreat facilitated the Czechoslovak advance, and on 27 April Czechoslovak forces joined the Romanian army, following an order issued on 7 April. Their tasks included securing the new state’s territory and preventing a potential link between the Hungarian Red Army and Soviet Russia.

Part of the Czechoslovak forces advanced eastward, crossing the Carpathian passes and entering Transcarpathian Rus (today Subcarpathian Ukraine), which they secured by 30 April. Meanwhile, the southern advance proceeded rapidly. Troops under General Piccione moved beyond the newly drawn demarcation line and entered Miskolc on 2 May.

Romanian forces halted at the Tisza River on 1 May because Bessarabia, which Romania had taken over following the collapse of Tsarist Russia, came under threat. On 1 May, Soviet Foreign Minister Georgii Chicherin issued an ultimatum demanding Romania withdraw from Bessarabia or face attack. Romania agreed to a truce with Budapest on 2 May to consolidate its defenses. This development was exploited by Hungarian forces, who redirected their focus toward Czechoslovakia.

== Northern campaign ==
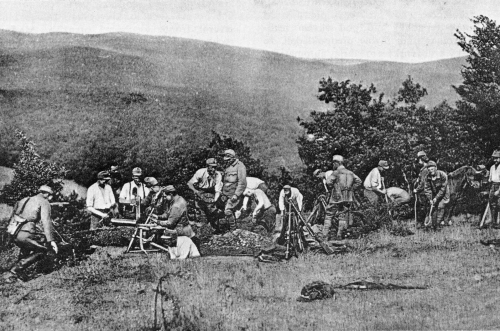
Czechoslovak soldiers fighting against the Hungarian Red Army, May 1919

=== Battle of Salgótarján and aftermath ===
Appealing to Hungarians with promises to regain the lands lost to neighbouring countries, communist leader Béla Kun declared war on Czechoslovakia shortly after coming to power. This increased his domestic support by suggesting he would restore Hungary's pre-war borders. The Hungarian Army began recruiting men aged 19–25, with industrial workers from Budapest volunteering and many former Austro-Hungarian officers re-enlisting out of patriotism. The army moved its 1st and 5th artillery divisions (40 battalions) to Upper Hungary (in present-day Slovakia).

The Hungarian counterattack was launched on 9 May 1919 in the area of Hatvan. On 20 May 1919, Colonel Aurél Stromfeld attacked in force and expelled Czechoslovak troops from Miskolc (Miškovec), also recapturing Košice (Kassa) and Prešov (Eperjes), successfully separating the Czechoslovak and Romanian armies from one another. As a result, Hungary controlled territory up to its former northern border and regained several industrial areas around Miskolc, Salgótarján and Banská Štiavnica (Selmecbánya).

Mass celebration of the "liberation of Kassa" (today Košice) by the Hungarian Red Army, 6 June 1919

The 1st Division, unable to cross the Hernád River because of strong Czechoslovak resistance, did not meet its objective. However, the rest of the corps advanced successfully. Particularly effective were the 80th and 46th brigades of the 3rd Division, which advanced toward Losonc (today Lučenec), prompting the enemy to evacuate the town on 30 May.

On 1 June, Hungarian troops captured Tiszalúc, Szendrő, Tornalja, and Léva (today Levice). By 3 June, they had entered Érsekújvár (today Nové Zámky). On 5 June, Hungarian soldiers marched into Sárospatak and Korpona (today Krupina). The 6th Division advanced toward Kassa (today Košice), capturing the city on 6 June. In the following days, III Corps continued its advance toward Tőketerebes (today Trebišov), Eperjes (today Prešov), and Bártfa (today Bardejov).

=== Proclamation of the Slovak Soviet Republic and collapse of morale ===
Despite earlier promises to restore Hungary's pre-war borders, the communist leadership proclaimed the independent Slovak Soviet Republic in Eperjes (today Prešov) on 16 June 1919. This convinced many Hungarian nationalists and patriots that the communist government's priority was spreading communist ideology rather than restoring lost Hungarian territories.

Despite a series of military victories, the Hungarian Red Army began to disintegrate because of this tension between nationalists and communists. Even the Chief of the General Staff, Aurél Stromfeld, resigned in protest.

On 7 June, French Prime Minister Georges Clemenceau sent a note urging an immediate ceasefire. The Hungarian Soviet government responded that hostilities were initiated by Czechoslovakia, which had crossed the demarcation line.

On 13 June, Clemenceau sent another note outlining the Peace Conference's proposed borders for Hungary, ordering a withdrawal within those boundaries. In response, a debate emerged within the Hungarian leadership over whether to accept or reject the terms. The subsequent withdrawal from northern territories caused the collapse of the Tisza front, contributing to the fall of the Hungarian Soviet Republic. On 4 August, Romanian forces entered Budapest.

Meanwhile, the Czechoslovak Army was reorganized. Unreliable Italian commanders were replaced by French officers. The newly reorganized 2nd Infantry Division, led by Foreign Legion veteran Josef Šnejdárek, regrouped and prepared for offensive operations. Within a week, Šnejdárek had stabilized his forces and readied them for battle.

On 24 June, following multiple exchanges between the Red Army High Command and General Pellé of the Czechoslovak side, a ceasefire came into effect on the northern front, marking the end of the Red Army's northern campaign.

=== Battle of Zvolen (Zólyom) ===
On the morning of 10 June, the 2nd Infantry Brigade launched a diversionary attack on Zvolen (Zólyom). Its left wing unexpectedly struck the flank of Hungarian forces while the right wing entered Banská Štiavnica (Selmecbánya). Hungarian counterattacks on the following day were repelled, and the 2nd Division continued its offensive.

Šnejdárek redirected the main attack and on 13 June ordered a flanking manoeuvre around Zvolen. After four hours of fighting, Czechoslovak troops occupied the dominant heights and began pressing the key Hungarian defensive positions. By midday, the frontline had shifted by about 10 km. Control of the central stretch of the Hron (Garam) River passed to Czechoslovakia, and the Hungarian command no longer had reserves to stabilize the front.

The recapture of Zvolen marked a turning point. The Czechoslovak Army seized the initiative and advanced toward Levice (Léva) and Lučenec (Losonc). A week of heavy fighting ensued, exhausting Hungarian forces. The Hungarian command agreed to a ceasefire and withdrew to the demarcation line.

Czech soldiers—many of whom had fought in the Austro-Hungarian Army during World War I—and Slovak volunteers demonstrated combat effectiveness comparable to that of the Czechoslovak Legions, who were still in Russia in 1919.

== Renewed conflict ==
In August 1919, the Bolshevik regime in Hungary collapsed, and Romanian forces occupied central parts of the country, including the capital. Czechoslovakia also took advantage of the situation. Although an offer to participate in the occupation of Budapest was rejected, Czechoslovak troops captured Petržalka and Salgótarján on 14 August. While they later withdrew from Salgótarján, Petržalka became part of Bratislava. Transcarpathia was occupied in September 1919.

== Aftermath ==
The defeat of the Hungarian Soviet Republic and the Slovak Soviet Republic, along with the Romanian occupation of Budapest in August 1919, brought the conflict to an end. Romanian troops withdrew from the occupied territory in March 1920. As a result of the war, Czechoslovakia gained control over the territory of Slovakia, which had previously been part of Hungary.

In the final phase of the conflict, more than 120,000 soldiers were deployed on both sides. Volunteers enlisted in the Czechoslovak Army, and several Slovak volunteer units were formed in Slovakia, including Jánošík's troupe, the Zbor Turčianských dobrovoľníkov, the Dobrovoľnícka družina Slovákov, and the Tisovskí dobrovoľníci.

Slovak volunteers were drawn mainly from the northern Slovak counties and took part primarily in the battles for Zvolen, Banská Bystrica, and Košice. According to historian Zdeněk Kárník, 90 fallen Czechoslovak soldiers came from Slovakia and Subcarpathian Rus, while 895 fallen soldiers—including 640 volunteers—came from the Czech lands.

== Sources ==
- Lacika, Ján (2000). Bratislava. Visiting Slovakia (1st ed.). Bratislava, Slovakia: DAJAMA. ISBN 80-88975-16-6.
- Simon, Attila (2011). "I. Changes of Sovereignty and the New Nation States in the Danube Region 1918–1921 – 3. The Creation of Hungarian Minority Groups – Czechoslovakia: Slovakia". In Bárdi, Nándor; Szarka, Csilla; Szarka, László (eds.). Minority Hungarian Communities in the Twentieth Century (East European Monographs, 774). Translated by McLean, Brian; Suff, Matthew. New York: Columbia University Press, Atlantic Research and Publications, Inc., Institute for Ethnic and National Minority Studies of the Hungarian Academy of Sciences. ISBN 978-0-88033-677-2.
