= Czechoslovak Legion in France =

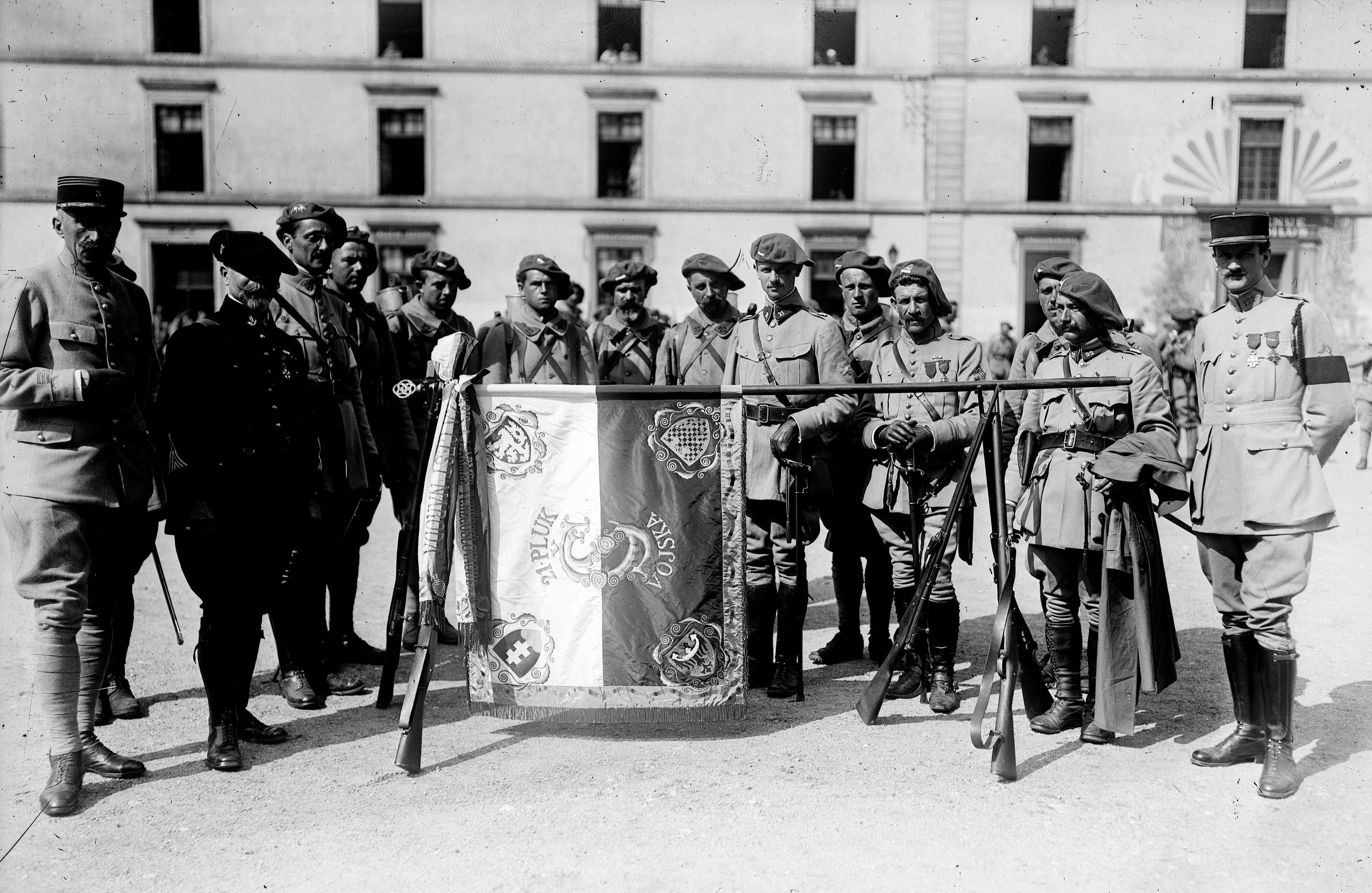
Czechoslovak Legions in France

Enrollment of Czechoslovak volunteers in the French Foreign Legion started in Paris on 21 August 1914. The 1st Company, Battalion C, of the 2nd Infantry Regiment of the Foreign Legion, was created in Bayonne on 31 August. Meeting in the city, the soldiers greeted each other with "Na zdar!" (a greeting used by members of the Sokol movement) and hence came to be called "Nazdar!" Company ("rota Nazdar" in Czech). The company was part of the French army's Moroccan division, and took part in heavy combat during assaults near Arras on 9 May and 16 June 1915, where it suffered heavy casualties. Because of these, Battalion C, including "Nazdar!" Company, was disbanded, and volunteers continued to fight in various French army and Foreign Legion units.

Clemenceau and Masaryk suggested transportation of T. G. Masaryk legions from Russia to France of s. c. "North trip" (by North sea) as first (the first realization 15 October 1917 from Archangelsk).

An autonomous Czechoslovak army was established from 19 December 1917 by decree of the French government. On 12 January 1918 the 21st Czechoslovak Rifle Regiment was formed in the town of Cognac. It fought as part of the French 53rd Infantry Division. On 20 May 1918 the 22nd Czechoslovak Rifle Regiment was created, initially fighting as part of the French 134th Infantry Division. On 29 June the government of France officially acknowledged the right of Czechs and Slovaks to independence, and the next day both regiments took an oath of allegiance in presence of the French president, Raymond Poincaré, as well as Czechoslovak independence movement officials, including Edvard Beneš. Today, 30 June is celebrated as the "Day of Czech Armed Forces".

In 1918 a Czechoslovak brigade, under command of the French general Philippe, consisting of the 21st and 22nd Rifle regiments, was formed in France, and saw combat near Vouziers. The brigade returned home in the autumn of 1918. It had about 9,600 soldiers.

The Czechoslovak Legion was honored in the painting the "Panthéon de la Guerre" by the inclusion of its flag.

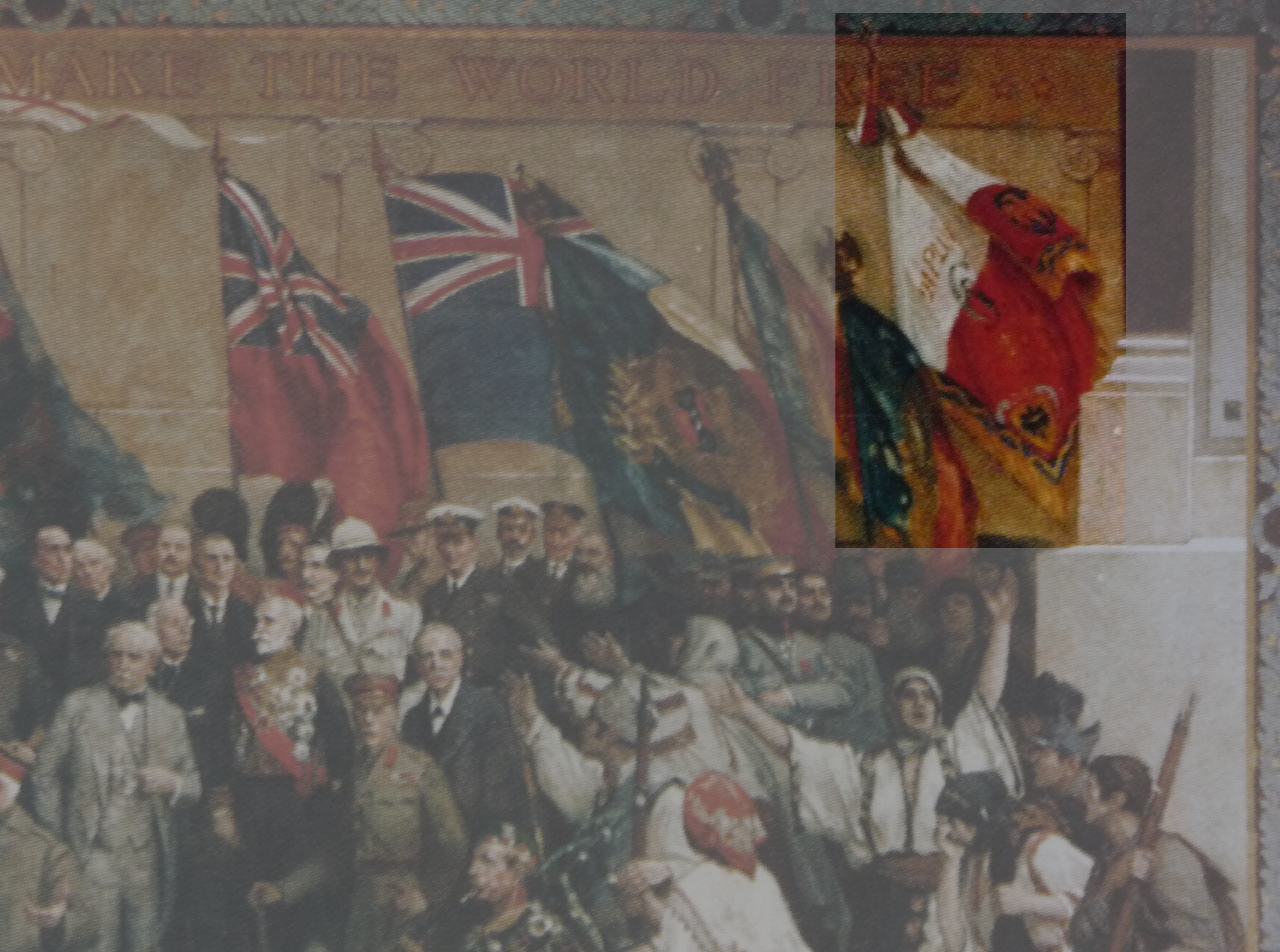
Flag of the Czechoslovak Legion in the Panthéon de la Guerre.

650 Czech and Slovak legionnaires died in France during World War I.

== See also ==
- Czechoslovak Legion in Italy
- Czechoslovak Legion
