= Legiobanka =

Former bank in Czechoslovakia

Head office building in Prague

The Bank of the Czechoslovak Legions (Czech: Banka československých legií), generally referred to as Legiobanka, was a cooperative bank in interwar Czechoslovakia. It was founded in Irkutsk in 1919 to serve the financial needs of the Czechoslovak Legion and prospered in subsequent years thanks to its strong patriotic associations. Under Nazi occupation during World War II, it was renamed Czecho-Moravian Bank in Prague (Czech: Českomoravská banka v Praze) between 1940 and 1945. It was eventually nationalized and absorbed by Živnostenská Banka in 1948.

Its head office building in Prague, designed by Josef Gočár, is so representative of the particular Czechoslovak version of art deco architecture known as rondocubism that the latter is sometimes referred to as Legiobanka style (sometimes "Legiobank style").

== Overview ==
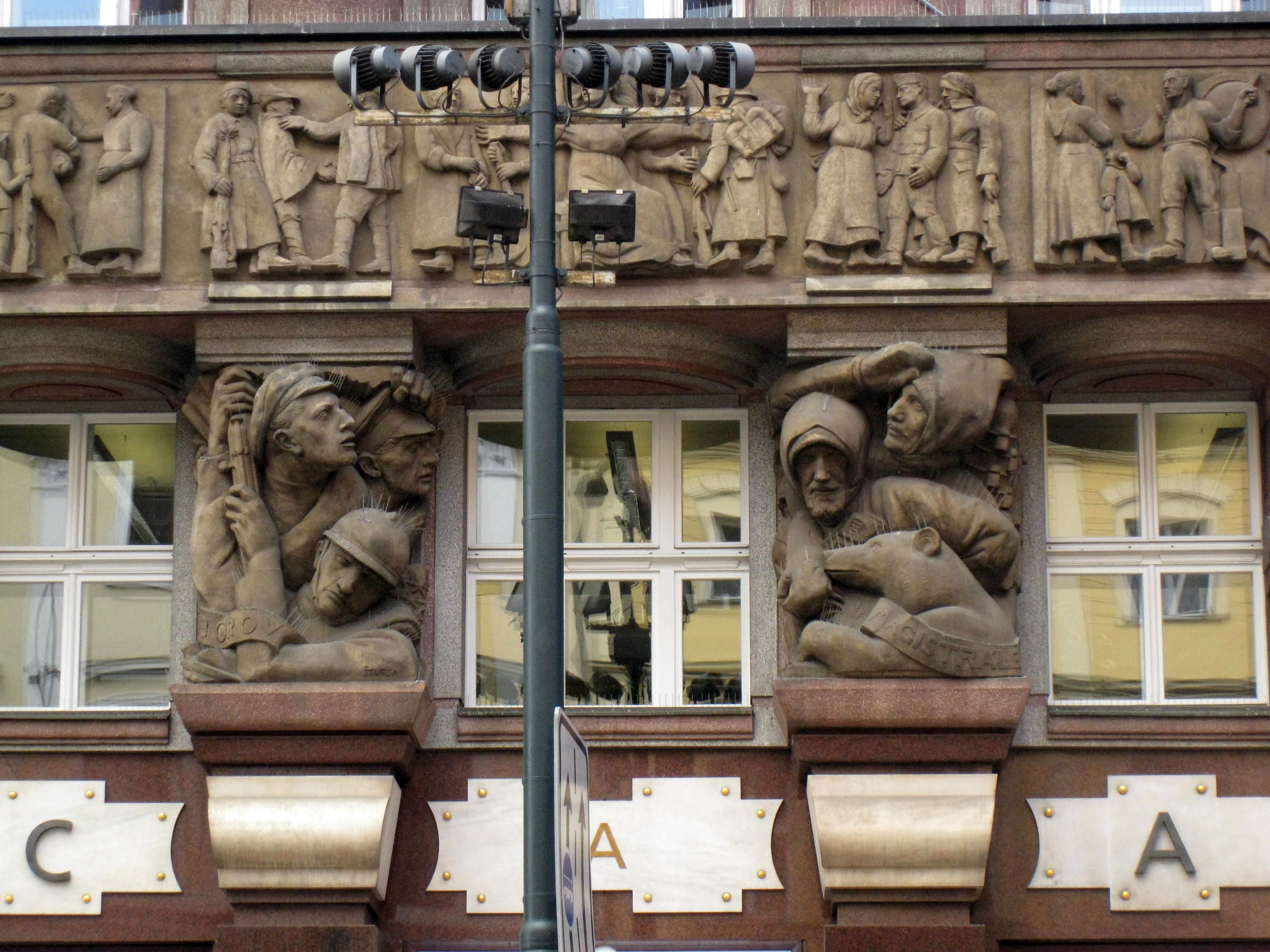
Exterior sculpture

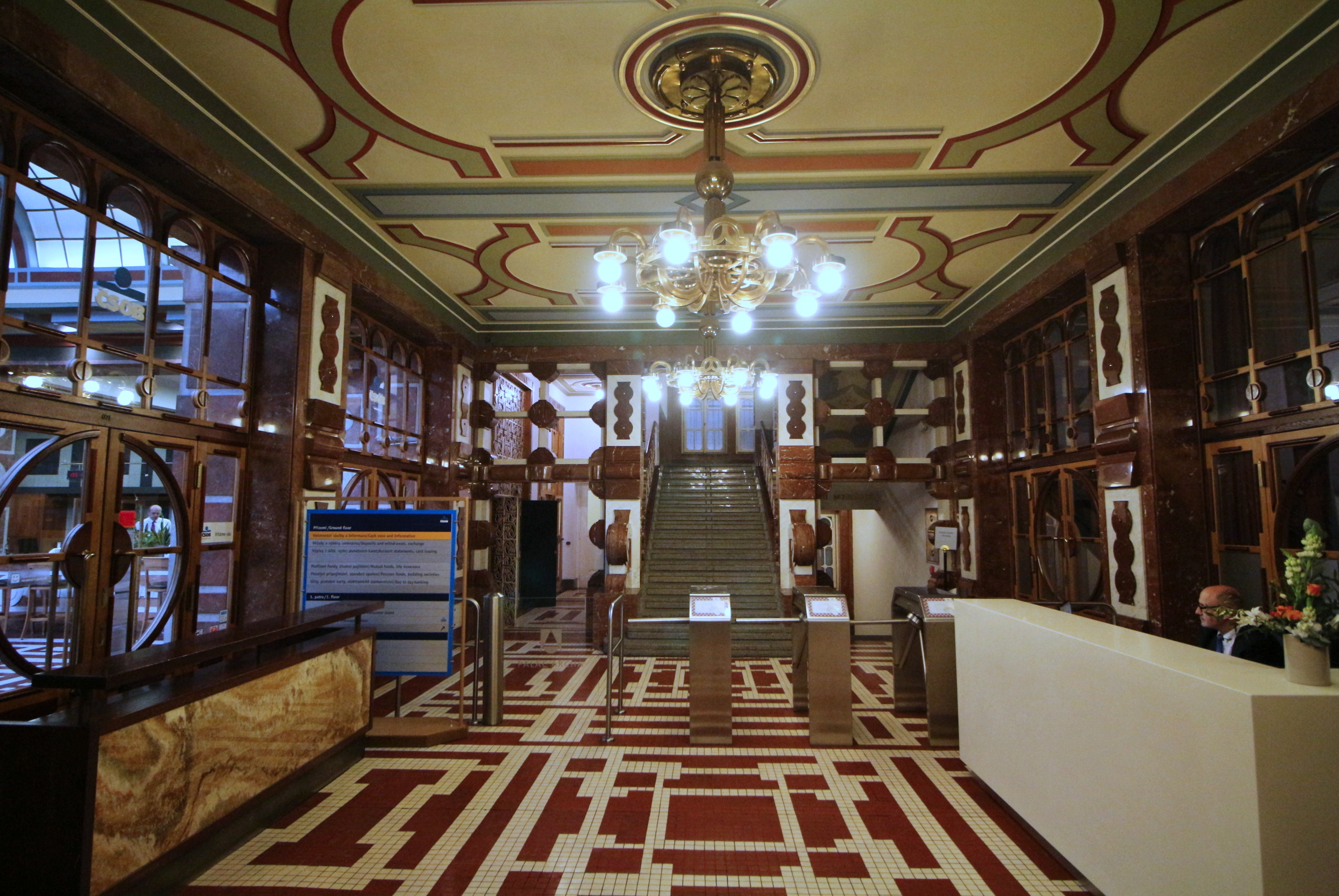
Entrance lobby

The creation of the bank, in Irkutsk in the autumn of 1919, was preceded by that of the Military Savings Bank (Czech: Vojenská spořitelna a year before. A key figure for the establishment of both institutions was František Šíp, a legionnaire officer responsible for the logistics and financing of the approximately forty thousand-strong legionary army in Russia. Šíp logically became the bank's first general manager. The bank maintained its activity throughout the interwar period. In addition to its head office, it had four local branch offices in Prague and 17 local branches in the rest of the country, in Berehovo, Bratislava, Brno, Duchcov, Hradec Králové, Jihlava, Kolín, Louny, Lovosice, Ostrava, Nové Mesto nad Váhom, Olomouc, Piešťany, Plzeň, Poprad, Turnov, and Zvolen.

During the presidency of Tomáš Masaryk in the 1920s and 1930s, the bank was associated with the political group around him known as the Hrad (lit. 'the castle'). In the late 1930s, its building was also the seat of the Party of National Unity.

In 1940, the occupation authorities ordered the bank to rename itself as Czecho-Moravian Bank in Prague. In 1943, it was designated for merger with Kreditanstalt der Deutschen, a cooperative bank of the German community in Prague that had been established in 1911, but that plan was not carried out. The Legiobanka was re-established under its former name in July 1945, shortly after liberation, and nationalized in October 1945 under Decree No. 102/45. In 1948, the Communist authorities forcibly merged it into Živnostenská Banka, which itself was absorbed in 1950 into the State Bank of Czechoslovakia.

== Head office ==
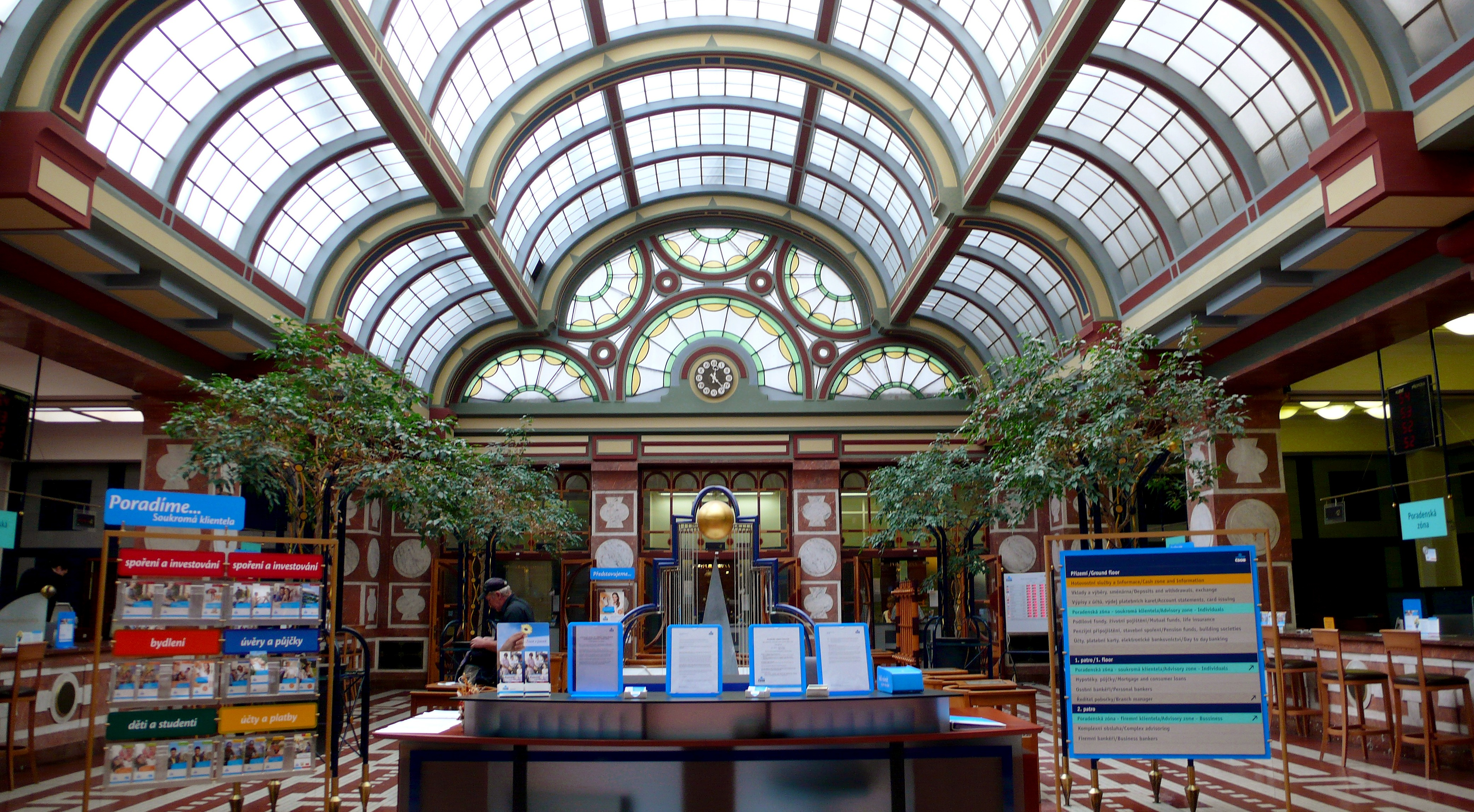
Banking hall

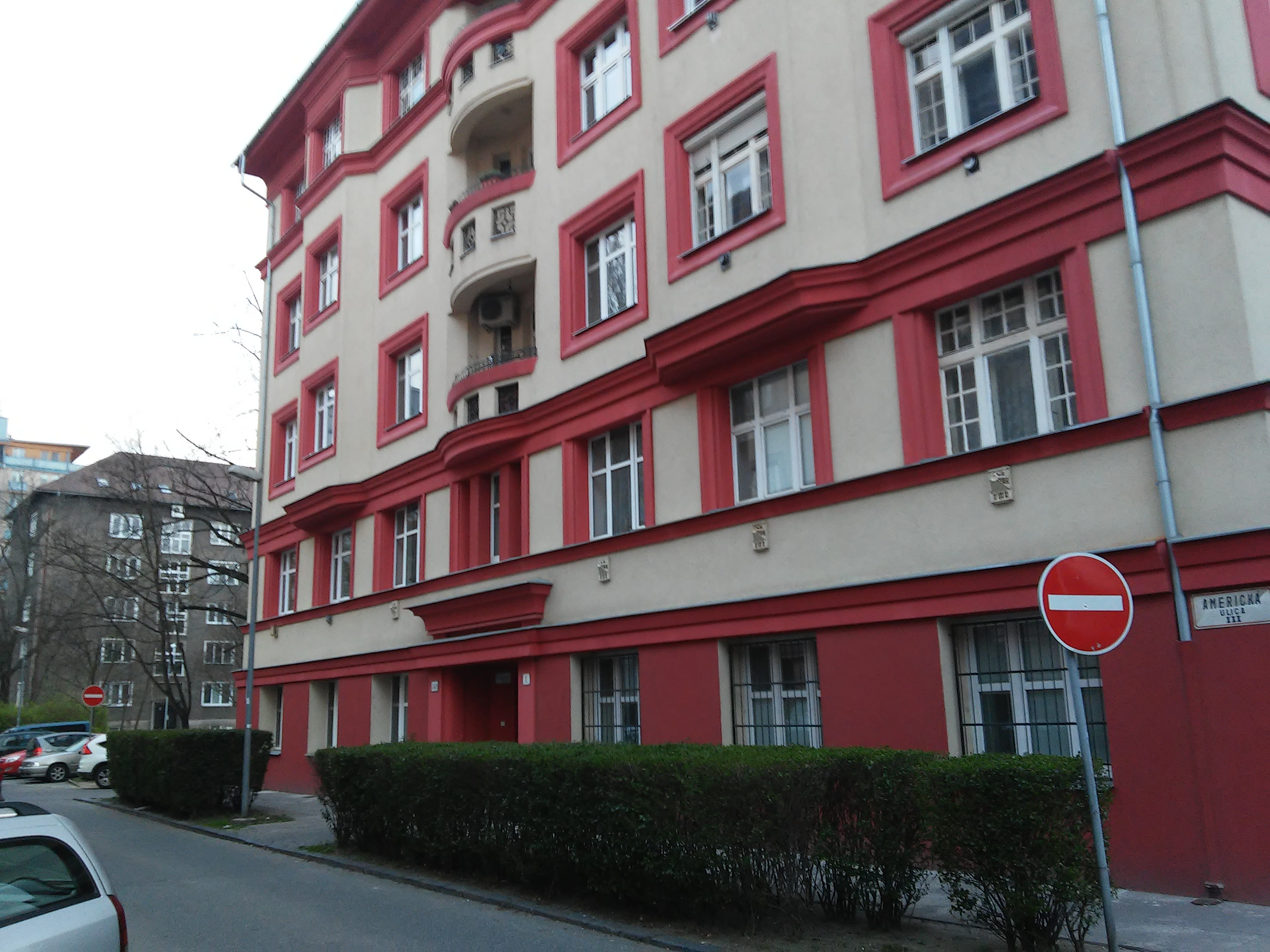
Branch in Bratislava, designed by Dušan Jurkovič

The bank was initially located in Prague's Štefánik barracks and then in the hotel U Saského dvora. In 1923, it moved into its own new head office building designed by architect Josef Gočár in 1921. It displays four figurative representations by sculptor Jan Štursa of the Legion's fighting, respectively on the Italian front (battles of Doss'Alto and the Piave), Eastern Front (Zborov), Russian Far East (the revolt of the Czechoslovak Legion on the Trans-Siberian Railway, known in Czech as the Magistrále), and Western Front (Vouziers and the Terron). Above these is a frieze depicting the return of the Legions, by Otto Gutfreund. Visual artist František Kysela led the interior design.

In 1922, Legiobanka purchased the adjacent building at Na Poříčí 26, and in 1937–1938 had it rebuilt on a design by František Marek to host various facilities including the avant-garde D 34 Theatre led by Emil František Burian. The theatre was revived from 1960 to 1991 as the E. F. Burian Theatre.

The building was purchased in 1990 by ČSOB, which had it renovated in 1991–1994 and keeps a branch at the street level. In 1994, the theatre was revived again as Archa Theatre, after which the entire building is also known as the Archa Palace (Czech: Palác Archa).

== See also ==
- National Bank of Czechoslovakia
- List of banks in the Czech Republic
