= Czechoslovak Legion =

WWI and Russian Civil War unit (1914–1920)

- Czech: československé legie; Slovak: československé légie
- Czechoslovak Legion coat of arms
- Founded: 1914
- Disbanded: 1920
- Allegiance: Czechoslovakia
- Type: Ground forces; Expeditionary warfare
- Size: 71,310 in Russia; 19,476 in Italy; 9,957 in France; 46,871 Others; Total: 145,614
- Motto: "Nazdar" (meaning "Hello" or "Goodbye")
- Colors
- Equipment: Armored Zaamurets
- Engagements: World War I; Eastern Front; Battle of Zboriv; Italian Front; Isonzo front; Second Battle of the Piave River; Battle of Doss Alto; Western Front; Battle of Arras (1915); Battle of the Terron; Russian Civil War; Operation Faustschlag; Battle of Bakhmach; Revolt of the Czechoslovak Legion

Commanders
- Notable commanders: Milan Rastislav Štefánik; Radola Gajda; Jan Syrový; Stanislav Čeček; Josef Šnejdárek

Insignia
- Universal Battle flag
- Leaders: Czechoslovak National Council; (Tomáš Masaryk, Milan Rastislav Štefánik, and Edvard Beneš)
- Merged into: Czechoslovak Army
- Part of: World War I: French Armed Forces; French Foreign Legion "Nazdar!" Company (until 16 June 1915); Autonomous Czechoslovak Army (after 19 December 1917); Imperial Russian Army (1914–1917); Royal Italian Army (1914–1918); Czechoslovak Italian Legion (1918); Russian Civil War: White Army; Siberian Army

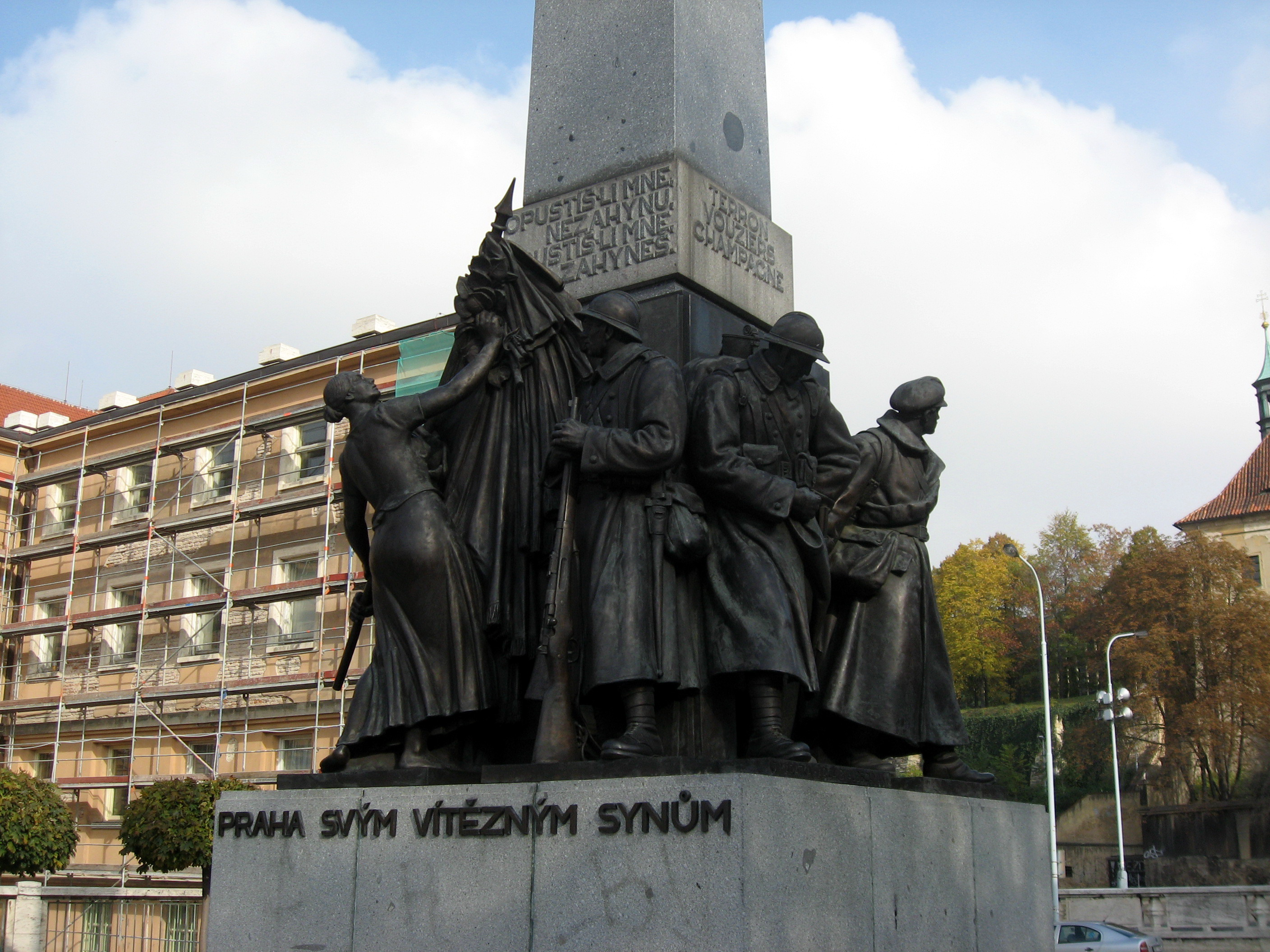
"Prague to Its Victorious Sons", a monument to the Czechoslovak Legions at Palacký Square

The Czechoslovak Legion (Czech: československé legie; Slovak: československé légie) were volunteer armed forces consisting predominantly of Czechs and Slovaks fighting on the side of the Entente powers during World War I and the White Army during the Russian Civil War until November 1919. Their goal was to win the support of the Allied Powers for the independence of the Lands of the Bohemian Crown from the Austrian Empire, and of Upper Hungary from the Kingdom of Hungary, which were then part of the Austro-Hungarian Empire. With the help of émigré intellectuals and politicians such as the Czech Tomáš Garrigue Masaryk and the Slovak Milan Rastislav Štefánik, they grew into a force of over 100,000 troops.

In Russia, they took part in several victorious battles during the Russian Civil war, including the battles of Zborov and Bakhmach against the Central Powers, and were heavily involved in the Russian Civil War fighting Bolsheviks, at times controlling the entire Trans-Siberian railway and several major cities in Siberia.

After three years of existence as a small unit in the Imperial Russian Army, the Legion in Russia was established in 1917, with other troops fighting in France since the beginning of the war as the "Nazdar" company, and similar units later emerging in Italy and Serbia. Originally an all-volunteer force, these formations were later strengthened by Czech and Slovak prisoners of war or deserters from the Austro-Hungarian Army. The majority of the legionaries were Czechs, with Slovaks making up 7% of the force in Russia, 3% in Italy and 16% in France.

The name Czechoslovak Legion preceded and anticipated the creation of Czechoslovakia.

== Involvement in World War I ==
=== In Russia ===
In the first months of World War I, the response of the Czech soldiers and civilians to the war and mobilization efforts were highly enthusiastic; however, it turned into apathy later. As World War I broke out, national societies representing ethnic Czechs and Slovaks residing in the Russian Empire petitioned the Russian government to support the independence of their homelands. To prove their loyalty to the Entente cause, these groups advocated the establishment of a unit of Czech and Slovak volunteers to fight alongside the Russian Army.

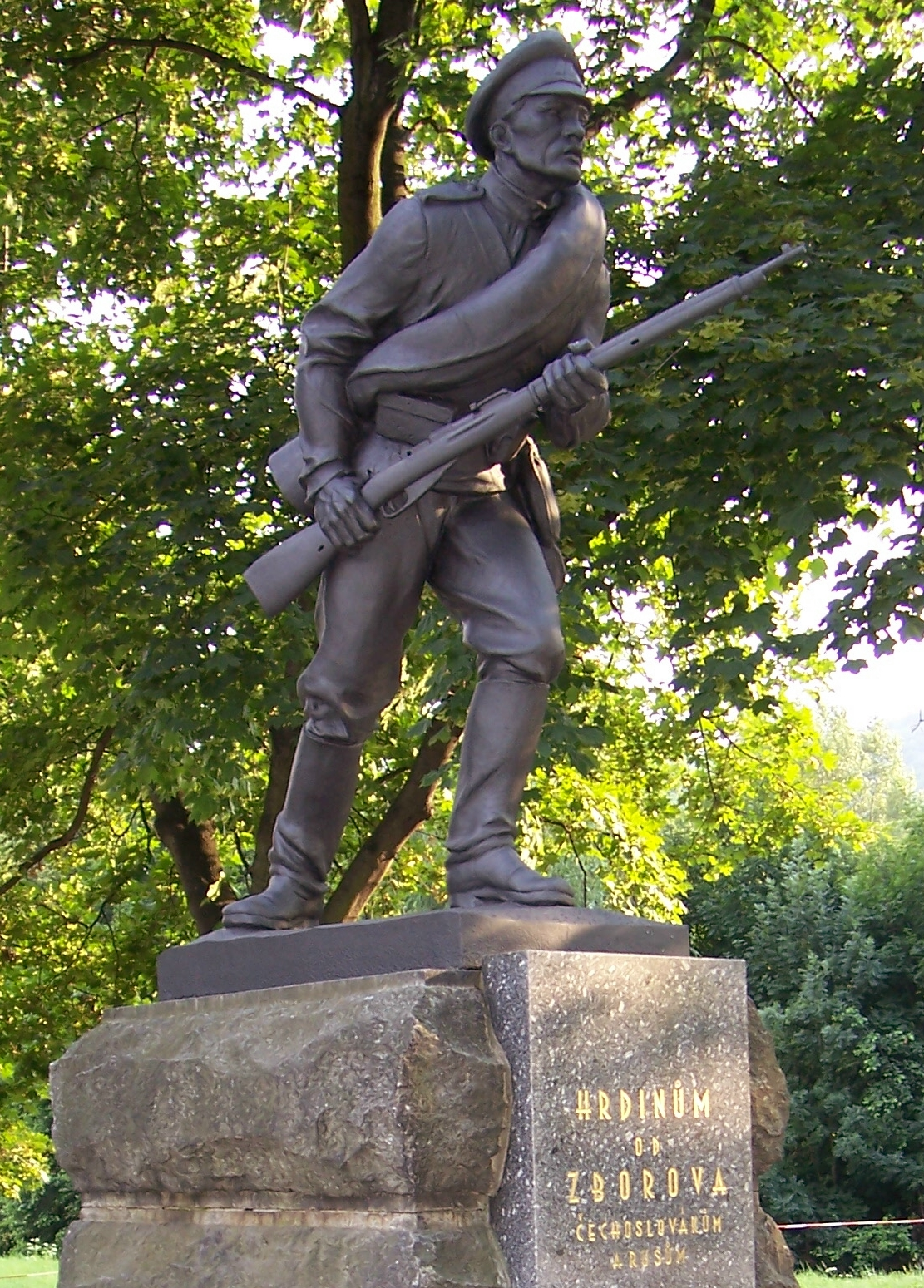
Memorial to the Czechoslovaks in the battle of Zborov at Blansko, Czech Republic

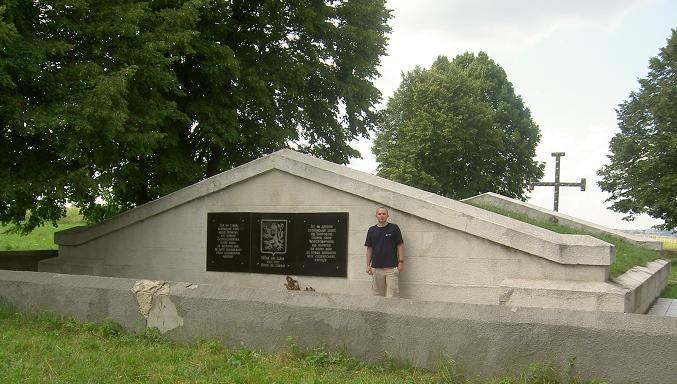
Memorial for the dead of the Czechoslovak Legion in the battle of Zborov (1917) at the Kalinivka cemetery, Ukraine

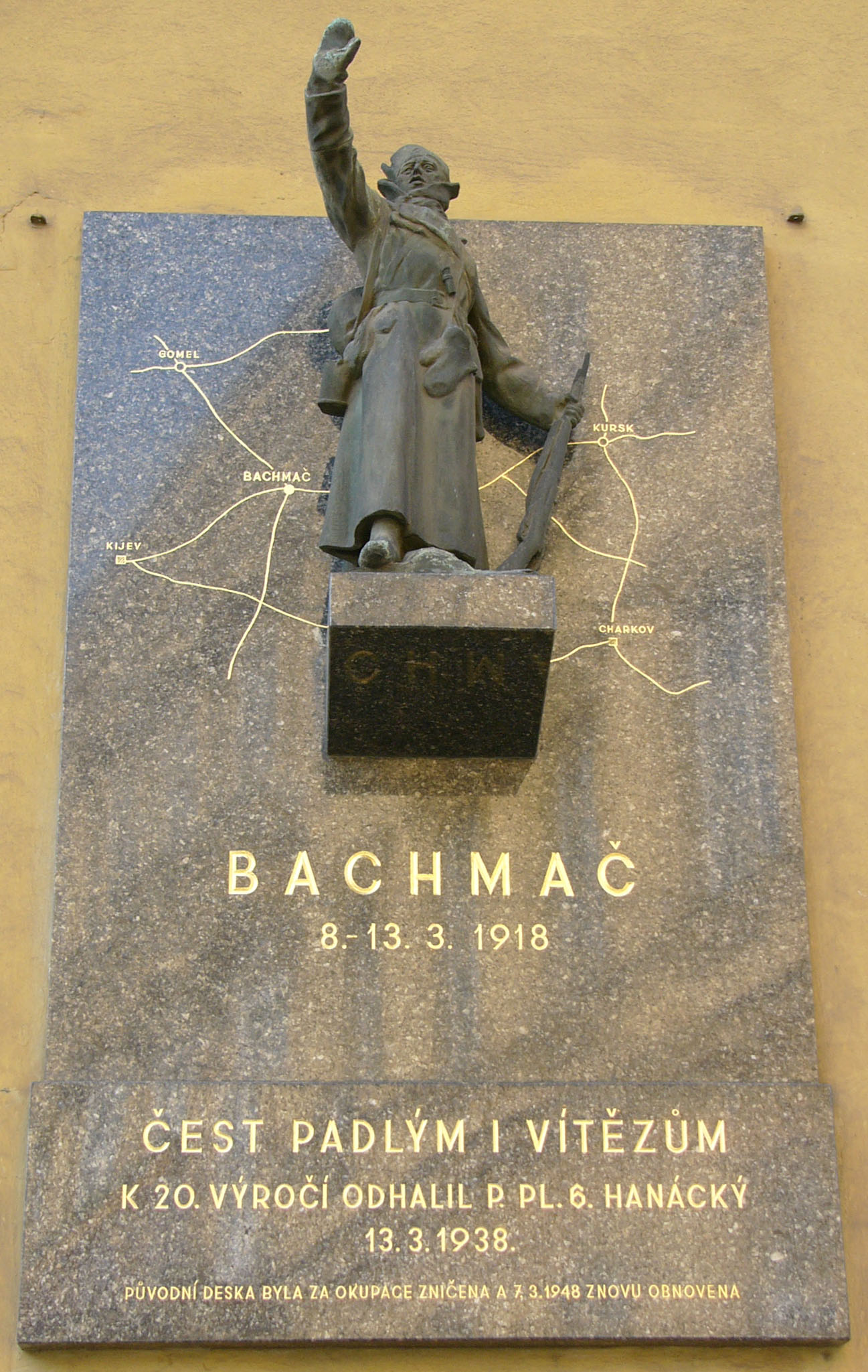
A memorial plaque to the Battle of Bakhmach in Olomouc

On 5 August 1914, the Russian Stavka authorized the formation of a battalion recruited from Czechs and Slovaks in Russia. This unit, called the "Czech Detachment" (Czech: Česká Družina), went to the front in October 1914, where it was attached to the Russian Third Army. There the Družina soldiers served in scattered patrols performing a number of specialized duties, including reconnaissance, prisoner interrogation and subversion of enemy troops in the opposite trenches.

From its start, Czech and Slovak political émigrés in Russia and Western Europe desired to expand the Družina from a battalion into a formidable military formation. To achieve this goal, they recognized that they would need to recruit from Czech and Slovak prisoners of war (POWs) in Russian camps. In late 1914, Russian military authorities permitted the Družina to enlist Czech and Slovak POWs from the Austro-Hungarian Army, but this order was rescinded after only a few weeks due to opposition from other branches of the Russian government. Despite continuous efforts of émigré leaders to persuade the Russian authorities to change their mind, the Czechs and Slovaks were officially barred from recruiting POWs until the summer of 1917. Still, some Czechs and Slovaks were able to sidestep this ban by enlisting POWs through local agreements with Russian military authorities.

Under these conditions, the Czechoslovak unit in Russia grew very slowly from 1914 to 1917. In early 1916, the Družina was reorganized as the 1st Czecho-Slovak Rifle Regiment. During that year, two more infantry regiments were added, creating the Czechoslovak Rifle Brigade (Československá střelecká brigáda). This unit distinguished itself during the Kerensky Offensive in July 1917, when the Czecho-Slovak troops overran Austrian trenches during the Battle of Zborov.

Following the soldiers' stellar performance at Zborov, the Russian Provisional Government finally granted their émigré leaders on the Czechoslovak National Council permission to mobilize Czech, Moravian and Slovak volunteers from the POW camps. Later that summer, a fourth regiment was added to the brigade, which was renamed the 1st Division of the Czechoslovak Corps in Russia (Československý sbor na Rusi), also known as the Czechoslovak Legion (Československá legie) in Russia. A second division, consisting of four regiments, was added to the Legion in October 1917, raising its strength to about 40,000 troops by 1918.

=== In France ===
In France, the Czechs and the Slovaks who wanted to fight Austria-Hungary were allowed to join the Foreign Legion, hence originated the term Legion for units of Czechoslovak volunteers. On 31 August 1914, the 1st Company of the 2nd Infantry Regiment of the Foreign Legion in Bayonne was created mostly of the Czechs and was nicknamed "rota Nazdar" ("Nazdar!" Company). The company distinguished itself in heavy combat during assaults near Arras on May 9 and June 16, 1915. Because of heavy casualties, the company was disbanded, and volunteers continued to fight in various French units.

New autonomous Czechoslovak units were established by the decree of the French government on 19 December 1917. In January 1918, the 21st Czechoslovak Rifle Regiment was formed in the town of Cognac; it mixed prisoners of war with volunteers living in America. The 22nd Czechoslovak Rifle Regiment was created later in May.

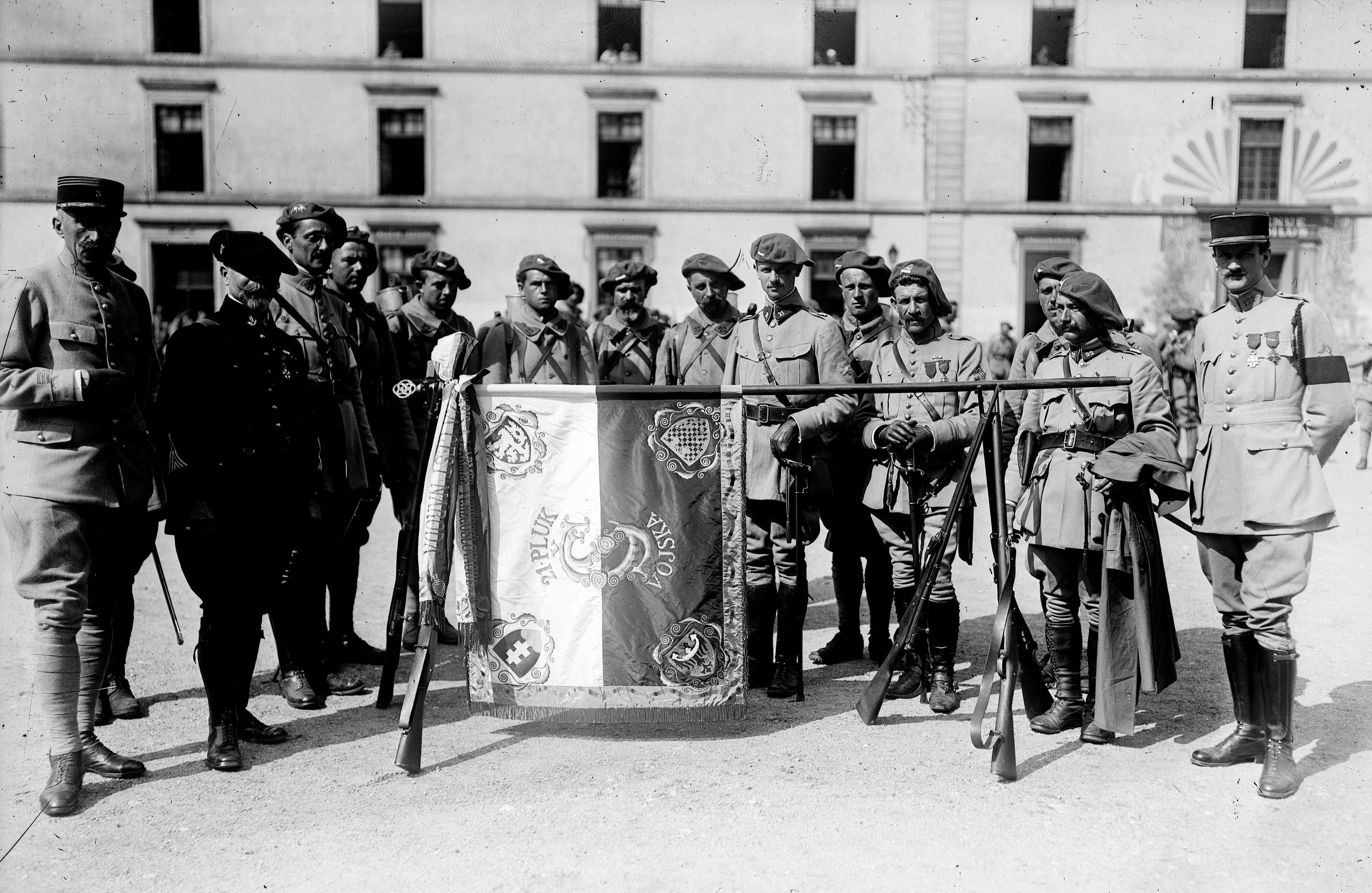
Czechoslovak Legions in France

=== In Italy ===
The creation of Czechoslovak units in Italy took place much later than in France or Russia. In January 1918, the commander of the Italian 6th Army decided to form small reconnaissance groups from Czech, Moravian Slovak and Southern Slav volunteers from prisoner-of-war camps. They also served in propaganda actions against the Austrian army. In September 1918 the first fighting unit, the 39th Regiment of the Czechoslovak Italian Legion, was formed from those volunteer reconnaissance squadrons.

Czechoslovak legionaries in Italy were the first to return to newly created Czechoslovakia in 1918 and were immediately drafted into fights for new state borders, most notably in the war against the Hungarian Soviet Republic.

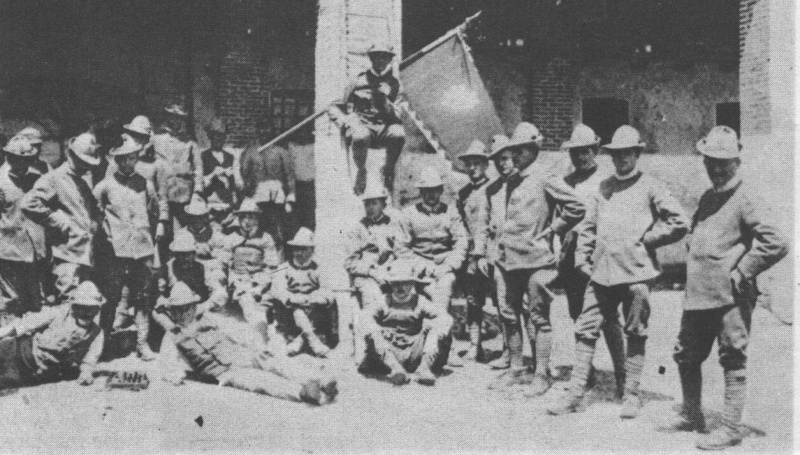
Czechoslovak Legions in Italy

=== Table of units involved in World War I ===
Czechoslovak Legion
France	Italy	Russian Empire
(French Third Republic) French Army: French Foreign Legion; Moroccan Division; 1st Company, Battalion C, of the 2nd Foreign Infantry Regiment; (French Third Republic) 53rd Infantry Division; 21st Czechoslovak Rifle Regiment; (French Third Republic) 134th Infantry Division; 22nd Czechoslovak Rifle Regiment	(Kingdom of Italy) Royal Italian Army: (Kingdom of Italy) 6th Army; Esploratori Cecoslovacchi; (Kingdom of Italy) 6th Division Czechoslovak (Czechoslovakia); Czechoslovak Italian Legion VI. Division and VII. Division; 31st Regiment; 32nd Regiment; 33rd Regiment; 34th Regiment; 35th Regiment	Imperial Russian Army: Russian Third Army; (Czechoslovakia) "Companions" (Družina); (Czechoslovakia) Czechoslovak Rifle Brigade; 1st Czecho-Slovak Rifle Regiment; 2nd Czecho-Slovak Rifle Regiment; 3rd Czecho-Slovak Rifle Regiment; (Czechoslovakia) 1st Division of the Czechoslovak Corps in Russia; 1st "Jan Hus" Infantry Regiment; 2nd "George of Poděbrady" Infantry Regiment; 3rd Infantry "Jan Žižka from Trocnów" Regiment; 4th Infantry "Prokop Grand" Regiment; (Czechoslovakia) 2nd Infantry Division; 5th Infantry Regiment of "Tomáš Masaryk" Prague; 6th Hanack Infantry Regiment; 7th Tatra Rifle Regiment, 8th Infantry Silesian Regiment

=== Flags used by the Legion ===
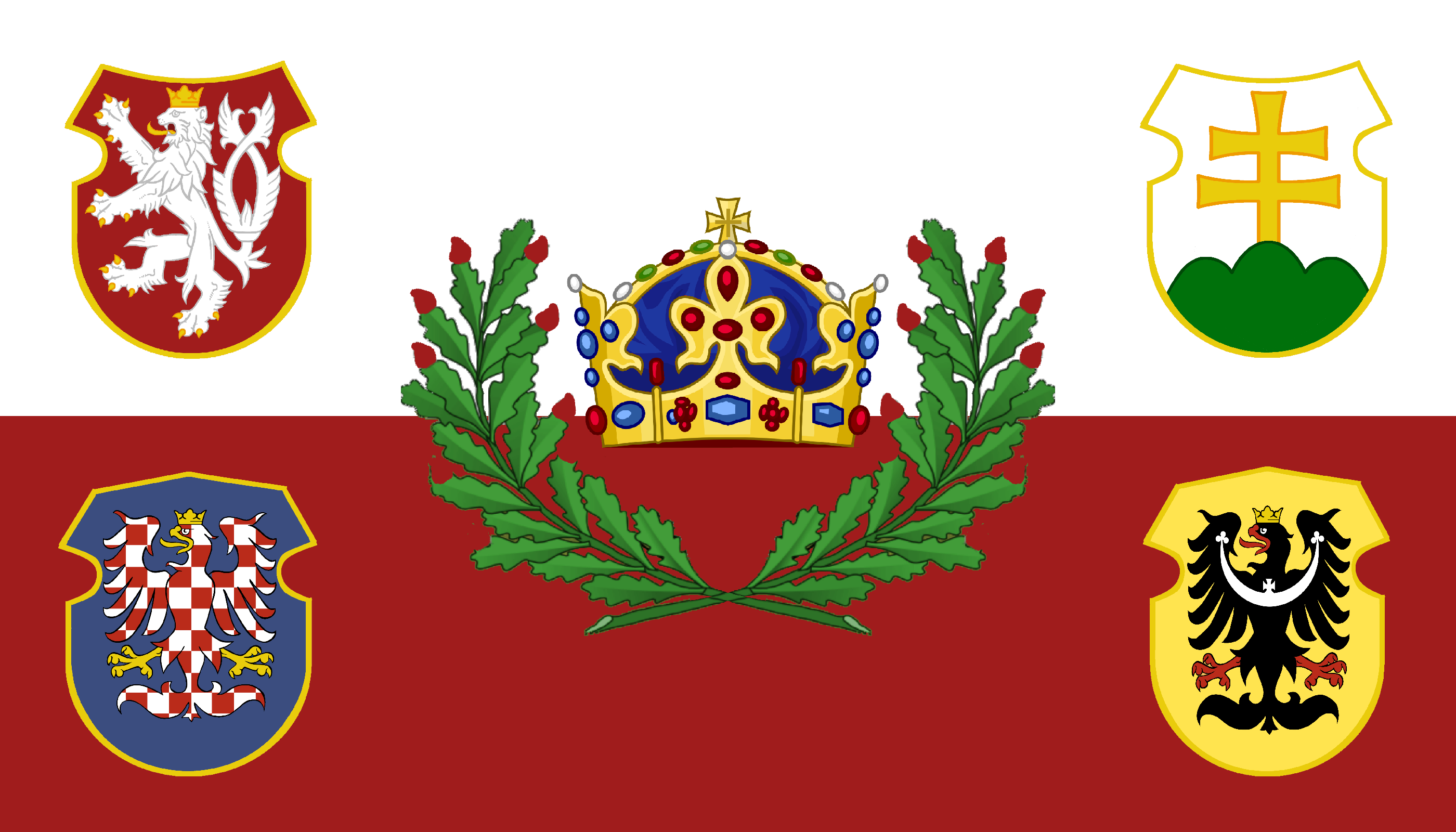
Czechoslovak Legion in Russia (front)

Czechoslovak Legion in Russia (rear)

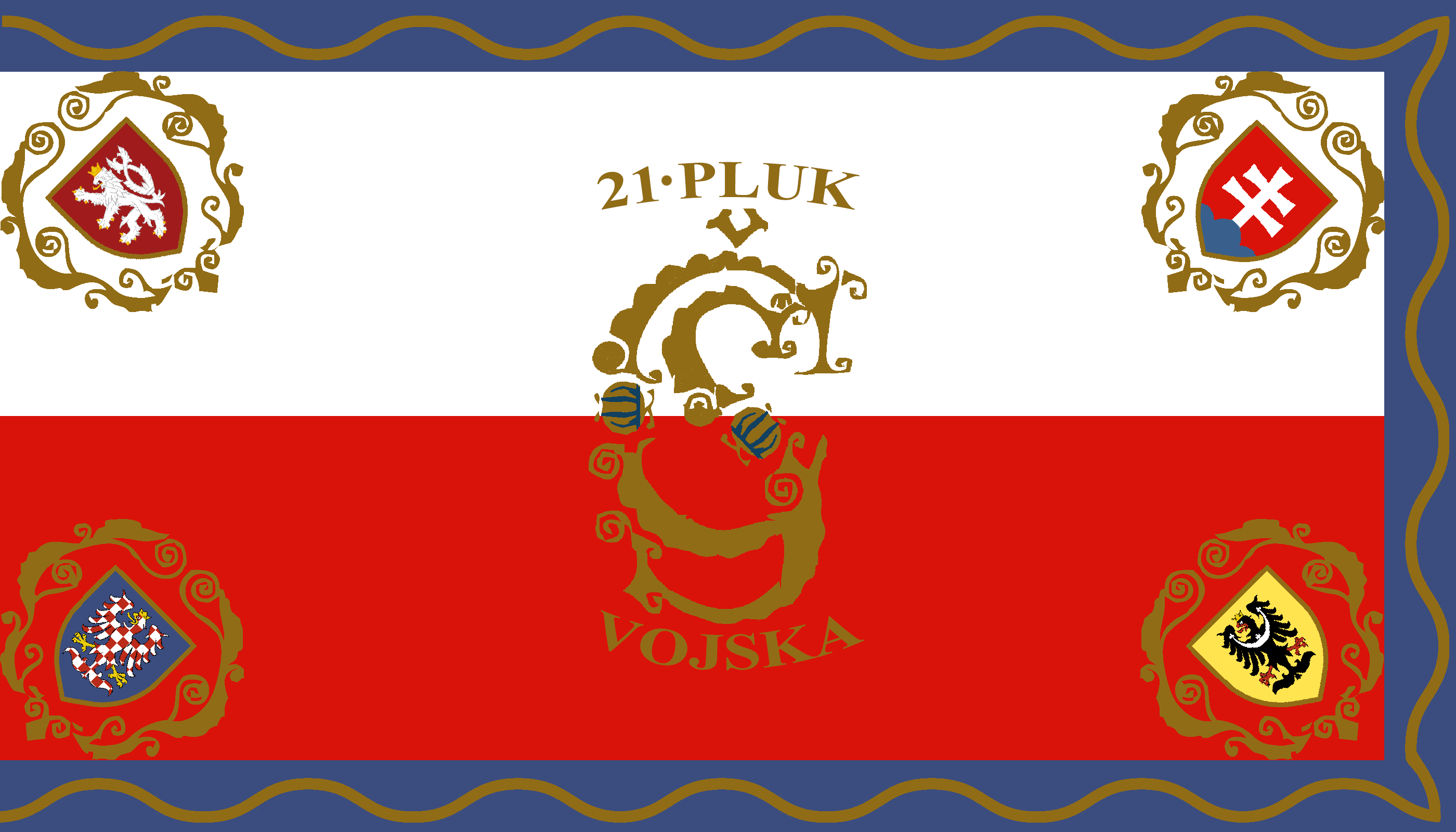
Czechoslovak Legion in France, 21st Regiment

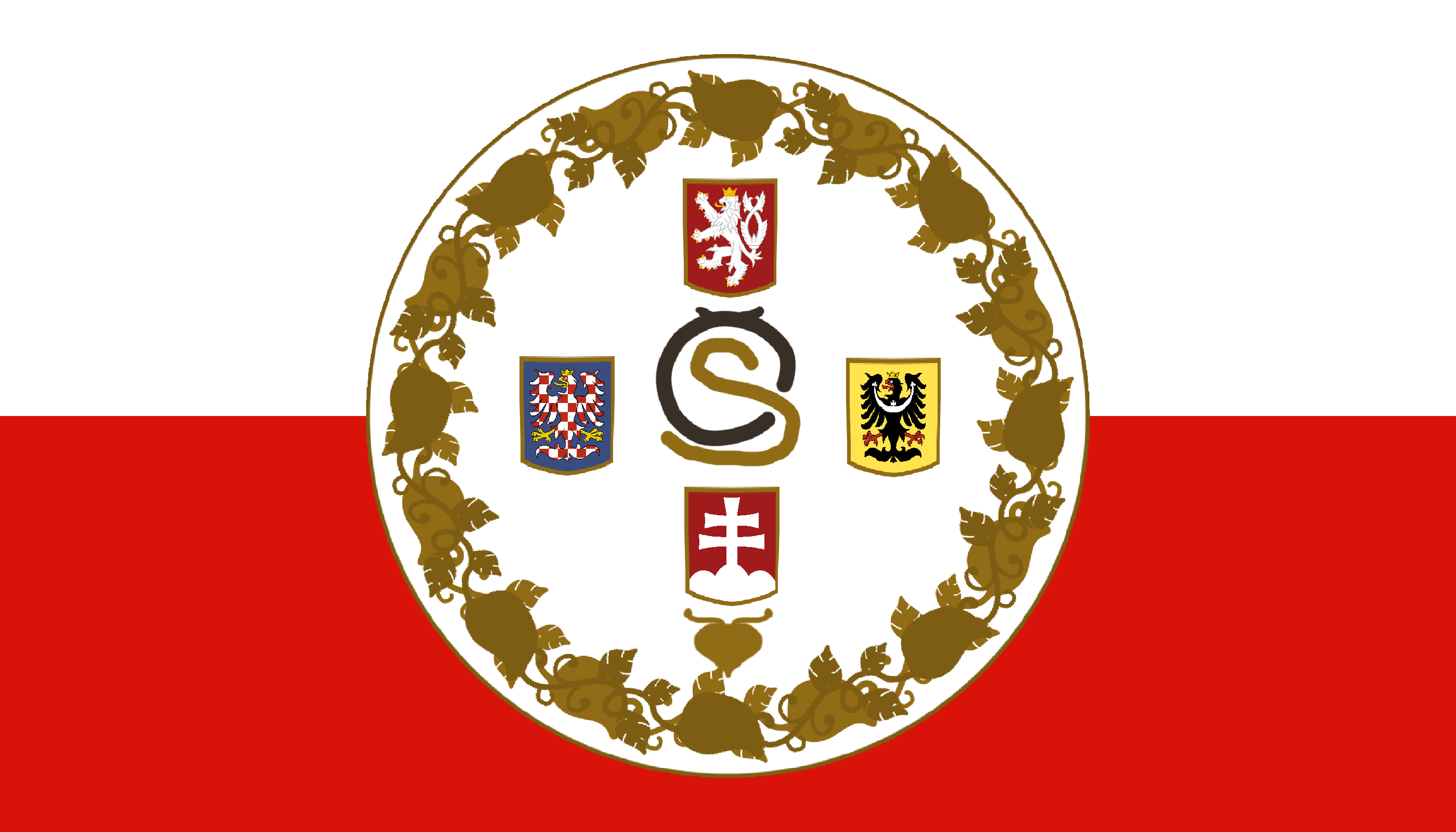
Czechoslovak Legion in Italy

1st Assault Battalion of the Czechoslovak Legion in Russia

Flags of legions’ regiments were white and red with embroidered symbols of the Czech countries and Slovakia, linden twigs, St. Wenceslas’ crown, letters “ S”, and Hussite themes.

The reverse side of the Russian legion's flag showed national colors for the Russian command, and Czech and Slovak colors for the Czechs and Slovaks.

The National Council of Czechoslovakia in exile, which led the anti-Austrian resistance, became the interim government on 26 September 1918 with the consent of France, Great Britain, and the US.

The first ceremonial hoisting of the Czechoslovak flag on the house inhabited by T. G. Masaryk, the head of the interim government, took place on 18 October 1918. Based on the historical flag of Bohemia, the Czechoslovak flag was defined as the connection of two stripes, i.e. a white one above a red one.

== Russian Civil War ==
=== Evacuation from Bolshevik Russia ===
Troop movements in the Russian Civil War. The dark grey lines show the maximum advance of the White forces, including the Czechoslovaks.

In November 1917, the Bolsheviks seized power throughout Russia and soon began peace negotiations with the Central Powers at Brest-Litovsk. The chairman of the Czechoslovak National Council, Tomáš Masaryk, who had arrived in Russia earlier that year, began planning for the Legion's departure from Russia and transfer to France so the Czechoslovaks could continue to fight against the Central Powers. Since most of Russia's main ports were blockaded, Masaryk decided that the Legion should travel from Ukraine to the Pacific port of Vladivostok, where the men would embark on transport vessels that would carry them to Western Europe.

In February 1918, Bolshevik authorities in Ukraine granted Masaryk and his troops permission to begin the 9,700-kilometre (6,000 mi) journey to Vladivostok. On 18 February, before the Czechoslovaks had left Ukraine, the German Army launched Operation Faustschlag (fist strike) on the Eastern Front to force the Soviet government to accept its terms for peace. From 5 to 13 March, the Czechoslovak legionaries successfully fought off German attempts to prevent their evacuation in the Battle of Bakhmach.

After leaving Ukraine and entering Soviet Russia, representatives of the Czechoslovak National Council continued to negotiate with Bolshevik authorities in Moscow and Penza to iron out the details of the corps' evacuation. On 25 March, the two sides signed the Penza Agreement, in which the legionaries were to surrender most of their weapons in exchange for unimpeded passage to Vladivostok. Tensions continued to mount, as each side distrusted the other. The Bolsheviks, despite Masaryk's order for the legionaries to remain neutral in Russia's affairs, suspected that the Czechoslovaks might join their counterrevolutionary enemies in the borderlands. Meanwhile, the legionaries were wary of Czechoslovak Communists who were trying to subvert the corps. They also suspected that the Bolsheviks were being pressured by the Central Powers to stall their movement towards Vladivostok.

By May 1918, the Czechoslovak Legion was strung out along the Trans-Siberian Railway from Penza to Vladivostok. Their evacuation was proving much slower than expected due to dilapidated railway conditions, a shortage of locomotives and the recurring need to negotiate with local soviets along the route. On 14 May, a dispute at the Chelyabinsk station between legionaries heading east and Magyar POWs heading west to be repatriated caused the People's Commissar for War, Leon Trotsky, to order the complete disarmament and arrest of the legionaries. At an army congress that convened in Chelyabinsk a few days later, the Czechoslovaks – against the wishes of the National Council – refused to disarm and began issuing ultimatums for their passage to Vladivostok. This incident sparked the Revolt of the Legions.

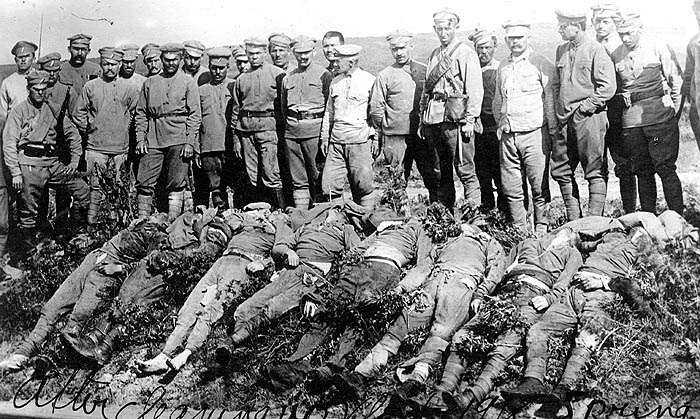
Soldiers of the 8th Regiment of the Czechoslovak Legion in Russia killed by Bolsheviks at Nikolsk-Ussuriysky, 1918. Standing above them are other members of the Czechoslovak Legion.

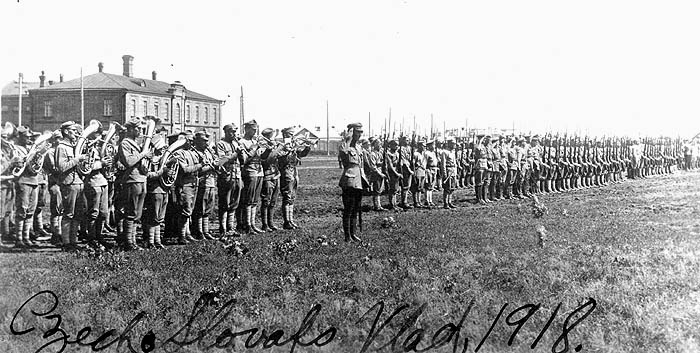
Czechoslovak troops in Vladivostok (1918)

Fighting between the Czechoslovak Legion and the Bolsheviks erupted at several points along the Trans-Siberian Railway in the last days of May 1918. By June, the two sides were fighting along the railway route from Penza to Krasnoyarsk. By the end of the month, legionaries under General Mikhail Diterikhs had taken control of Vladivostok, overthrowing the local Bolshevik administration. On July 6, the Legion declared the city to be an Allied protectorate, and legionnaires began returning across the Trans-Siberian Railway to support their comrades fighting to their west. Generally, the Czechoslovaks were the victors in their early engagements against the fledgling Red Army.

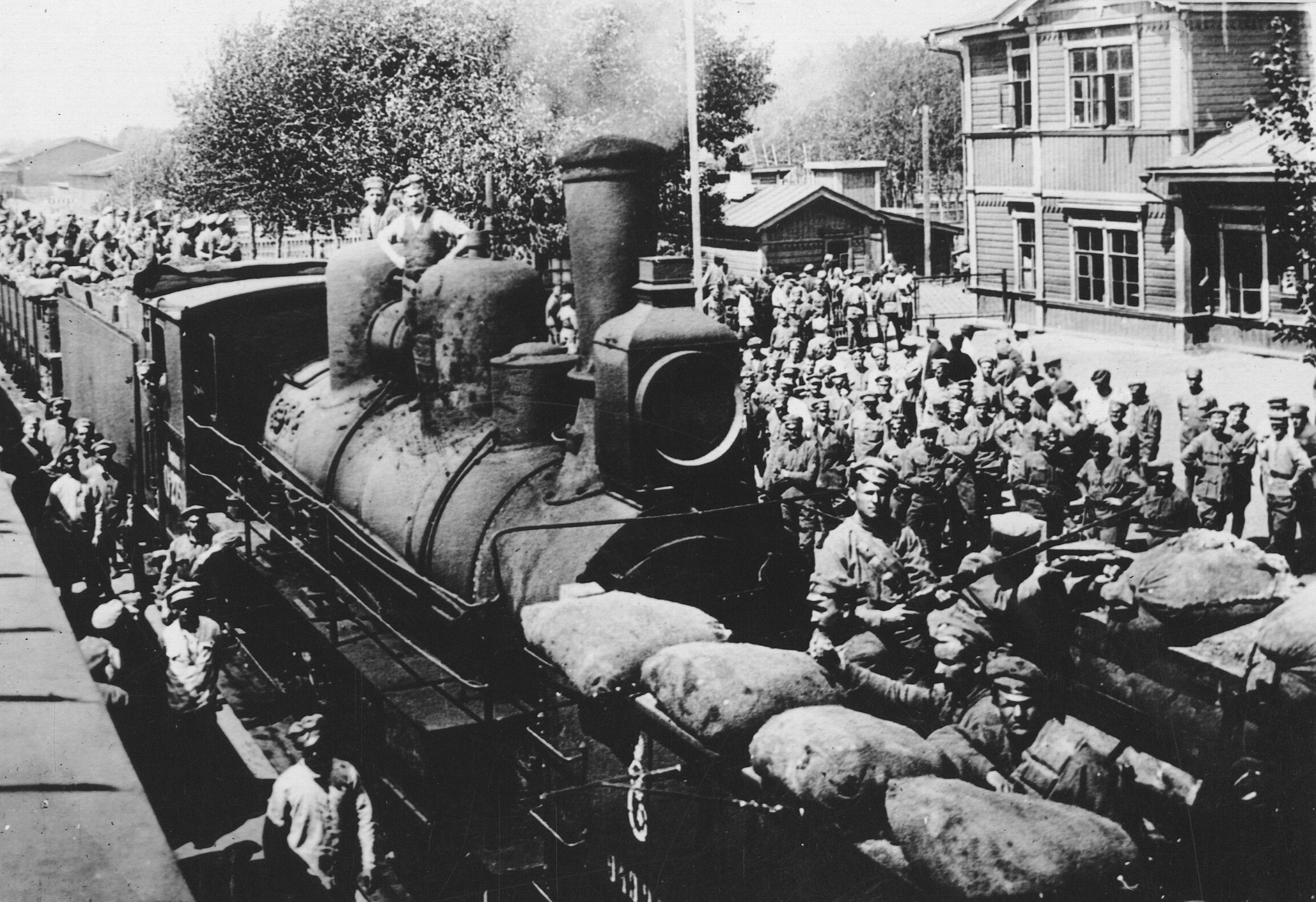
Improvised armored train of the 6th Regiment before leaving for combat action near Maryanovka, Isilkul railway station, 4 June 1918

By mid-July, the legionaries had seized control of the railway from Samara to Irkutsk, and by the beginning of September they had cleared Bolshevik forces from the entire length of the Trans-Siberian Railway. Legionnaires conquered all the large cities of Siberia, including Yekaterinburg, but Tsar Nicholas II and his family were executed there on the direct orders of Yakov Sverdlov less than a week before the arrival of the Legion.

=== Involvement in the Russian Civil War, 1918–1919 ===
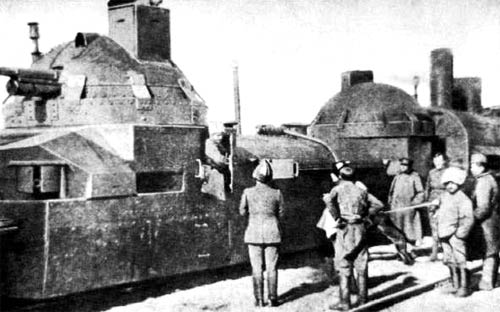
Czechoslovaks with armored train "Orlík", Russia

News of the Czechoslovak Legion's campaign in Siberia during the summer of 1918 was welcomed by Allied statesmen in Great Britain and France, who saw the operation as a means to reconstitute an eastern front against Germany. U.S. President Woodrow Wilson, who had resisted earlier Allied proposals to intervene in Russia, gave in to domestic and foreign pressure to support the legionaries' evacuation from Siberia. In early July 1918, he published an aide-mémoire calling for a limited intervention in Siberia by the U.S. and Japan to rescue the Czechoslovak troops, who were then blocked by Bolshevik forces in Transbaikal. But by the time most American and Japanese units landed in Vladivostok, the Czechoslovaks were already there to welcome them.

The Czechoslovak Legion's campaign in Siberia impressed Allied statesmen and attracted them to the idea of an independent Czechoslovak state. As the legionaries cruised from one victory to another that summer, the Czechoslovak National Council began receiving official statements of recognition from various Allied governments.

==== Capture of Imperial gold reserve ====
Shortly after they entered into hostilities against the Bolsheviks, the legionaries began making common cause with anti-Bolshevik Russians who began forming their own governments behind the Czechoslovaks' lines. The most important of these governments were the Komuch, led by the Social Revolutionaries, in Samara and the Provisional Siberian Government in Omsk. With substantial Czechoslovak help, the People's Army of Komuch won several important victories, including the capture of Kazan and an Imperial state gold reserve on 6–7 August 1918. Czechoslovak pressure was also crucial in convincing the anti-Bolshevik forces in Siberia to nominally unify behind the All-Russian Provisional Government, formed at a conference in Ufa during September 1918.

The banner of the First Assault Battalion of Czechoslovak Legions, adopted in February 1919 in Yekaterinburg

During the autumn of 1918, the legionaries' enthusiasm for the fighting in Russia, then mostly confined along the Volga and Urals, dropped precipitously. The professor Tomáš Masaryk supported them from the United States. The rapidly growing Red Army was getting stronger by the day, retaking Kazan on 10 September, followed by Samara a month later. The legionaries, whose strength had peaked at around 61,000 earlier that year, were lacking reliable reinforcements from POW camps and were disappointed by the failure of Allied soldiers from other countries to join them on the front lines.

On 28 October, Czechoslovak statehood was declared in Prague, arousing the troops with a desire to return to their homeland. The final blow to Czechoslovak morale arrived on 18 November 1918, when a coup in Omsk overthrew the All-Russian Provisional Government and installed a dictatorship under Admiral Aleksandr Kolchak in control of White Siberia.

During the winter of 1918–1919, the Czechoslovak troops were redeployed from the front to guard the route of the Trans-Siberian Railway between Novonikolaevsk and Irkutsk from partisan attacks. Alongside other legions formed from Polish, Romanian and Yugoslav POWs in Siberia, the Czechoslovaks defended the Kolchak government's only supply route for the duration of 1919.

==== Betrayal of the White Russians ====
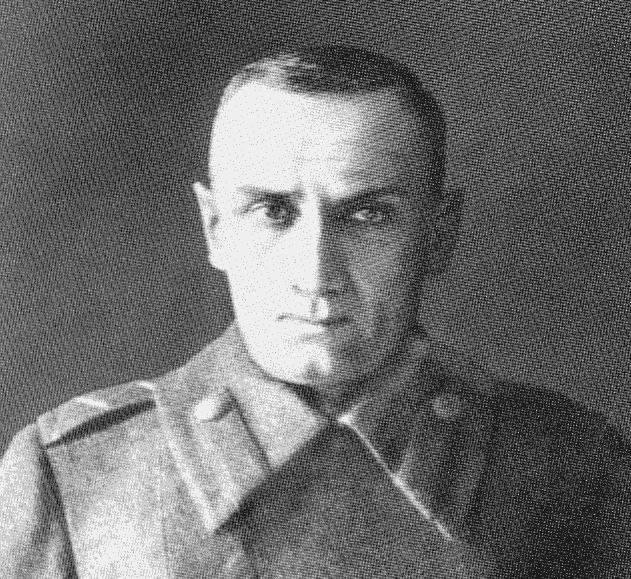
The last photo of Kolchak taken before his execution in 1920

During the summer and autumn of 1919, Kolchak's armies were in a steady retreat from the Red Eastern Army Group. On 14 November, the Reds took Omsk, Kolchak's capital, initiating a desperate eastward flight by the White army and refugees along the Trans-Siberian Railway. In the following weeks, the Whites' rear was further disorganised by widespread outbreaks of uprisings and partisan activity. The homesick legionaries, who simply wanted to leave Siberia without incurring any more casualties than necessary, declared their neutrality amid the unrest and did nothing to suppress the rebellions.

Meanwhile, Kolchak's trains, which included the gold bullion captured from Kazan, were stranded along the railway near Nizhneudinsk. After his bodyguard deserted him there, the legionaries were ordered by Allied representatives in Siberia to convey him to the British military mission in Irkutsk. This plan was resisted by insurgents along the Czechoslovaks' route, and as a result the legionaries, after consulting their commanders, Generals Janin and Jan Syrový, made the controversial decision to turn Kolchak over to the Political Centre, a government formed by Socialists-Revolutionaries in Irkutsk.

On 7 February 1920, the legionaries had signed an armistice with the Fifth Red Army at Kutin, whereby the latter allowed the Czechoslovaks unimpeded passage to Vladivostok. In exchange, the legionaries agreed not to try to rescue Kolchak, and to leave the remaining gold bullion with the authorities in Irkutsk. Earlier that day, Kolchak had been executed by a Cheka firing squad to prevent his rescue by a small White army then on the outskirts of the city. His body was dumped under the ice of the frozen Angara River and never recovered.

When the White Army learned about the execution, its remaining leadership decided to withdraw farther east. The Great Siberian Ice March followed. The Red Army did not enter Irkutsk until 7 March, and only then was the news of Kolchak's death officially released. Because of this, and also because of an attempted rebellion against the Whites, organised by Radola Gajda in Vladivostok on 17 November 1919, the Whites accused the Czechoslovaks of treason, but were too weak to act against them.

=== Evacuation from Vladivostok, 1920 ===
When the armistice with the Bolsheviks was concluded, dozens of Czechoslovak trains were still west of Irkutsk. On 1 March 1920, the last Czechoslovak train passed through that city. The legionaries' progress was still hampered at times by the Japanese Expeditionary Force and the troops of Ataman Grigori Semenov, who stalled the Czechoslovak trains to delay the arrival of the Red Army in Eastern Siberia. By then the evacuation of Czechoslovak troops from Vladivostok was well underway, and the last legionaries left the port in September 1920.

The total number of people evacuated with the Czechoslovak Legion in Russia was 67,739; including 56,455 soldiers, 3,004 officers, 6,714 civilians, 1,716 wives, 717 children, 1,935 foreigners and 198 others. After their return to Czechoslovakia, many formed the core of the new Czechoslovak Army.

The number of legionaries killed in Russia during World War I and the Russian Civil War was 4,112. An unknown number went missing or deserted the legion, either to make an arduous journey to return home or to join the Czechoslovak Communists. Among the latter was Jaroslav Hašek, later the author of the satirical novel The Good Soldier Švejk.

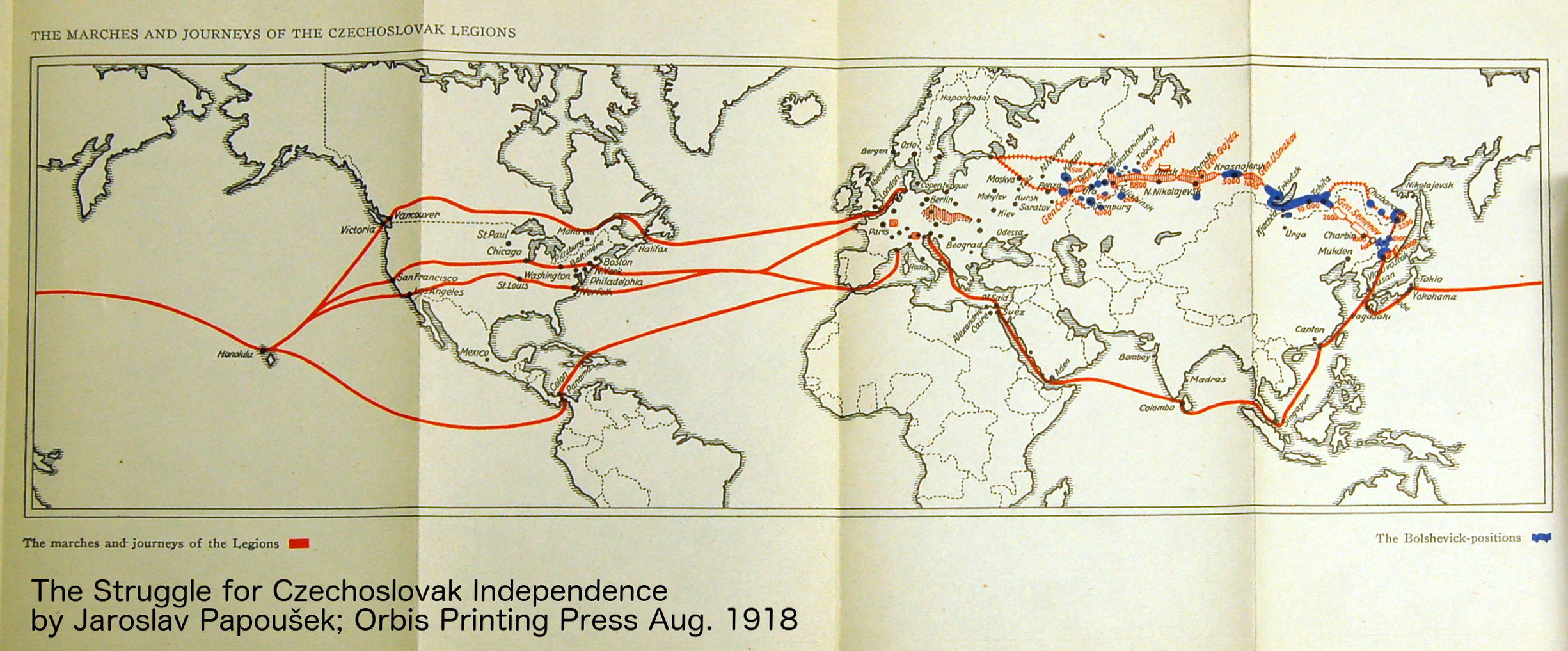
A map of the routes the Czechoslovak Legion in Russia took home.

==== Evacuation ====
A total of 36 transports were dispatched from Vladivostok.

Evacuation and Allies
Country	Quantity	Percent
USA	36,026	53 %
Great Britain	16,956	25 %
Czechoslovakia*, other allies	14,921	22 %
*A part of Centro-Commission	9,683	14.3 %

- The Allies provided 21 ships—United States 12, Britain 9. Two ships were provided by the American Red Cross. The ships President Grant and Heffron made all or part of the journey twice.
- 12 ships were chartered by the Centrocommission; 9683 people were taken away. Two Japanese ships and one Russian were chartered for cargo. For the transport of people, boats were bought or rented mainly in Japan (7), China (1) and Russia (1). The first ship dispatched by the Centro-Commission was the Japanese Liverpool-Maru, sailing on July 8, 1919. The regular transport of legionnaires and partially disabled people began on December 9, 1919, with the transport of the 1st Regiment on the Jonan-Maru. The last ship with people was the Nizhny Novgorod, which sailed on February 13, 1920. The last ship with cargo was the Shunko-Maru, which sailed from Vladivostok on May 14, 1920.
- The first ship to take the first Siberian legionnaires from Vladivostok was the Italian Roma on January 15, 1919, and the last was the Heffron on September 2, 1920. The first ships sailed to Naples and Marseille. Others passed through the Panama Canal, others to North America, others to Canada with the final port of Hamburg. The whole evacuation took 1 year and 8 months.

Ships
Ship Name	Country of origin	Quantity	Departed from Vladivostok	Arrival Port
Roma	Kingdom of Italy	139	15. 1. 1919	10. 3. 1919 Naples
Liverpool Maru	Czechoslovakia	139	9. 7. 1919	12. 9. 1919 Marseille
Nižnij Novgorod	Russia	664	13. 2. 1920	8. 4. 1920 Trieste
Mount Vernon	Germany, USA	3,452	13. 4. 1920	6. 6. 1920 Trieste
Amerika	Germany, USA	6,478	23. 4. 1920	7. 6. 1920 Trieste
President Grant	Germany, USA	5,471	27. 4. 1920 and 24. 8. 1920	12. 6. 1920 and 13. 10. 1920 Trieste
Ixion	Germany, United Kingdom	2,945	23. 5. 1920	17. 7. 1920 Cuxhaven
Dollar	Germany, United Kingdom	3,427	6. 6. 1920	20. 7. 1920 Cuxhaven
USAT Sherman	USA	1,546	24.6.1920	7.7.1920 Trieste
USAT Logan	USA	1,789	21. 7. 1920	28. 9. 1920 Trieste
Legie	Japan, Czechoslovakia	70 or 87	24. 8. 1920	12. 10. 1920 Trieste
Heffron	USA	720 then 875	13. 8. 1919 and 2. 9. 1920	17. 12. 1919 and 11. 11. 1920 Trieste

== Ranks of the Czechoslovak Legion in Russia ==
=== Commissioned officer ranks ===
The rank insignia of commissioned officers.

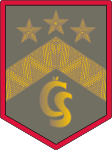
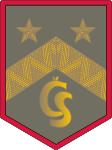
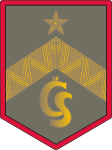
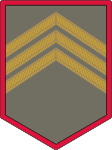
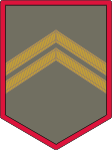
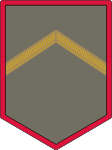
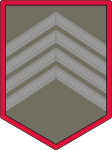
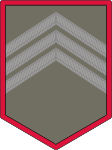
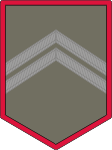
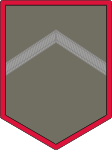
Rank group	General / flag officers			Senior officers			Junior officers
(Bohemia) Czechoslovak Legion
(Bohemia) Czechoslovak Legion	Generál zbrani	Generálporučík	Generálmajor	Plukovník	Podplukovník	Kapitan	Podkapitán	Poručík	Podoručík	Praporčík
						(Major from Oct. 1918)	(Kapitán from Oct. 1918)

=== Other ranks ===
The rank insignia of non-commissioned officers and enlisted personnel.

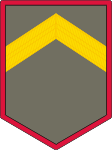
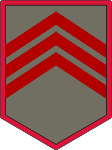
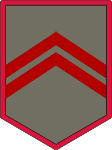
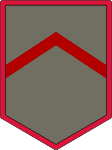
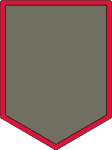
Rank group	NCO				Enlisted
(Bohemia) Czechoslovak Legion
(Bohemia) Czechoslovak Legion	Podpraporčík (Abolished Oct. 1918)	Šikovatel	Čatar	Desiatnik	Slobodnik	Vojak

== Postwar ==
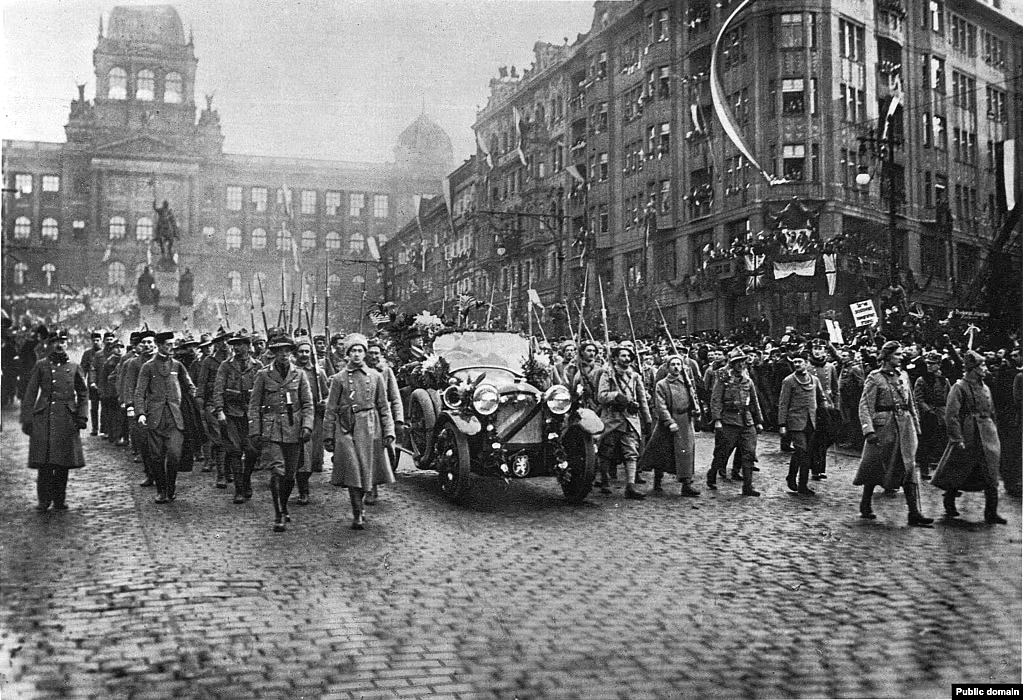
Czechoslovak Legion on the 21st of December, 1918)

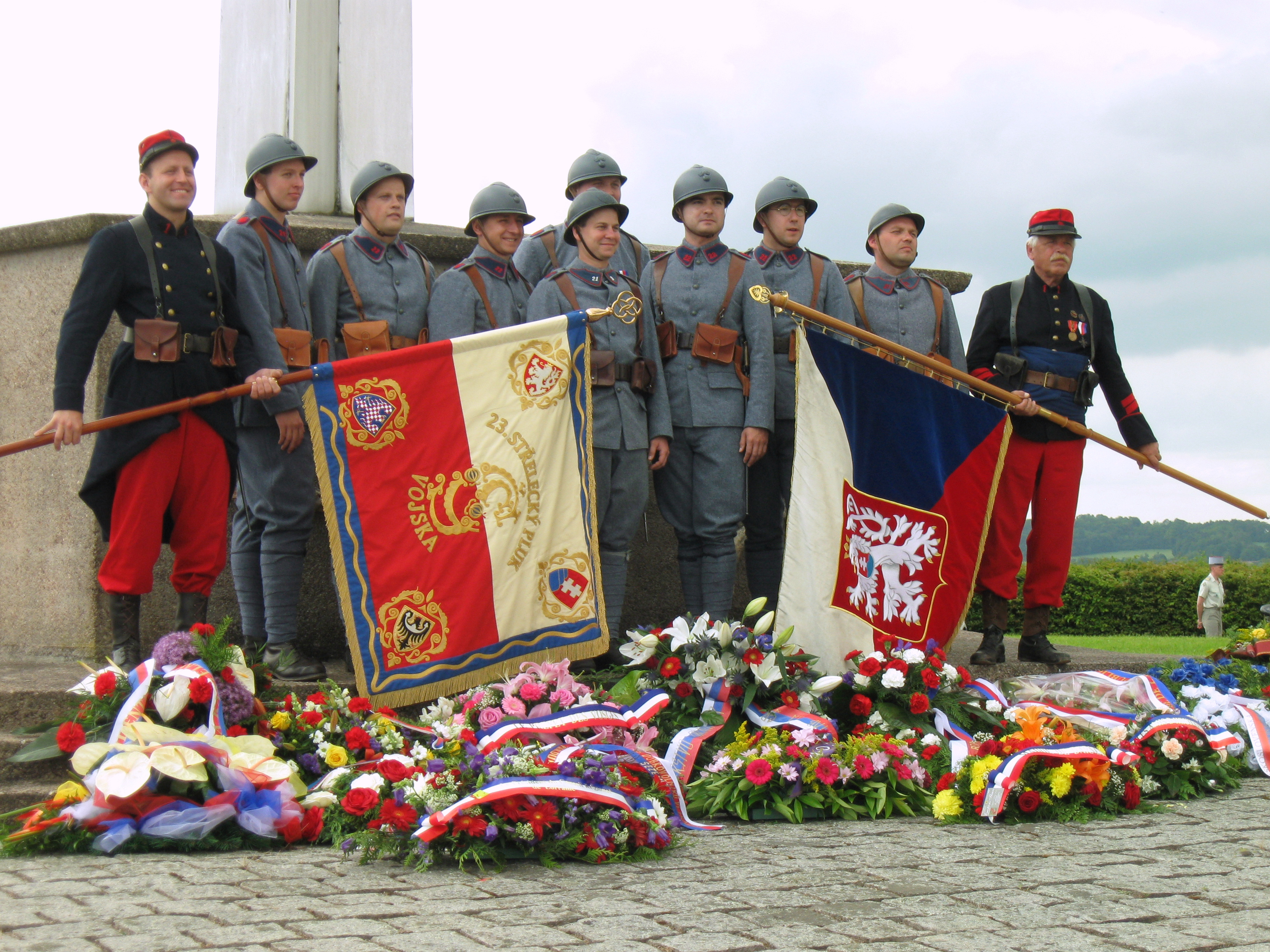
Remembrance Ceremony at the memorial of 30 June 2013, with the unit in uniforms of CS legionnaires in France

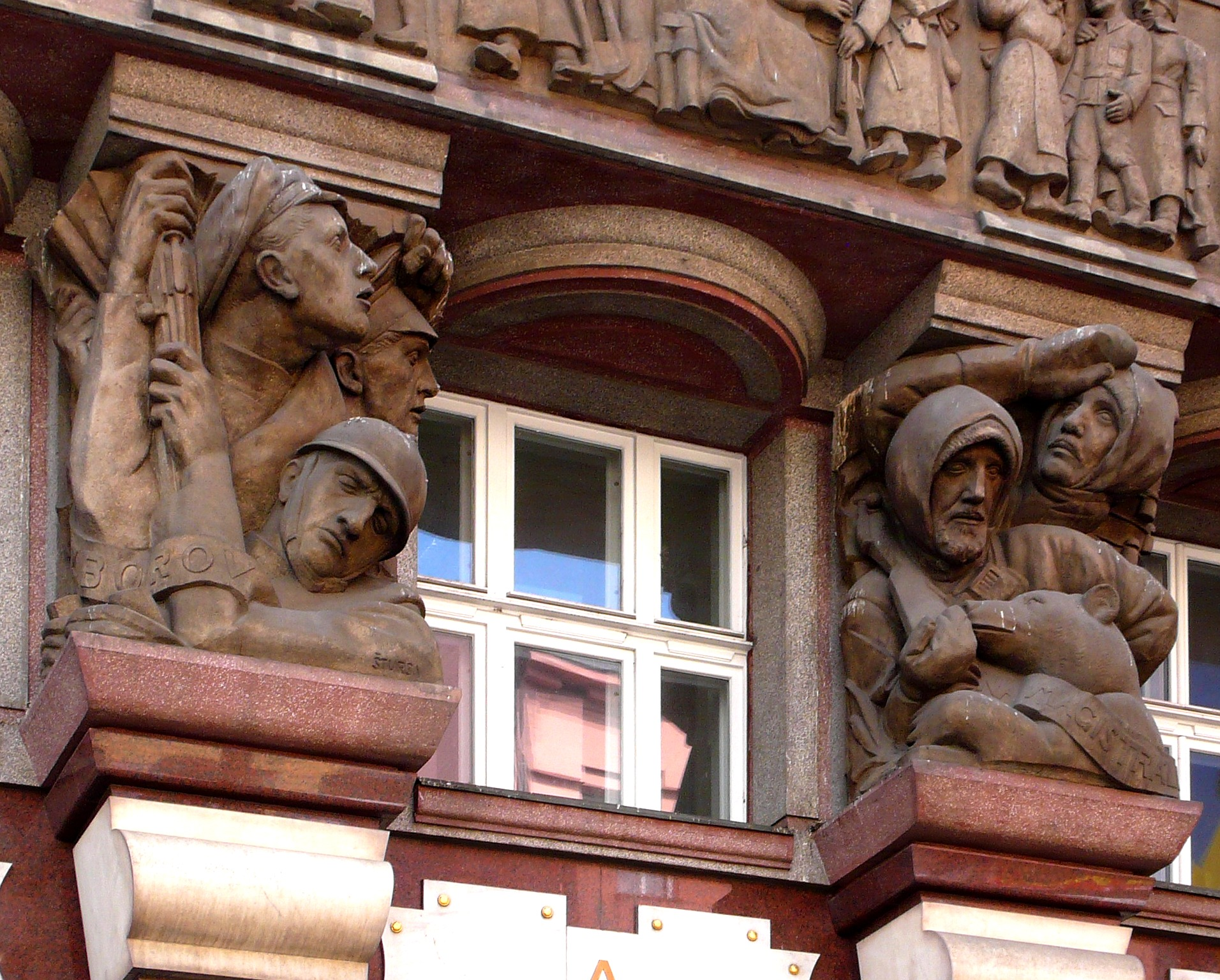
The façade of the Legiobanka main office in Prague is decorated with reliefs of war scenes.

Czechoslovakia declared its independence from the disintegrating Austria-Hungary on 28 October 1918 with President Tomáš Garrigue Masaryk of the Czechoslovak Republic. Members of the Legions formed a significant part of the new Czechoslovak Army. A French military mission began in Czech territories after January 1919, led by General Maurice Pellé. After some disagreements with the Italian-led Czechs in Slovakia, President Masaryk eventually replaced Italian General Luigi Piccione with Pellé on July 4, 1919, and essentially ended the Italian connection to the Legion.

The French military mission's role was to integrate the existing Czechoslovak Foreign Legions with the home units of the Army and develop a professional command structure. On October 15, 1919, the main staff of the Czechoslovak Army was officially formed. French officers were installed as territorial commanders and commanders of some divisions. Over the course of time, there were 200 French non-commissioned officers, over 100 commissioned officers and 19 Generals. General Pellé and his immediate replacement, General Eugène Mittelhauser (also French), were the first chiefs staff of the Czechoslovak Army.

The Legion took part in the Hungarian–Czechoslovak War. On January 1, 1919, Legion troops took control of the city of Bratislava and Italian Colonel Riccardo Barreca was appointed military commander of the city. Several clashes (which killed at least nine Hungarian demonstrators) took place and Barreca himself was injured. The Italian officers continued to assist in the operations against the Hungarians during the war. Many veterans of the legion also fought in the Polish–Czechoslovak War.

Legion veterans formed organizations such as the Association of Czechoslovak Legionnaires (Československá obec legionářská) and Legiobanka (Legionářská banka, a bank formed with the capital they had gathered during their long service). These and other organizations were known as the Hrad ("The [Prague] Castle") for their support of the President of Czechoslovakia.

=== In literature ===
The 2005 novel The People's Act of Love, by the British writer James Meek, describes the occupation of a small Siberian town by a company of the Czechoslovak Legion in 1919. The original inhabitants of the town are members of the Christian sect of Skoptsy, or castrates.

A memoir Přál jsem si míti křídla by Jozef Dufka was published in magazine Zvuk during 1996-1999 and as a book in 2002 (ISBN 80-86528-08-1).

Gustav Becvar (August Wenzel Engelbert (Gustav) Bečvář) published his memoir The Lost Legion in English in 1939.

=== In art ===
1919 Czechoslovak Legion Stamps

Two postage stamps, issued in 1919, were printed for use by Czechoslovak Legion in Siberia.

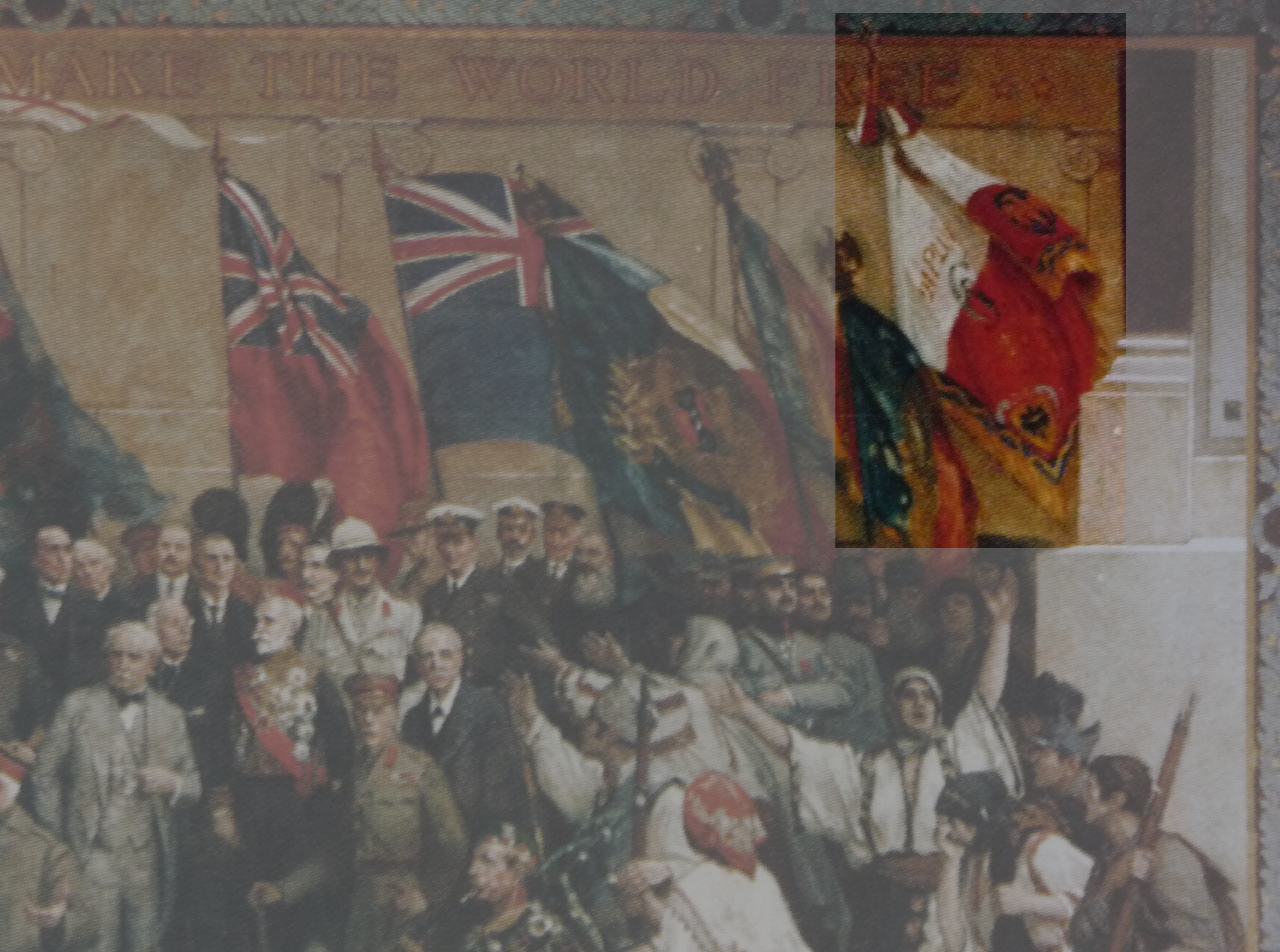
From the Allies in the painting the Panthéon de la Guerre, this detail highlights the flag of the Czechoslovak Legion. The Legion served on three separate fronts: France, Italy, and Russia. Total number of troops est. 75,000.

The flag of the Czechoslovak Legion can be seen in the Allies in the monumental painting Pantheon de la Guerre.

The Mounted Patrol (Jízdní hlídka in Czech) is a 1936 Czechoslovak movie and drama about a skirmish of the Czechoslovak Legion with Bolsheviks in Siberia.

Last Train Home is a real-time tactics video game developed by Ashborne Games, in which the player controls a train carrying Czechoslovak Legion troops along the Trans-Siberian Railway during their withdrawal. The game was released on 28 November 2023.

== See also ==
- List of states and regions involved in the Russian Civil War
- Bibliography of the Russian Revolution and Civil War
- Outline of the Russian Revolution and Civil War
- South African support to the Czechoslovak Legion
- Josef Šnejdárek
