= Otto Gutfreund =

Czech sculptor (1889–1927)

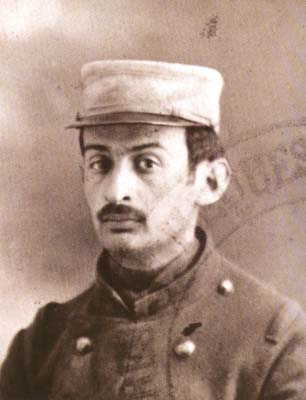
Otto Gutfreund in the French Foreign Legion, 1914

Otto Gutfreund (also written Oto Gutfreund; 3 August 1889 – 2 June 1927) was a Czech sculptor. After studying art in Prague and Paris, he became known in the 1910s for his sculptures in a cubist style. After his service in the First World War he worked in a more realistic style. His later work includes many small polychrome ceramic figures as well as architectural decorations.

== Early life ==
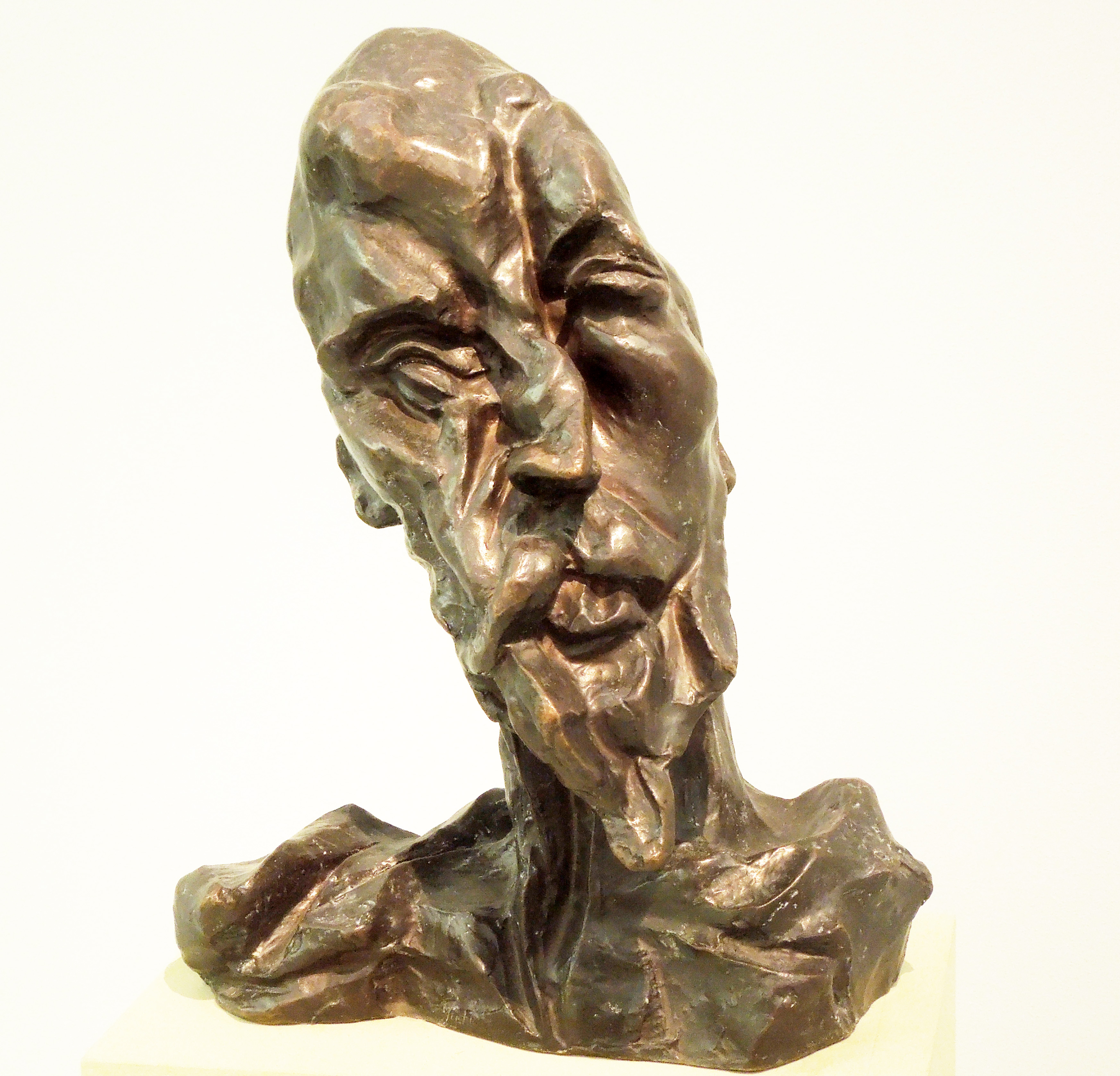
Otto Gutfreund, Don Quixote, 1911–12

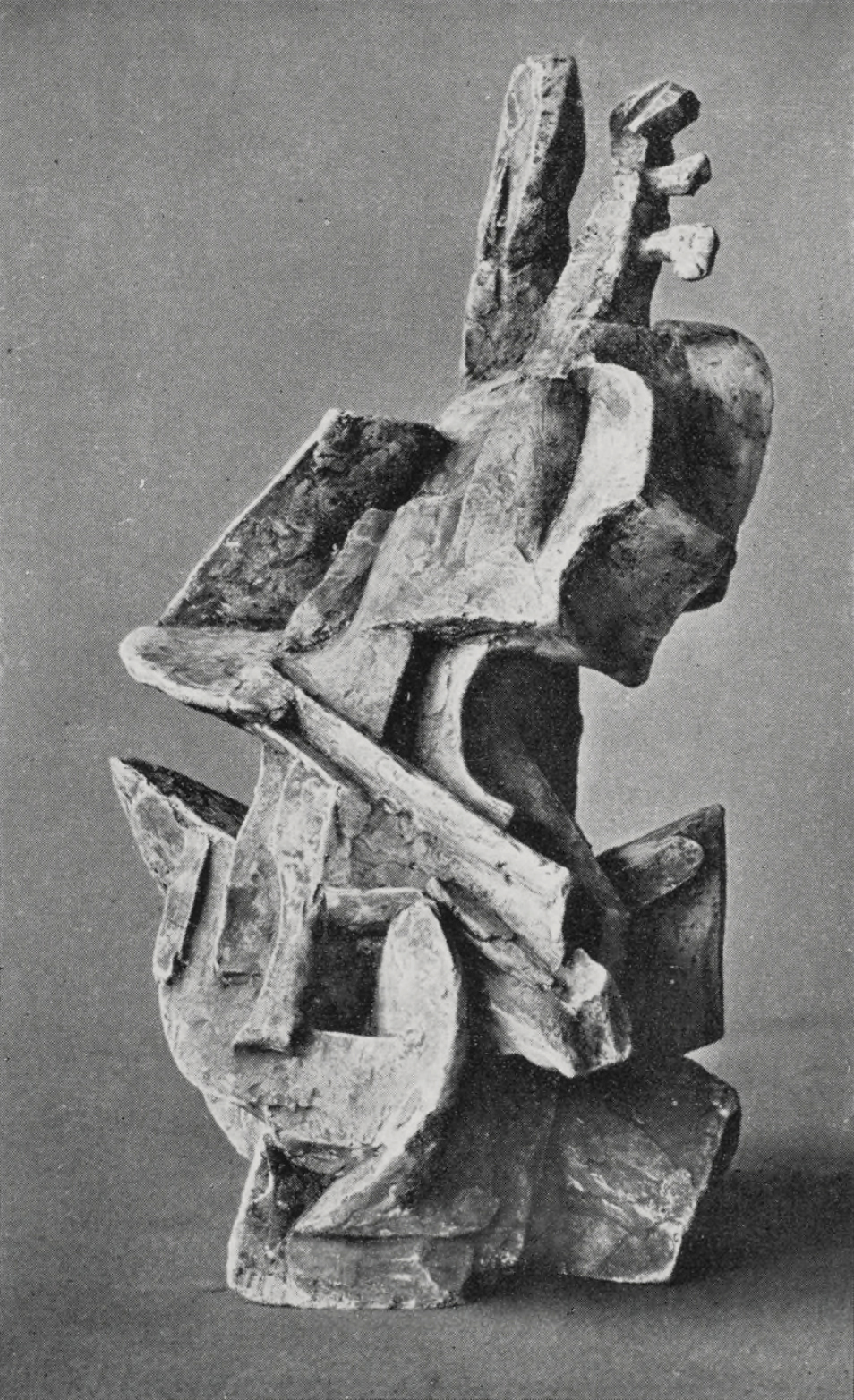
Otto Gutfreund, Violoncelliste (Cellist), 1912–13

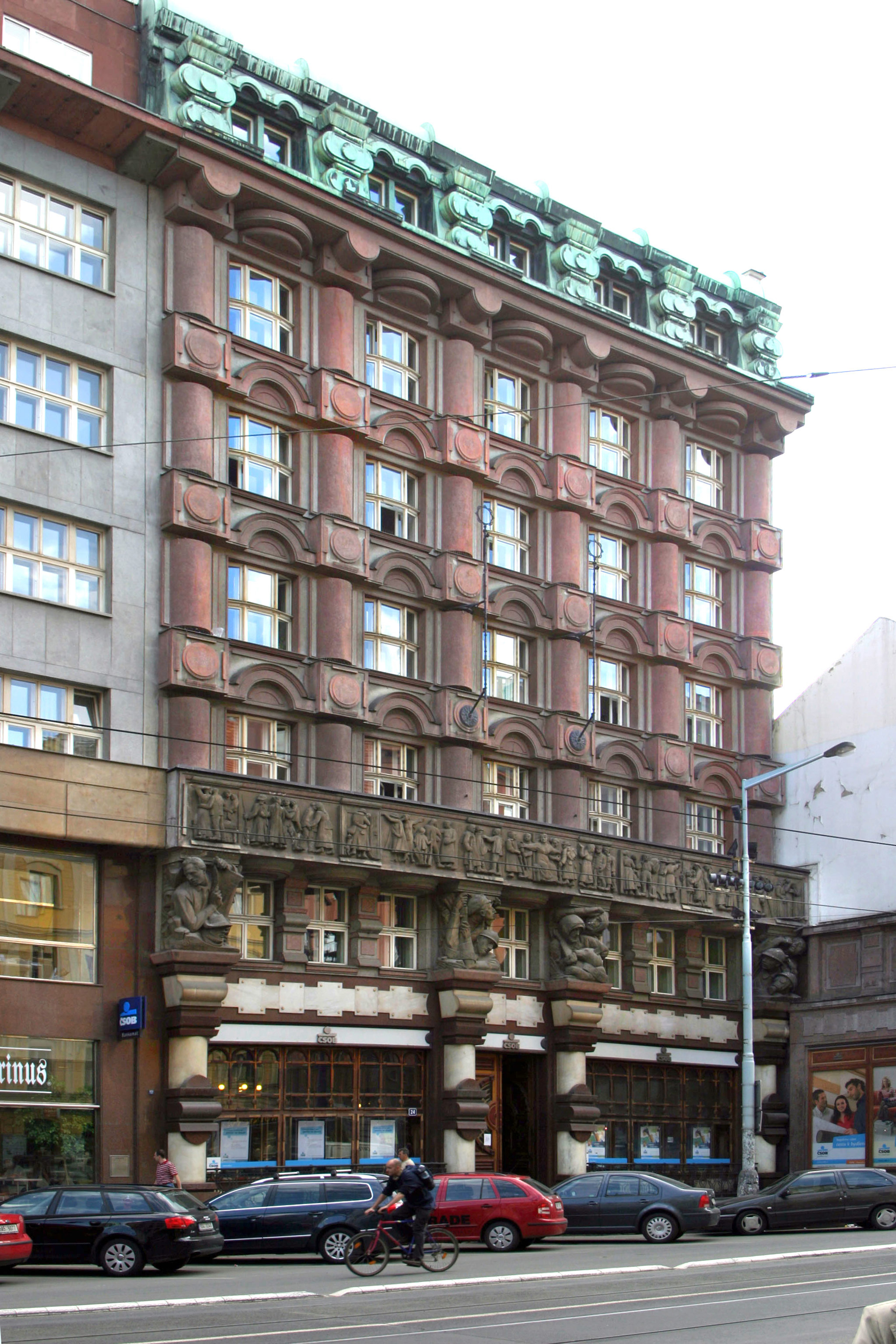
Josef Gočár's Legiobank Building, Prague (1922–23). Relief on facade by Gutfreund.

Otto Gutfreund was born in the town of Dvůr Králové nad Labem, Bohemia, into a Jewish family as the fourth of five children of Karel and Emilie Gutfreund. During 1903 to 1906 he studied pottery at the Škola výtvarných umění (School of Creative Arts) in the town of Bechyně. From 1906 to 1909 he studied in the figurative and ornamental modelling department of the Umělecko-průmyslová škola (College of Decorative Arts) in Prague.

Gutfreund discovered the works of the French sculptor Antoine Bourdelle during his 1909 exhibition in Prague organized by the artistic group Mánes Union of Fine Arts. Gutfreund then moved to Paris where he studied under Bourdelle at the Académie de la Grande Chaumière from 1909 to 1910.

In Paris he met Auguste Rodin and discovered medieval art. In 1910 he left Paris and travelled to Great Britain, Belgium, and Germany before returning to Prague.

== Prague ==
In 1912 Gutfreund became a member of Skupina výtvarných umělců (Group of Creative Artists) in Prague and exhibited there his first cubo-expressionist sculpture Úzkost (Anxiety). The next year he participated in the second exhibition of the Group and showed his works Hamlet, Harmony and Concert. Between 1913 and 1914 he used the principles of analytical cubism in his work. In the third exhibition Gutfreund displayed the cubo-expressionist works Viki and Head with a Hat. He exhibited at Der Sturm gallery in Berlin and at the fourth Group exhibition in Prague. In 1914 he travelled to Paris where he met Pablo Picasso, Juan Gris, Guillaume Apollinaire and Daniel-Henry Kahnweiler.

== World War One ==
At the declaration of the First World War Gutfreund was in Paris and decided to join the French Foreign Legion. He participated at the fighting on the Somme, at L'Artois and Champagne. In 1915 he applied to join the French Army and the following year had been imprisoned after his application was refused both for the French Army and the Czechoslovak Legion. He spent two years in a prison camp at Saint-Michel de Frigolet Abbey near Avignon. In 1918 he was moved to a civilian camp at Blanzy and after his release he settled in Paris to continue his work. For a short time he returned to Prague to accept a membership of the artistic group SVU Mánes.

== 1920s and death ==
In 1920 Gutfreund moved permanently to Czechoslovakia and lived in Prague and his birthplace town Dvůr Králové nad Labem. His works of the 1920s are generally realistic in form, and exemplify the postwar "return to order" in the arts. He executed many small works in polychrome ceramic, such as the Textile Worker (1921) in the National Gallery in Prague. In 1921 he participated at the third exhibition of the Tvrdošíjní group of artists in Prague, Brno and Košice. In 1924 he exhibited at the Exhibition of Modern Czechoslovak Art in Paris and in 1925 in the Czechoslovak Pavilion of International Decorative Arts Exhibition in Paris. The following year Gutfreund was made a professor of architectural sculpture at the Umělecko-průmyslová škola (College of Decorative Arts) in Prague and took part in the Société Anonyme exhibition in New York City.

On 2 June 1927 Gutfreund, at the height of his artistic powers, drowned in the river Vltava in Prague. He was buried in Vinohrady Cemetery.

== Legacy ==
Jiří Kotalík, Director of the National Gallery in Prague, wrote in 1979:

Otto Gutfreund is one of the few Czech artists whose work is of significance not only in his home setting but internationally. He was greatly conscious of the contemporary problems in European sculpture at a decisive stage of development, and he made an original contribution towards their solution.

== Selection of works ==
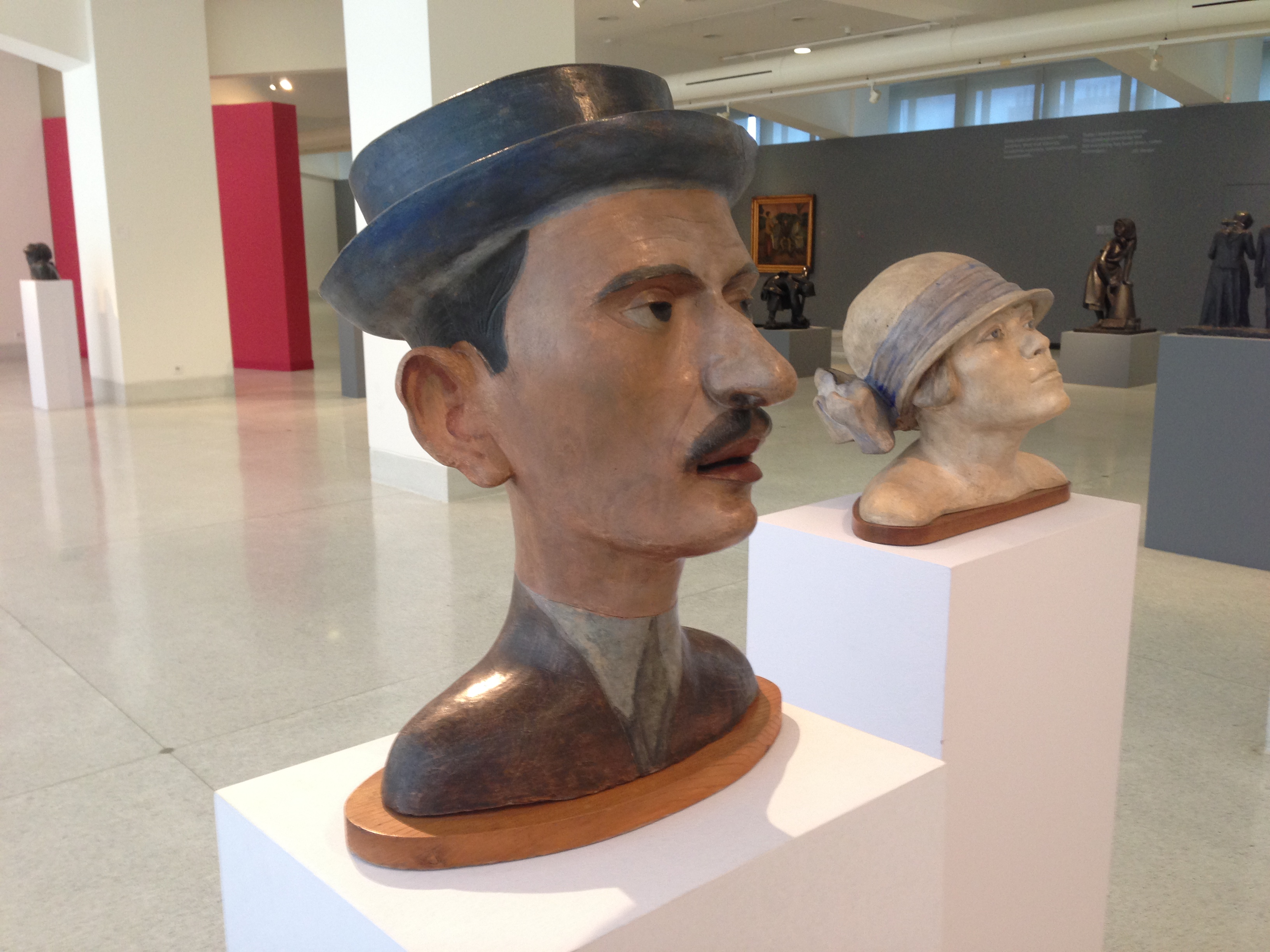
Gutfreund's Vlastní portrét (Self-portrait, 1919) and Podobizna umělkovy choti Milady (Portrait of the Artist's Wife Milada, 1923–1924) at the Veletržní palác, National Gallery in Prague

- Anxiety (1911–1912)
- Hamlet II (1912)
- Don Quixote (1911–1912)
- Viki (1912–1913)
- Cellist (1912–1913)
- Head with a hat (1913–1914)
- Group: Lovers (1913–1914)
- Head (1916)
- Sitting Woman (1916)
- Woman's Head (1919)
- Mask with a Necklace (1919–1920)
- Own Portrait (1919)
- Legions' Return – relief on Josef Gočár's Legiobanka Building, Prague (1922–1923)
- Portrait of Artist's Wife (1923)
- Sitting Woman II (1927)

== See also ==
- Czech Cubism
