= Hrad (politics) =

Czech political term

The term Hrad (Czech: [ˈɦrat], "castle") is used as shorthand for the political groups that were centered on the President of Czechoslovakia, and later President of the Czech Republic.

The first president of Czechoslovakia, Tomáš Masaryk, had very limited formal powers, such as representing the country abroad, declaring war, making peace and naming ambassadors. Masaryk wished to implement the American model of a strong presidency, and used his considerable informal authority to obtain more power (e.g. to recall government ministers) and to set up a more-or-less independent political structure centered on himself.

The common term used for this structure was "the group of the Castle", or skupina okolo Hradu in Czech, meaning the Prague Castle, the official seat of the president. The term Hrad (capitalized) was coined by the media and used as a slur by political opponents.

Hrad included organizations such as Czechoslovak Unity of Legionnaires (Československá obec legionářů - soldiers from the Czechoslovak Legions), Legiobanka (a large bank), the Czechoslovak Hussite Church which Masaryk helped to establish, individual entrepreneurs, politicians from several parties and influential journalists like Ferdinand Peroutka and Karel Čapek). The group had significant monetary resources available and kept an informal intelligence network. In 1925 they established a new political party, the National Labour Party (mockingly nicknamed "the party of the Castle, Hradní strana) but it failed in the 1925 parliamentary elections and was dissolved five years later.

The next president, Edvard Beneš, tried to follow the direction set by Masaryk and kept Hrad above and outside political parties. After the communist takeover of power in Czechoslovakia in February 1948, the real center of power moved to the Central Committee of the Party and to Moscow.

After the Communist party fell from power in 1989, the new president Václav Havel tried to use his influence to retain his powers against the rising influence of political parties. His effort failed and Havel's role eventually became mostly ceremonial. The term Hrad had occasionally appeared again in Czech media to label the political movements, parties and individuals centered on Havel. Since they were unsuccessful the term was invariably meant as a mockery.

Since the end of World War II Czech historians have used the term in works about politics of prewar Czechoslovakia.
