= Borovnice (Rychnov nad Kněžnou District) =

- Municipality
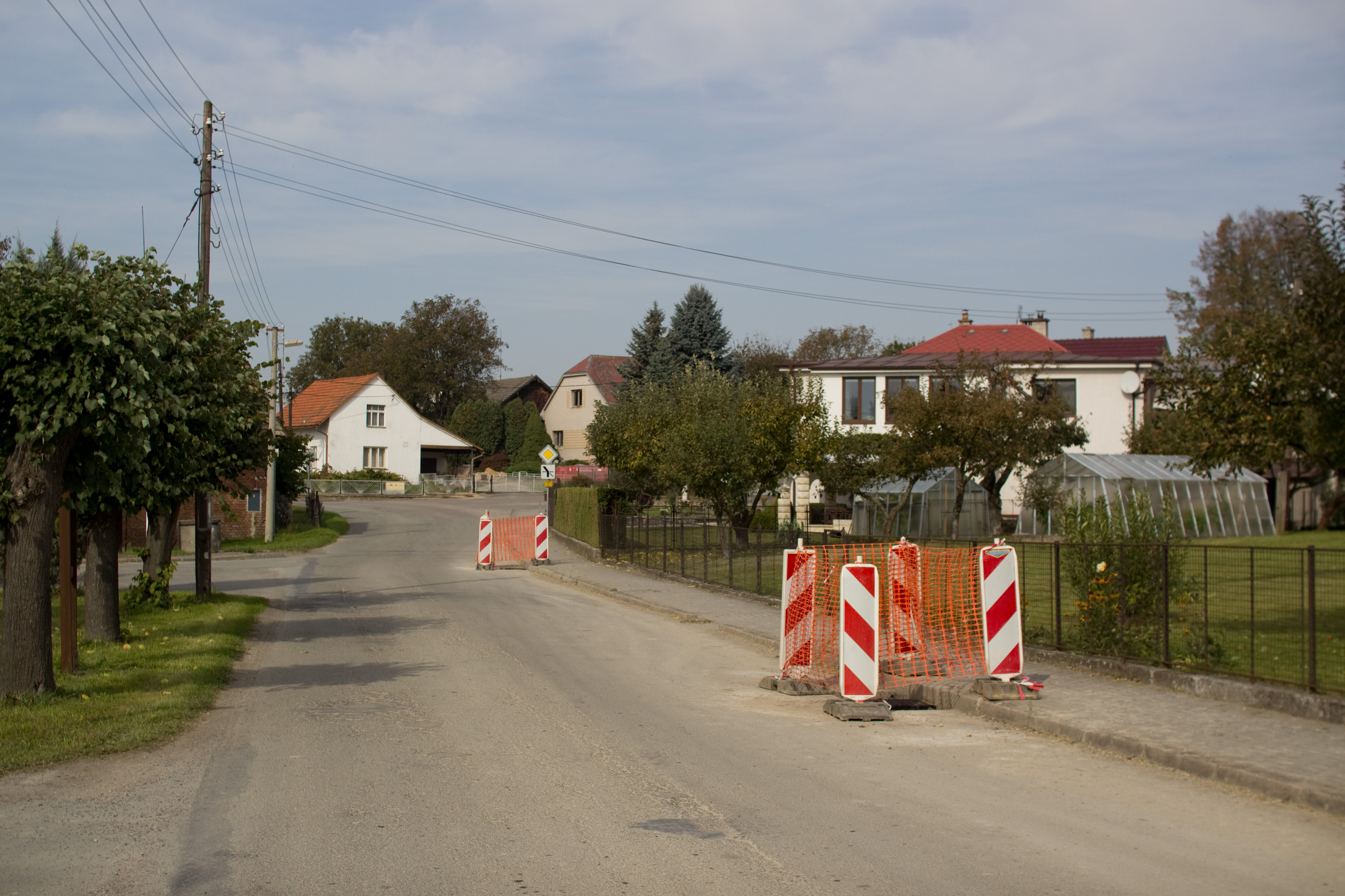
- Main street

- Flag Coat of arms

- Location in the Czech Republic
- Coordinates: 50°3′47″N 16°14′43″E
- Country: Czech Republic
- Region: Hradec Králové
- District: Rychnov nad Kněžnou
- First mentioned: 1449

Area
  - Total: 8.20 km^{2} (3.17 sq mi)
- Elevation: 312 m (1,024 ft)

Population (2026-01-01)
  - Total: 404
  - Density: 49.3/km^{2} (128/sq mi)
- Time zone: UTC+1 (CET)
  - Summer (DST): UTC+2 (CEST)
- Postal code: 517 41
- Website: www.borovnice.info

Borovnice (Czech pronunciation: [ˈborovɲɪtsɛ]; German: Kienwald) is a municipality and village in Rychnov nad Kněžnou District in the Hradec Králové Region of the Czech Republic. It has about 400 inhabitants.

== Administrative division ==
Borovnice consists of four municipal parts (in brackets population according to the 2021 census):

- Borovnice (142)
- Homole (11)
- Přestavlky (130)
- Rájec (114)

== Etymology ==
The name Borovnice is derived from the Czech adjective borovná (which is derived from borovice, i.e. 'pine'). Borovnice was a common toponym for pine forests and streams flowing through pine forests, and from there it was transferred to settlements.

== Geography ==
Borovnice is located about 11 kilometres (7 mi) south of Rychnov nad Kněžnou and 32 km (20 mi) southeast of Hradec Králové. It lies on the border between the Orlice Table and Svitavy Uplands. The highest point is at 401 m (1,316 ft) above sea level. The Brodec Stream flows through the municipality and supplies two local fishponds.

== History ==
The first written mention of Borovnice is from 1449. Rájec was first mentioned in 1399 and Přestavlky in 1400. Until 1756, Borovnice was owned by various less important noblemen. From 1756, it was a property of the Kinsky family.

== Demographics ==
Historical population

Year	Pop.	±%
1869	736	—
1880	768	+4.3%
1890	758	−1.3%
1900	725	−4.4%
1910	692	−4.6%

Year	Pop.	±%
1921	687	−0.7%
1930	576	−16.2%
1950	511	−11.3%
1961	503	−1.6%
1970	459	−8.7%

Year	Pop.	±%
1980	406	−11.5%
1991	415	+2.2%
2001	371	−10.6%
2011	385	+3.8%
2021	397	+3.1%

Source: Censuses

== Transport ==
There are no railways or major roads passing through the municipality.

== Sights ==
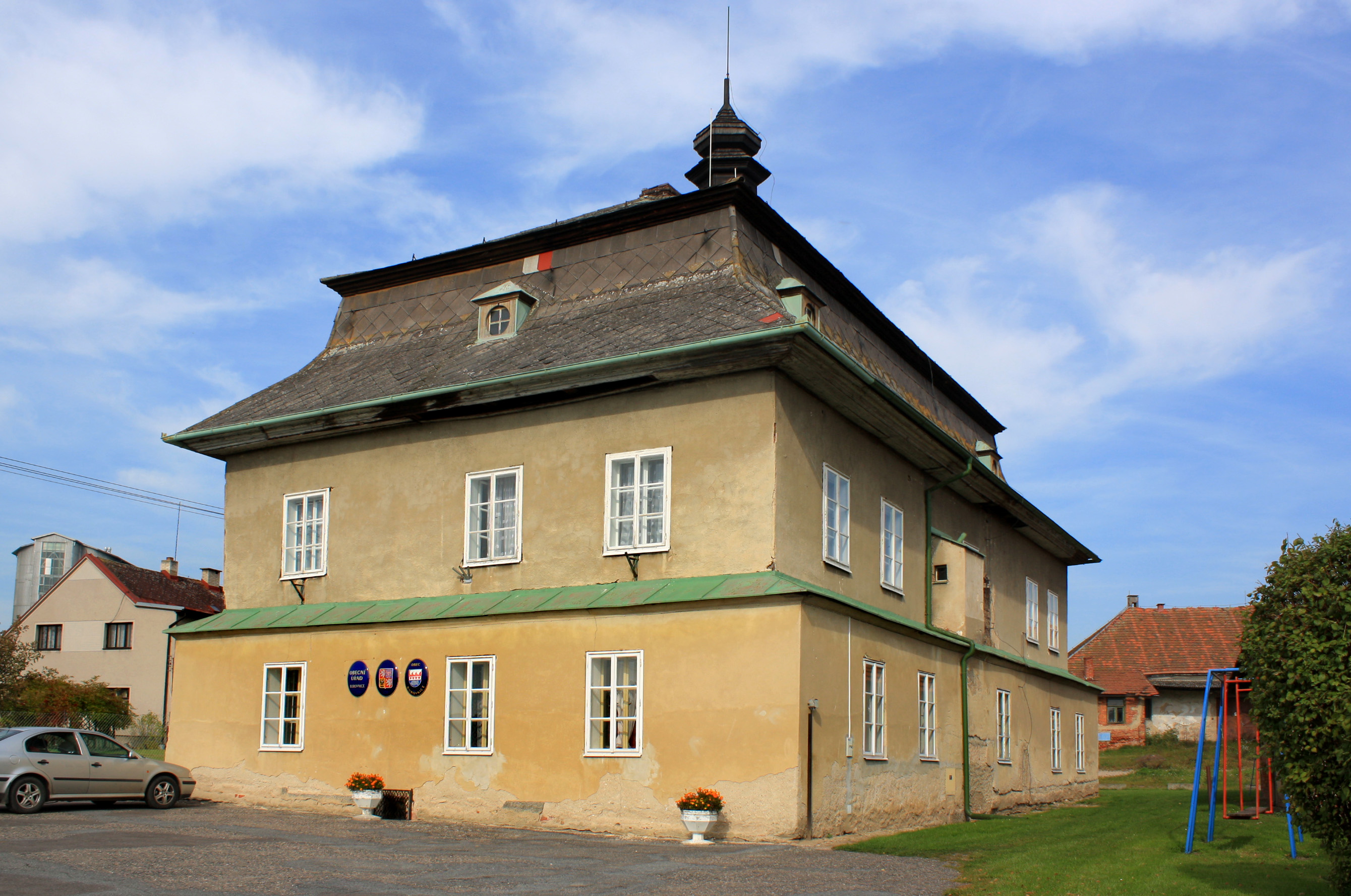
Přestavlky Castle

The most valuable monument is the Přestavlky Castle. It was gradually built in the Baroque and Neoclassical styles between 1650 and 1750, on the site of an older fortress.

The village of Homole gave its name the nearby pilgrimage site with the Church of Our Lady of Sorrows, but it is located just outside the municipal boundaries.

== Notable people ==
- František Marek (1899–1971), architect
