= Czechoslovak Communist Party in Russia =

Czechoslovak Communist Party in Russia was a Czechoslovak section of the Russian Communist Party (bolsheviks), founded by Czechoslovak left-wing Social Democrats living in Russia. The Czechoslovak Communist Party in Russia held its founding congress in Moscow May 25–29, 1918. Largely, the organization consisted of Czechoslovak prisoners of war. Alois Muna was the chairman of the Czechoslovak Communist Party in Russia.

The founding congress of the Czechoslovak Communist Party in Russia called Czech and Slovak workers to unite in the struggle for a proletarian revolution and the creation of a Czechoslovak socialist republic. The congress also endorsed the formation of the new Communist International. Whilst the congress was taking place, Czechoslovak legions attacked the Soviet state. The congress condemned the usage of Czechoslovak legions against Soviet Russia and called upon Czech and Slovak workers to defend Soviet Russia against counter-revolution and foreign intervention. After the congress, Czechoslovak units were formed inside the Red Army.

The Czechoslovak Communist Party in Russia was the first Czechoslovak communist organization, albeit it existed only in exile. Several of the members of the party would play important roles in the Czechoslovak communist movement after returning home to Czechoslovakia. Muna served as the chairman of the Communist Party of Czechoslovakia 1923-1924.

The official organ of the party was Průkopník svobody.
