= František Marek (architect) =

Czech architect

- Born: 26 November 1899; Borovnice, Austria-Hungary
- Died: 18 July 1971 (aged 71); Prague, Czechoslovakia
- Occupation: Architect

František Marek (26 November 1899 – 18 July 1971) was a Czech architect. His work was part of the architecture event in the art competition at the 1948 Summer Olympics.
