= Battle of Doss Alto =

1918 battle on the Italian Front during the First World War

Coordinates: 45°51′29″N 10°54′35″E

- Part of the Italian Front (World War I)
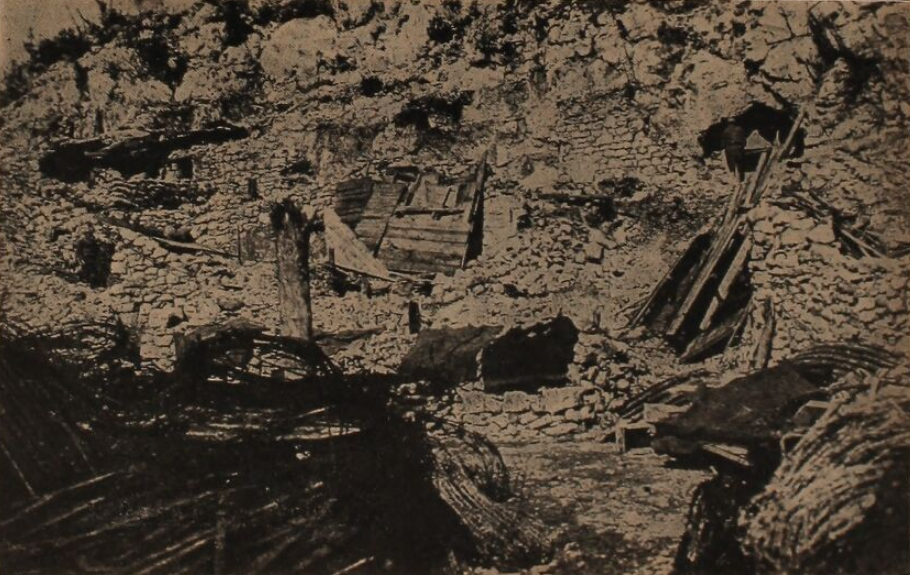
- Battlefield of Doss Alto (autumn 1918)
Date	21 September 1918
Location	Doss Alto di Nago hill near Nago-Torbole, northern Italy
Result	Czechoslovak Victory

Belligerents
(Kingdom of Bohemia) Czechoslovak Legion	Austria-Hungary

Commanders and leaders
(Kingdom of Italy) Andrea Graziani (Kingdom of Bohemia) Jindřich Varhaník (Kingdom of Bohemia) Oldřich Trojánek †	(Austria-Hungary) ?

Units involved
(Kingdom of Bohemia) 6th Infantry Division; (Kingdom of Bohemia) 33nd Infantry Regiment; (Kingdom of Bohemia) 34nd Infantry Regiment	(Austria-Hungary) Assault Battalion Riva

Casualties and losses
7 killed 31 wounded 4 captured and executed	51 killed 90 wounded 60 captured

The Battle of Doss Alto was a minor military engagement between the troops of Austria-Hungary and Italy on the Italian front of World War I on 21 September 1918. The battle took place on the Doss Alto di Nago hill in northern Italy. Italian regiments, composed of the members of Czechoslovak Legion in Italy, were able to defend their post on the hillside against Austro-Hungarians. The victory later became the most celebrated battle of the Legion on the Italian Front.

== Background ==
Since 1916 Austro-Hungarian Army prisoners of war of Czech and Slovak origin in Italy started to form volunteer legions, which then joined Italian Royal Army on the warfare against Austro-Hungarian troops. Number of enlisted men was growing and during the summer of 1918 Czechoslovak volunteers formed the 6th Czechoslovak Division, which consisted of the 31st, 32nd, 33rd, and 34th Infantry Regiments, under the command of Italian general Andrea Graziani (1864–1931).

In August 1918, this division moved to the front where it took up a position in a sector about 20 kilometers long between Lago di Garda and the Adige River. Their task was to guard this sector on the site of Altissimo mountain massif, with Doss Alto di Nago hill (703 meters above sea level), near Nago-Torbole, as a central point.

== Battle ==
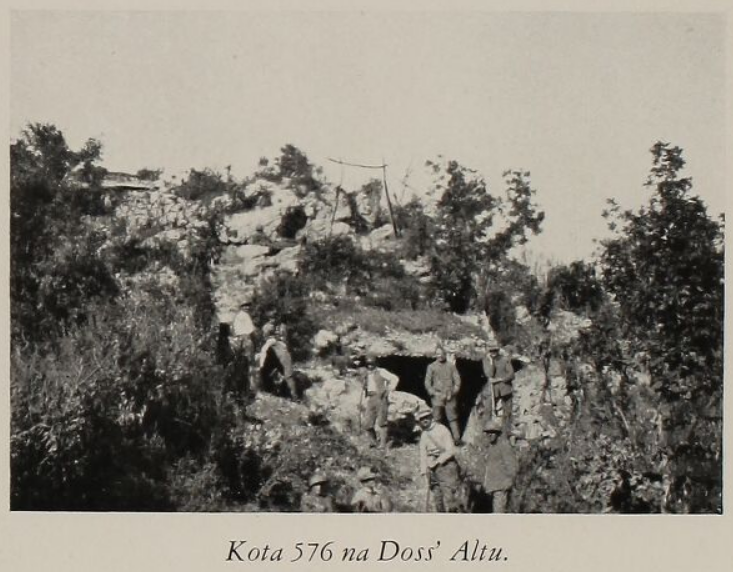
Czechoslovak legionnaries at hill 576 of Doss Alto (1918)

On 21 September, the Austro-Hungarian units consisting of Riva Assault Battalion, significantly outnumbering the enemy, tried to capture trenched fortifications of Doss Alto, occupied by the soldiers of 33rd and 34th Czechoslovak Rifle Regiments. The Austro-Hungarian attack began in the morning around 4:00 a.m. with a strong two-hour artillery barrage directed mainly at the Czechoslovak positions. This was followed by a bayonet attack on the top of Doss Alto from the northwest and northeast. The main weight of the defense was borne by the 33rd Czechoslovak Regiment, which, after being reinforced by reserves, successfully managed to retook previously captured trenches and defend the position.

== Aftermath ==
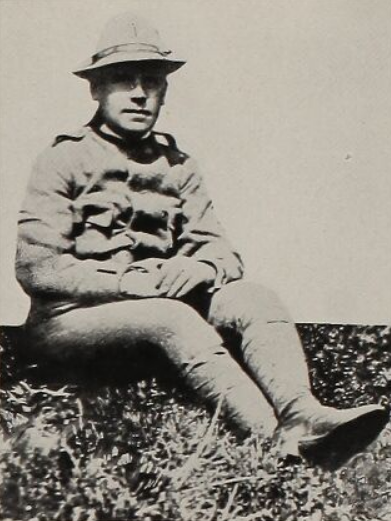
Oldřich Trojánek, fallen Czechoslovak officer

During the clast 7 Czechoslovak legionnaires died, 31 were wounded and 4 fell into Austrian captivity and were later hanged in Arc as deserters. Two of the fallen, lieutenants František Svoboda and Oldřich Trojánek, were officers. Trojánek committed suicide by shooting himself with a revolver at his advanced post after being surrounded and threatened with capture, which for him would also mean a prompt execution. 51 Austro-Hungarian soldiers was killed, 90 wounded and 60 captured.

== Memory ==
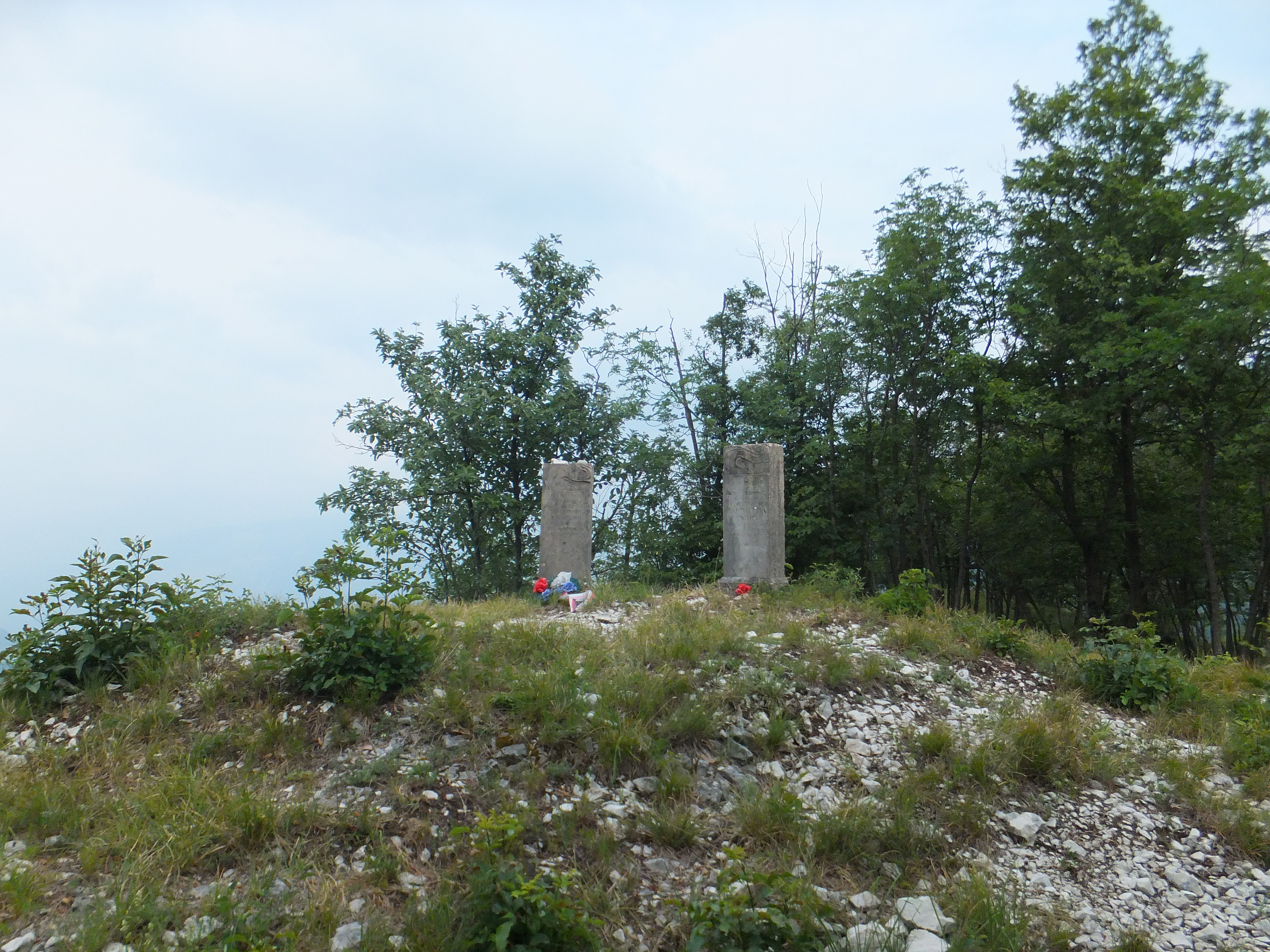
Memorials on the top of Doss Alto di Nago (2024)

The defense of Doss Alto caught the attention of Italian government and helped the fact, that on 3 October 1918 Italy started the process of recognising the Czechoslovak National Council in Paris as a de facto government of future Czechoslovakia.

During the First Czechoslovak Republic era the battle was a solid part of a heroic narrative of Czechoslovak Legions in Italy. In 1938, the battle was commemorated by issuing a Czechoslovak postage stamp with the illustrations of Jindřich Vlček and Bohumil Heinz. On the site of the battle a few memorials to the fallen soldiers were erected.
