= Carrier-Belleuse (disambiguation) =

Albert-Ernest Carrier-Belleuse (1824–1887) was a French sculptor.

Carrier-Belleuse may also refer to:

- Louis-Robert Carrier-Belleuse, French painter and sculptor, and son of Albert-Ernest
- Pierre Carrier-Belleuse (1851–1932), French painter and son of Albert-Ernest

== See also ==
- Belleuse
- Carrier (disambiguation)
