= Albert Dagnaux =

French painter

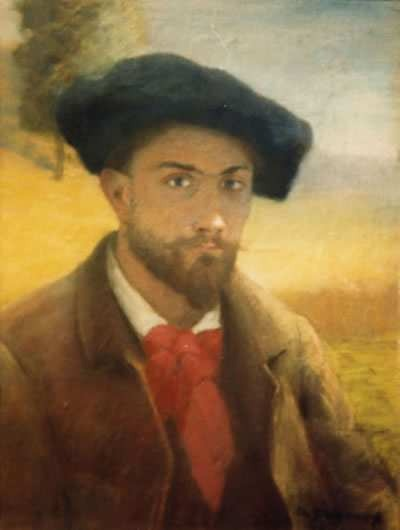
Self-portrait (1885)

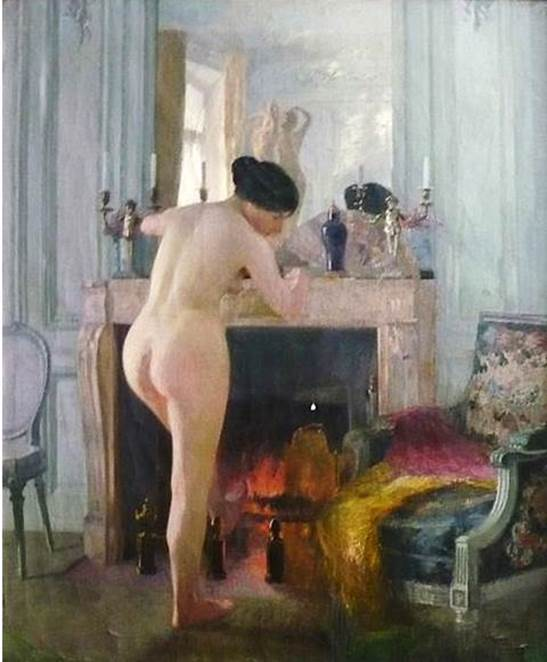
Woman Warming Herself (date unknown)

Albert Marie Adolphe Dagnaux (10 July 1861 in Paris – 22 November 1933 in Mantes-la-Jolie) was a French landscape, tableaux and figure painter.

== Biography ==
His father was the owner of a small restaurant, "Le Dagnaux", in the 6th arrondissement of Paris. He began his studies in 1878 at the École nationale supérieure des beaux-arts under Professor Ernest Victor Hareux. His first exhibit was in 1883, at the Salon, but he received no recognition.

In 1890, he left the Salon to join the Société Nationale des Beaux-Arts, founded by Jean-Louis-Ernest Meissonier. It was at that time that he began to receive positive critical attention. His first major success came with his tableau Avenue du Bois de Boulogne; Le Club des Pannés, in 1893. Another tableau, Le jardin du général aux Invalides, was presented at the Exposition Universelle (1900).

Among his other works are the three frescoes in the refectory of the Lycée Fénelon (Les Jeux de l'enfance et de la jeunesse, Le Martin-pêcheur, Le nid) and a large panorama representing the fifth appearance of the Virgin Mary to Bernadette Soubirous, produced under the direction of Pierre and Louis-Robert Carrier-Belleuse.

A street in Mantes-la-Jolie was named in his honor.
