= Carrier (surname) =

Carrier is a surname, and may refer to:

- Albert Carrier (1919–2002), Italian-American actor
- Alexandre Carrier (born 1996), Canadian ice hockey player
- Corey Carrier (born 1980), American child actor
- Darel Carrier (born 1940), American professional basketball player
- George F. Carrier (1918–2002), American mathematician and professor emeritus at Harvard University
- Jean-Baptiste Carrier (1756–1794), French Revolutionary
- Albert-Ernest Carrier de Belleuse (1824–1887), French sculptor
- Louis-Robert Carrier-Belleuse (1848–1913), French painter and sculptor
- Mark Carrier (wide receiver) (born 1965), American football player
- Mark Carrier (safety) (born 1968), American football player
- Richard Carrier (born 1969), American author
- Robert Carrier (chef) (1923–2006), American chef, restaurateur and cookery writer
- Robert Carrier (politician) (born 1941), Canadian politician
- Roch Carrier (born 1937), Canadian novelist and author
- Scott Carrier (born 1957), American author and radio producer
- William Carrier (born 1994), Canadian ice hockey player
- Willis Carrier (1876–1950), American inventor of air-conditioning

== See also ==
- Carrier (disambiguation)
- Cartier (disambiguation)
