= Panthéon de la Guerre =

Monumental painting by Pierre Carrier-Belleuse

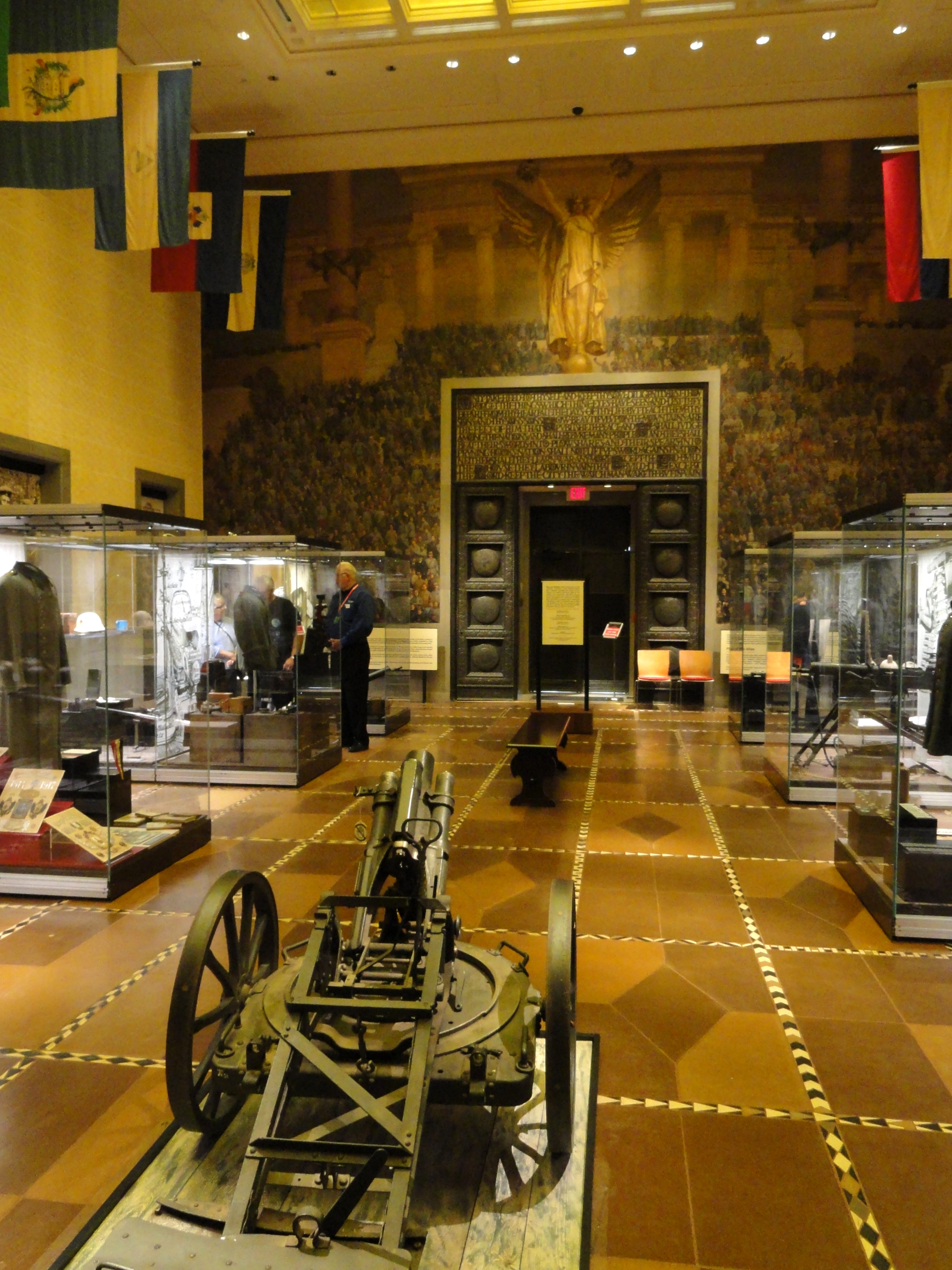
Figure of Victory from the Temple to Glory above a doorway at Memory Hall, Liberty Memorial, Kansas City, Missouri, with the staircase of heroes to either side

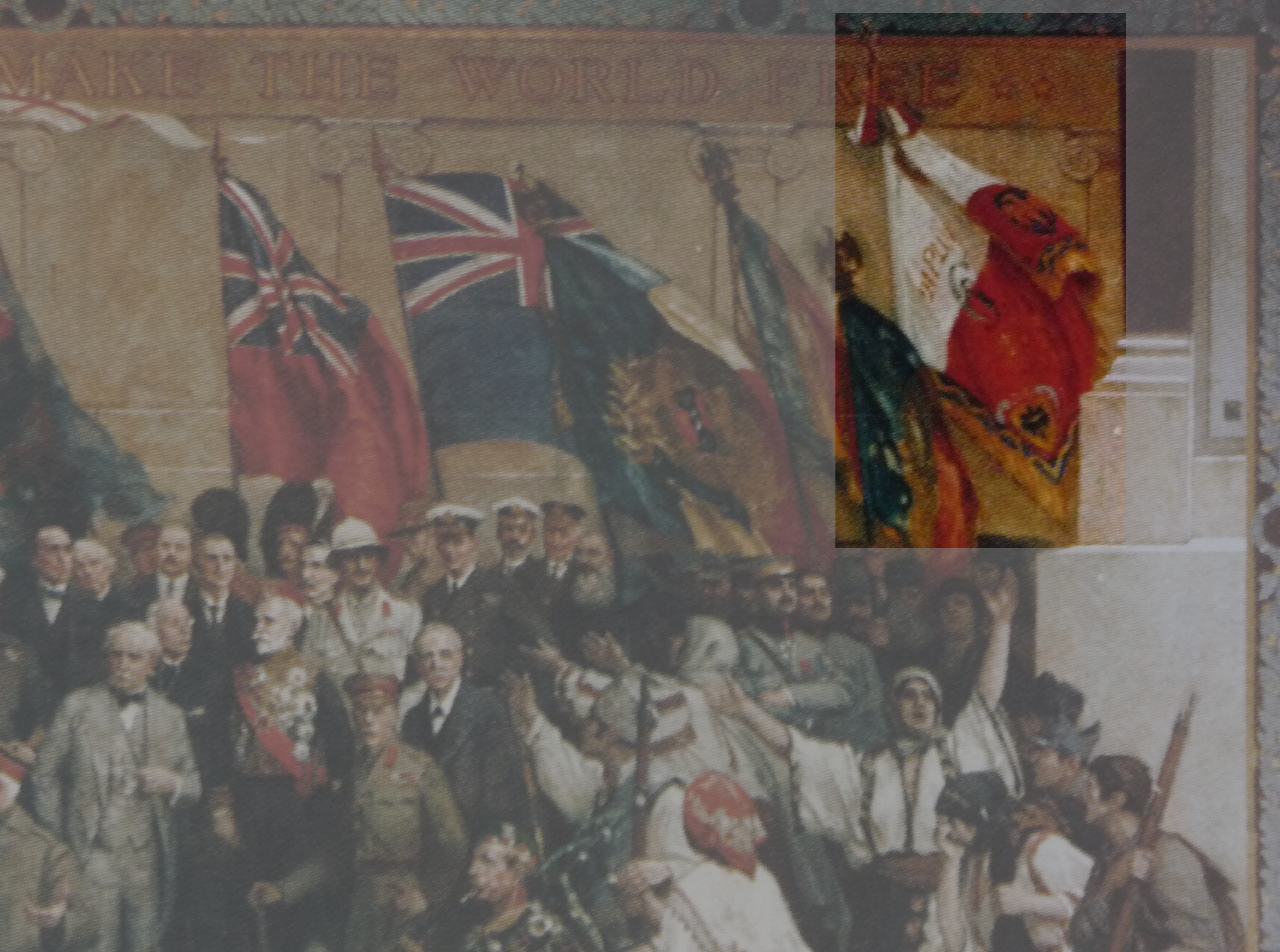
Flag of the Czechoslovak Legion in the Pantheon de la Guerre.

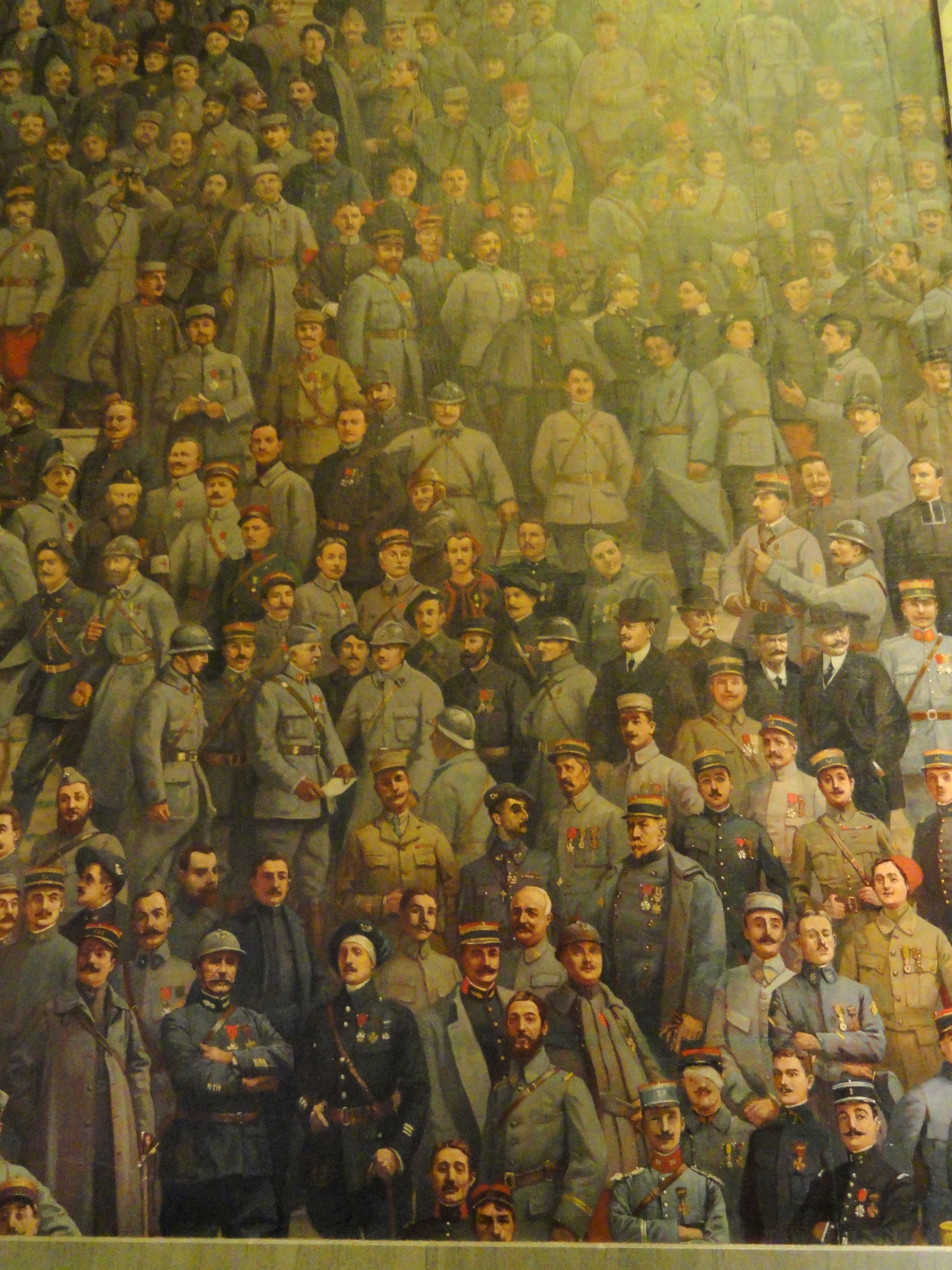
Detail from the staircase of French heroes

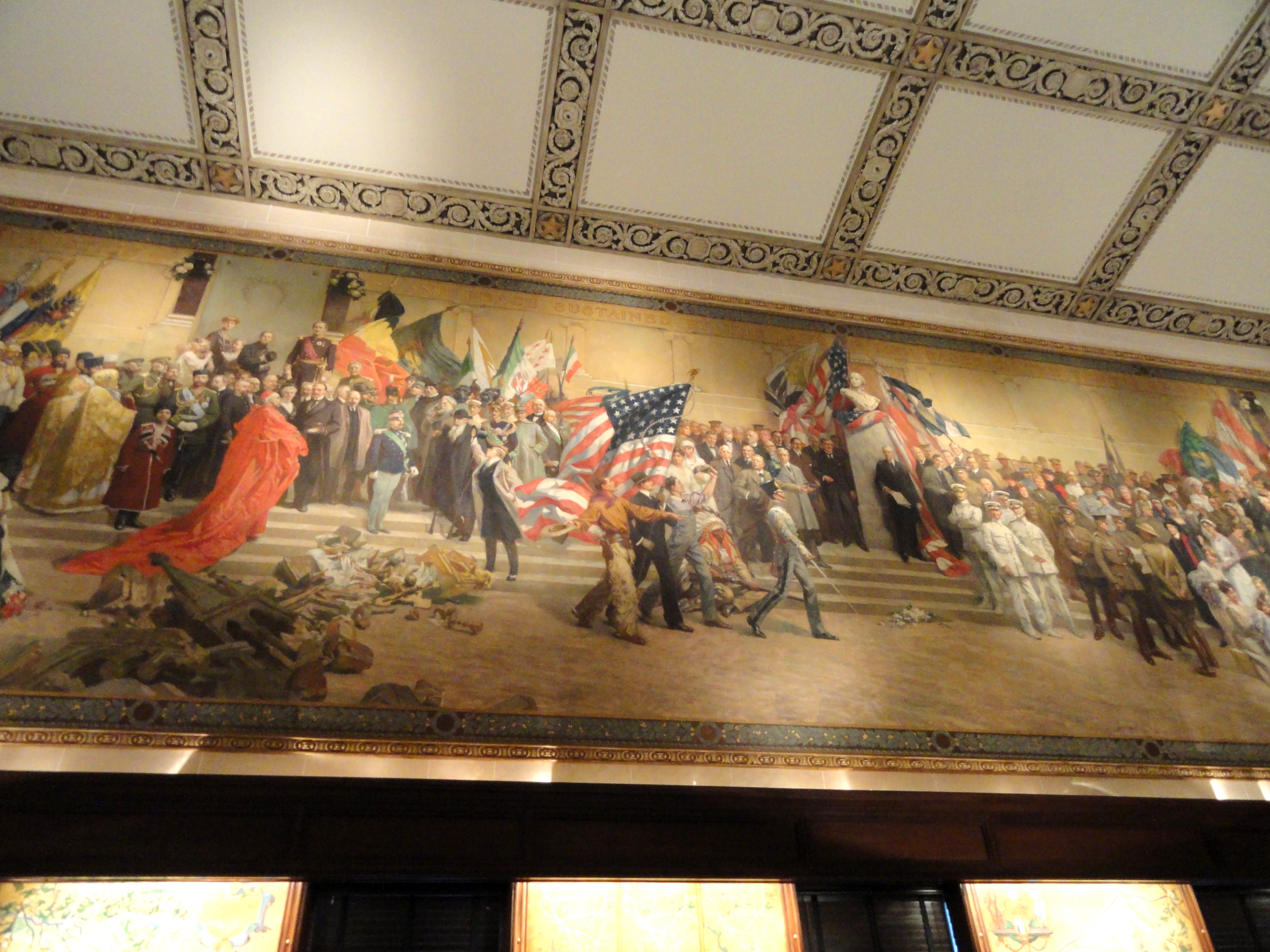
Section showing allies, now at Memory Hall, Liberty Memorial, Kansas City, Missouri

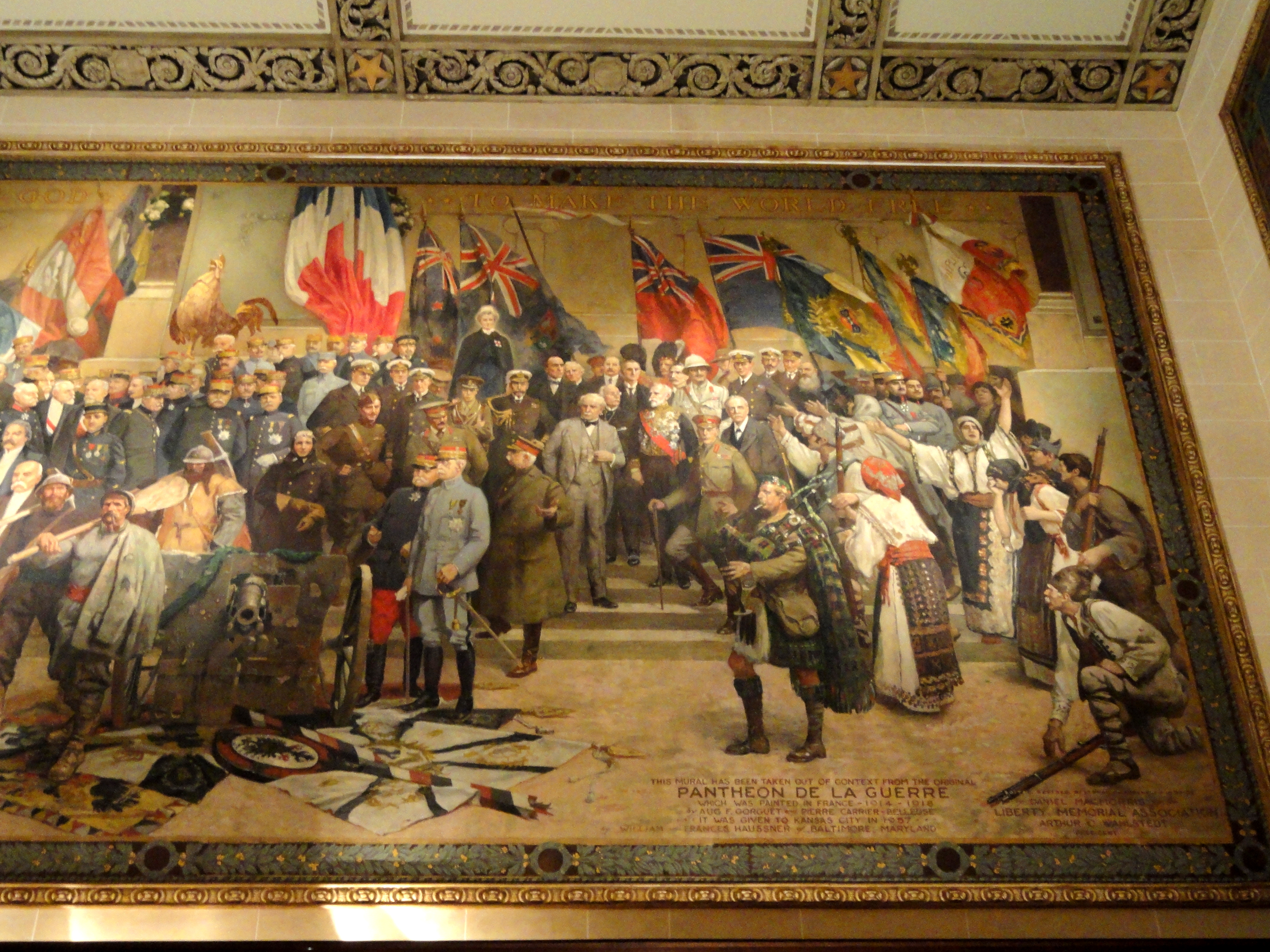
Section showing allies, now at Memory Hall, Liberty Memorial, Kansas City, Missouri

The Panthéon de la Guerre was a monumental artwork painted in Paris during the First World War, a circular panorama 402 feet (123 m) in circumference and 45 feet (14 m) high. It has been described as the largest painting in the world.

== Description ==
The painting included full-length portraits of around 6,000 wartime figures from France and its allies.

The centrepiece was a "Temple to Glory", with portraits of French figures crowding on a staircase of heroes, topped by a gold statue of Victory holding aloft a crown of laurels in each hand, on a plinth bearing the motto "Aux héros" ("to the heroes"). At the base of the staircase, French political and military leaders stood around a 75mm cannon. On the opposite side of the circular painting was a depiction of a war memorial, with four bronze poilus holding a coffin covered with the French flag on a plinth inscribed "Pro patria", and a single woman dressed in black weeping beside a wreath bearing the words "Aux héros ignorés" ("to the forgotten heroes")

National groups of figures from the allied nations lined the painting to either side, four Europeans allies (The United Kingdom, Belgium, Italy, Portugal) on one side and 19 others (including the US, Greece, Latin America, Serbia, Montenegro, Tsarist Russia, Romania and Japan) on the other. The figures were mostly men, but also some female nurses, nuns and spies, such as Edith Cavell, Louise de Bettignies and Émilienne Moreau. The work also depicted some French cuirassiers, goumiers (troops from Morocco), and veterans ("péperes"), and included a continuous topographical landscape depicting the battlefields of France and Belgium from the North Sea to Switzerland. A section comprising representatives from Asian nations - including men of Britain's Chinese Labour Corps employed behind the western front - was greatly reduced to make way for by American figures when the US entered the war.

While Czechoslovakia did not exist before World War I, during the war the Czechoslovak Legion recruited men to fight with the Allies on three fronts: France, Italy, and Russia. The Czechoslovak Legion in Russia was composed mostly of POWs from the Austro-Hungarian Army. On the far right of the main panel of the painting, the last flag shown is of the Czechoslovak Legion. The Legion's flag generally consisted of a white bar over a red bar with coats of arms of Bohemia, Moravia, Silesia and Slovakia in the corners and a crown with garlands in the center or the initials "C S" intertwined as seen here in the detail from the painting and photo of the Legion in France posing with their flag. This stylized "C S" symbol was used extensively throughout Czechoslovakia during the first republic, 1918 - 1939.

== History in Paris ==
Work on the painting began in September 1914, after the Battle of the Marne, coordinated by French artists Pierre Carrier-Belleuse and Auguste François-Marie Gorguet, with contributions from around 130 artists. The work was undertaken as a private commercial venture, with state support.

The completed painting was displayed in Paris in a specially built building next to the Hôtel des Invalides, and inaugurated by the French President Raymond Poincaré in October 1918. Visitors approached along dark corridors to a central viewing platform. It was visited by 3 million people between 1918 and 1927.

== Display in US ==
The painting was acquired by US businessmen in 1927 and exported to New York, where it was displayed at Madison Square Garden. It was seen there by one million visitors in 8 weeks. Some small changes were made to make the work more attractive to a US audience: Colonel Edward M. House (by then a politician) was painted out and replaced by the US ambassador to France, Myron T. Herrick; an African-American soldier was also added.

The work went on a tour of the United States, displayed at the Washington Bicentennial Fair in Washington DC in 1932, at the Century of Progress exhibition in Chicago in 1933-34, at the Great Lakes Exposition at Cleveland, Ohio in 1936-37, and the Golden Gate International Exposition in San Francisco in 1940. It went into storage in 1940, and was acquired by restaurant entrepreneur William Haussner for $3,400.

== Liberty Memorial, Kansas City, Missouri ==
Haussner donated the work to Leroy Daniel MacMorris in 1956 to be adapted for display at Memory Hall in the Liberty Memorial in Kansas City, Missouri. MacMorris greatly reduced the size of the work and modified it to emphasize the US contribution to the First World War. Only 7 percent of the original work was retained, and large French sections were left out. The reconfigured work has been described as a "Reader's Digest" version, in a Cold War US nationalist context. MacMorris also modified some unrecognisable figures in the US delegations to represent later US figures, such as Presidents Franklin Delano Roosevelt and Harry S. Truman (a First World War veteran, and Missouri native). Colonel House was added back, and MacMorris also added portraits of Carrier-Belleuse and Gorguet. The bouquet of flowers previously painted in at the feet of Edith Cavell was placed in front of Woodrow Wilson. The lone surviving Chinese labourer was also painted out.

Other fragments of the original painting have survived. Two 10 × 16 feet (3.0 × 4.9 m) fragments were displayed in Haussner's Restaurant in Baltimore until 1999, and were then sold. The building that housed the work in Paris was destroyed in 1960.

== See also ==
- Atlanta Cyclorama & Civil War Museum
- Gettysburg Cyclorama
