= Lycée Fénelon, Paris =

French school in Paris

Coordinates: 48°51′11.35″N 02°20′25.38″E

Lycée Fénelon
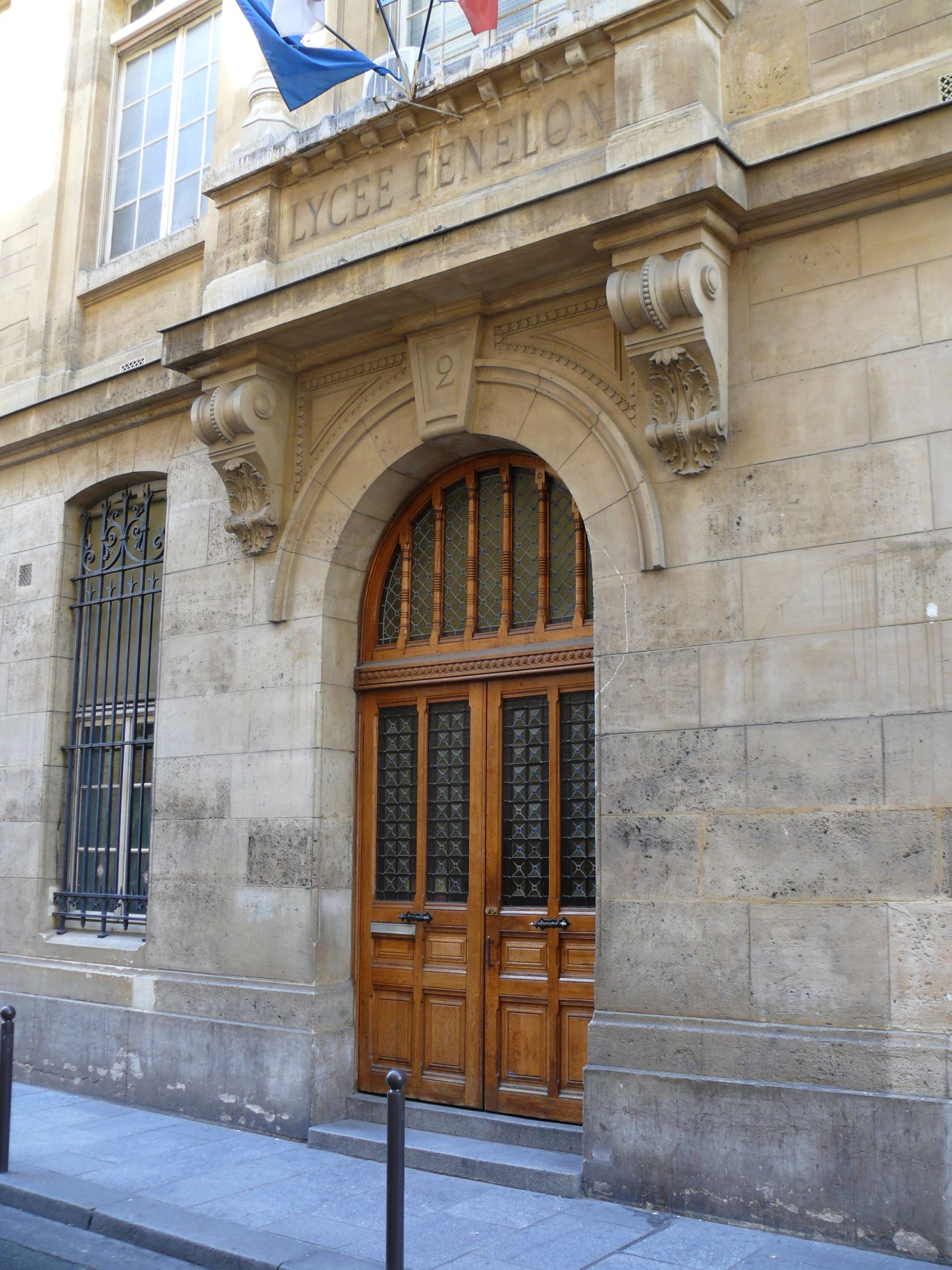
- Main entrance
- Students: 1200
- Location: Paris, Île-de-France, France

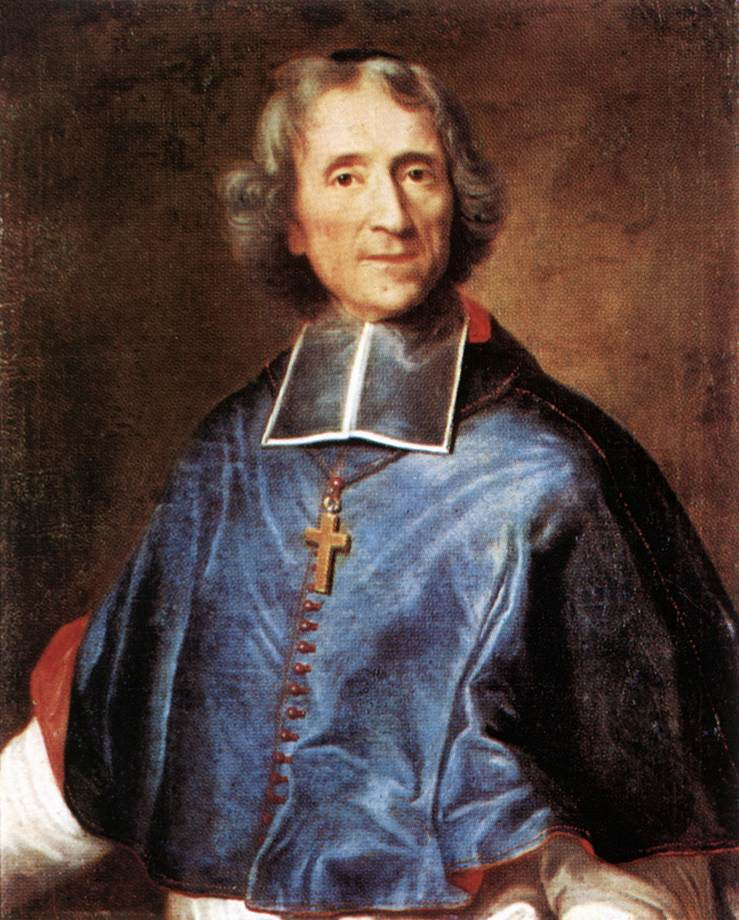
Portrait of Archbishop François Fénelon in 1713, by Joseph Vivien.

The Lycée Fénelon is an academic institution located in the 6th arrondissement of Paris, in the Latin Quarter. Founded after 1883, it was named in honor of François Fénelon, a French theologian and writer (1651–1715) who promoted women's education, notably in his "Traité de l'éducation des filles".

The school was founded in 1892, in a building dating from the 17th century. It was initially created as the first high school for girls in Paris, to prepare female students to the École normale supérieure de jeunes filles. It later became coed in 1973 for CPGE classes, and in 1979 for high schoolers.

Like other lycées in France, Fénelon functions as an ordinary high school for years 10–12, but also as an institute to teach the "post-bac" (≈undergraduate) academic programs known as Classe préparatoire aux grandes écoles (a.k.a. CPGE, or prépas). Fénelon is in fact regarded as one of France's most prestigious and most competitive institutions in this domain. In particular, its Humanities (khâgne) students rank just behind Lycées Henri IV and Louis-Le-Grand in their rates of success in the annual entrance competition to ENS ("Concours").

== History ==
In the 18th century, the building that now houses the lycée was a luxury mansion, the Hôtel de Villayer, where Enlightenment scientists met. Its last owner sold it to the State in 1883, which made it the first high school for young girls in Paris. While most of the new boys' high schools of the time were built from scratch, giving rise to buildings with a monumental style, the girls' high schools, like the Lycée Fénelon, often reinvested in old buildings. Moreover, the location of this first female high school in the capital is not insignificant, near the Latin Quarter, where the historic high schools of Paris are concentrated.

Initially, the Lycée Fénelon prepared girls to enter the École normale supérieure de jeunes filles located in Sèvres until 1940, and which merged with that of the rue d'Ulm (originally for boys) in 1985.

The Société des Agrégées was founded there in 1920. A professor at Fénelon, Élisabeth Butiaux became its first president.

== Notable alumni ==
- Louise Bourgeois
- Nathalie Sarraute
- Olivier Py
- Dominique Aury
- Simone Weil
- Maryse Condé
- Assia Djebar
- Charlotte Casiraghi
- Jonathan Littell
- Maxence Caron
- Simone de Beauvoir
- Louis Garrel
- Chiara Mastroianni
- Melvil Poupaud
- Ginette Mathiot
- Denise Bonal
- Juliette Benzoni
- Hélène Solomon-Langevin
- Geneviève Pastre
- Françoise Héritier
- Francesca Yvonne Caroutch
- Michèle Battut
- Philippe Marland
- Nicolas Hulot
- Caroline of Monaco
- Denis Podalydès
- Hakim Karoui
- Jul
- Gisèle Vienne
- Katell Quillévéré
- Leïla Slimani
- Christine and the Queens

== Buildings ==
The teachers room is registered as a French Monument historique.

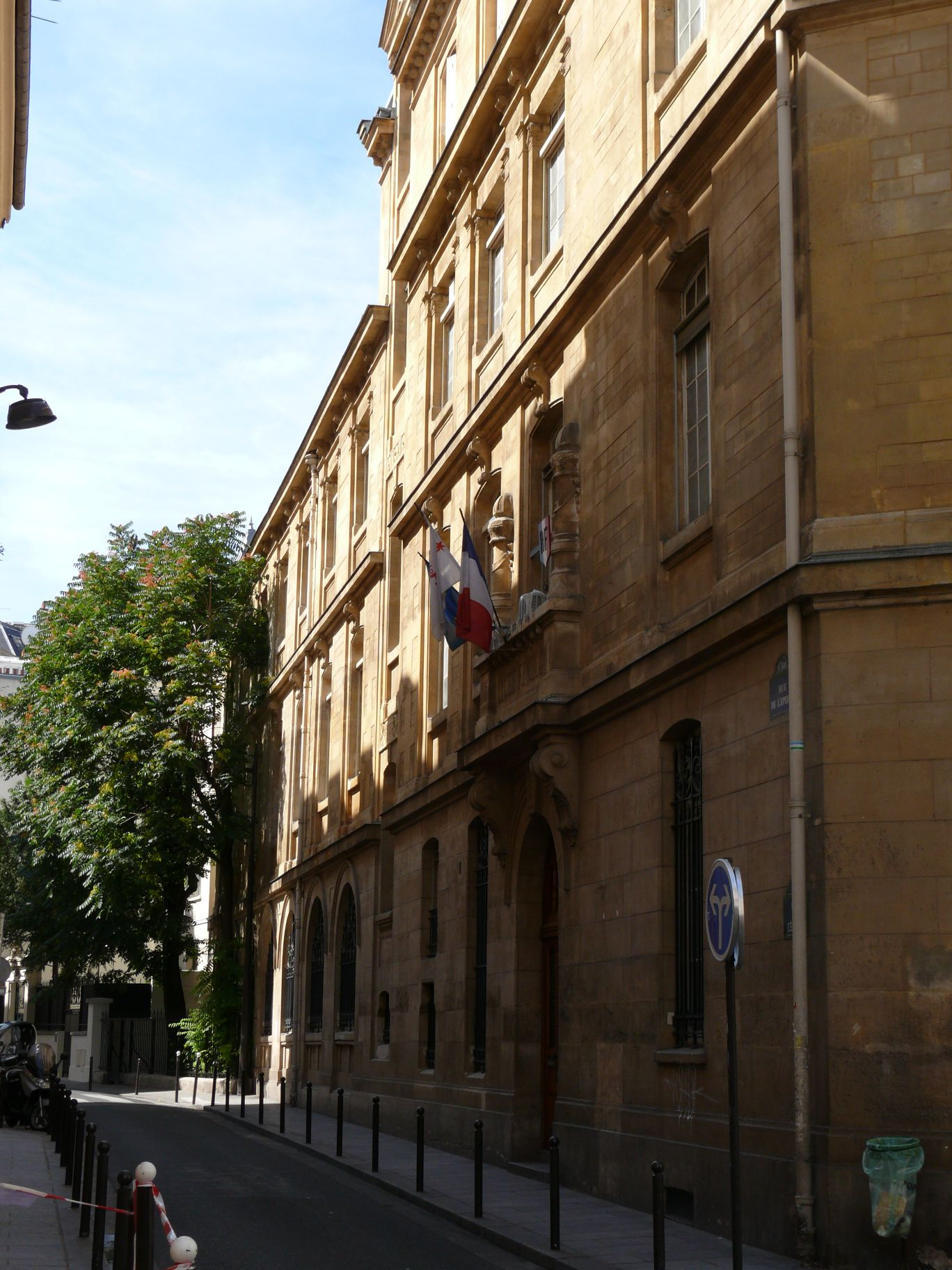
The main building from the street

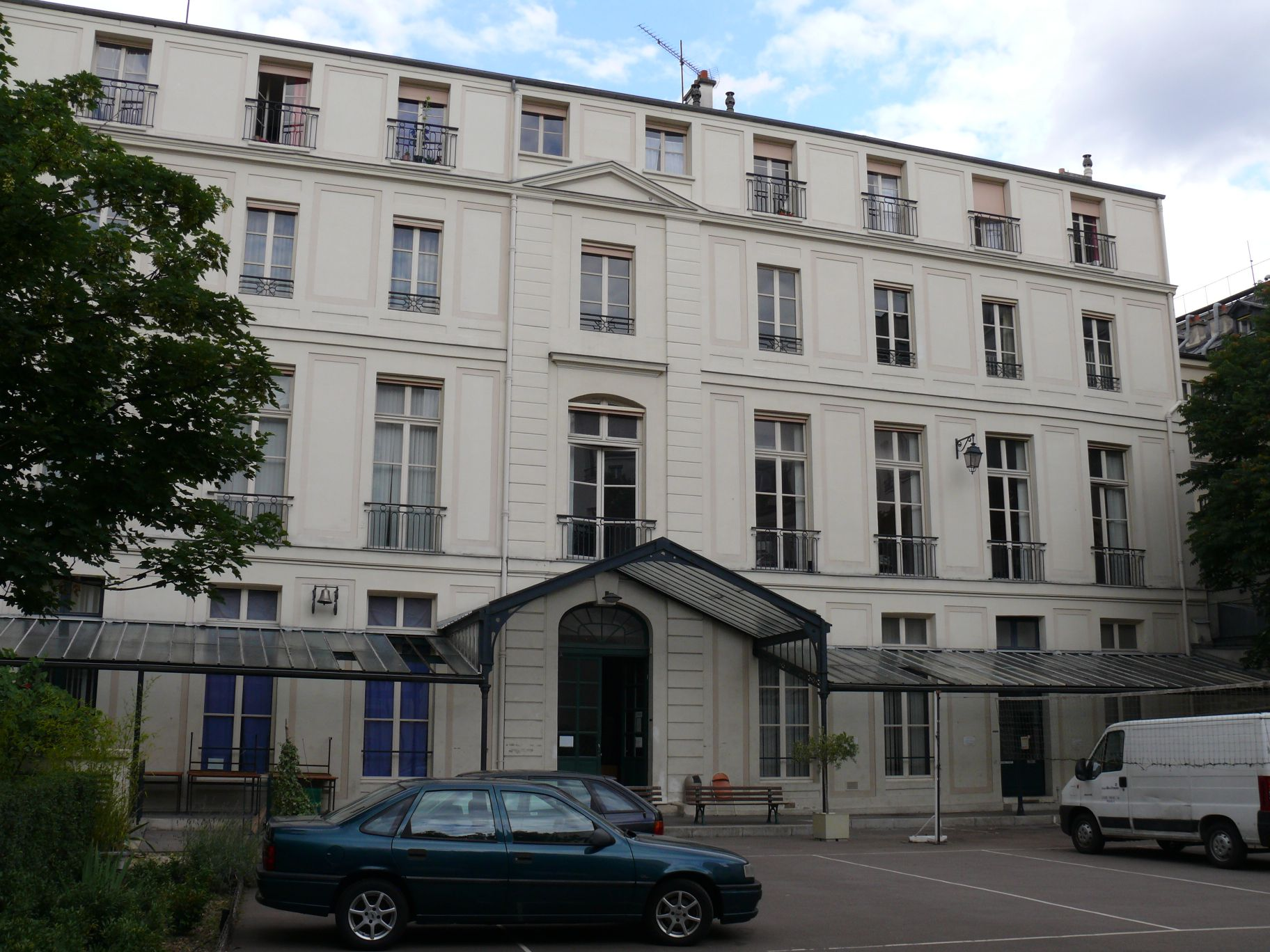
The main building from the backyard

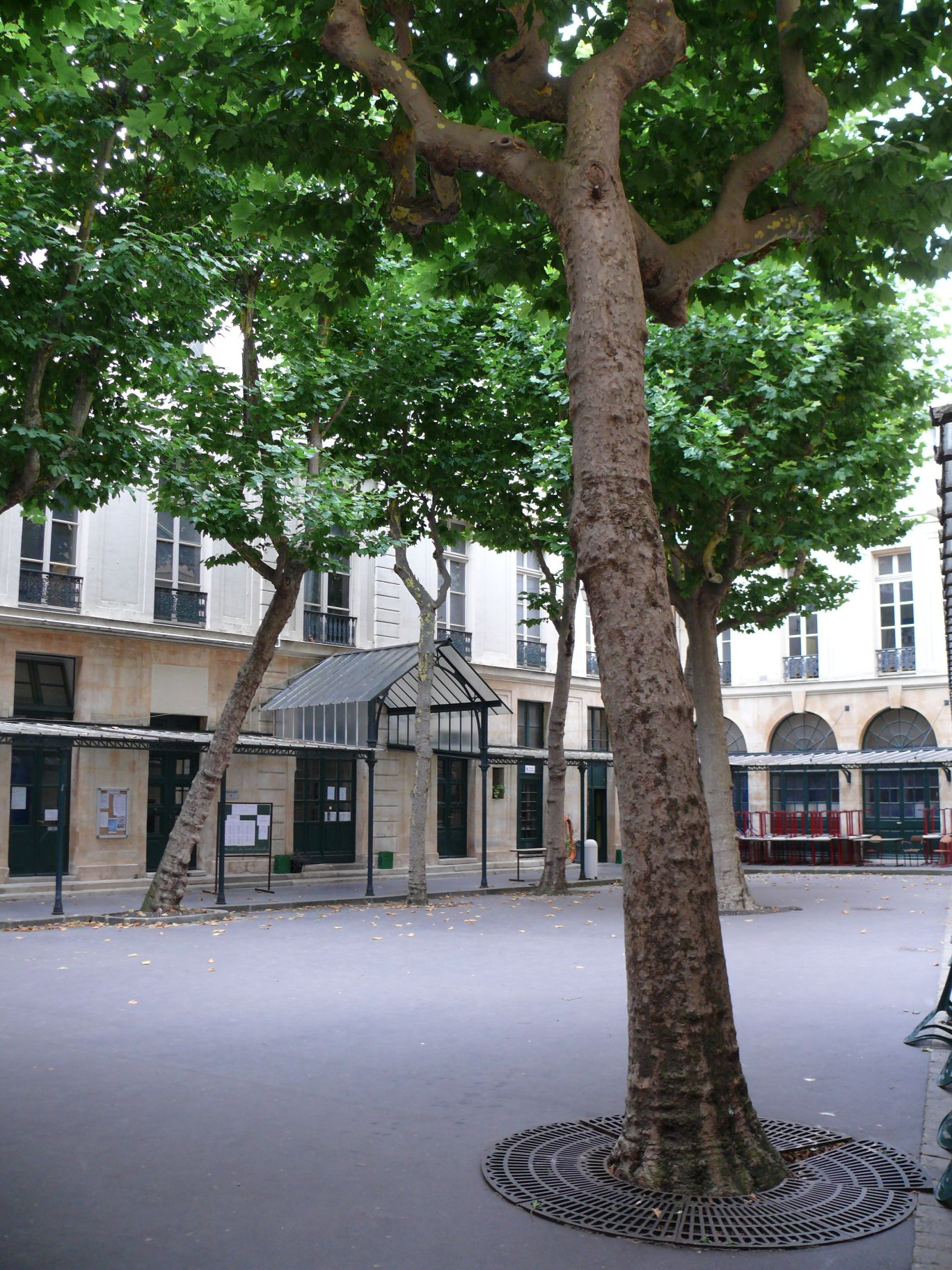
The playground

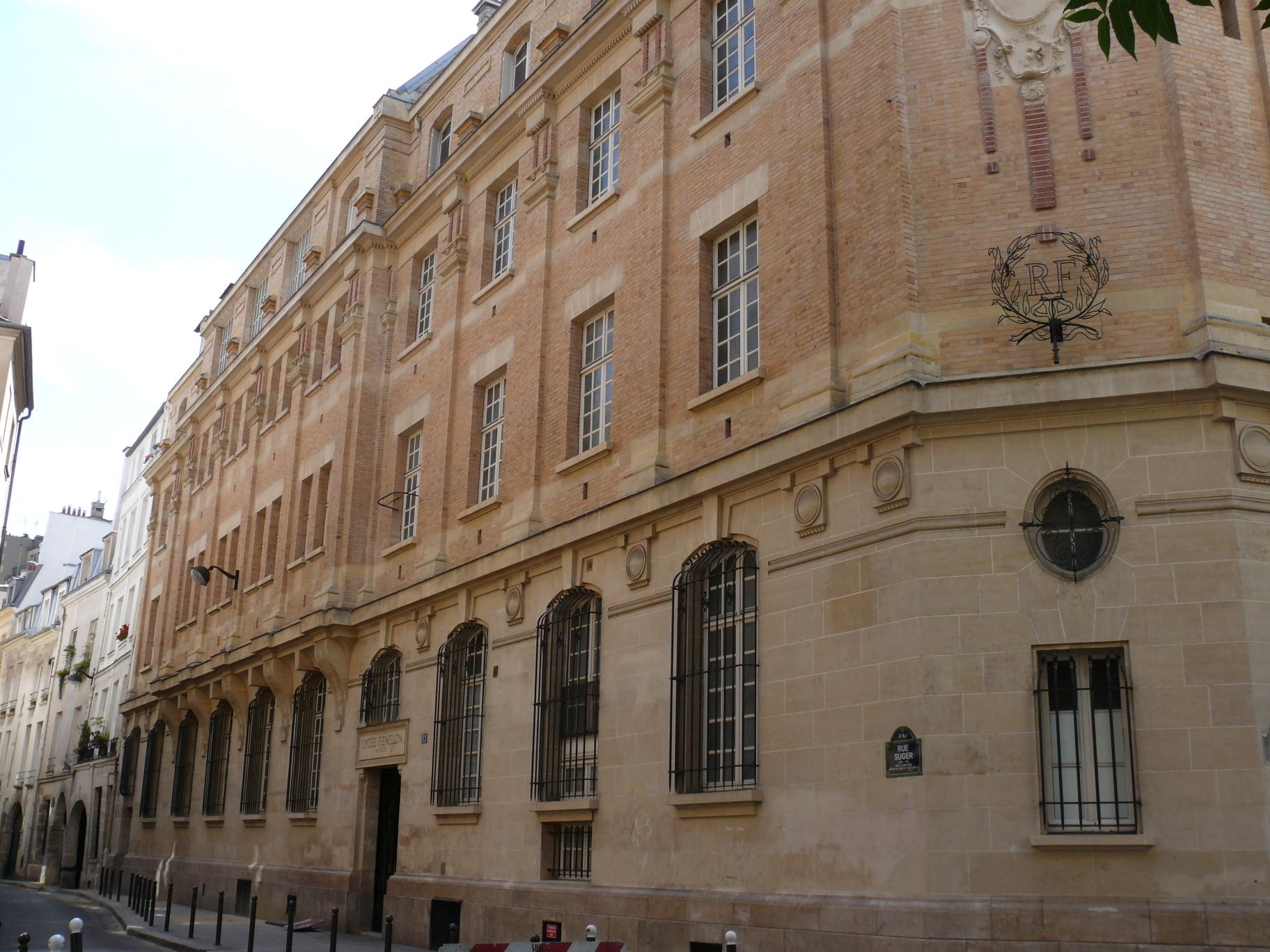
The second building

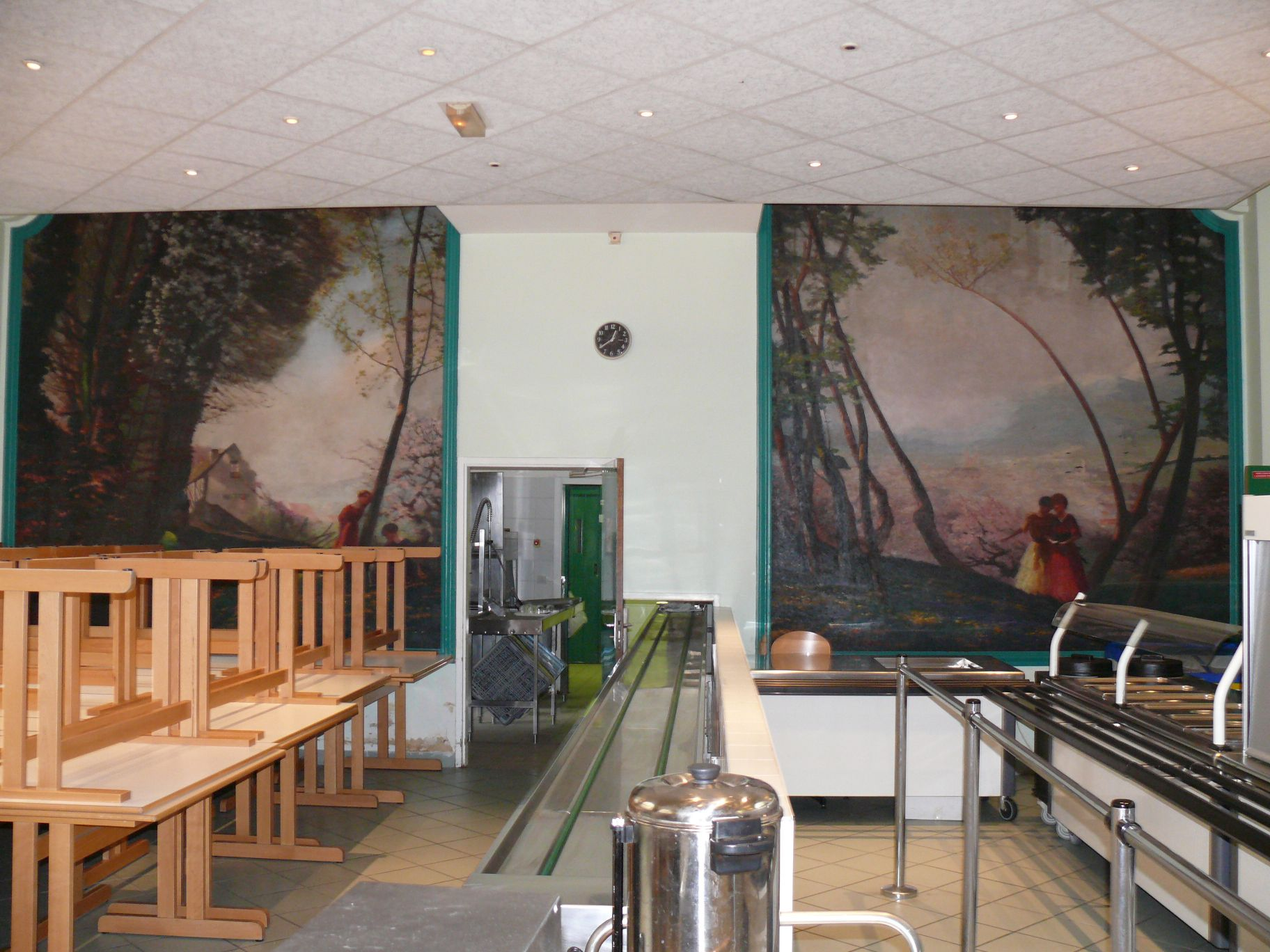
The refectory and its frescoes, painted by Albert Dagnaux

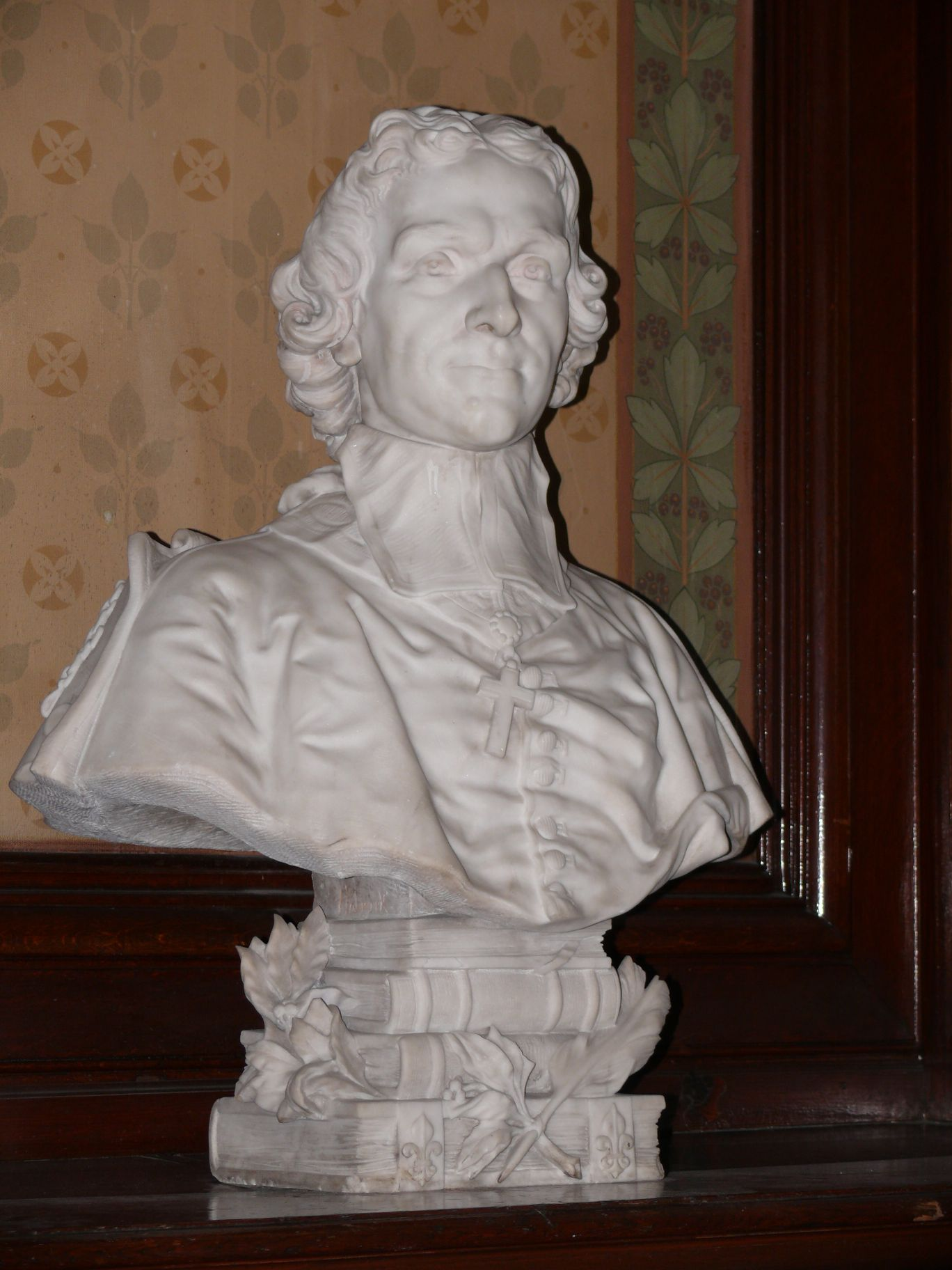
Bust of Fénelon in the parlor

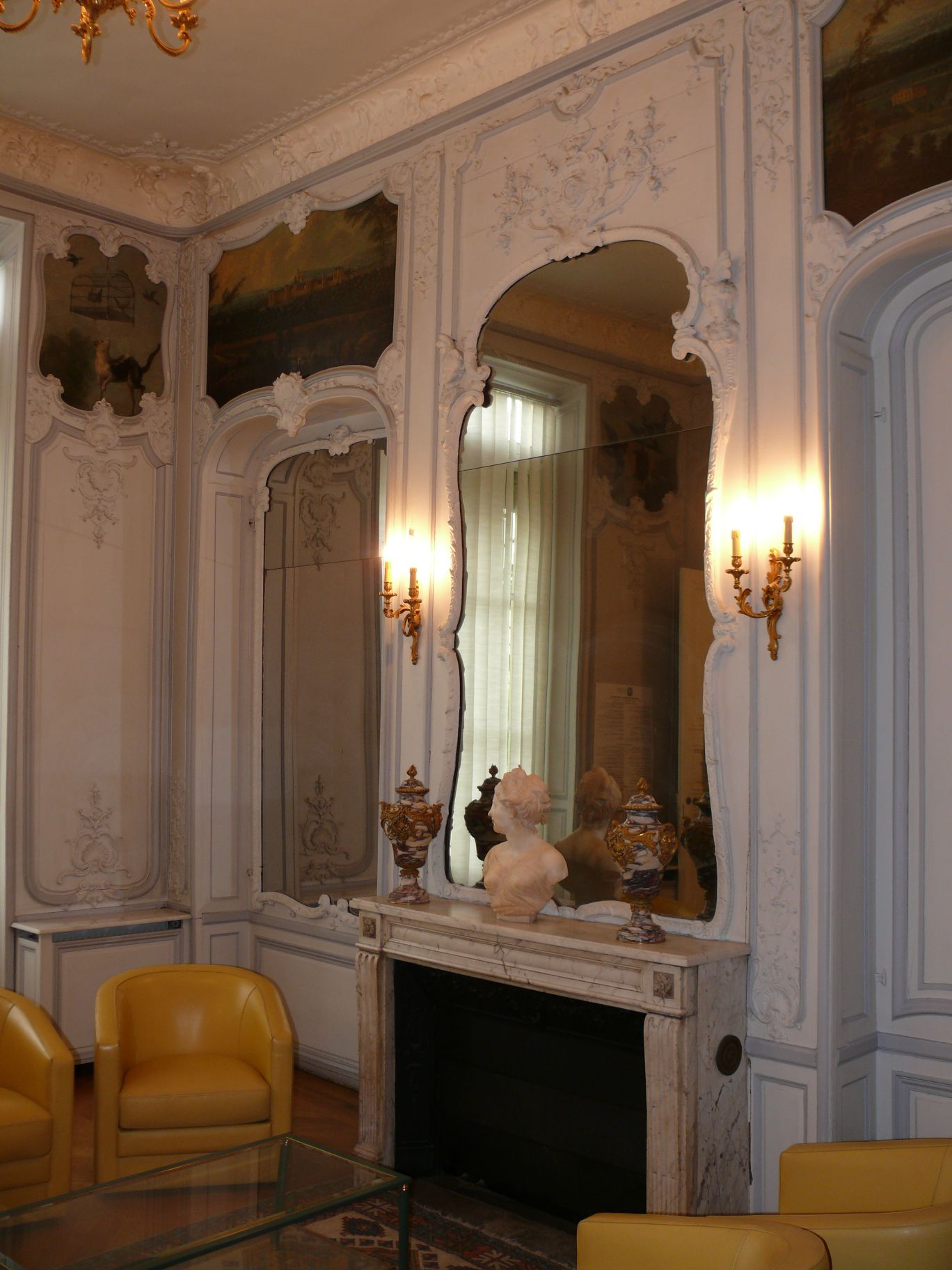
The teachers room
