= Cartier =

Cartier may refer to:

== People ==
- Cartier (surname), a surname (including a list of people with the name)
- Cartier Martin (born 1984), American basketball player

== Places ==
- Cartier Island, an island north-west of Australia that is part of Australia's Northern Territory
- Rural Municipality of Cartier, Manitoba
- Cartier, Ontario, a small town in Northern Ontario
- Cartier (electoral district), Quebec
- Mount Cartier, a mountain in British Columbia

== Transportation ==
- Cartier Railway, Quebec, Canada
- Cartier station (Montreal Metro), a subway station in Laval, Quebec, Canada
- Cartier station (Ontario), a train station in Cartier, Ontario, Canada
- De Cartier (Charleroi Metro), a subway station in Charleroi, Belgium

== Other uses ==
- Cartier (brand), a French luxury brand in jewellery and watches
- Cartier Field, Indiana
- Cartier (typeface)
  - Cartier Book
- HMCS Cartier, a surveying ship
- "Cartier", a song by Bazzi from the album Cosmic
- Cartier divisor in algebraic geometry

== See also ==
- Port-Cartier, Quebec
- Cartier Racing Award, for horseracing
- The Cartier Project, a novel by Miha Mazzini
- Fondation Cartier pour l'Art Contemporain (Cartier Foundation for Contemporary Art)
- Macdonald-Cartier (disambiguation)
- Chartier (disambiguation)
- Carter (disambiguation)
