= Carrier =

Carrier may refer to:

== Entertainment ==
- Carrier (album), a 2013 album by The Dodos
- Carrier (board game), a South Pacific World War II board game
- Carrier (TV series), a ten-part documentary miniseries that aired on PBS in April 2008
- Carrier (video game), a 2000 video game for the Sega Dreamcast
- Carriers (film), a 2009 post-apocalyptic horror film
- The Carrier (band), an American melodic hardcore band
- The Carrier, spaceship home to the Authority, a team of comic superheroes
- Carrier (podcast), a podcast produced by QCode and starring Cynthia Erivo

== Science ==
- Carrier protein, a protein that facilitates the transport of another molecule
- Disease carrier (disambiguation), multiple uses in medicine
- Carrier, in radioanalytical chemistry, a dilutent used to simplify radioanalytical separations
- Charge carrier, particles that carry electric charges in electrical conductors

== Technology ==
- Aircraft carrier, a warship primarily hosting fixed-wing aircraft
- Carrier recovery in telecommunications
- Carrier signal, a waveform suitable for modulation by an information-bearing signal
- Carrier telephony, an analog multiplexing technique used in early telephone systems
- Helicopter carrier, a warship primarily hosting helicopters
- Universal Carrier, a tracked vehicle
- Wireless carrier, an organization that operates a wireless network for mobile phones
- Information carrier or substrate, the image in a photographic layer

== Other ==
- An airline
- Carrier, Oklahoma, a town in Garfield County, Oklahoma
- Carrier (surname), a surname and list of people with the name
- Carrier Global, air conditioning and commercial refrigeration manufacturing company
- Carrier language, the Athabaskan language of the Dakelh people
- Carrier pigeon, a dove trained to transport messages
- Common carrier, an organization that transports a product or service
- JMA Wireless Dome, formerly known as the Carrier Dome, in Syracuse, New York
- Mail carrier, a postal worker
- another name for a Porter, someone who manually transports supplies and equipment.

== See also ==
- Pet carrier
