= Equestrian monument to General Manuel Belgrano =

Coordinates: 34.6084°S 58.3712°W

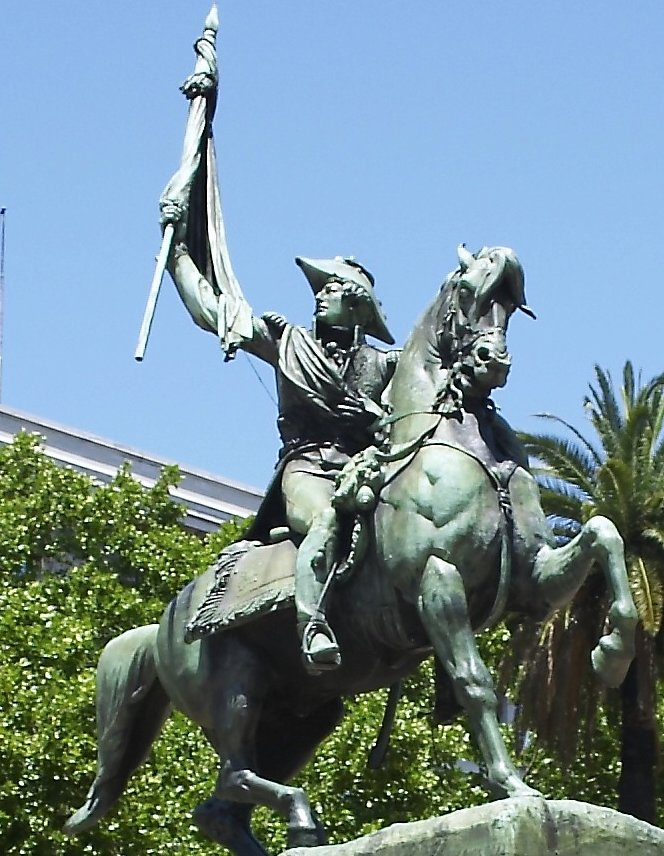
Monument of Manuel Belgrano.

The Equestrian monument to General Manuel Belgrano is a landmark of Buenos Aires, Argentina. It is located at Plaza de Mayo, in front of the Casa Rosada. It depicts General Manuel Belgrano holding the Flag of Argentina, and it is made of bronze over a pedestal of granite.

== History ==
In 1870 generals Bartolomé Mitre, Enrique Martínez and Manuel José Guerrico appointed a commission with the task of making a monument for Manuel Belgrano. This was requested to the French sculptor Louis-Robert Carrier-Belleuse, who would make the statue of Belgrano, and Manuel de Santa Coloma, who designed the horse. It was finished in 1872 and moved to Buenos Aires, where it was dedicated on September 24, 1873, at an anniversary of the Battle of Tucumán. More than 20,000 people were present at the ceremony, and the Argentine National Anthem was played at Teatro Colón that night.

The statue joined the existing obelisk in the Plaza de Mayo, which has existed in some form since 1811. The square is a focal point for celebrations relating to the birth of the independent state of Argentina. The statue was funded by public subscription. The American Architect in 1891 described the statue as "so fine, it is hard to believe it is the work of Carrier-Belleuse, so different is it from that sculptor's usual work" and ascribed the difference to the involvement of an unknown different sculptor.

During the government of Marcelo Torcuato de Alvear (1922-1928) it was thought that the base was too low, so it was raised. During the work the monument was rotated as well, and instead of watching towards to Buenos Aires Cabildo it was made to look to the North, so that it didn't show his back to the Casa Rosada.

== Gallery ==
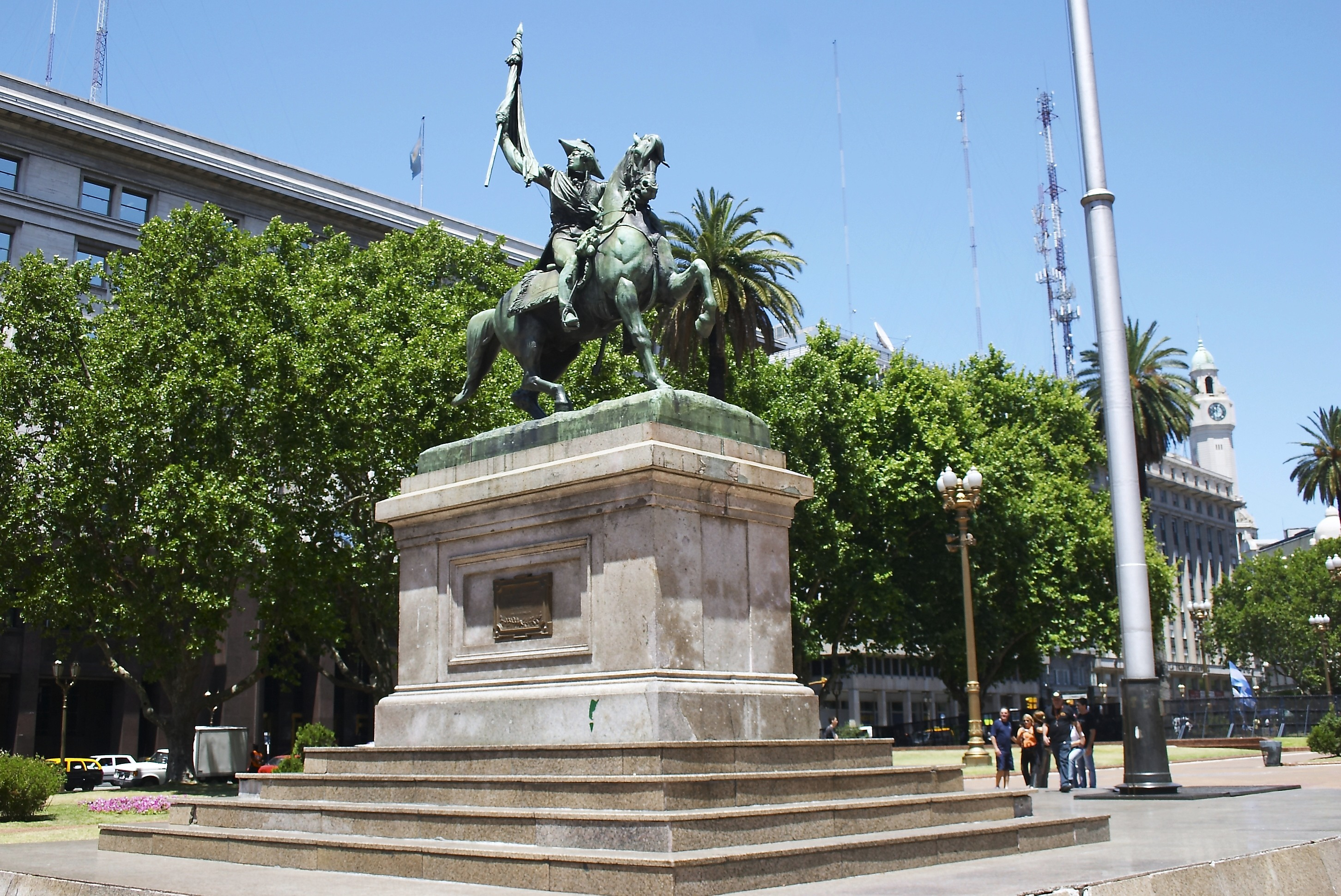

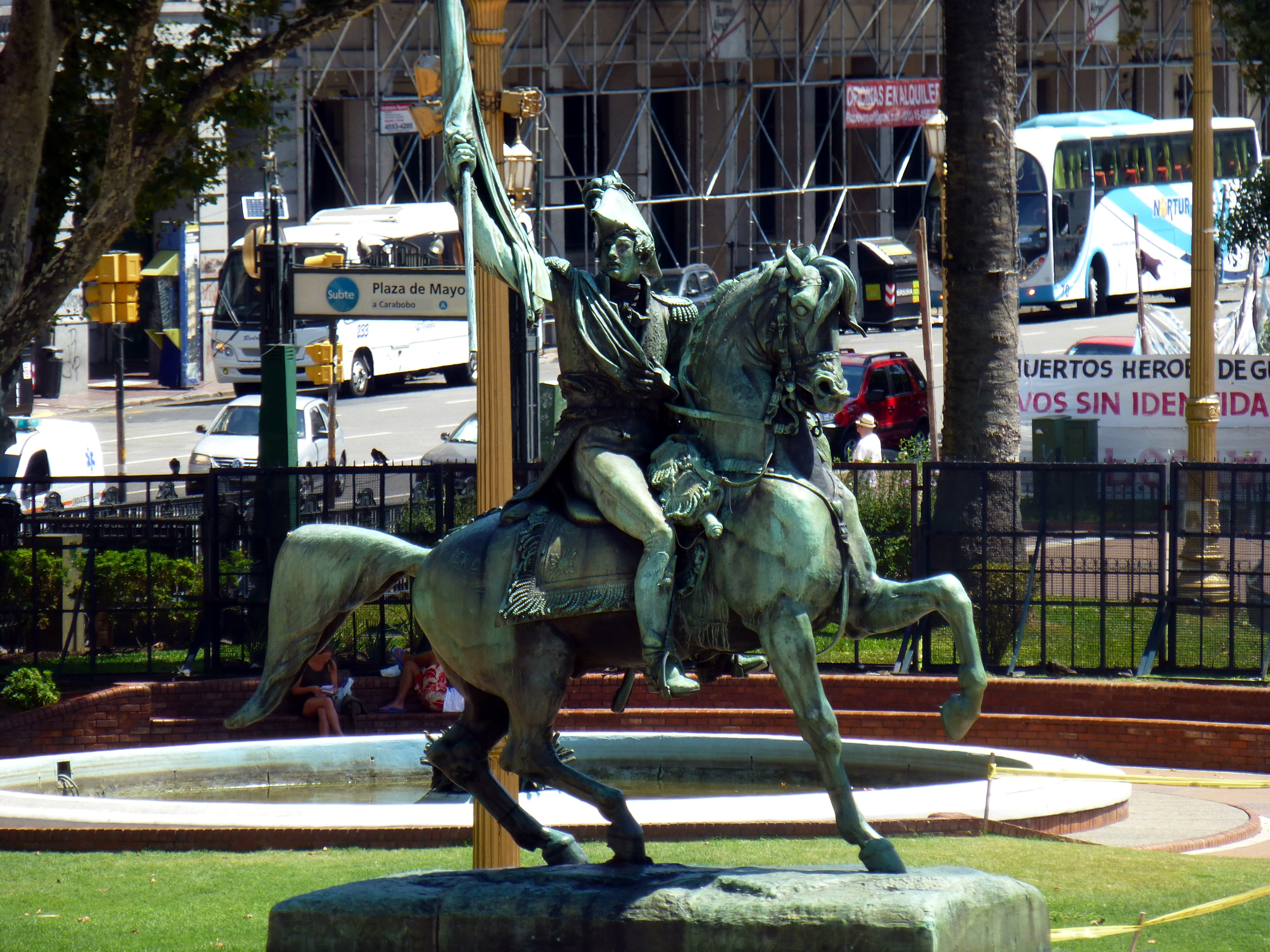

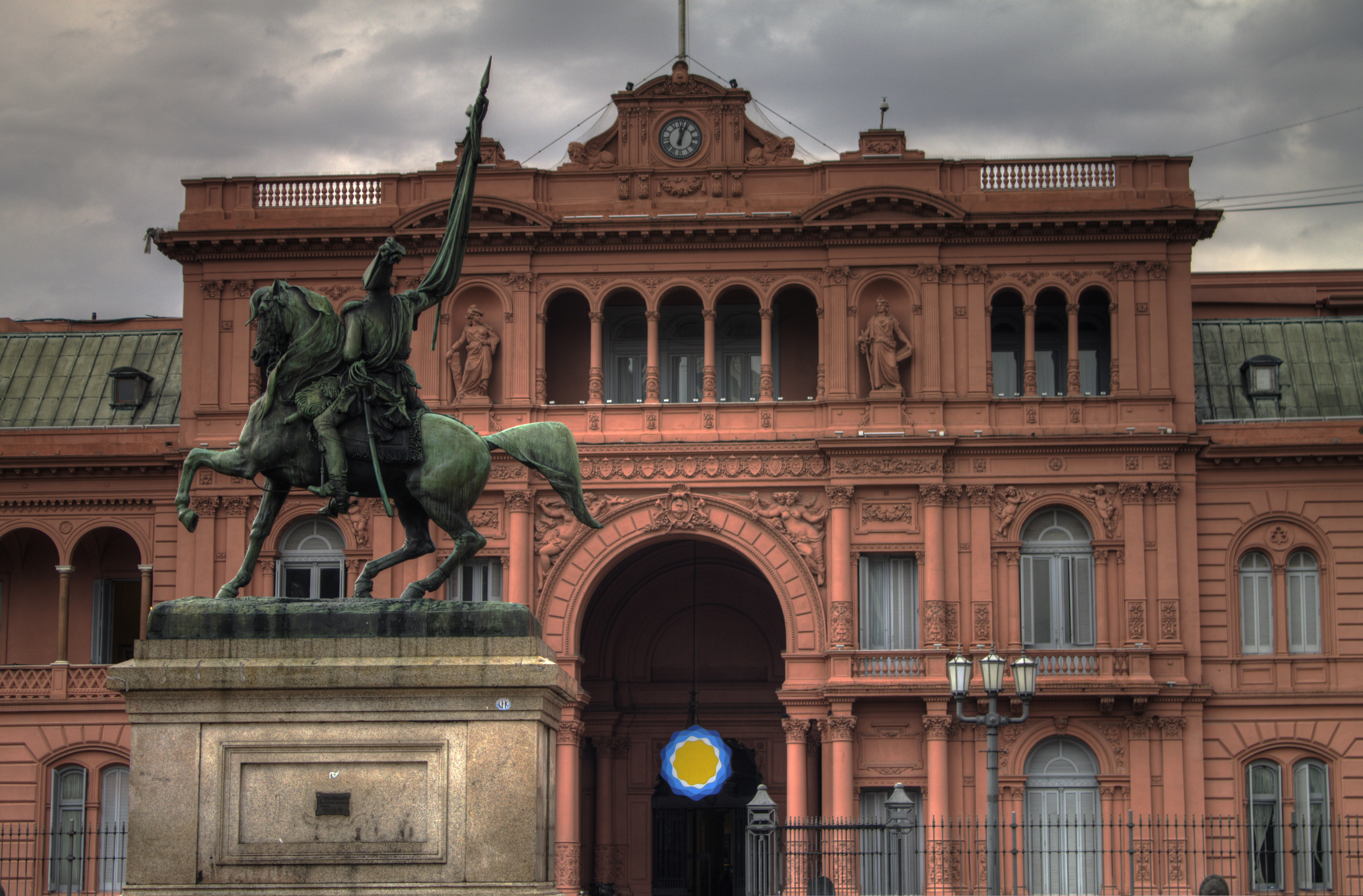

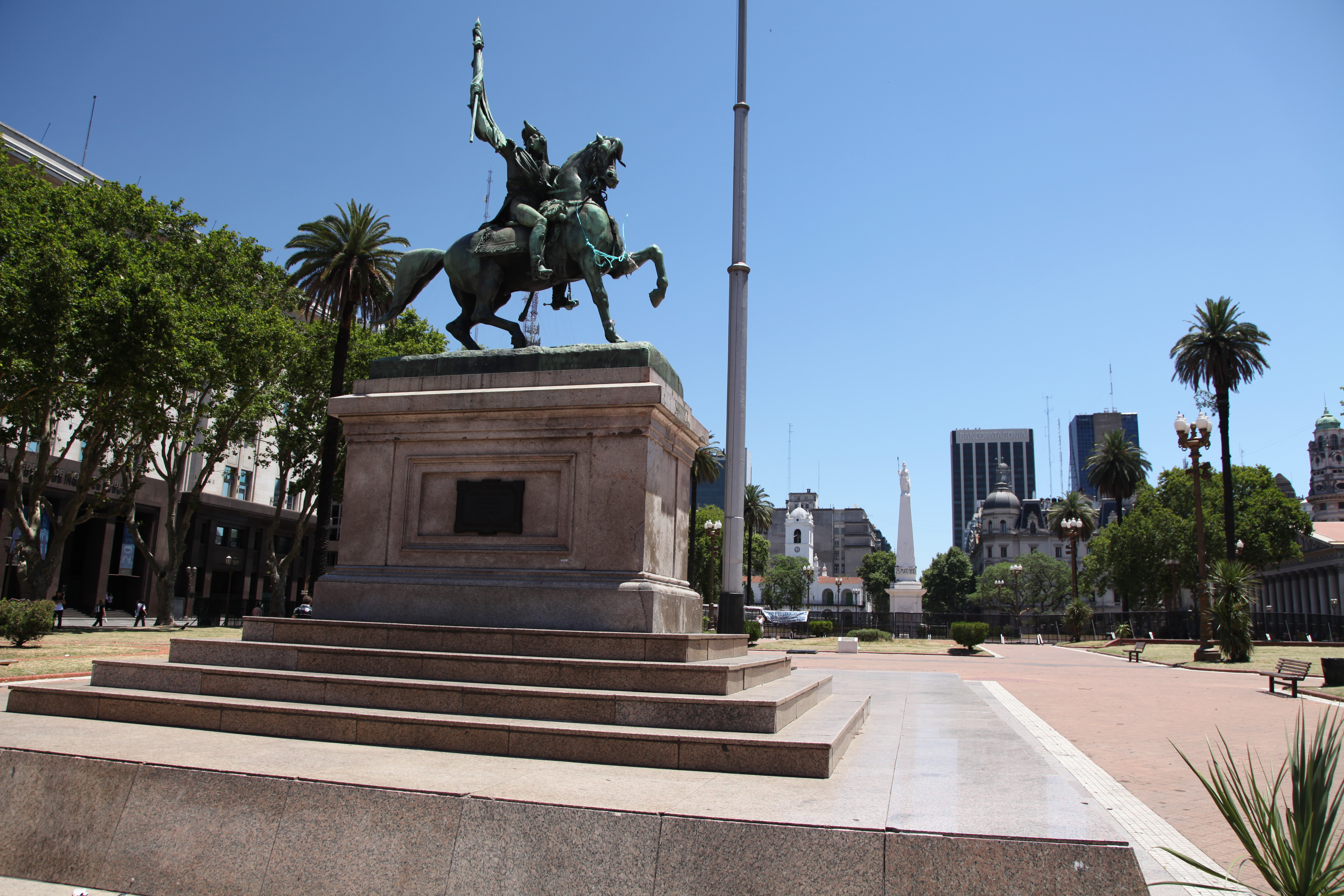

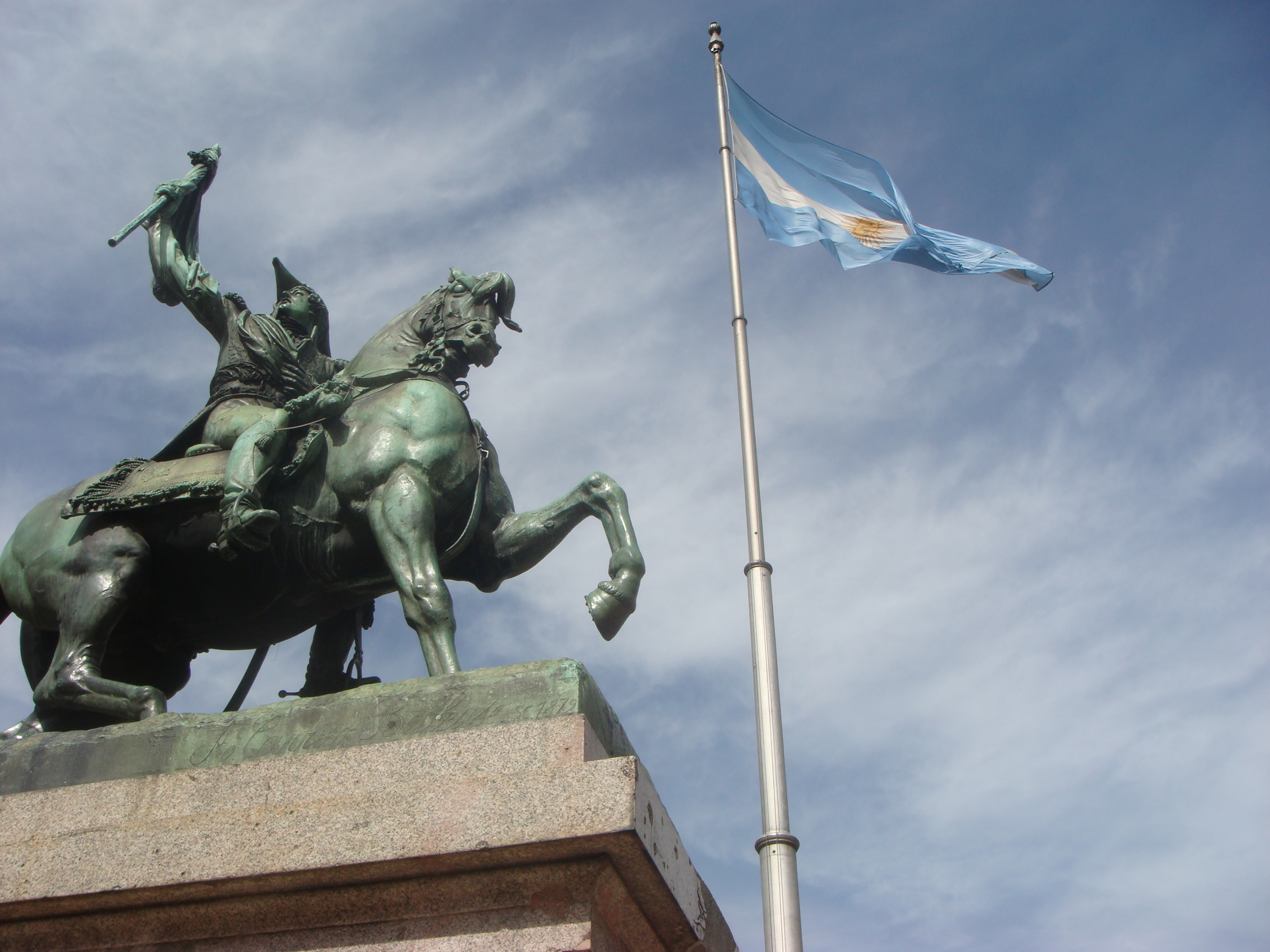

== See also ==
- Manuel Belgrano
- Plaza de Mayo
