= Macdonald-Cartier =

Macdonald-Cartier may refer to:

- Macdonald-Cartier Freeway, in southern Ontario, also known as Highway 401
- Macdonald-Cartier Bridge, a bridge between Ottawa, Ontario, and Gatineau, Quebec
- Ottawa Macdonald–Cartier International Airport, a major Canadian airport in Ottawa
- Macdonald-Cartier High School, a former Quebec high school in Saint-Hubert, Quebec, that merged with Richelieu Valley Regional High School
- École secondaire Macdonald-Cartier, a French public language high school in Sudbury
