= Pierre Carrier-Belleuse =

French painter

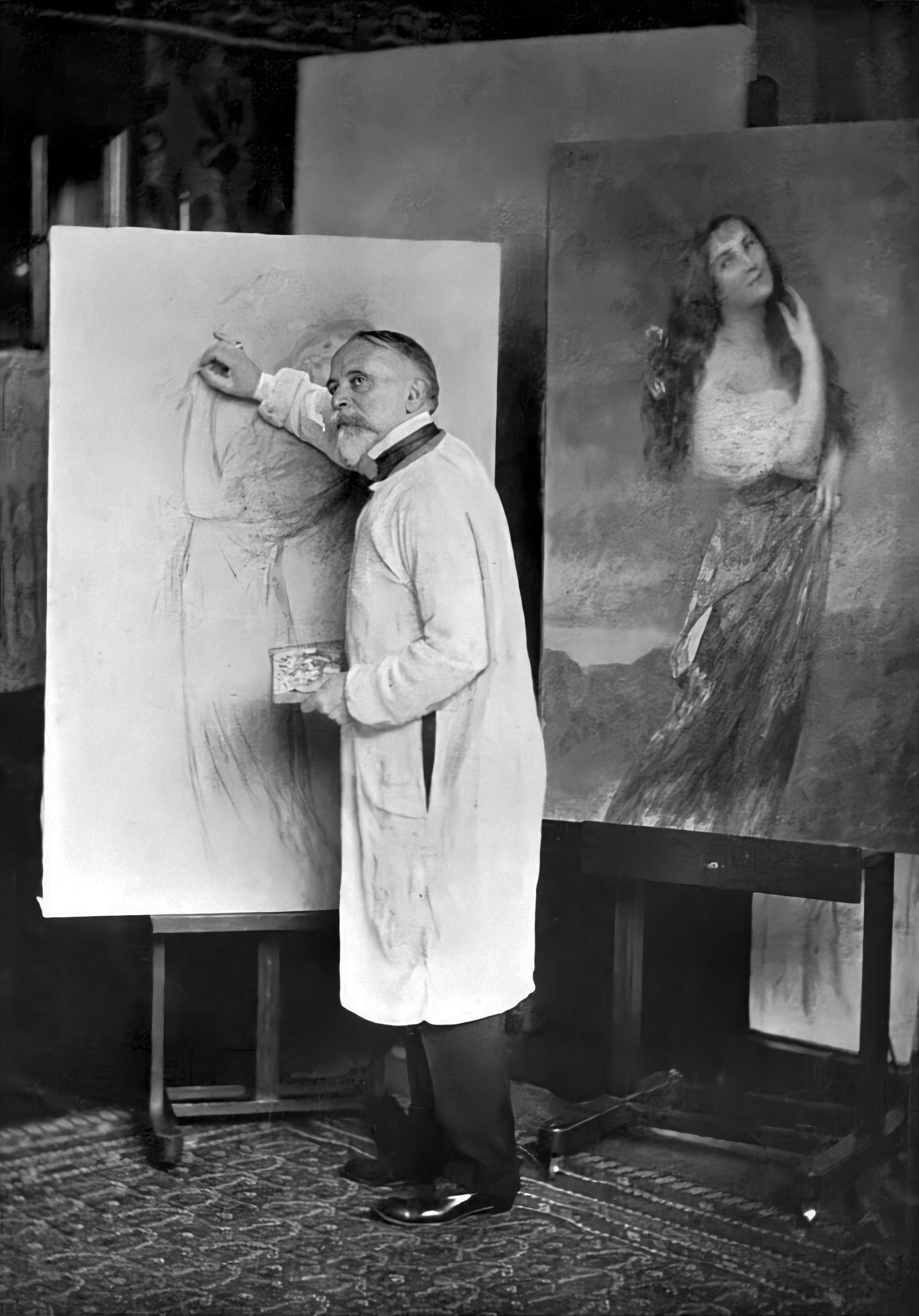
- Portrait of Pierre Carrier-Belleuse at his studio
- Born: 28 January 1851; Paris, France
- Died: 29 January 1932 (aged 81); Paris, France

Pierre-Gérard Carrier-Belleuse (28 January 1851 – 29 January 1932) was a French painter.

== Biography ==
His first studies were with his father, the sculptor Albert-Ernest Carrier-Belleuse. Later he studied with Alexandre Cabanel and Pierre Victor Galland at the École des Beaux-Arts.

He exhibited at the Salon of 1875 and won a silver medal at the Exposition Universelle (1889). He also produced drawings and lithographs for Le Figaro Illustré.

Best known for his ballet scenes and pastels, he also did landscapes, portraits and genre works. Most of his paintings are in private collections.

Between 1914 and 1916, he and Auguste François-Marie Gorguet proposed, planned and supervised the creation of the Panthéon de la Guerre, which was the world's largest painting (45 ft. high and 402 ft. in circumference) containing almost 5,000 portraits of notable French and Allied wartime figures, mostly sketched from life. Twenty artists played a major role in its production, although many more made contributions. It was exhibited in a specially constructed display building (which was demolished in 1960) next to the Hôtel des Invalides. Later, it made its way to the United States, and reconfigured portions of it may now be seen in the National World War I Museum at the Liberty Memorial in Kansas City. It was his second such work, following the much smaller Panorama de Notre-Dame de Lourdes from 1881.

The painter Louis-Robert Carrier-Belleuse was Carrier-Belleuse's brother.

== Selected paintings ==
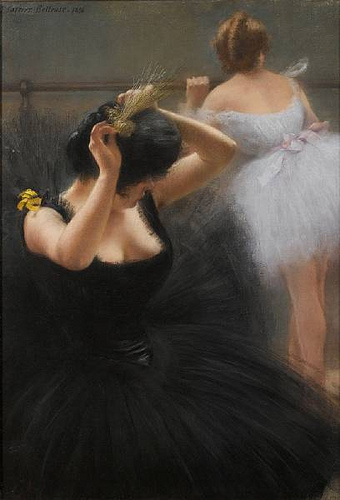
Ballet Preparation (c.1900)

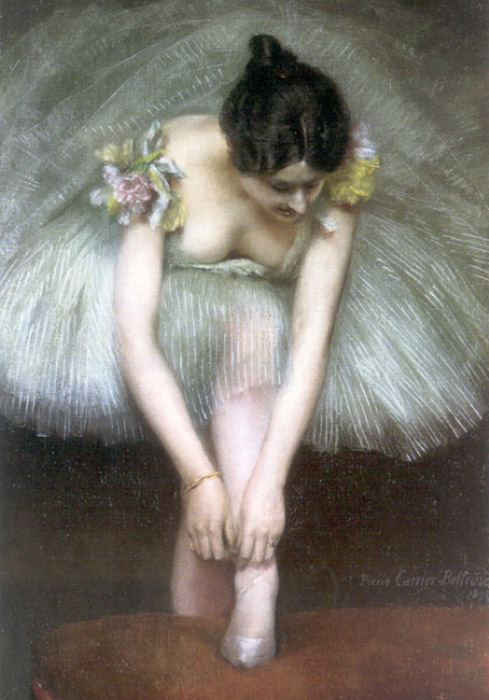
Before the Ballet (1896)

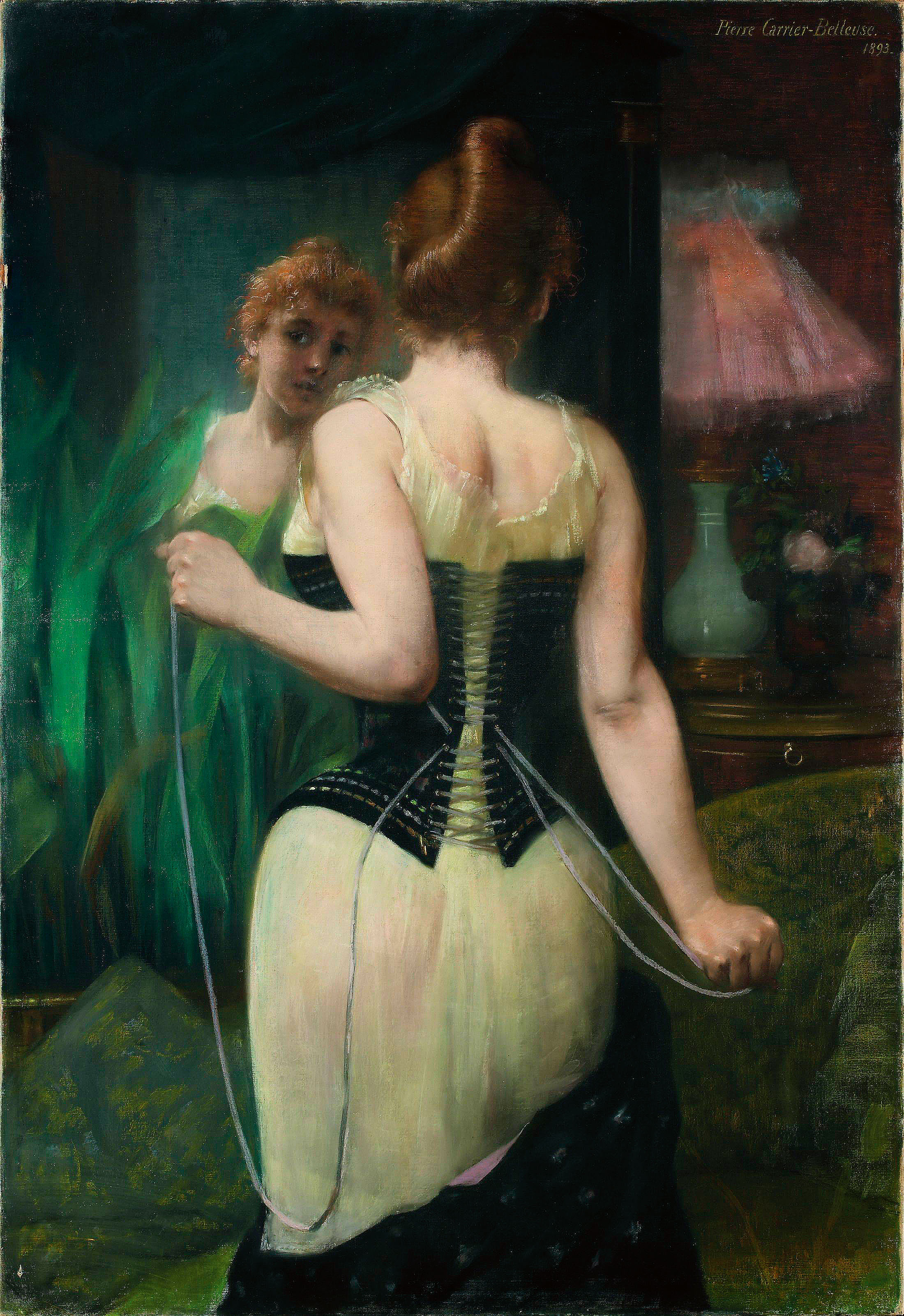
Young Lady Adjusting her Corset (1893)

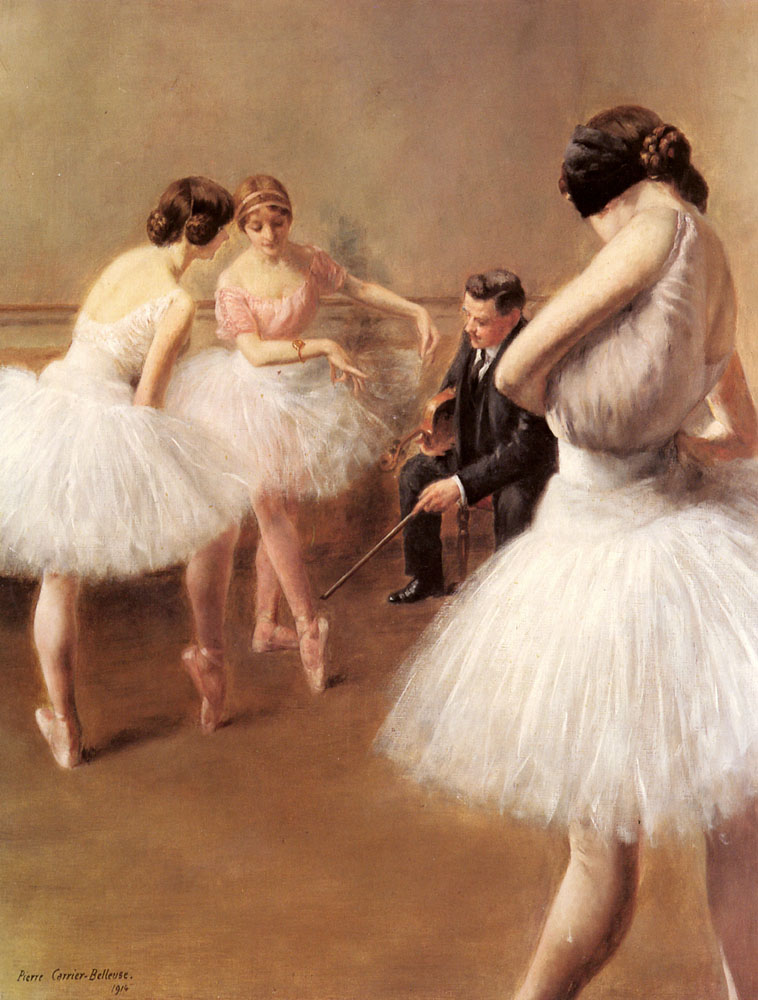
The First Pose (1900)

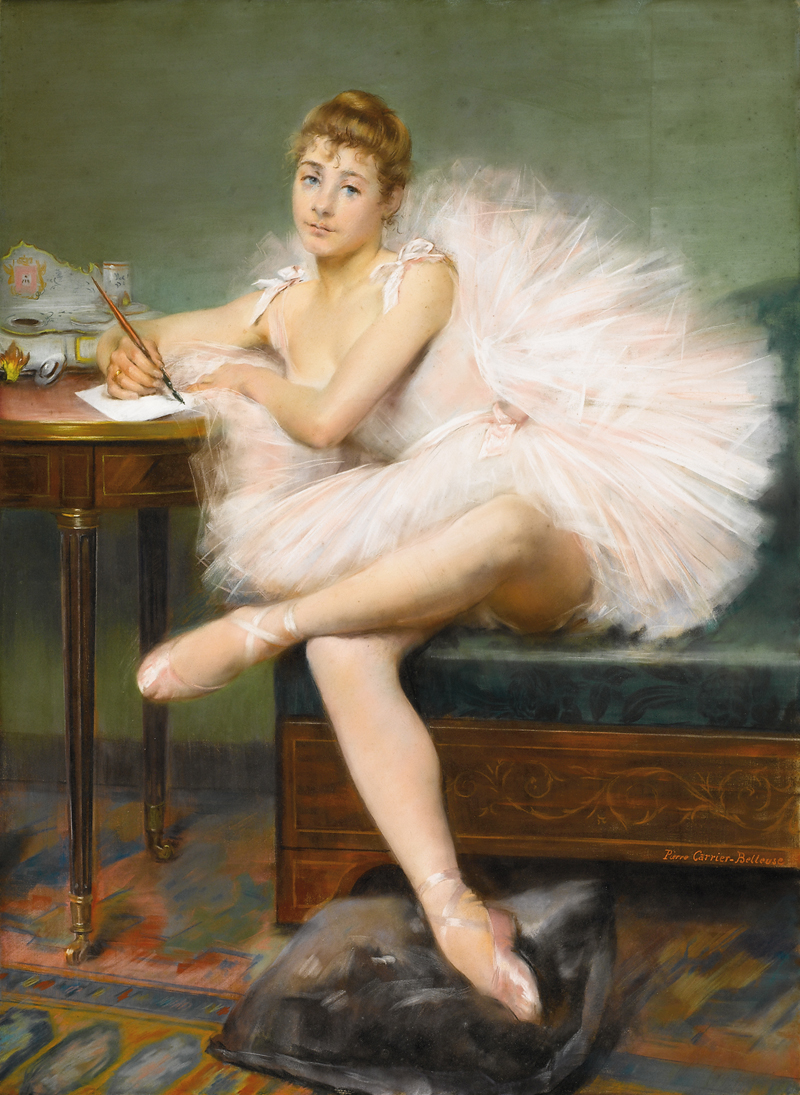
A Ballerina (c.1900)

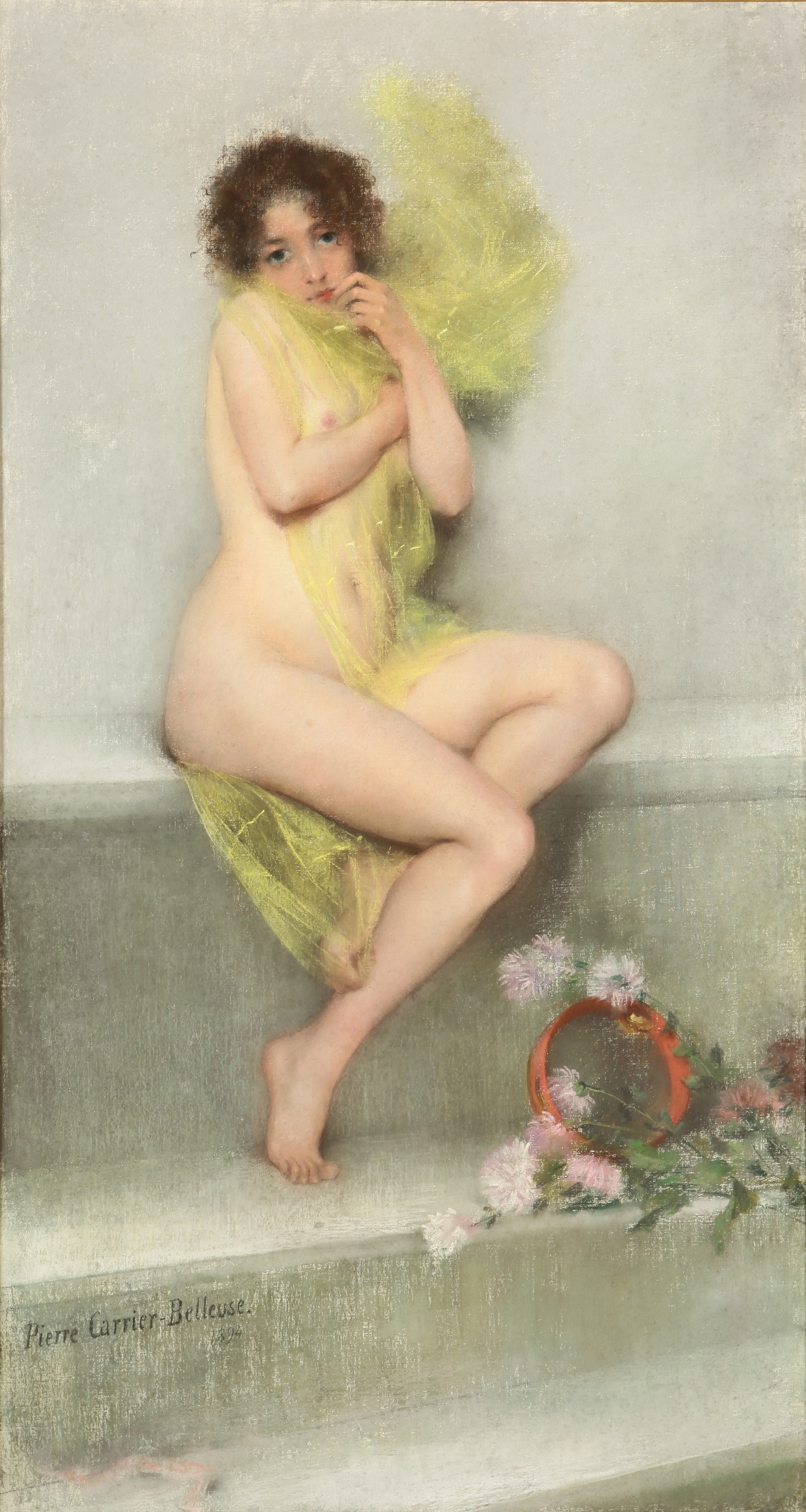
La frileuse (1894)
