= National World War I Museum and Memorial =

Memorial in Kansas City, Missouri, US

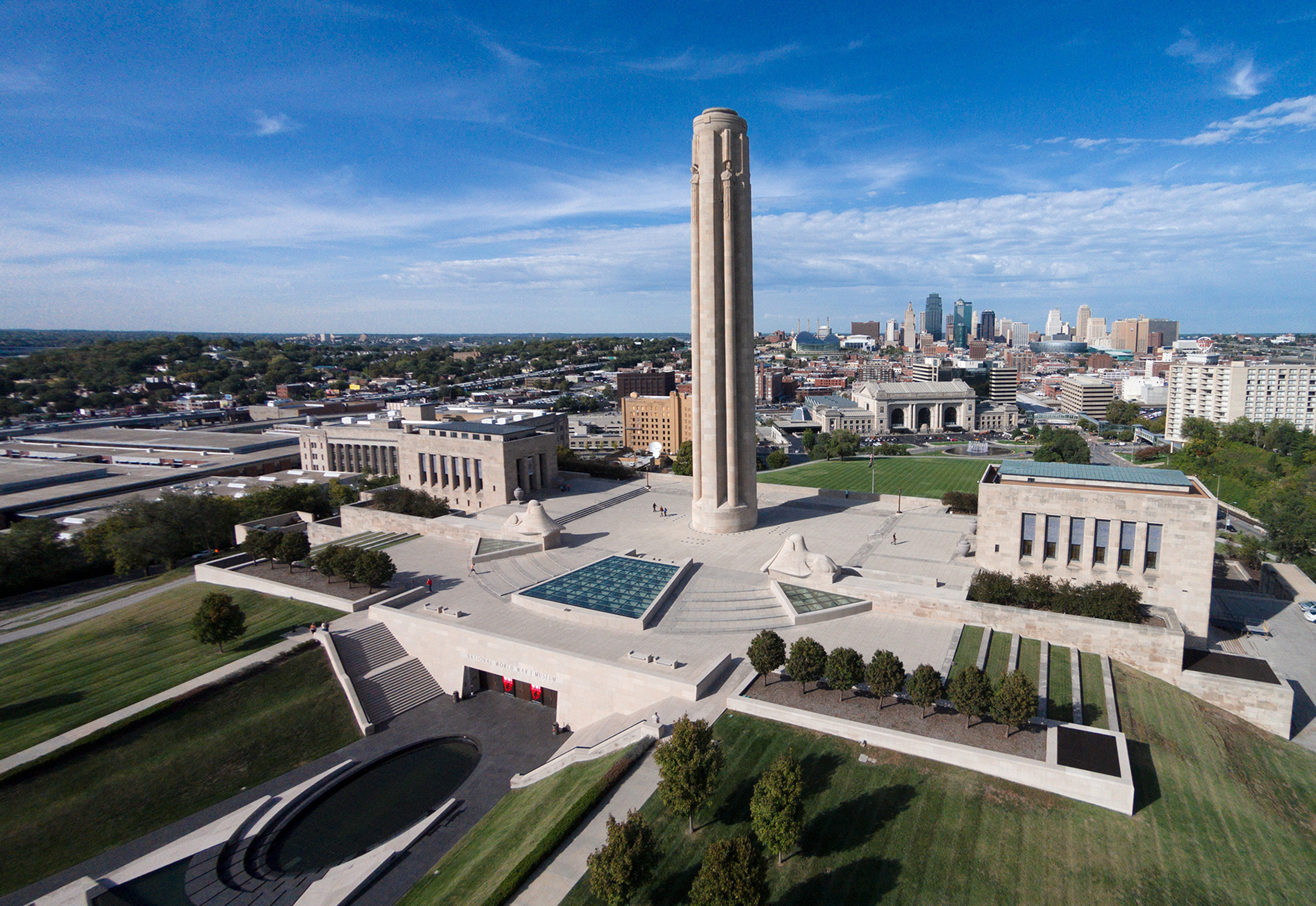
- The Museum in the Kansas City skyline
- Established: November 11, 1926; 99 years ago
- Location: Penn Valley Park, Kansas City, Missouri, U.S.
- Public transit access: Streetcar, bus
- Parking: Onsite (no charge)
- Website: theworldwar.org
- National World War I Museum and Memorial
- U.S. National Register of Historic Places
- U.S. National Historic Landmark
- Coordinates: 39°04′49″N 94°35′10″W
- Built: 1926; 100 years ago
- Architect: Harold Van Buren Magonigle, Westlake Construction Company; George Kessler, landscape architect
- Architectural style: Beaux Arts Classicism, Egyptian Revival
- NRHP reference No.: 00001148

Significant dates
- Added to NRHP: September 20, 2006
- Designated NHL: September 20, 2006

The National World War I Museum and Memorial is located in Kansas City, Missouri, United States. Opened in 1926 as the Liberty Memorial, it was designated by the United States Congress in 2004 as the country's official museum dedicated to World War I. In 2014, as part of the Centennial recognition, Congress added the designation as the country's official war memorial. A non-profit organization manages it in cooperation with the Kansas City Board of Parks and Recreation Commissioners. The museum focuses on global events from the causes of World War I before 1914 through the 1918 armistice and 1919 Paris Peace Conference. Visitors enter the exhibit space within the 32,000-square-foot (3,000 m^{2}) facility across a glass bridge above a field of 9,000 red poppies, each representing 1,000 combatant deaths. As of 2025, the museum's collection includes more than 350,000 items, making it one of the largest World War I collections globally.

The museum was closed in 1994 for renovations and reopened in December 2006 with an expanded facility to exhibit an artifact collection begun in 1920.

== History ==
=== Liberty Memorial Association ===
Soon after World War I ended, a group of 40 prominent Kansas City residents formed the Liberty Memorial Association (LMA) to create a memorial to those who had served in the war. For president, they chose lumber baron and philanthropist Robert A. Long, who had personally donated a large sum of money. James Madison Kemper was treasurer of the association, who had been briefly in 1919 the President of City Center Bank that was founded by his father, William T. Kemper. Real estate developer J. C. Nichols was a lead proponent, and businessman and philanthropist William Volker helped the city acquire the land. George Kessler was the landscape designer. Thomas Rogers Kimball, former president of the American Institute of Architects, assisted Henry M Beardsley in selecting the architect, Harold Van Buren Magonigle.

In 1919, the LMA led a fund drive that included 83,000 contributors and collected more than US$2.5 million in less than two weeks (equivalent to $46.4 million in 2025), driven by what museum curator Doran Cart has described as "complete, unbridled patriotism". This prevented the monetary problems that had plagued the Bunker Hill Monument for the American Revolutionary War in Boston one century earlier.

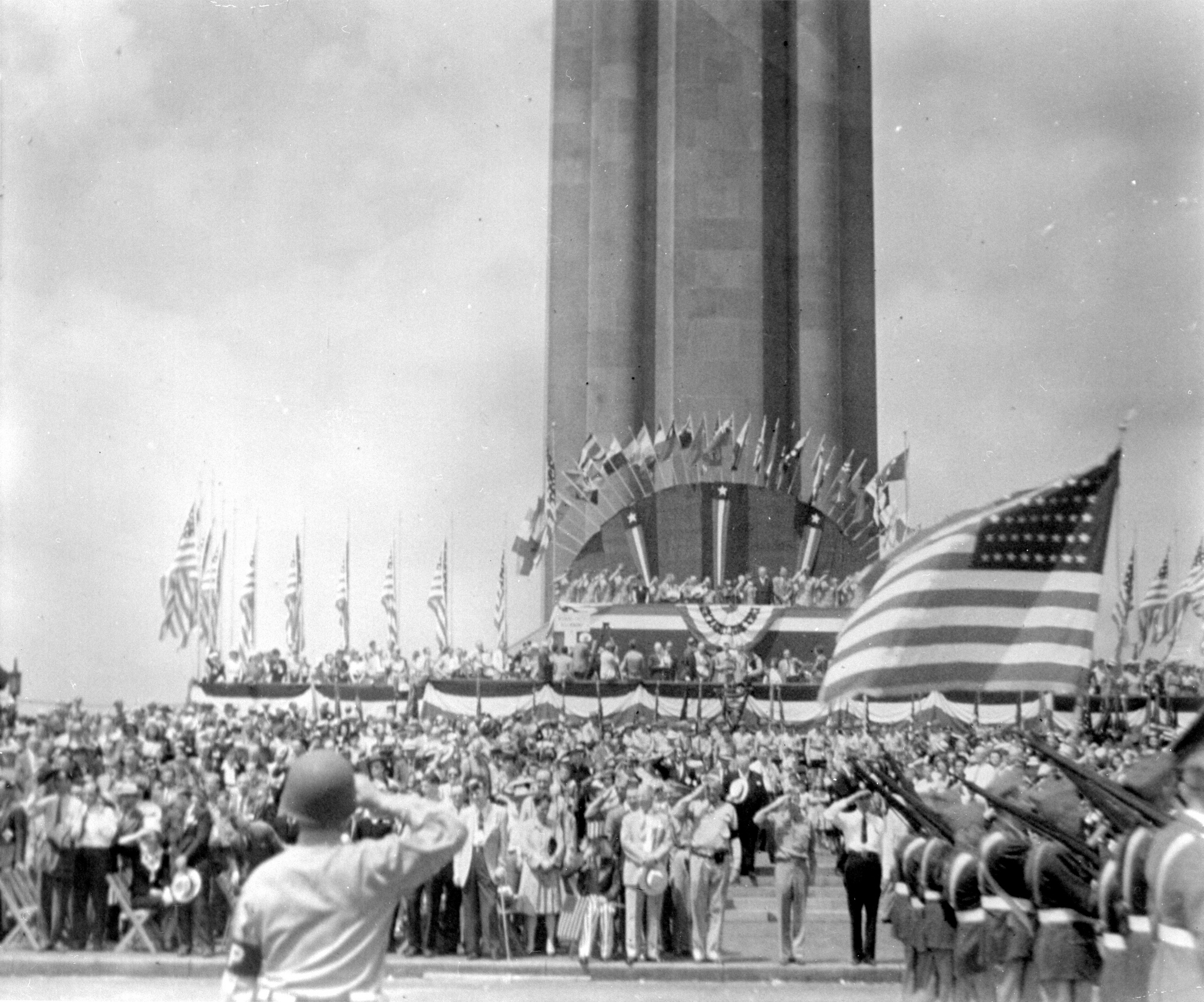
Commemorative ceremonies on its 14th anniversary at the Liberty Memorial, c. 1940

=== Dedications ===
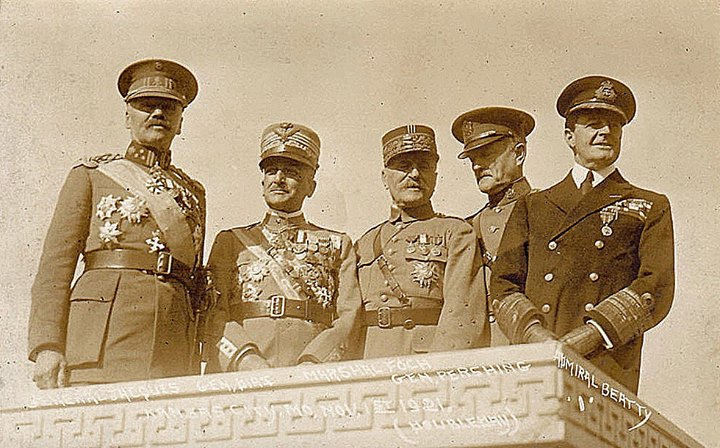
Jacques, Diaz, Foch, Pershing, and Beatty were at the 1921 groundbreaking.

The groundbreaking ceremony on November 1, 1921, was attended by 200,000 people, including Vice President Calvin Coolidge, Lieutenant General Baron Jacques of Belgium, Admiral of the Fleet Lord Beatty of Great Britain, General Armando Diaz of Italy, Marshal Ferdinand Foch of France, General of the Armies John J. Pershing of the United States, and 60,000 members of the American Legion. The local veteran chosen to present flags to the commanders was a Kansas City haberdasher, Harry S. Truman, who would later serve as 33rd President of the United States from 1945 to 1953. The finished monument was dedicated on November 11, 1926, by 30th President Coolidge, in the presence of Queen Marie of Romania. Coolidge announced that the memorial "...has not been raised to commemorate war and victory, but rather the results of war and victory which are embodied in peace and liberty ... Today I return in order that I may place the official sanction of the national government upon one of the most elaborate and impressive memorials that adorn our country. The magnitude of this memorial, and the broad base of popular support on which it rests, can scarcely fail to excite national wonder and admiration."

=== Renovations ===
In 1935, bas reliefs by Walker Hancock of Jacques, Beatty, Diaz, Foch, and Pershing were unveiled.

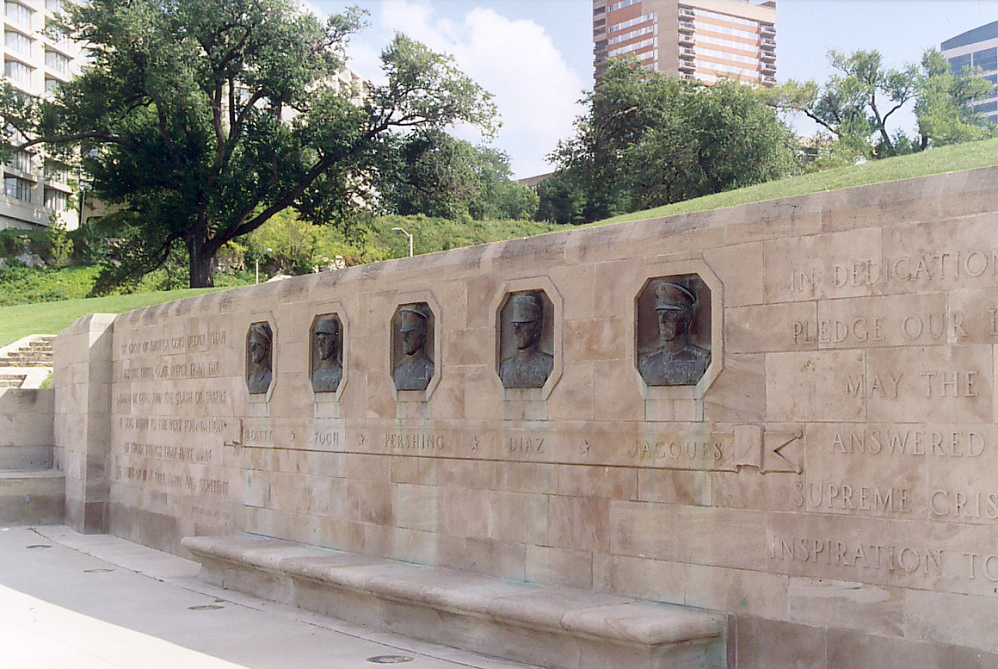
The Beatty, Foch, Pershing, Diaz, and Jacques reliefs

In 1961 the monument was rededicated by former President Harry S. Truman. The local effort to restore the fading monument was headed by Armand Glenn, the local head of the central district legion. Local company Hallmark provided support, and on November 11, 1961, on its 40th anniversary, there was a large dedication ceremony on the memorial grounds. A crowd of 15,000 watched Truman preside over the service.

In 1981–1982, corresponding to its 60th anniversary, the building revealed new exhibits under improved lighting sources.

The memorial was closed in 1994 due to safety concerns because aging had produced problems with drainage and the original construction. Local shopping malls voluntarily helped to display part of the museum collection while the memorial was unavailable. When the poor condition of the building became an embarrassment for the city, Kansas City voters in 1998 passed a limited-run sales tax to support the restoration. Plans were made to expand the site with a museum to accommodate the LMA's growing collection. Local, national, and international support provided $102 million (equivalent to $201 million in 2025), ultimately revealed at its 2006 reopening.

In 2004, Congress named it the nation's official World War I museum, and construction started on a new 80,000-square-foot (7,400 m^{2}) expansion and the Edward Jones Research Center underneath the original memorial, which was completed in 2006. The Liberty Memorial was designated a National Historic Landmark on September 20, 2006.

A substantial renovation, estimated at $5 million, began in December 2011. It included $170,000 in energy efficiency upgrades and improvements to the artificial flame atop the tower. After several months of dormancy, the flame was relit on February 1, 2013. Security was upgraded, certain limestone sections were repaired, and the brush was removed.

In 2016, it was announced that Wylie Gallery would be constructed within unused space on the east side of the museum building. It was part of a $6.4 million upgrade made possible by a fundraising campaign coinciding with the tenth anniversary of the museum's 2006 reopening. The gallery was opened in 2018 and houses traveling exhibits from around the world.

=== Current designation and recent history ===
On December 19, 2014, President Barack Obama signed legislation recognizing it as "a 'World War I Museum and Memorial'", which resulted in the redesignation of the entire site as the National World War I Museum and Memorial.

In the 2010s and 2020s, the parades celebrating the championships of the Kansas City Royals and Kansas City Chiefs ended with rallies held on the lawn between Union Station and the National World War I Museum and Memorial.

The Kansas City FIFA Fan Festival for the 2026 FIFA World Cup was held at the site.

== Design ==
The national design competition was managed by Thomas R. Kimball, a former president of the American Institute of Architects (AIA). After discord within the organization locally, the design contract was finally awarded to New York architect Harold Van Buren Magonigle. A disagreement between the Kansas City Chapter of AIA members and Kimball over the rules caused almost half of the local members to resign in April 1922. They immediately formed the Architectural League of Kansas City, which was merged into the AIA in the early 1930s. Unlike the AIA at the time, the Architectural League of Kansas City provided membership to less experienced architects and drafters and provided social and educational opportunities. Regardless of the controversy, many local architects submitted entries, including those who resigned from the AIA. The jury unanimously awarded the contract to Magonigle.

=== Liberty Tower ===
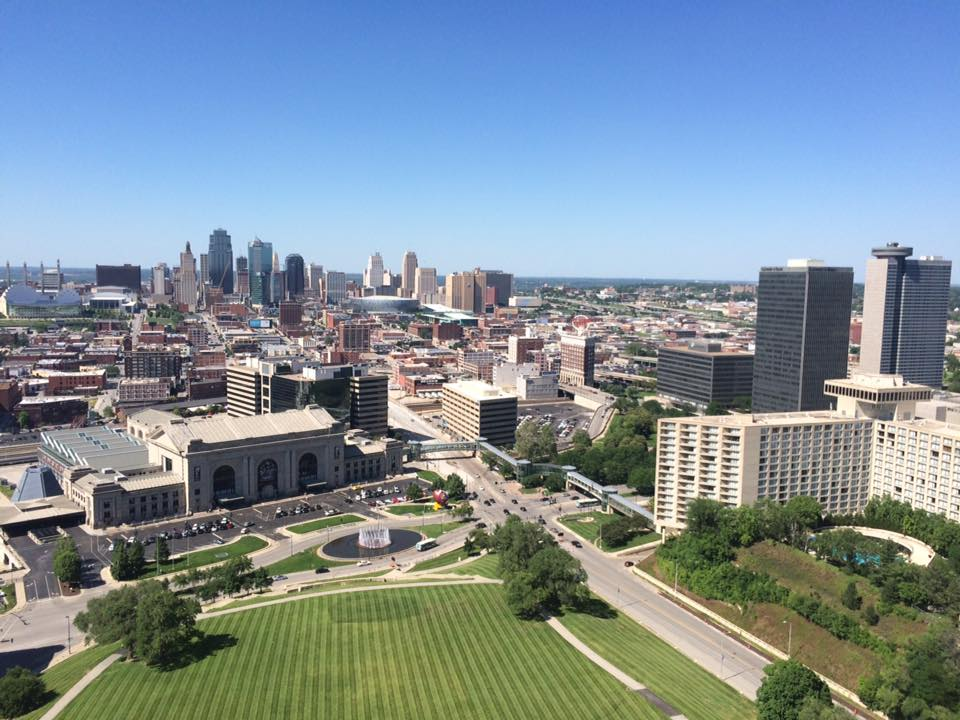
Union Station and the skyline are viewed from atop the Liberty Memorial.

The main doors at the bottom of a large set of stairs are made from ornamental bronze, and the walls of the first-floor lobby are finished in Kasota stone quarried in Kasota, Minnesota. The first-floor corridor and the grand stairway are finished in travertine imported from Italy. At night, the top of the 217-foot-tall (66-meter) memorial tower emits a flame effect from steam illuminated by bright red and orange lights. The illusion of a burning pyre can be seen from some distance. Overall, the memorial rises 265 feet (81 meters) above the surrounding area.

The tower is crowned with four sculptures, the Guardian Spirits. Carved by Robert Aitken and each standing 40 feet (12 m) tall, they represent protectors of peace, each holding a sword and named for a virtue: Honor, Courage, Patriotism, and Sacrifice.

=== External buildings ===
The tower and buildings are designed in the classical Egyptian Revival architecture style with a limestone exterior. The foundation was constructed using sawed granite, and the exterior ground-level walls are made of Bedford stone. On opposite sides of the main deck of the Liberty Memorial are Exhibition Hall and Memory Hall. Memory Hall includes murals originally painted for the Panthéon de la Guerre in Paris, and adapted by LeRoy Daniel MacMorris in the 1950s.

Between each hall and the tower, above the museum entrance, sit two stone Assyrian sphinxes, named "Memory" and "Future", covering their faces with their wings. Memory faces East, shielding its face from the horrors of the European battlefields. Its counterpart faces West and shrouds its eyes from a future yet unseen.

=== Main museum building ===
The underground portion was designed by Ralph Appelbaum Associates and expanded the original facilities. The north side of the museum, opposite the main entrance and below the Liberty tower, contains a large work of art upon its wall, which is visible from neighboring Union Station.

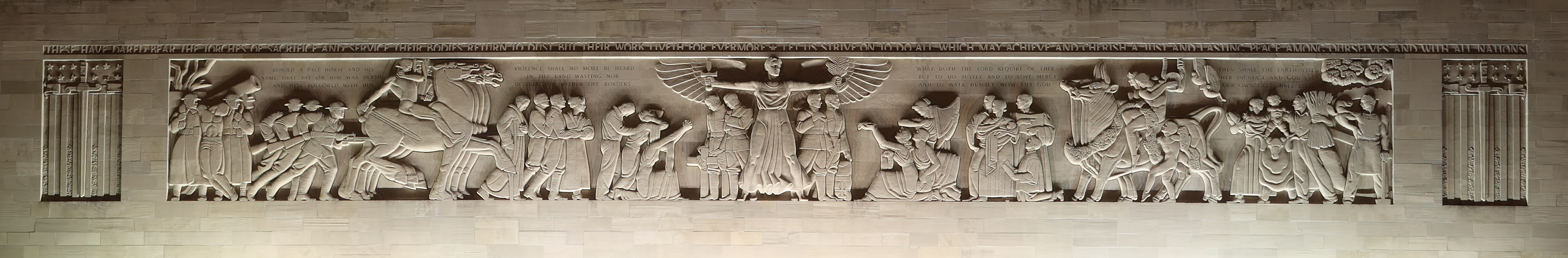
The Great Frieze by Edmond Amateis. The main inscription reads "These have dared bear the torches of sacrifice and service. Their bodies return to dust but their work liveth evermore. Let us strive on to do all which may achieve and cherish a just and lasting peace among ourselves and with all nations."

=== Grounds ===
The grounds were designed by George Kessler who is also famous for his pioneering City Beautiful design for the Kansas City park and boulevard system. Kessler Road borders the west side.

Just outside the museum entrance is a large elliptical fountain, and on each side is a tapering staircase ascending to the memorial deck above. The approach from the south contains the Walk of Honor, a series of engraved bricks in three sections commemorating veterans of World War I, veterans of all wars, and honored civilians.

== Museum features ==
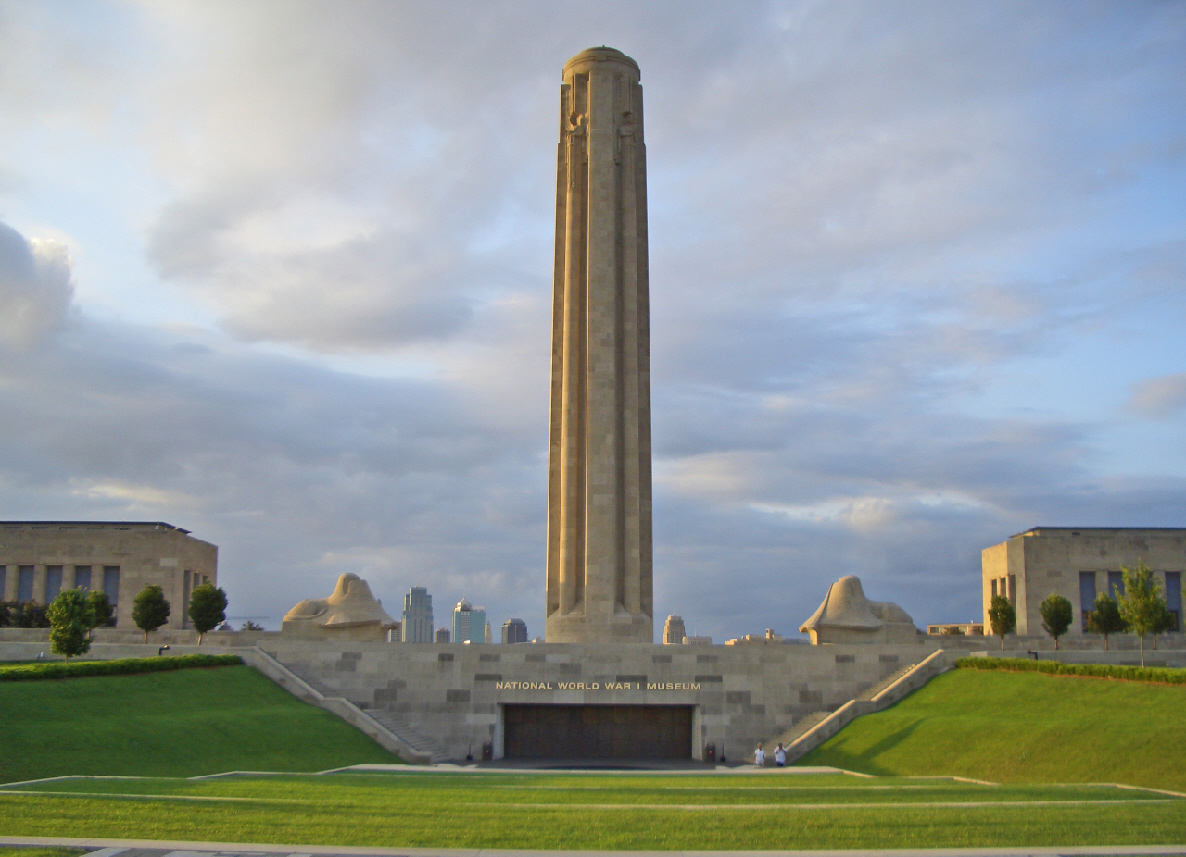
Liberty Memorial is flanked by Exhibition and Memory Halls and the unseeing sphinxes. Beneath them sit the museum and research center.

- Two main galleries containing exhibitions with period artifacts. The first focuses on the beginning of the Great War prior to U.S. involvement, and the second focuses on the United States's military and civilian involvement in the war and efforts for peace. Items in these collections include:
  - A Renault FT tank
  - Uniforms such as Paul von Hindenburg's Model 1915 Field Jacket
  - A 1917 Harley-Davidson Model J motorcycle
  - A 1918 Ford Model T ambulance
  - General John J. Pershing's headquarter flag
  - Munitions
  - Maps and photographs
  - International propaganda posters
  - Replica trenches
  - State-of-the-art interactive displays
  - Sound booths with audio recordings of the period
- Two theaters have an educational narrative. One precedes the first gallery, and a larger one is passed through to enter the second gallery.
- The Edward Jones Research Center, carrying 75,000 archival documents, 9,500 library items, and additional objects.
- R.A. Long Education Center: A multi-purpose conference room and classroom
- J.C. Nichols Auditorium for special events
- The Over There Café featuring flags, music, artwork, and menu items inspired by "the people and places of the Great War".
- A museum store

== See also ==
- National Civil War Museum
- National World War II Museum
- List of National Historic Landmarks in Missouri
- National Register of Historic Places listings in Jackson County, Missouri: Downtown Kansas City
