= Disease carrier =

Disease carrier could refer to:

- Asymptomatic carrier, a person or organism infected with an infectious disease agent, but displays no symptoms
- Genetic carrier, a person or organism that has inherited a genetic trait or mutation, but displays no symptoms
