= Louis-Robert Carrier-Belleuse =

French painter and sculptor

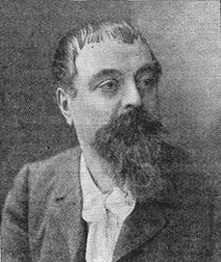
Photograph of Belleuse, published in Le Petit Larousse of 1913.

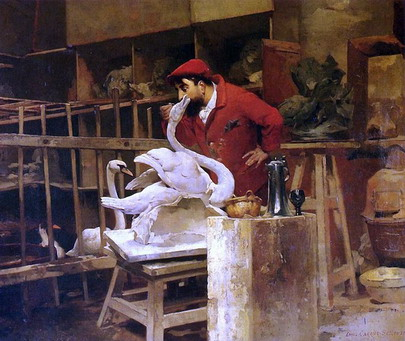
The Animal Sculptor (1880)

Louis-Robert Carrier-Belleuse (4 July 1848 – 14 June 1913) was a French painter and sculptor.

He was son and pupil of Albert-Ernest Carrier-Belleuse, and the brother of painter Pierre Carrier-Belleuse. He designed the patterns of the Faïencerie (earthenware factory) from Choisy-le-Roi, where he was artistic director.

He was also the sculptor of the 1872 Equestrian monument to General Manuel Belgrano in Buenos Aires, Argentina, and designed the tomb of the assassinated Guatemalan president José María Reina Barrios.

== Selected works ==
- Une équipe de bitumiers, 1883 (Musée du Luxembourg)
- Porteurs de farine, 1885, (Musée du Petit Palais)
- Nymphe & satyre, marble sculpture (Musée Jules Chéret in Nice)
- Les Petits Ramoneurs, (Musée de Rochefort)
- Une Petite Curieuse, (Musée de Rochefort)
- Marchand de Journaux, (Musée de Rochefort)
- Les joueurs d'echecs, (Musée de Besançon)
