= Czechoslovak Air Force =

- Československé letectvo
- Badge of the Czechoslovak Air Force
- Active: 1918–1992
- Disbanded: Dissolution of Czechoslovakia
- Country: Czechoslovakia
- Type: Air force
- Role: Aerial warfare
- Part of: Czechoslovak Army; Czechoslovak People's Army
- Headquarters: Prague (until 1981); Stará Boleslav (from 1981)
- Motto: "Our sea is in the air"
- Engagements: Polish–Czechoslovak War; Hungarian–Czechoslovak War; World War II; Air battle over Merklín

Commanders
- Notable commanders: Jindřich Kostrba (1918–1919); Karel Janoušek (1940–1945)

Insignia
- Roundel

The Czechoslovak Air Force (Československé letectvo) or the Czechoslovak Army Air Force (Československé vojenské letectvo) was the air force branch of the Czechoslovak Army formed in October 1918. The armed forces of Czechoslovakia ceased to exist on 31 December 1992. By the end of the year, all aircraft of the Czechoslovak Air Force were divided between the Czech Air Force and the Slovak Air Force.

== Organization ==
On 30 October 1918, the establishment of Aviation Corps (Letecký sbor) marked the beginning of the Czechoslovak Air Force.

Under the First Republic, the air force was an integral service of the Czechoslovak army. During peacetime, the army aviation was a subordinate agency of the Ministry of National Defence within its 3rd Department of Aviation (III. odbor (letecký) Ministerstva národní obrany) under the command of divisional general Jaroslav Fajfr (as of October 1938). It was anticipated that individual squadrons and flights would be attached to various field corps and divisions in case of war with Germany.

After the liberation of Czechoslovakia in 1945, the air force was once again organized as an integral part of the army within following ministerial departments:

- 1945–1950: Air Force Command of the Main Staff (Velitelství letectva hlavního štábu)
- 1950–1957: Air Force Command (Velitelství letectva)

In mid-1950s, following the example of Soviet Air Defence Forces, the State Air Defence (Protivzdušná obrana státu, PVOS) was formed alongside the Air Force.

- 1957–1966: Air Force and State Air Defence Command (Velitelství letectva a protivzdušné obrany státu)
- 1966–1969: Main Department of Air Force and State Air Defence (Hlavní správa letectva a vojsk protivzdušné obrany státu)
- 1969–1976: Department of Air Force and State Air Defence (Správa letectva a vojsk protivzdušné obrany státu)

In 1976, the State Air Defence formed its own command (1976–1990).

- 1976–1990: Air Force Command (Velitelství letectva) – see also Air Forces Command structure in 1989

In May 1990, the State Air Defence (PVOS), Air Defence of Ground Forces and Frontline Aviation were merged to form an integrated branch of the armed forces – the Czechoslovak Air Force and Air Defence.

- 1990–1991: Air Force and State Air Defence Command (Velitelství letectva a protivzdušné obrany státu)
- 1991–1992: Air Force and Air Defence Command (Velitelství letectva a protivzdušné obrany)

== History ==
=== Under the First Republic 1918–1938 ===
When the First Czechoslovak Republic was founded in October 1918 it was landlocked and surrounded by potentially hostile neighbours. Its government realised the need for an air force, and quickly founded one with the motto "Our sea is in the air".

From Austria-Hungary the new republic inherited only three military airfields and a handful of Hansa-Brandenburg aircraft. In the First World War few Czechs or Slovaks had served in the Imperial and Royal Aviation Troops or naval air corps, or in exile in the French Air Force or Imperial Russian Air Service.

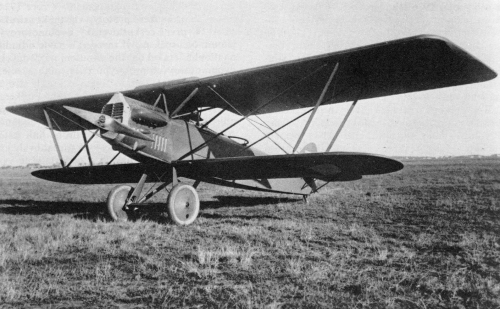
Aero A.30 light bomber and reconnaissance biplane

Much of Austria-Hungary's manufacturing companies were Czech, therefore Czechoslovakia could quickly develop an aircraft industry. At first it tended to build foreign designs of aircraft and aero engines under license. As the industry developed it designed more aircraft and engines of its own. Czechoslovak aircraft builders included Aero, Avia, Beneš-Mráz, Letov, Praga, Tatra and Zlín. Engine makers included ČKD, Walter and Škoda.

Aero (Aero továrna letadel) was in the Vysočany quarter of Prague. Its mixed construction (wood, metal, and fabric covering) and all-metal aircraft were competitive in the early 1930s, but by 1938, only its MB.200 (a licensed Bloch design) was not totally obsolete.

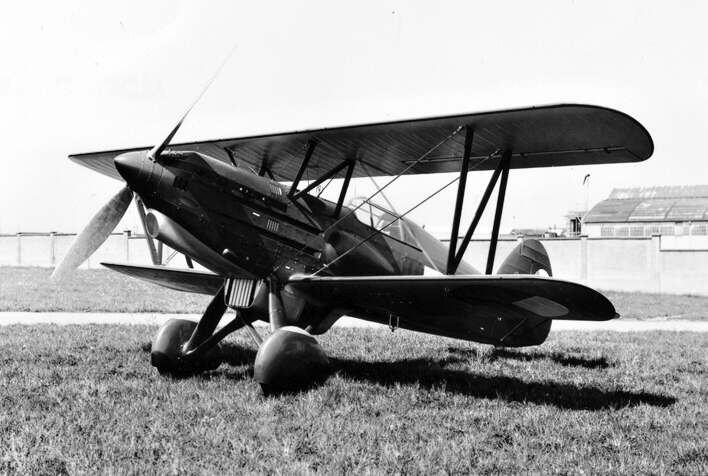
Avia B-534 fighter

Avia (Avia akciová společnost pro průmysl letecký Škoda), a branch of the enormous Škoda Works (Škodovy závody) heavy machinery and military industrial enterprise, was different. Founded in 1919 in a former sugar refinery in the eastern Prague suburbs of Letňany and Čakovice, Avia made entire aeroplanes. Many of its engines were licensed Hispano-Suiza designs. It build the standard Czechoslovak fighter aircraft of the late 1930s, the B-534, of which a total 568 were built. The B-534 and its derivatives were among the last biplane fighters in operational use.

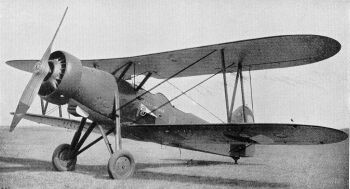
Letov Š-328 biplane, a derivative of the Š-28

The state-controlled Letov factory (Vojenská továrna na letadla Letov) was also in Letňany, where in the late 1930s it employed about 1,200 people. It built the Š-28 reconnaissance and army co-operation biplane, of which more than 470 were made. The entire airframe was welded together, not bolted or riveted. The Letov factory was the only Czechoslovak plant that made metal propellers.

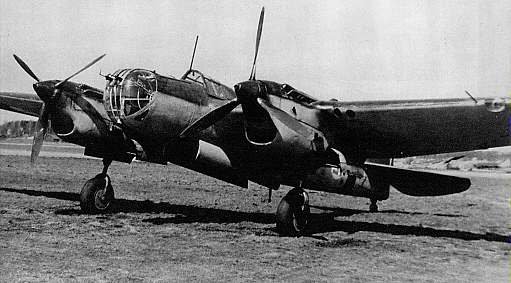
Tupolev SB medium bomber

By the late 1930s Czechoslovakia's bomber aircraft were obsolescent and the speed with which Nazi Germany was becoming a threat did not give Czechoslovak manufacturers enough time to develop a new bomber of their own. So in 1937 the government bought Tupolev SB twin-engined medium bombers from the Soviet Union, plus a license to build more in Czechoslovakia as the Avia B-71. 60 Soviet-built SB bombers were delivered in April and May 1938. This was followed by Avia and Aero building 101 of the B-71 version.

The training of air force recruits had developed from a course of several months in the 1920s to two years by the late 1930s. In 1936 Reichsmarschall Hermann Göring wrote "The Czechoslovak Air Force must be considered as one of the leading air forces as regards personnel, and, considering its limited financial possibilities, more than satisfactory with regard to material and equipment".

=== Crisis and occupation 1938–1939 ===
As the Sudeten crisis with Germany worsened, the Czechoslovak Army and Air Force partly mobilised on 21 May 1938 and fully mobilised on 23 September. The air force had more than 100 airfields and 1,300 aeroplanes, of which 650 were front-line aircraft. But on 29 September the United Kingdom and France agreed to let Germany annex the Sudetenland, which German forces then did without Czechoslovak armed forces being allowed to resist.

The Munich Agreement was followed on 2 November 1938 by the First Vienna Award, in which Germany and Fascist Italy allowed Hungary to annex southern Slovakia. Then on 15 March 1939 Germany occupied Czechoslovakia, created the Protectorate of Bohemia and Moravia rump state and allowed what remained of Slovakia to become the Slovak Republic. Germany allowed Slovakia to keep a small army and air force, but it ordered the puppet government of Bohemia and Moravia to dissolve its armed forces.

The Luftwaffe confiscated all Czechoslovak Air Force aircraft. All Czechoslovak aircraft factories were converted to produce German aircraft and engines.

The Luftwaffe tried to recruit demobilised Czechoslovak airmen to non-combat roles such as ferry flights and meteorological flights, but without success. It also confiscated Czechoslovak aircraft and tried to get Czechoslovak airmen to fly them to Germany. But of seven Czechoslovak pilots who took off from Hradec Králové airfield in Bohemia, none reached Germany. Three flew to Poland, two reached the USSR and the other two crash-landed their aircraft, without injuring themselves but rendering their aircraft beyond economic repair. Thereafter Germany gave up trying to use Czechoslovak airmen.

Emigration was strictly controlled and former air force personnel were not allowed to leave the country. But many Czechoslovak airmen got themselves smuggled into Poland. Of these a few joined the Polish Air Force but most continued to France.

=== Second World War 1939–1945 ===
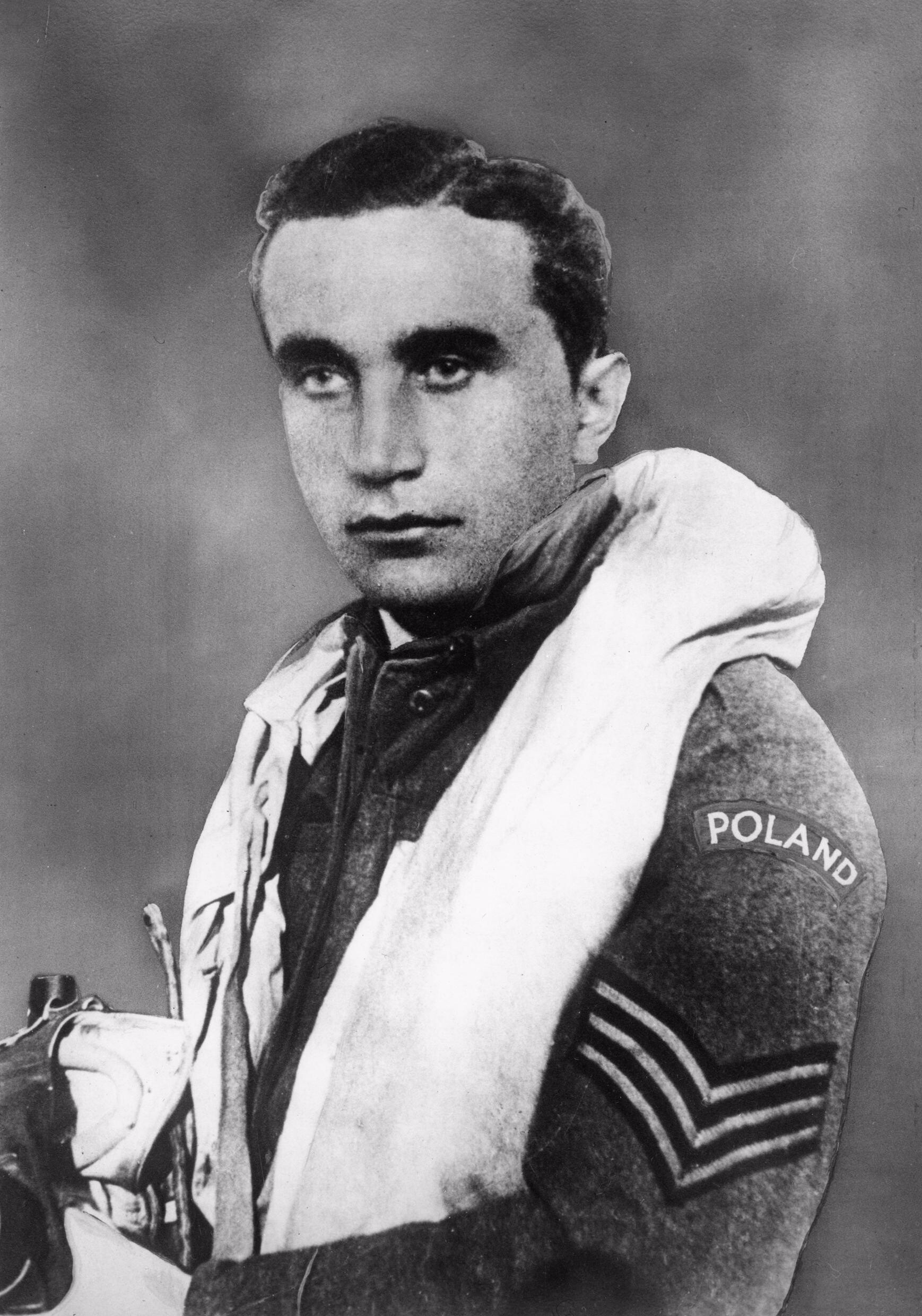
Fighter ace Josef František served in the Czechoslovak, Polish, French and UK air forces

Czechoslovak pilots who joined the Polish Air Force went into action in September 1939 when Germany invaded Poland. Many fought with distinction and 55 were decorated. Josef František was among those awarded Poland's highest military decoration, the Virtuti Militari. After the USSR joined the invasion of Poland its forces captures some Czechoslovak airmen. Others escaped as Poland fell, first reaching Romania and then going via the Balkans and Syria or Lebanon to join their compatriots who had already reached France.

At first France insisted that all Czechoslovak airmen join the Foreign Legion. Only after France had declared war on Germany did it agree with the Czechoslovak National Committee in Paris to let the men transfer to the French Air Force and restore their ranks. They needed to be re-trained to fly French aircraft, but some completed their training in time to fight in the Battle of France in May and June 1940. Of these, seven were awarded France's highest military decoration, the Légion d'honneur, and five received the Médaille militaire. 70 Czechoslovak airmen, including Josef František and Karel Kuttelwascher, were awarded the Croix de Guerre.

==== RAF Volunteer Reserve 1940–1945 ====
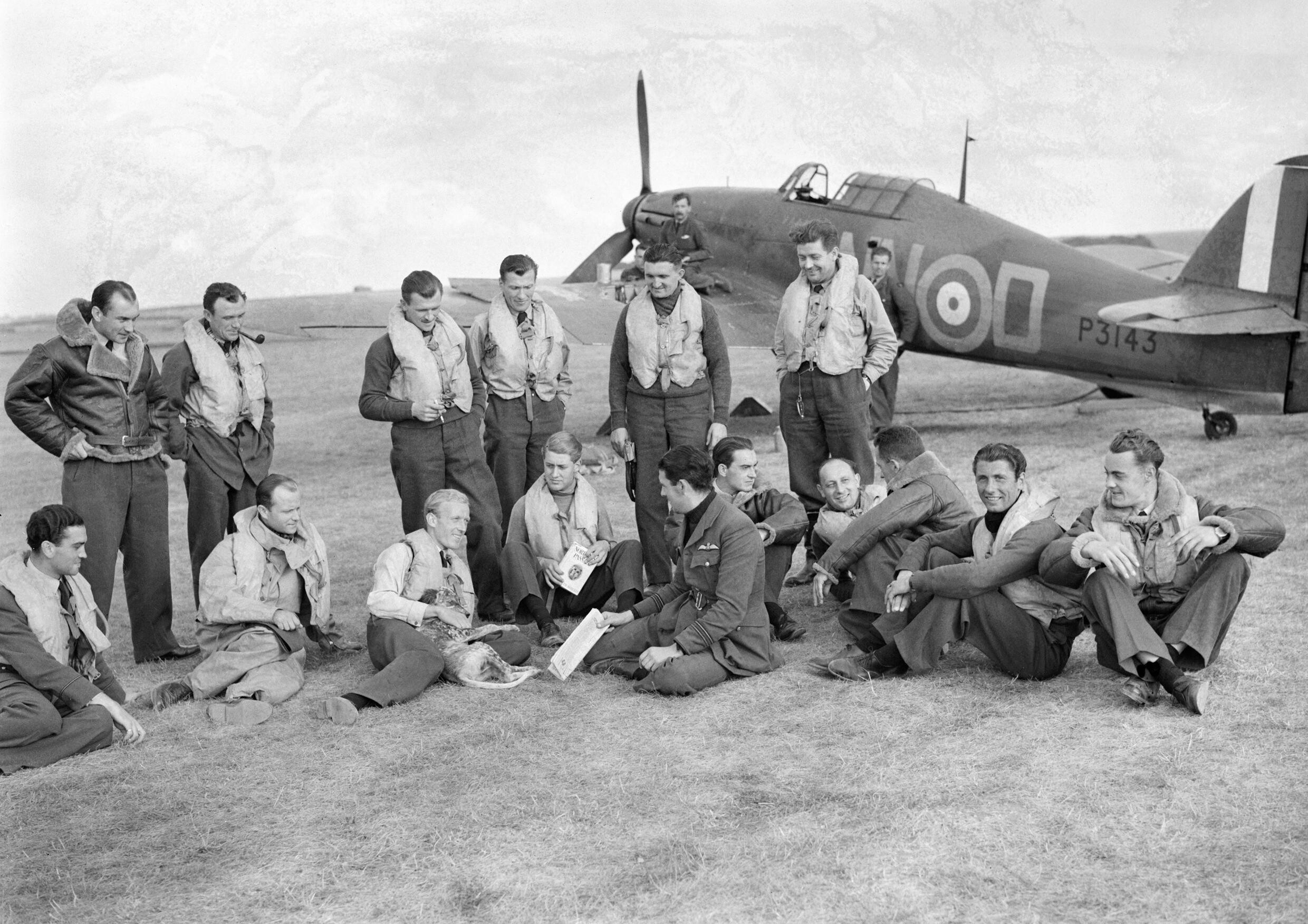
Pilots of 310 Squadron at RAF Duxford in front of a Hawker Hurricane Mk I, September 1940

After France capitulated to Germany on 22 June 1940, many Czechoslovak airmen escaped via either France's Atlantic or Mediterranean coasts or from French North Africa. They reached the United Kingdom, where Brigadier General Karel Janoušek quickly secured an agreement with the UK War Department for them to join the Royal Air Force Volunteer Reserve (RAFVR). On 12 July 1940 an Inspectorate of the Czechoslovak Air Force was established, with Janoušek as Inspector-General with the RAF rank of Air Commodore.

A Czechoslovak depôt was created at RAF Cosford in Shropshire. The RAF quickly created new squadrons formed of Czechoslovak pilots. The first fighter unit was No. 310 Squadron RAF, which was formed on 10 July 1940 and immediately joined in the Battle of Britain. By the end of July a bomber unit, No. 311 Squadron RAF, had been added. Further Czechoslovak fighter units followed: 312 Squadron by August 1940 and 313 Squadron in May 1941.

Czechoslovaks quickly adapted to the structure, tactics and aircraft types of the RAF. Air Chief Marshal Hugh Dowding, who led RAF Fighter Command in the Battle of Britain, later recalled:

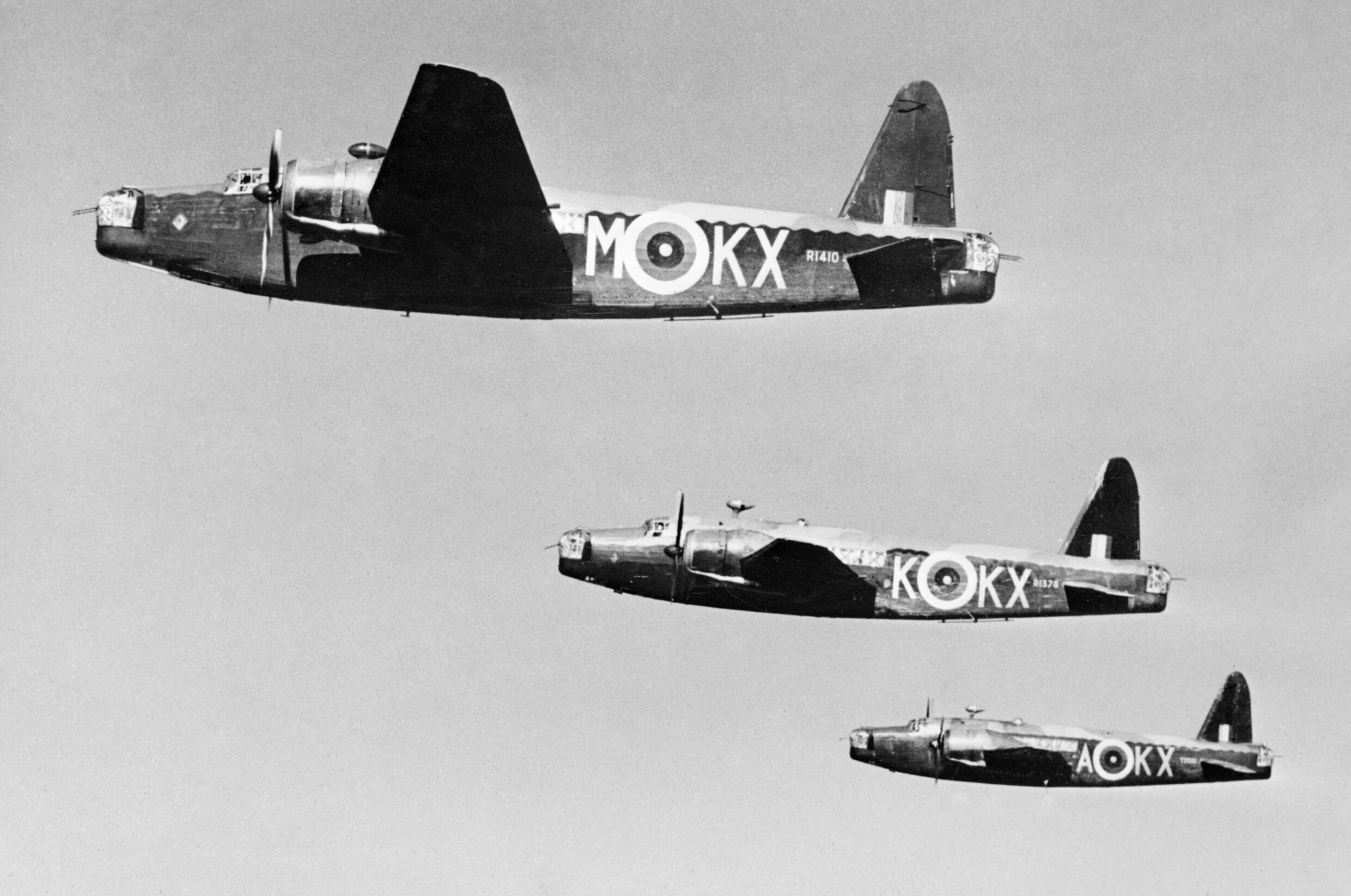
Three Vickers Wellington 1C aircraft of 311 Squadron in flight, March 1941

I must confess that I had been a little doubtful of the effect which their experience in their own countries and in France might have had upon the Polish and Czech pilots, but my doubts were soon laid to rest, because all three squadrons swung in the fight with a dash and enthusiasm which is beyond praise. They were inspired by a burning hatred for the Germans which made them very deadly opponents.

From 1940 until 1942, 311 Squadron was part of No. 3 Group, Bomber Command. The Group commander said 311 "put up a wonderful show" and had "the finest navigators in Bomber Command".

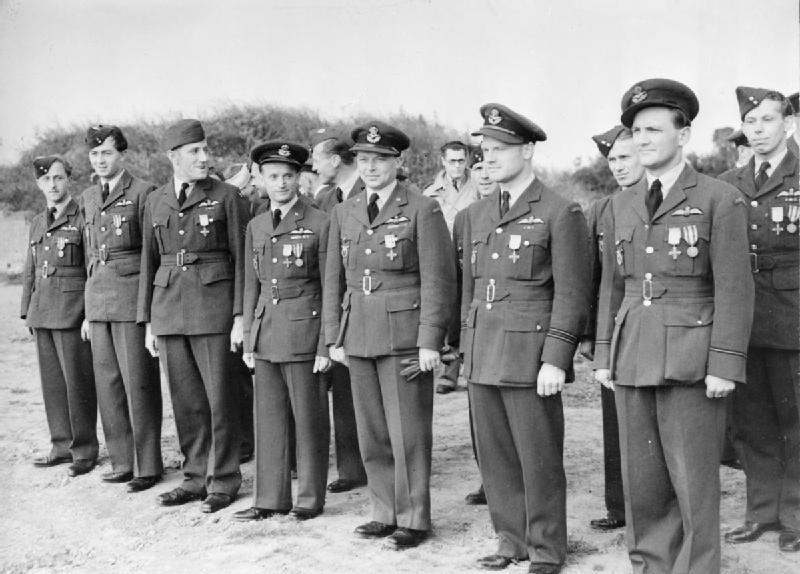
Seven pilots of 312 Squadron at RAF Harrowbeer in Devon, just after President Edvard Beneš has decorated them. Five wear the Czechoslovak War Cross 1939–1945 and four wear what appears to be the Československá medaile Za chrabrost před nepřítelem ("Czechoslovak Medal for valor in face of the Enemy").

A preponderance of air force personnel who escaped from occupied Czechoslovakia were aircrew. The RAF had a shortage of Czechoslovak ground crew, so the new squadrons continued to rely in part on ground crew from the UK and other nationalities. And numerous Czechoslovak airmen were posted to more than 60 other RAF units, including 11 front-line squadrons.

Enough Czechoslovaks were posted to No. 68 Squadron RAF to form an entire flight. No. 68 Squadron even adopted a Czech motto, Vždy připraven ("Always ready"). Czech fighter ace Josef František, acclaimed by one wartime author as "the greatest of all Czechoslovak pilots, perhaps one of the greatest fighters of all time", served in the Battle of Britain in No. 303 Polish Fighter Squadron. Karel Kuttelwascher, a night fighter ace nicknamed the "Night Reaper", served in No. 1 Squadron.

==== Soviet Air Force ====
Other Czech and Slovak pilots fought against Germany under Soviet command. The Air and Air Defence Forces of the postwar Czechoslovak People's Army celebrated 17 September 1944 as the birth date of their force. On that date, a fighter regiment, manned by Czechoslovak personnel, was formed in the Soviet Union. It grew into the 1st Czechoslovak Mixed Air Division which fought on the Eastern Front.

==== Slovak Republic Air Force 1938–1945 ====
After the German partition of Czechoslovakia in 1938, Slovakia was left with a small air force (Slovenské vzdušné zbrane or SVZ) equipped primarily with Czechoslovak aircraft. In 1939 the SVZ defended Slovakia against Hungary in the Slovak–Hungarian War, and fought alongside German forces in the Slovak invasion of Poland.

In the German invasion of Russia the SVZ provided air cover for Slovak forces fighting against the USSR on the Eastern Front. During the campaign Slovakia's obsolete biplanes were replaced with German combat aircraft, including the Messerschmitt Bf 109. The air force was sent back to Slovakia after combat fatigue and desertion had reduced the pilots' effectiveness.

Slovak air units took part in the Slovak National Uprising against Germany from late August 1944.

=== Under the Third Republic 1945–1948 ===
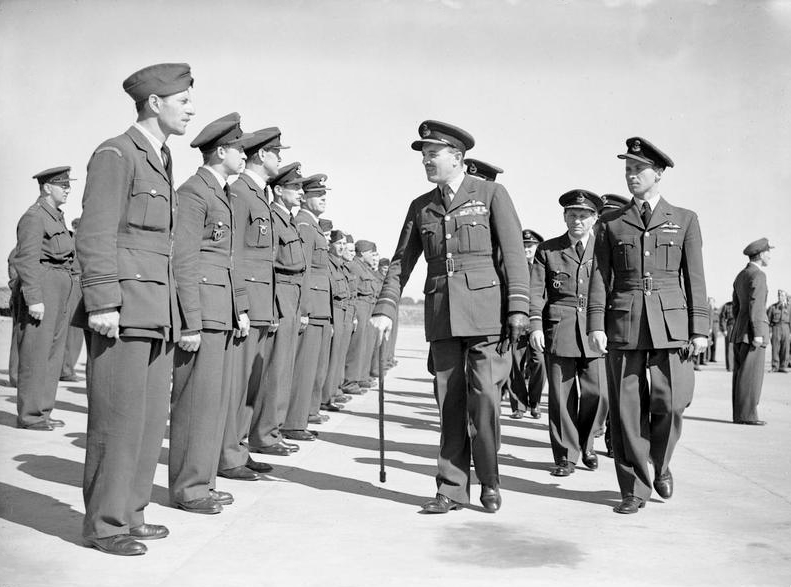
Farewell parade of Czechoslovak squadrons at RAF Manston, Kent, on 3 August 1945. Air Marshal John Slessor, with walking stick, inspects some of the men. Air Marshal Janoušek can be seen behind him.

Towards the end of the Second World War, General Alois Vicherek left Britain for the Soviet Union, where he was supposed to take over command of the Czechoslovak Air Force in the USSR. However, he only arrived on 1 May 1945, when the war was almost over. Vicherek was happy to serve an Eastern Bloc Czechoslovakia, and on 29 May 1945 he was appointed the Commander of the Czechoslovak Air Force.

In August 1945 the RAF's four Czechoslovak squadrons, numbers 310, 311, 312, and 313, all relocated to Czechoslovakia and became part of the Czechoslovak armed forces. By then 310, 312 and 313 squadrons were equipped with Supermarine Spitfire Mk IX aircraft and 311 Squadron was equipped with Consolidated B-24 Liberator heavy bombers. The Spitfires were flown to Czechoslovakia with long range "slipper" fuel tanks to give them enough range for the journey.

On 15 January 1946 311 Squadron became the Czechoslovak 6 letecká divize ("6th Air Division") at Havlíčkův Brod in southeastern Bohemia. In May it was divided into Letecký pluk 24 and Letecký pluk 25 ("24th and 25th Air Regiments"). Letecký pluk 24 was given the name Biskajsky ("Biscay") and initially equipped with Mosquito FB Mk VI fighter-bombers. Letecký pluk 25 was given the name Atlanticky ("Atlantic") and equipped with Petlyakov Pe-2FT aircraft.

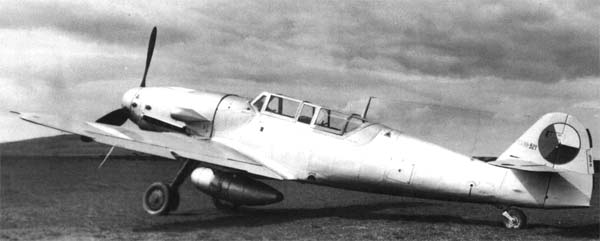
Avia S-99 training aircraft

Under German occupation, Aero and Avia had built Messerschmitt Bf 109 fighters for the Luftwaffe. In order to expand Czechoslovakia's fighter complement beyond the three squadrons of Spitfires transferred from the UK, Avia continued building the Bf 109 as the Avia S-99.

However, an industrial accident soon destroyed Avia's remaining stock of Daimler-Benz DB 605 aircraft engines, so Avia substituted the Junkers Jumo 211 engine and associated propeller. The resulting hybrid aircraft was called the Avia S-199. The Jumo engine and propeller had been made for medium bombers and had the wrong performance characteristics for a fighter aircraft. This gave the S-199 poor handling, particularly during take-off and landing. Production ended in 1949 and Czechoslovakia withdrew its last S-199 aircraft from service in 1957.

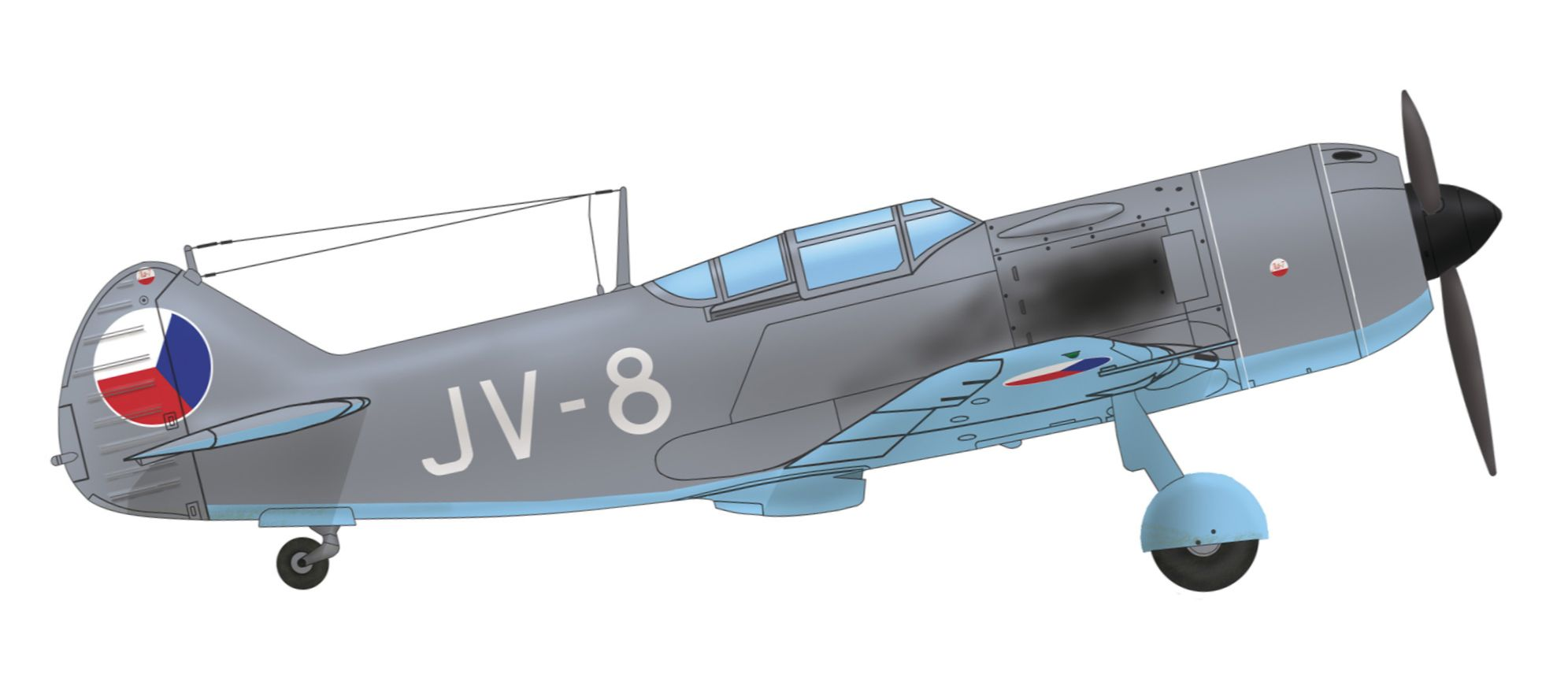
Lavochkin La-7 of the 2nd flight, 1st fighter air regiment, 4th air division in 1947

From 1945 the Air Force also had 56 Soviet-built Lavochkin La-7 fighters, which were quicker and manœuvred better than the Bf 109 and S-199.

The Czechoslovak aircraft industry continued to produce single-seat (Avia S-92) and two-seat (Avia CS-92) variants of Germany's jet fighter the Messerschmidt Me 262 after World War II. From August 1946, a total of nine S-92s and three two-seater CS-92s were completed and test flown. They were introduced in 1947 and in 1950 were supplied to the 5th Fighter Squadron, becoming the first jet fighters to serve in the Czechoslovak Air Force. These were kept flying until 1951, when they were replaced in service by Soviet jet fighters. Both versions are on display at the Prague Aviation museum in Kbely.

=== Under Communism 1948–1989 ===
The Spitfires were Czechoslovakia's primary fighter aircraft until the 1948 Czechoslovak coup d'état, after which the Communist Party of Czechoslovakia purged air force personnel who had served in the RAF. Many ex-RAF personnel, including Air Marshal Janoušek and Hawker Hurricane pilot Josef Bryks, were tried on false charges and given long prison sentences. Czechoslovakia sold all its Spitfires to the nascent Israel in 1948, in a secret arms and military training deal.

In 1955 Czechoslovakia became a founder member of the Warsaw Pact. The Czechoslovak Air Force was equipped with Soviet aircraft and followed its doctrines and tactics. Mostly Mikoyan-Gurevich aircraft (MiGs) were bought. MiG-15, MiG-19, and MiG-21F fighters were produced under licence; in the 1970s, MiG-23MF were acquired, followed by MiG−23MLs and MiG-29s in the 1980s.

In 1951 the 1st, 2nd, and 3rd Air Defence Districts of State Territory were created, at about the same time as the creation of the 15th Fighter Air Corps. The 15th Fighter Air Corps controlled the 1st, 3rd, 5th, and 166th Fighter Air Divisions at various times; the 166th Fighter Air Division later became the 2nd Fighter Air Division. From 1964 to 1969 the 10th Air Army included the 46th Transport Air Division, of two regiments of helicopters and a transport regiment.

The 11th Radio Technical Security Battalion (Czech: 11. prapor radiotechnického zabezpečení; cover number: VÚ 5960) was established on 1 September 1963 by the renaming of the 11th Ground Navigation Security Battalion, as part of the Air Force. From its inception until 15 October 1968, it was deployed at the Tri Duby Airport near Sliač, subsequently, until 1 September 1973, it was deployed at the Piešťany Airport, and from 1 September 1973 until 1 September 1992 at the Přerov Airport.

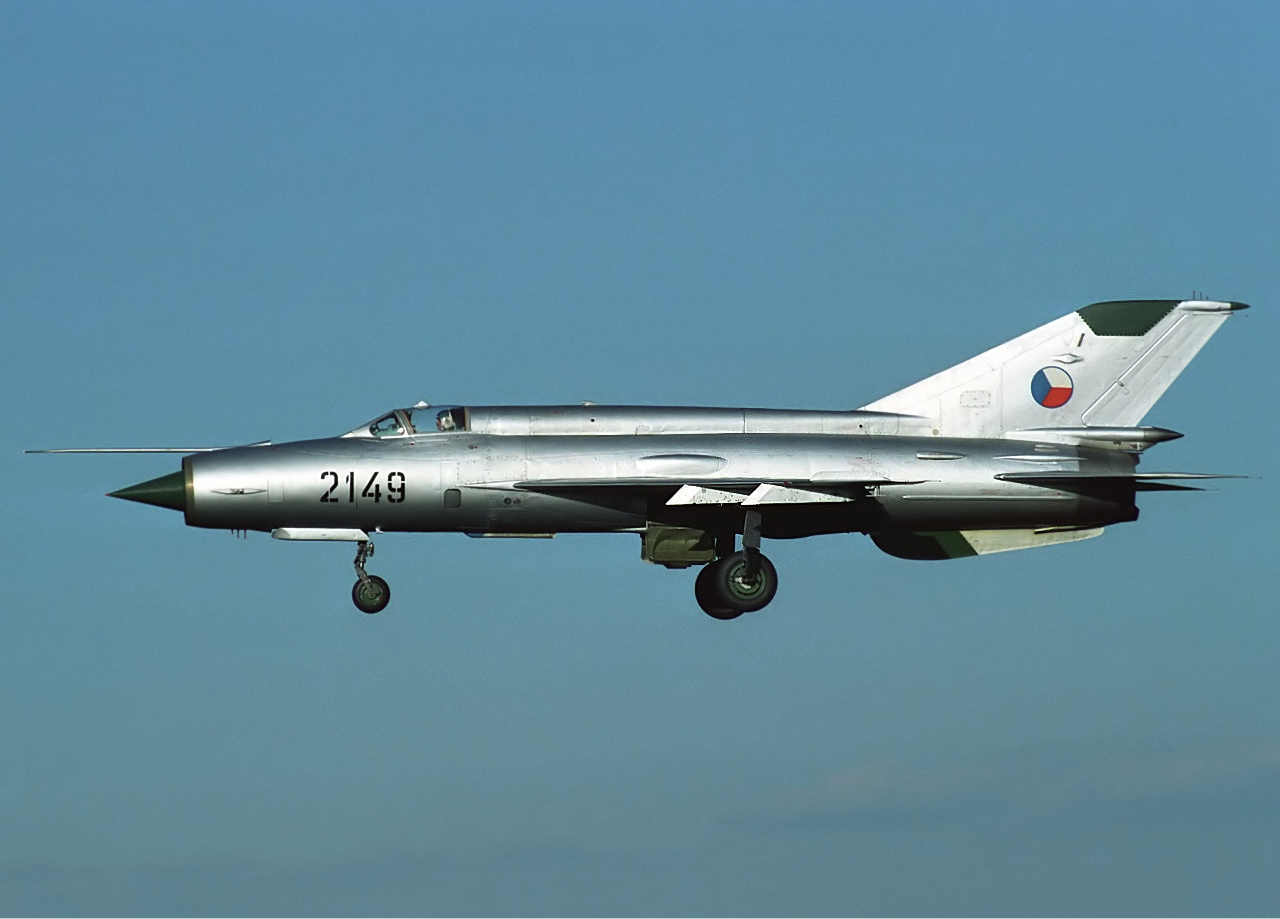
Czechoslovak MiG-21R 'Fishbed'

In May 1987 two Czechoslovak Air Force jets were scrambled to try to bring down a Czechoslovak engineer attempting to escape his home country via a home-built ultralight aircraft. After flying about 10 miles (16 km) to the West German border, the refugee's aircraft ran out of fuel, and he landed safely in a Bavarian forest, just before the Czechoslovak fighters could intercept him.

In the 1980s and early 1990s the Czechoslovak Air Force consisted of the state air defence command, with air defence fighters, surface to air missiles, and air defence radars, and the 10th Air Army, responsible for ground forces support. The state air defence command had 2nd Air Defence Division (Brno) with 8th Fighter Air Regiment, radars, and surface to air missiles, and the 3rd Air Defence Division (Žatec) with the 1st (České Budějovice), 5th (Dobřany), and 11th Fighter Air Regiments (Žatec), and the 71st Anti-Aircraft Missile Brigade and 185th Anti-Aircraft Missile Regiment. 8th Fighter Air Regiment was based at (Ostrava) (Mošnov) from 1959 until 1 April 1985, whereupon it relocated to Brno (Tuřany). It was equipped with the MiG-21 from 1965 to 1991. 1st Fighter Air Regiment at České Budějovice was equipped with MiG-21s from 1964, and was disbanded in 1992.

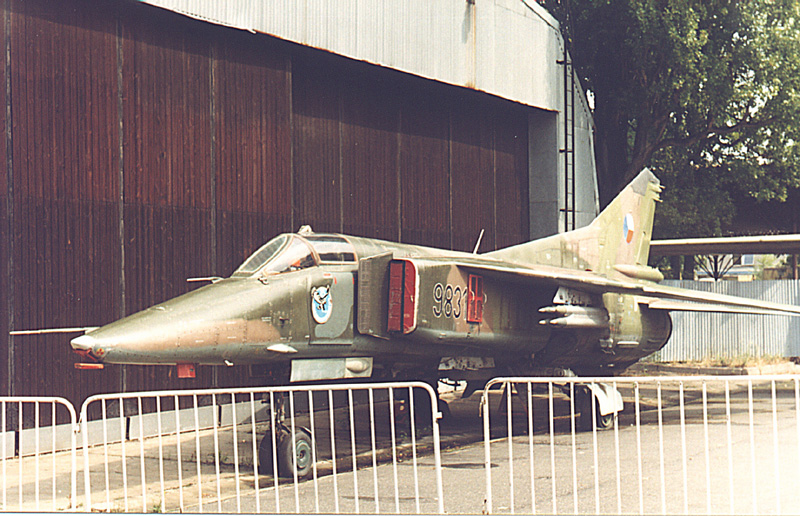
Czechoslovak MiG-23BN at Prague Aviation Museum

The 10th Air Army had two air divisions and a total of six regiments of fighters and attack aircraft. There were also two reconnaissance regiments, two transport regiments, three training regiments, and two helicopter regiments. In 1990 the 10th Air Army, with headquarters at Hradec Králové, comprised the 1st Fighter Air Division (HQ Bechyně, included the 9th Fighter Air Regiment at the same base until 30 June 1990), the 34th Fighter Bomber Air Division (HQ Čáslav, which Air International in July 1991 reported as comprising the 6th & 20th (Su-22), and 28 (MiG-23BN) FB Regiments, plus the 9th Air Defence Regiment with MiG-21bis), the 47th Reconnaissance Air Regiment (Ostrava-Mošnov), the 10th Signal Regiment, the 11th Helicopter Regiment, the 1st Composite Transport Air Regiment, and the 30th Attack Air Regiment (Pardubice Airport, with Su-25Ks). It was disbanded on 1 October 1990 and succeeded by the 1st Mixed Air Corps.

Between 1945 and 1968 the Czechoslovak Air Force operated several regiments from Hradčany airfield:

- 46 Bomber Division (46. letecká bombardovací divize) between 1951 and 1955.
- 24 Bomber Regiment (24. letecký bombardovací pluk) between 1952 and 1954.
- 25 Bomber Regiment (25. letecký bombardovací pluk) between 1952 and 1954.
- 17 Fighter Regiment (17. stíhací letecký pluk) between 1955 and 1964.
- 26 Fighter Regiment (26. stíhací letecký pluk) between 1956 and 1958.
- 30 Fighter-Bomber Regiment (30. stíhací bombardovací letecký pluk) between 1958 and 1959.
- 2 Fighter-Bomber Regiment (2. stíhací bombardovací letecký pluk) between 1964 and 1968.

=== State Air Defence, 1980s ===
Reportedly from January 1976, the 7th Air Army was disbanded and replaced by the State Air Defence Command with the 2nd and 3rd Air Defence Divisions, which existed until 1990. The State Air Defence Command moved from Prague to Stará Boleslav in 1981.

The details are based on the Czech Ministerstvo narodni obrany website, which lists all units of the Czechoslovak People's Army in existence between 1954 and 1989, with their location, subordination, equipment and changes over time.

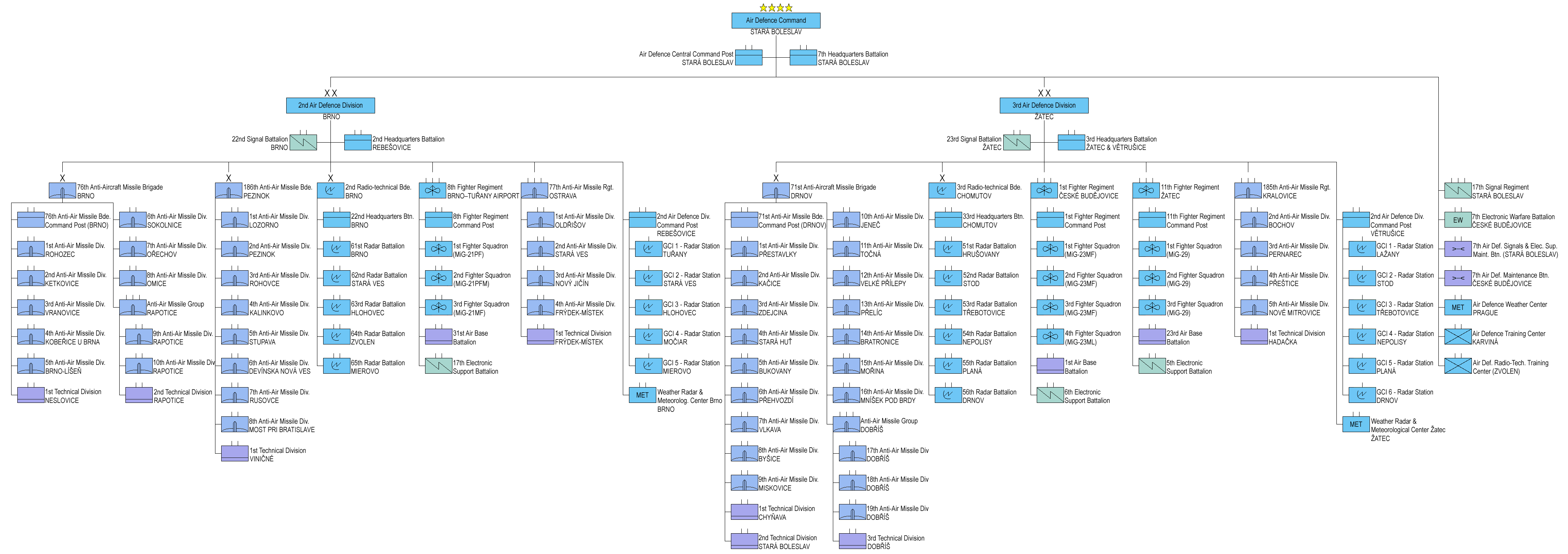
Air Defence Command Structure in 1989 (click to enlarge)

- Air Defence Command in Stará Boleslav (named: 7th Air Defence Army until 1976)
  - Air Defence Central Command Post in Stará Boleslav
  - 7th Headquarters Battalion in Stará Boleslav
  - 17th Signal Regiment in Stará Boleslav
  - 7th Electronic Warfare Battalion in České Budějovice
    - Command and Control Company
    - On-board Radar Jammer Company
    - Radio Navigation and VHF Signal Jammer Company
  - 7th Air Defence Signals and Electronic Support Maintenance Battalion in Stará Boleslav
  - 7th Air Defence Maintenance Battalion in České Budějovice
  - Air Defence Weather Center in Prague
    - Slovakia Weather Forecasting Center in Bratislava
  - Air Defence Training Center in Karviná training troops for anti-aircraft missile units
  - Air Defence Radio-technical Training Center in Zvolen training troops for radio-technical units

==== 2nd Air Defence Division ====
- 2nd Air Defence Division in Brno
  - 2nd Air Defence Division Command Post in Rebešovice
    - Ground Control Intercept 1 - Tuřany radar station
    - Ground Control Intercept 2 - Stará Ves nad Ondřejnicí radar station
    - Ground Control Intercept 3 - Hlohovec radar station
    - Ground Control Intercept 4 - Močiar radar station
    - Ground Control Intercept 5 - Mierovo radar station
  - 2nd Headquarters Battalion in Rebešovice
  - 8th Fighter Regiment at Brno–Tuřany Airport
    - 8th Fighter Regiment Command Post
    - 1st Fighter Squadron flying MiG-21PF
    - 2nd Fighter Squadron flying MiG-21PF
    - 3rd Fighter Squadron flying MiG-21PFM
    - 31st Air Base Battalion
    - 17th Electronic Support Battalion
  - 76th Anti-Aircraft Missile Brigade in Brno defending the city of Brno
    - 76th Anti-Aircraft Missile Brigade Command Post at Brno–Tuřany Airport
    - 1st Anti-Aircraft Missile Division in Rohozec with S-75M Volkhov high-altitude air defence systems
    - 2nd Anti-Aircraft Missile Division in Ketkovice with S-75M Volkhov high-altitude air defence systems
    - 3rd Anti-Aircraft Missile Division in Vranovice with S-75M Volkhov high-altitude air defence systems
    - 4th Anti-Aircraft Missile Division in Kobeřice u Brna with S-75M Volkhov high-altitude air defence systems
    - 5th Anti-Aircraft Missile Division in Brno-Líšeň with S-125 Neva mobile air defence systems
    - 6th Anti-Aircraft Missile Division in Sokolnice with S-125 Neva mobile air defence systems
    - 7th Anti-Aircraft Missile Division in Ořechov with S-125 Neva mobile air defence systems
    - 8th Anti-Aircraft Missile Division in Omice with S-125 Neva mobile air defence systems
    - 1st Technical Division in Neslovice
    - Anti-Aircraft Missile Group of the 76th Anti-Aircraft Missile Brigade in Rapotice
      - 9th Anti-Aircraft Missile Division in Rapotice with S-200 Vega long range air defence systems
      - 10th Anti-Aircraft Missile Division in Rapotice with S-200 Vega long range air defence systems
      - 2nd Technical Division in Rapotice
  - 77th Anti-Aircraft Missile Regiment in Ostrava defending the city of Ostrava
    - 1st Anti-Aircraft Missile Division in Oldřišov with S-75M Volkhov high-altitude air defence systems
    - 2nd Anti-Aircraft Missile Division in Stará Ves nad Ondřejnicí with S-75M Volkhov high-altitude air defence systems
    - 3rd Anti-Aircraft Missile Division in Nový Jičín with S-75M Volkhov high-altitude air defence systems
    - 4th Anti-Aircraft Missile Division in Frýdek-Místek with S-75M Volkhov high-altitude air defence systems
    - 1st Technical Division in Frýdek-Místek
  - 186th Anti-Aircraft Missile Brigade in Pezinok defending the city of Bratislava
    - 1st Anti-Aircraft Missile Division in Lozorno with S-75M Volkhov high-altitude air defence systems
    - 2nd Anti-Aircraft Missile Division in Pezinok with S-75M Volkhov high-altitude air defence systems
    - 3rd Anti-Aircraft Missile Division in Rohovce with S-75M Volkhov high-altitude air defence systems
    - 4th Anti-Aircraft Missile Division in Kalinkovo with S-75M Volkhov high-altitude air defence systems
    - 5th Anti-Aircraft Missile Division in Stupava with S-75M Volkhov high-altitude air defence systems
    - 6th Anti-Aircraft Missile Division in Devínska Nová Ves with S-75M Volkhov high-altitude air defence systems
    - 7th Anti-Aircraft Missile Division in Rusovce with S-125 Neva mobile air defence systems
    - 8th Anti-Aircraft Missile Division in Most pri Bratislave with S-125 Neva mobile air defence systems
    - 1st Technical Division in Viničné
  - 2nd Radio-technical Brigade in Brno
    - 22nd Headquarters Battalion in Brno
    - 61st Radar Battalion in Brno
      - Command Post of 61st Electronic Battalion in Brno-Tuřany
      - Command Company in Sokolnice
      - 610th Radar Company in Sokolnice operating the Tuřany radar station
      - 611th Mobile Radar Company in Moravské Budějovice
      - 612th Mobile Radar Company in Božice
      - 613th Mobile Radar Company in Lavičky
    - 62nd Radar Battalion in Stará Ves nad Ondřejnicí
      - Command Post of 62nd Electronic Battalion in Stará Ves nad Ondřejnicí
      - Command Company in Stará Ves nad Ondřejnicí
      - 620th Radar Company in Stará Ves nad Ondřejnicí operating the Stará Ves nad Ondřejnicí radar station
      - 621st Mobile Radar Company in Chropyně
      - 622nd Mobile Radar Company in Polička
    - 63rd Radar Battalion in Hlohovec
      - Command Post of 63rd Electronic Battalion in Hlohovec
      - Command Company in Hlohovec
      - 630th Radar Company in Hlohovec operating the Hlohovec radar station
      - 631st Mobile Radar Company in Starý Hrozenkov
      - 632nd Mobile Radar Company in Šurany
    - 64th Radar Battalion in Zvolen
      - Command Post of 64th Electronic Battalion in Močiar
      - Command Company in Zvolen
      - 640th Radar Company in Močiar operating the Močiar radar station
      - 641st Mobile Radar Company in Cerovo
      - 642nd Mobile Radar Company in Veľká Ida
    - 65th Radar Battalion in Mierovo
      - Command Post of 65th Electronic Battalion in Mierovo
      - Command Company in Mierovo
      - 650th Radar Company in Mierovo operating the Mierovo radar station
      - 651st Mobile Radar Company in Moravská Nová Ves
      - 652nd Mobile Radar Company in Zohor
      - 653rd Mobile Radar Company in Rusovce
  - 22nd Signal Battalion in Brno
  - Weather Radar and Meteorological Center Brno

==== 3rd Air Defence Division ====
- 3rd Air Defence Division in Žatec
  - 3rd Air Defence Division Command Post in Větrušice
    - Ground Control Intercept 1 - Lažany radar station
    - Ground Control Intercept 2 - Stod radar station
    - Ground Control Intercept 3 - Třebotovice radar station
    - Ground Control Intercept 4 - Nepolisy radar station
    - Ground Control Intercept 5 - Planá radar station
    - Ground Control Intercept 6 - Drnov radar station
  - 3rd Headquarters Battalion in Žatec and Větrušice
  - 1st Fighter Regiment in České Budějovice
    - 1st Fighter Regiment Command Post
    - 1st Fighter Squadron flying MiG-23MF
    - 2nd Fighter Squadron flying MiG-23MF
    - 3rd Fighter Squadron flying MiG-23MF
    - 4th Fighter Squadron flying MiG-23ML
    - 1st Air Base Battalion
    - 6th Electronic Support Battalion
  - 11th Fighter Regiment in Žatec
    - 11th Fighter Regiment Command Post
    - 1st Fighter Squadron flying MiG-29
    - 2nd Fighter Squadron flying MiG-29
    - 3rd Fighter Squadron flying MiG-29
    - 23rd Air Base Battalion
    - 5th Electronic Support Battalion
  - 71st Anti-Aircraft Missile Brigade in Drnov defending the Central Bohemian Region with the capital Prague
    - 71st Anti-Aircraft Missile Brigade Command Post in Drnov
    - 1st Anti-Aircraft Missile Division in Přestavlky with S-75M Volkhov high-altitude air defence systems
    - 2nd Anti-Aircraft Missile Division in Kačice with S-75M Volkhov high-altitude air defence systems
    - 3rd Anti-Aircraft Missile Division in Zdejcina with S-75M Volkhov high-altitude air defence systems
    - 4th Anti-Aircraft Missile Division in Stará Huť with S-75M Volkhov high-altitude air defence systems
    - 5th Anti-Aircraft Missile Division in Bukovany with S-75M Volkhov high-altitude air defence systems
    - 6th Anti-Aircraft Missile Division in Přehvozdí with S-75M Volkhov high-altitude air defence systems
    - 7th Anti-Aircraft Missile Division in Vlkava with S-75M Volkhov high-altitude air defence systems
    - 8th Anti-Aircraft Missile Division in Byšice with S-75M Volkhov high-altitude air defence systems
    - 9th Anti-Aircraft Missile Division in Miskovice with S-125 Neva mobile air defence systems
    - 10th Anti-Aircraft Missile Division in Jeneč with S-125 Neva mobile air defence systems
    - 11th Anti-Aircraft Missile Division in Točná with S-125 Neva mobile air defence systems
    - 12th Anti-Aircraft Missile Division in Velké Přílepy with S-125 Neva mobile air defence systems
    - 13th Anti-Aircraft Missile Division in Přelíc with S-125 Neva mobile air defence systems
    - 14th Anti-Aircraft Missile Division in Bratronice with S-125 Neva mobile air defence systems
    - 15th Anti-Aircraft Missile Division in Mořina with S-125 Neva mobile air defence systems
    - 16th Anti-Aircraft Missile Division in Mníšek pod Brdy with S-125 Neva mobile air defence systems
    - 1st Technical Division in Chyňava
    - 2nd Technical Division in Stará Boleslav
    - Anti-Aircraft Missile Group of the 71st Anti-Aircraft Missile Brigade in Dobříš
      - 17th Anti-Aircraft Missile Division in Dobříš with S-200 Vega long range air defence systems
      - 18th Anti-Aircraft Missile Division in Dobříš with S-200 Vega long range air defence systems
      - 19th Anti-Aircraft Missile Division in Dobříš with S-200 Vega long range air defence systems
      - 3rd Technical Division in Dobříš
  - 185th Anti-Aircraft Missile Regiment in Kralovice defending the city of Plzeň
    - 2nd Anti-Aircraft Missile Division in Bochov with S-75M Volkhov high-altitude air defence systems
    - 3rd Anti-Aircraft Missile Division in Pernarec with S-75M Volkhov high-altitude air defence systems
    - 4th Anti-Aircraft Missile Division in Přeštice with S-75M Volkhov high-altitude air defence systems
    - 5th Anti-Aircraft Missile Division in Nové Mitrovice with S-75M Volkhov high-altitude air defence systems
    - 1st Technical Division in Hadačka
  - 3rd Radio-technical Brigade in Chomutov
    - 33rd Headquarters Battalion in Chomutov
    - 51st Radar Battalion in Hrušovany
      - Command Post of 51st Electronic Battalion in Lažany
      - Command Company in Lažany
      - 510th Radar Company Lažany operating the Lažany radar station
      - 511th Mobile Radar Company in Mikulášovice
      - 512th Mobile Radar Company in Martiněves
    - 52nd Radar Battalion in Stod
      - Command Post of 52nd Electronic Battalion in Stod
      - Command Company in Stod
      - 520th Radar Company in Stod operating the Stod radar station
      - 521st Mobile Radar Company in Poleň
      - 522nd Mobile Radar Company in Zhůří
      - 523rd Mobile Radar Company in Katovice
    - 53rd Radar Battalion in Třebotovice
      - Command Post of 53rd Electronic Battalion in Třebotovice
      - Command Company in Třebotovice
      - 530th Radar Company in Třebotovice operating the Třebotovice radar station
      - 531st Mobile Radar Company in Třeboň
      - 532nd Mobile Radar Company in Přední Výtoň
      - 533rd Mobile Radar Company in Horní Vltavice
      - 534th Mobile Radar Company in Nová Bystřice
    - 54th Radar Battalion in Nepolisy
      - Command Post of 54th Electronic Battalion in Nepolisy
      - Command Company in Nepolisy
      - 540th Radar Company in Nepolisy operating the Nepolisy radar station
      - 541st Mobile Radar Company in Chrášťany
      - 542nd Mobile Radar Company in Senožaty
      - 543rd Mobile Radar Company in Adršpach
    - 55th Radar Battalion in Planá
      - Command Post of 55th Electronic Battalion in Planá
      - Command Company in Planá
      - 550th Radar Company in Planá operating the Planá radar station
      - 551st Mobile Radar Company in Aš
      - 552nd Mobile Radar Company in Hřebečná
    - 56th Radar Battalion in Drnov
      - Command Post of 56th Electronic Battalion in Drnov
      - Command Company in Drnov
      - 560th Radar Company in Drnov operating the Drnov radar station
      - 561st Mobile Radar Company in Jesenice
      - 562nd Mobile Radar Company in Břasy
      - 563rd Mobile Radar Company in Ratiboř
  - 23rd Signal Battalion in Žatec
  - Weather Radar and Meteorological Center Žatec

=== After Communism 1990–1992 ===
In November and December 1989 the Velvet Revolution ended Communist rule in Czechoslovakia. In 1992 the Slovak Republic voted to leave the federal republic, which was dissolved on 1 January 1993.

The assets of the former air force were divided 2:1 in the Czech favor, and thus the Czech Air Force and the Slovak Air Force were formed. The 18 MiG-29s then in service were divided 1:1 between the new countries.

A 1992–93 reorganisation resulted in a completely new structure of the Czech Air Force which came into effect in 1994. One of the first units which closed down as a direct result of the transfer of a large number of aircraft to Slovakia was the 9th Fighter Bomber Air Regiment (9. SBoLP) at Bechyně.

=== Equipment list ===
- S-102(MiG-15) - 13(Of the 853 aircraft produced in total, 13 were released in their original condition, while the remaining 840 are believed to have been converted into MiG-15SBs.)
- CS-102(MiG-15UTI) - 2013
- S-103(MiG-15bis) - 620
- MiG-15SB - 840(This fighter-bomber variant was created by modifying the S-102, and is easily mistaken for a Soviet-produced version, so caution is advised. It was later released to pro-Soviet countries such as Iraq(reference).)
- MiG-17F - 30
- S-104 - (MiG-17PF) - 457
- MiG-19P - 27
- MiG-19S - 12
- S-105(MiG-19S) - 103
- MiG-19PM - 33
- S-106(MiG-21F-13) - 194
- MiG-21PF - 40
- MiG-21PFM - 9
- MiG-21R - 25
- MiG-21MA(MiG-21M) - 24
- MiG-21MF - 102
- MiG-21US - 13
- MiG-21UM - 32
- MiG-23MF - 13
- MiG-23ML - 16
- MiG-23BN - 32
- MiG-23UB - 8
- MiG-29A - 18
- MiG-29UB - 2
- Yak-17 - 1
- Su-7BM - 64
- Su-7BKL - 31
- Su-7U - 7
- Su-22M4 - 49
- Su-22UM3K - 8
- Su-25K - 34
- Su-25UBK - 1
- Il-28 - 90
- Av 14/24 - 4
- Av 14FG - 10
- Av 14T - 10
- Il-14T - 10
- Il-14P - 16
- Il-28RT - 30
- Mi-24D - 38
- Mi-24DU - 2
- Mi-24V - 30
- L-29 - 400
- B-228 - 116
- CB-228 - 116
- An-26Z-1 - 1
- MiG-15 - 36
- Mi-1 -78
- Mi-2B - 93
- Mi-2R - 86
- Mi-4A - 90
- Mi-8T - 98
- Mi-8P - 90
- Mi-17 - 76
- An-2 - 90
- An-2T - 90
- An-12BP - 90
- Il-28U - 90
- An-24A - 90
- An-24B - 90
- An-26 - 89
- Ts-25 - 2
