= Rohozec =

Rohozec may refer to places in the Czech Republic:

- Rohozec (Brno-Country District), a municipality and village in the South Moravian Region
- Rohozec (Kutná Hora District), a municipality and village in the Central Bohemian Region
- Podbořanský Rohozec, a municipality and village in the Ústí nad Labem Region
