= Přelíc =

- Municipality
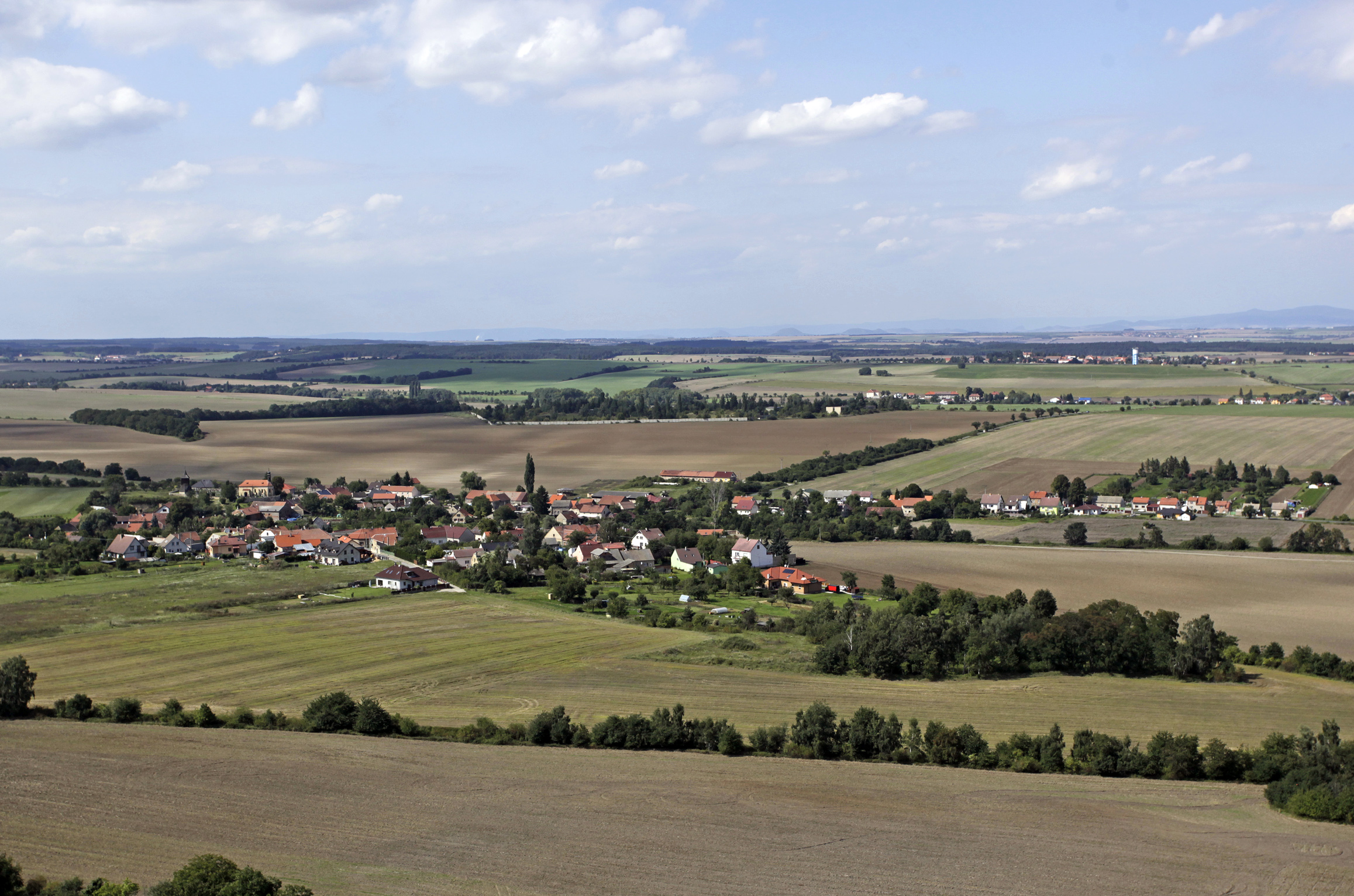
- View from the southeast

- Flag Coat of arms

- Location in the Czech Republic
- Coordinates: 50°12′21″N 14°2′45″E
- Country: Czech Republic
- Region: Central Bohemian
- District: Kladno
- First mentioned: 1352

Area
  - Total: 3.80 km^{2} (1.47 sq mi)
- Elevation: 288 m (945 ft)

Population (2026-01-01)
  - Total: 380
  - Density: 100/km^{2} (260/sq mi)
- Time zone: UTC+1 (CET)
  - Summer (DST): UTC+2 (CEST)
- Postal code: 273 05
- Website: www.ouprelic.cz

Přelíc is a municipality and village in Kladno District in the Central Bohemian Region of the Czech Republic. It has about 400 inhabitants.

== Demographics ==
Historical population
Year	Pop.	±%
1869	368	—
1880	408	+10.9%
1890	510	+25.0%
1900	545	+6.9%
1910	631	+15.8%
1921	635	+0.6%
1930	590	−7.1%
1950	475	−19.5%
1961	418	−12.0%
1970	382	−8.6%
1980	347	−9.2%
1991	263	−24.2%
2001	328	+24.7%
2011	354	+7.9%
2021	401	+13.3%
Source: Censuses
