= Výrov =

- Municipality
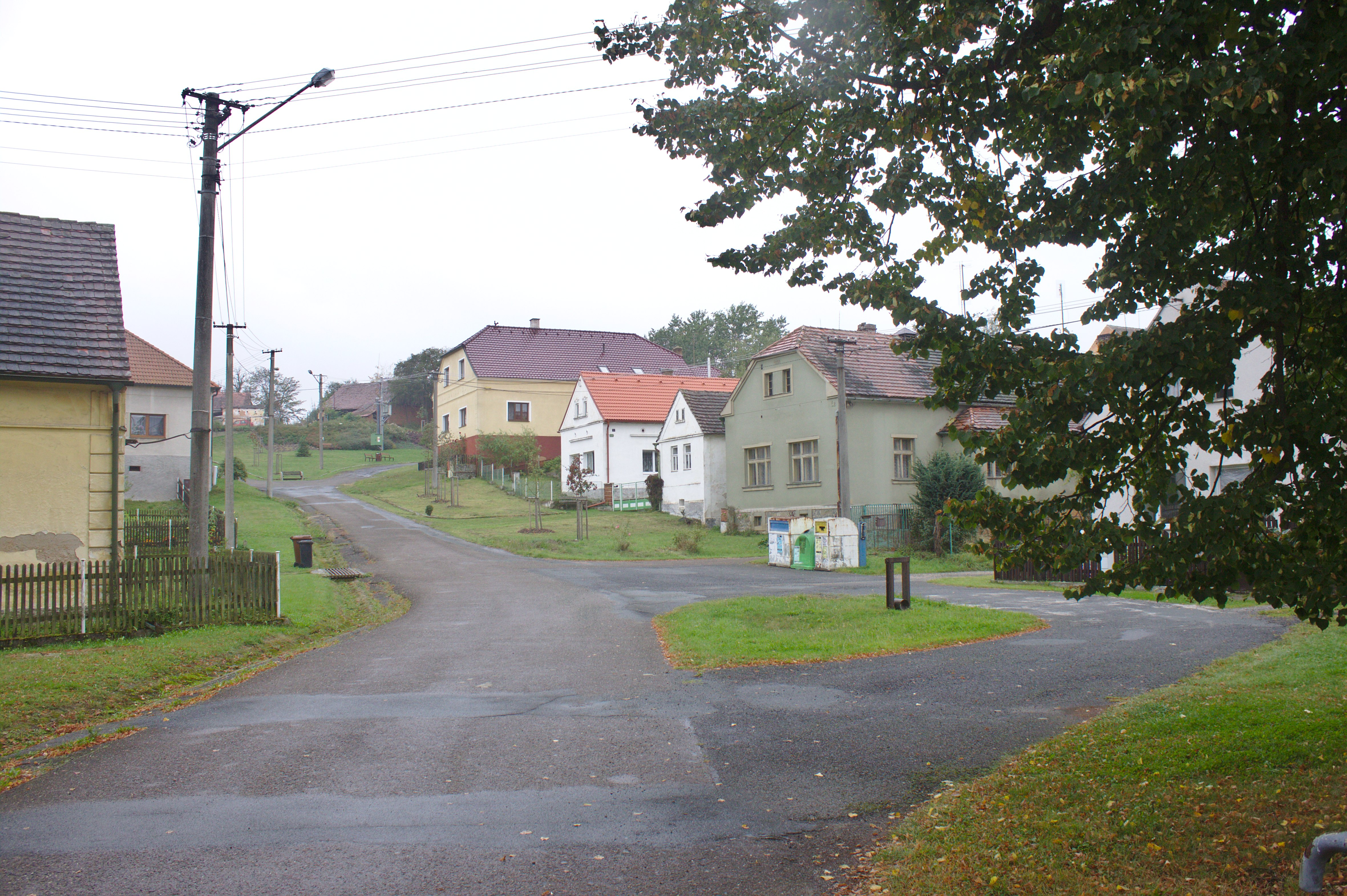
- Crossroads

- Location in the Czech Republic
- Coordinates: 49°57′43″N 13°27′45″E
- Country: Czech Republic
- Region: Plzeň
- District: Plzeň-North
- First mentioned: 1307

Area
  - Total: 9.50 km^{2} (3.67 sq mi)
- Elevation: 448 m (1,470 ft)

Population (2026-01-01)
  - Total: 458
  - Density: 48.2/km^{2} (125/sq mi)
- Time zone: UTC+1 (CET)
  - Summer (DST): UTC+2 (CEST)
- Postal code: 331 41
- Website: www.vyrov.cz

Výrov (German: Wegrow) is a municipality and village in Plzeň-North District in the Plzeň Region of the Czech Republic. It has about 500 inhabitants.

== Administrative division ==
Výrov consists of two municipal parts (in brackets population according to the 2021 census):

- Výrov (82)
- Hadačka (352)

== Geography ==
Výrov is located about 24 kilometres (15 mi) north of Plzeň. It lies in a mainly agricultural landscape in the Plasy Uplands. The highest point is at 511 m (1,677 ft) above sea level.

== Demographics ==
Historical population
Year	Pop.	±%
1869	573	—
1880	567	−1.0%
1890	476	−16.0%
1900	502	+5.5%
1910	569	+13.3%
1921	564	−0.9%
1930	602	+6.7%
1950	443	−26.4%
1961	410	−7.4%
1970	378	−7.8%
1980	374	−1.1%
1991	432	+15.5%
2001	440	+1.9%
2011	451	+2.5%
2021	434	−3.8%
Source: Censuses
