= Neslovice =

- Municipality
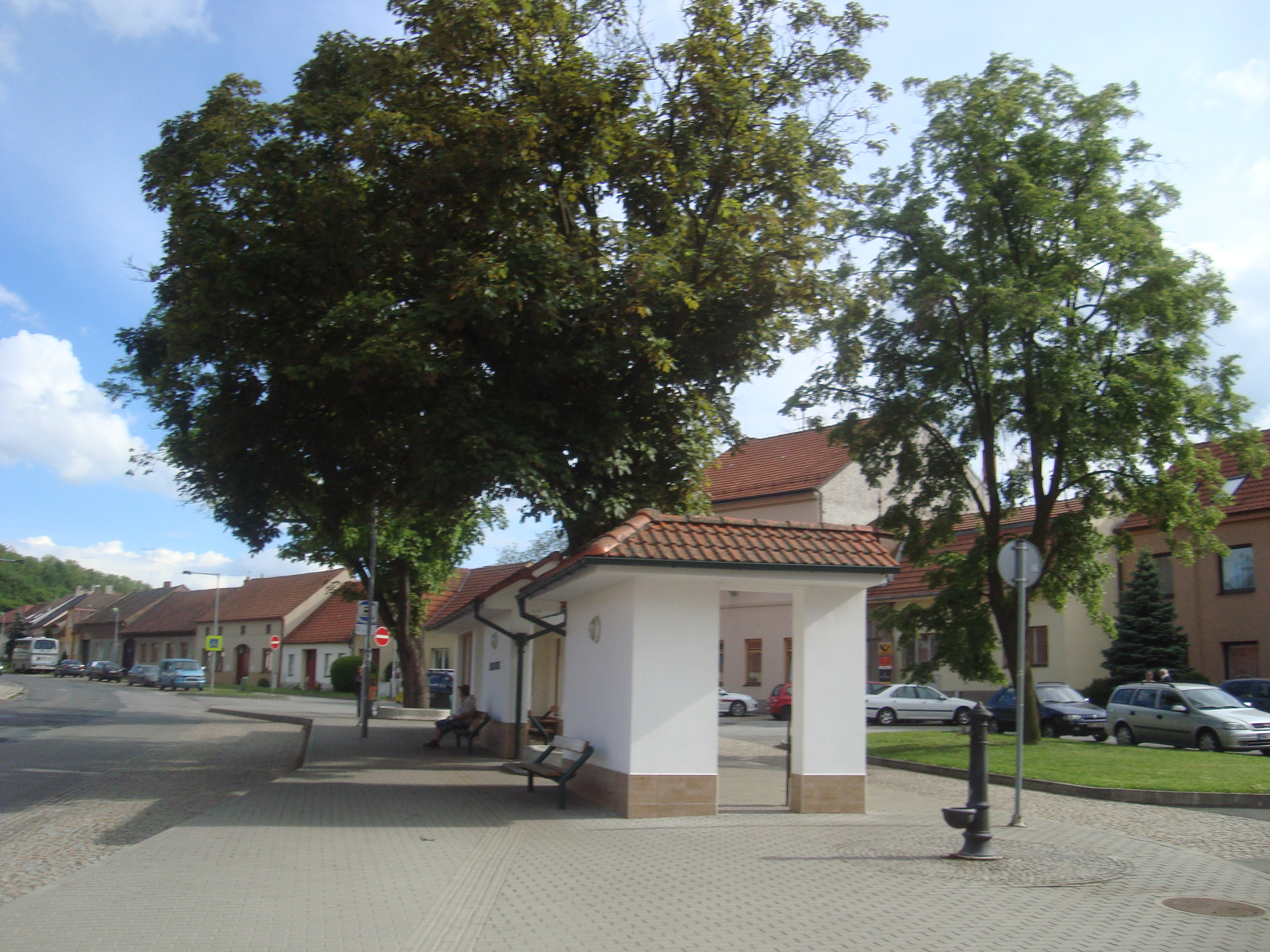
- Centre of Neslovice

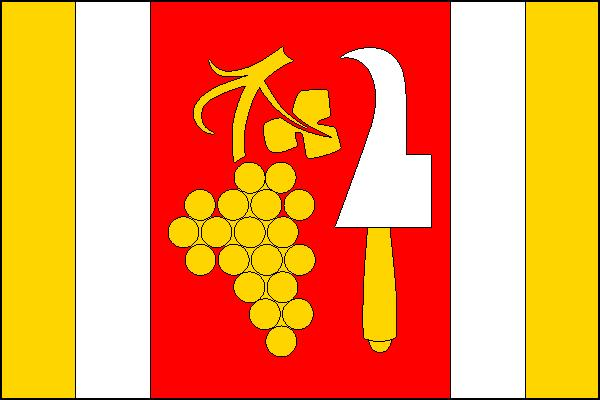
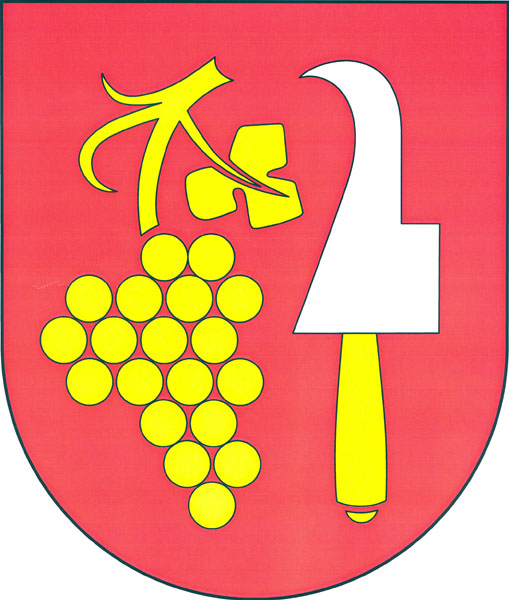
- Flag Coat of arms

- Location in the Czech Republic
- Coordinates: 49°8′32″N 16°23′16″E
- Country: Czech Republic
- Region: South Moravian
- District: Brno-Country
- First mentioned: 1342

Area
  - Total: 5.82 km^{2} (2.25 sq mi)
- Elevation: 338 m (1,109 ft)

Population (2026-01-01)
  - Total: 1,008
  - Density: 173/km^{2} (449/sq mi)
- Time zone: UTC+1 (CET)
  - Summer (DST): UTC+2 (CEST)
- Postal code: 664 91
- Website: www.neslovice.cz

Neslovice is a municipality and village in Brno-Country District in the South Moravian Region of the Czech Republic. It has about 1,000 inhabitants.

== Demographics ==
Historical population
Year	Pop.	±%
1869	549	—
1880	604	+10.0%
1890	720	+19.2%
1900	841	+16.8%
1910	849	+1.0%
1921	888	+4.6%
1930	939	+5.7%
1950	880	−6.3%
1961	863	−1.9%
1970	778	−9.8%
1980	705	−9.4%
1991	722	+2.4%
2001	780	+8.0%
2011	883	+13.2%
2021	919	+4.1%
Source: Censuses
