= Přestavlky (Litoměřice District) =

- Municipality
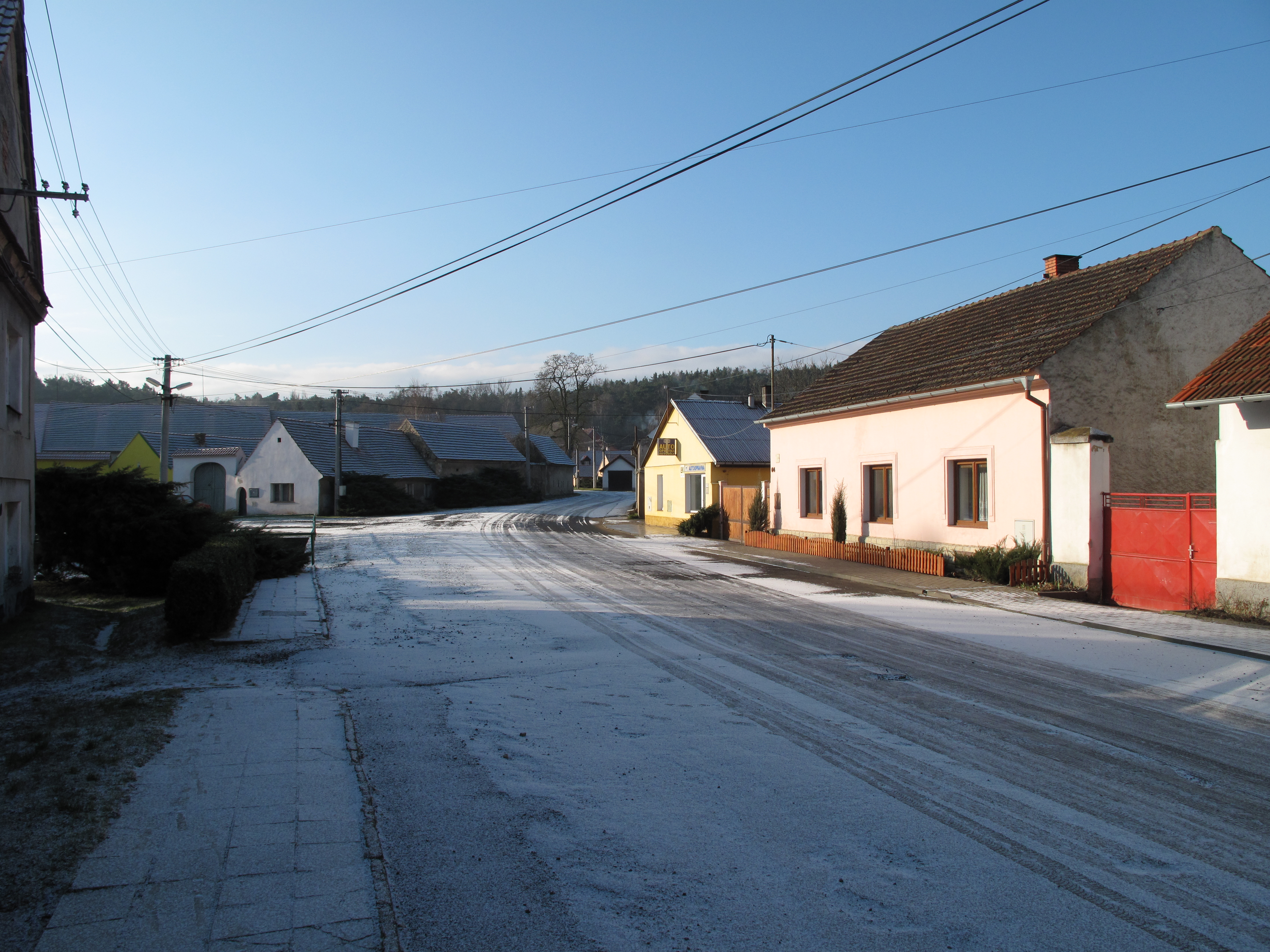
- A street in Přestavlky

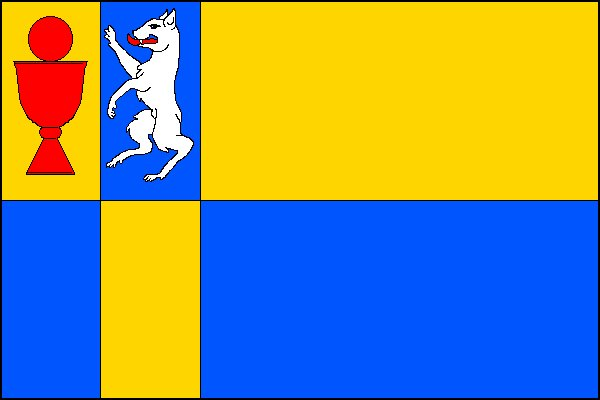
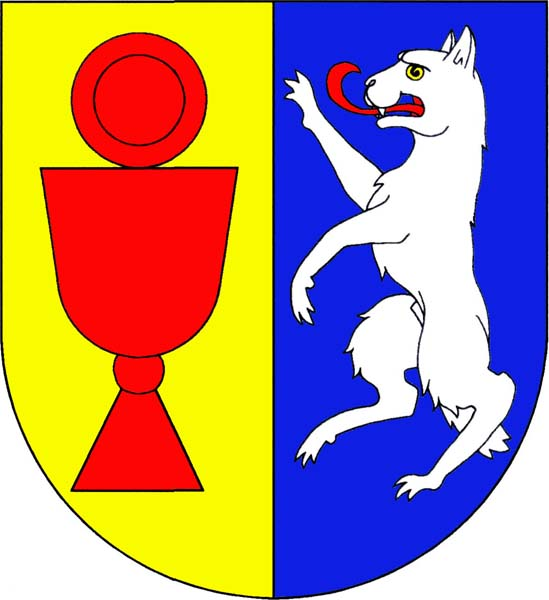
- Flag Coat of arms

- Location in the Czech Republic
- Coordinates: 50°24′13″N 14°11′38″E
- Country: Czech Republic
- Region: Ústí nad Labem
- District: Litoměřice
- First mentioned: 1227

Area
  - Total: 5.62 km^{2} (2.17 sq mi)
- Elevation: 183 m (600 ft)

Population (2026-01-01)
  - Total: 298
  - Density: 53.0/km^{2} (137/sq mi)
- Time zone: UTC+1 (CET)
  - Summer (DST): UTC+2 (CEST)
- Postal code: 413 01
- Website: www.prestavlky-rce.cz

Přestavlky is a municipality and village in Litoměřice District in the Ústí nad Labem Region of the Czech Republic. It has about 300 inhabitants.

Přestavlky lies approximately 17 kilometres (11 mi) south-east of Litoměřice, 32 km (20 mi) south of Ústí nad Labem, and 38 km (24 mi) north-west of Prague.

== Demographics ==
Historical population
Year	Pop.	±%
1869	264	—
1880	279	+5.7%
1890	278	−0.4%
1900	307	+10.4%
1910	363	+18.2%
1921	353	−2.8%
1930	360	+2.0%
1950	269	−25.3%
1961	279	+3.7%
1970	327	+17.2%
1980	284	−13.1%
1991	215	−24.3%
2001	218	+1.4%
2011	246	+12.8%
2021	288	+17.1%
Source: Censuses

== Transport ==
The D8 motorway from Prague to Ústí nad Labem runs through the municipality.
