= Omice =

- Municipality
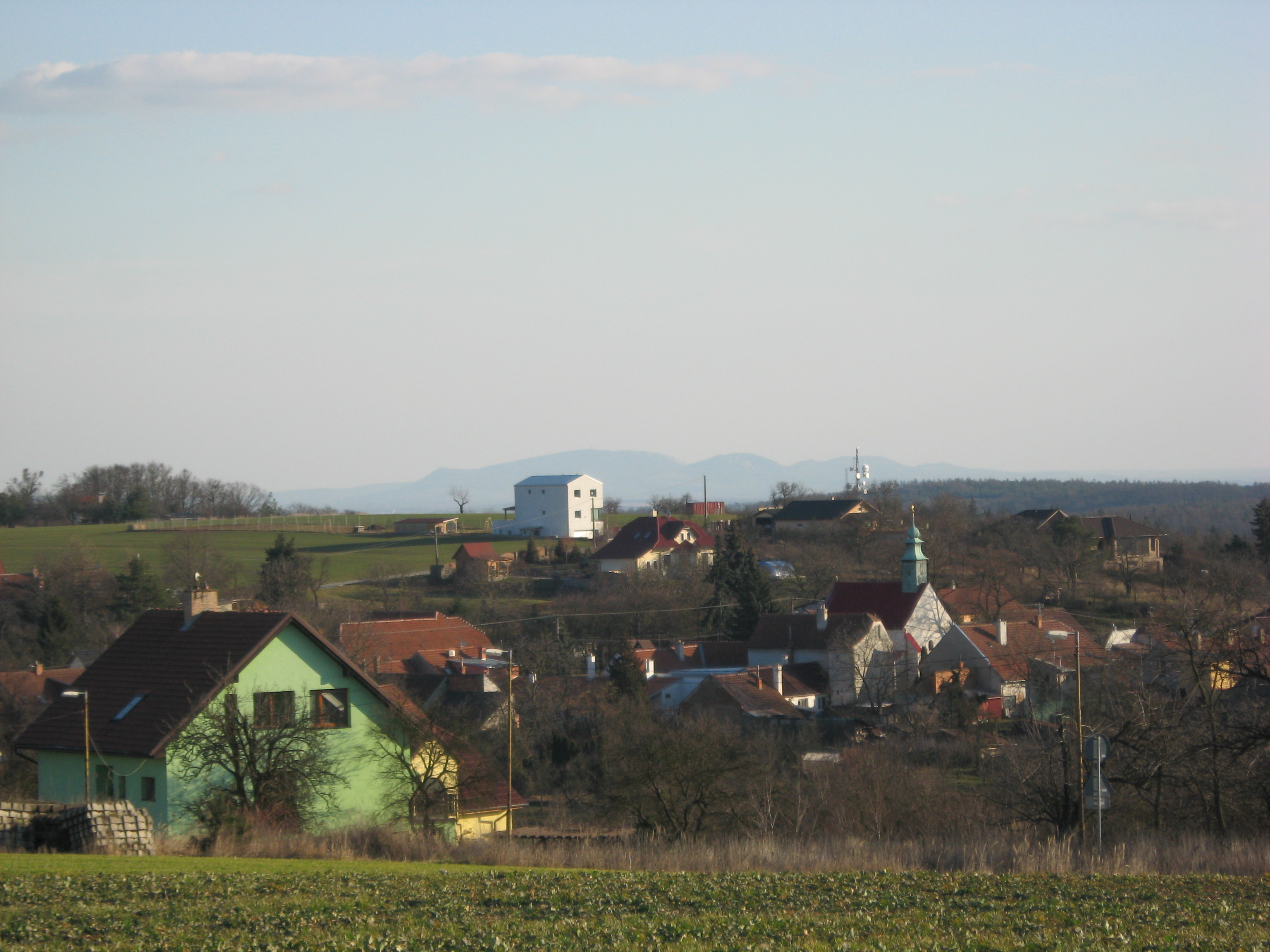
- View towards Omice

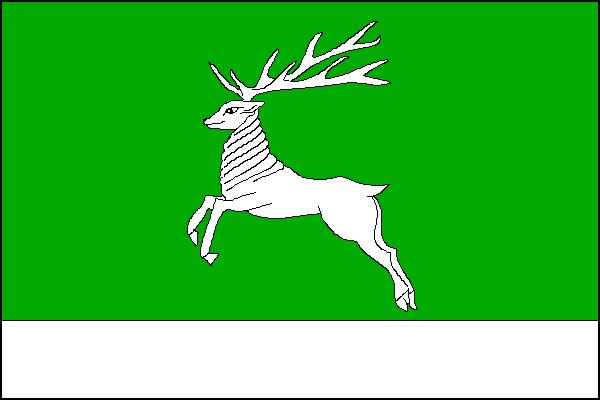
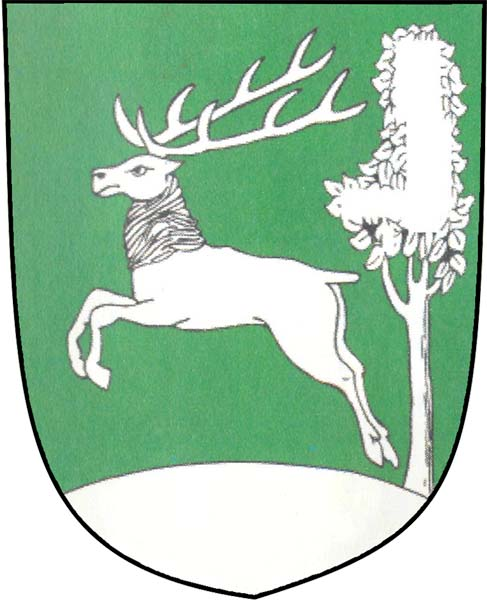
- Flag Coat of arms

- Location in the Czech Republic
- Coordinates: 49°10′12″N 16°27′6″E
- Country: Czech Republic
- Region: South Moravian
- District: Brno-Country
- First mentioned: 1104

Area
  - Total: 10.46 km^{2} (4.04 sq mi)
- Elevation: 385 m (1,263 ft)

Population (2026-01-01)
  - Total: 832
  - Density: 79.5/km^{2} (206/sq mi)
- Time zone: UTC+1 (CET)
  - Summer (DST): UTC+2 (CEST)
- Postal codes: 664 41
- Website: www.omice.cz

Omice is a municipality and village in Brno-Country District in the South Moravian Region of the Czech Republic. It has about 800 inhabitants.

Omice lies approximately 13 kilometres (8 mi) west of Brno and 178 km (111 mi) south-east of Prague.

== Demographics ==
Historical population
Year	Pop.	±%
1869	524	—
1880	558	+6.5%
1890	603	+8.1%
1900	611	+1.3%
1910	628	+2.8%
1921	742	+18.2%
1930	876	+18.1%
1950	794	−9.4%
1961	790	−0.5%
1970	760	−3.8%
1980	643	−15.4%
1991	655	+1.9%
2001	694	+6.0%
2011	758	+9.2%
2021	850	+12.1%
Source: Censuses
