= Větrušice =

- Municipality
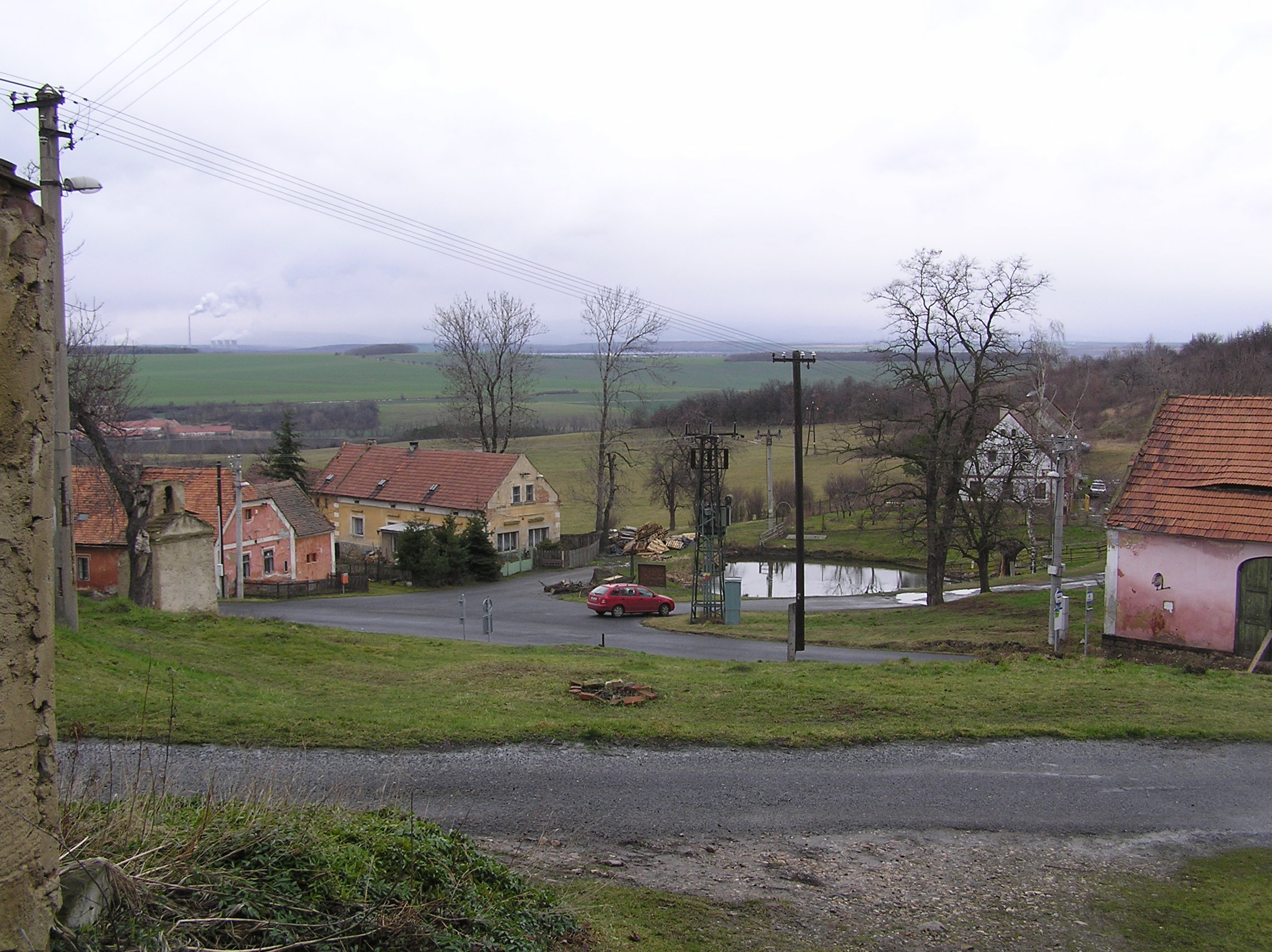
- Centre of Větrušice

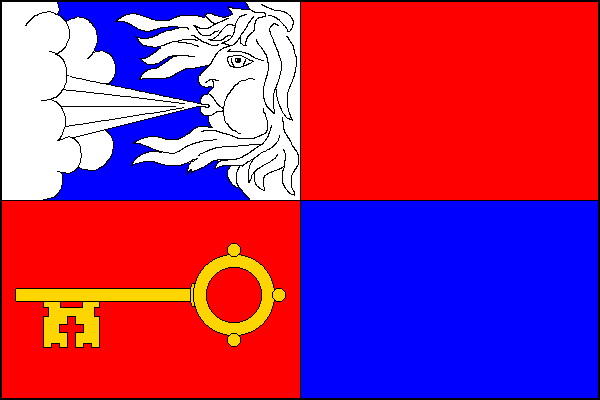
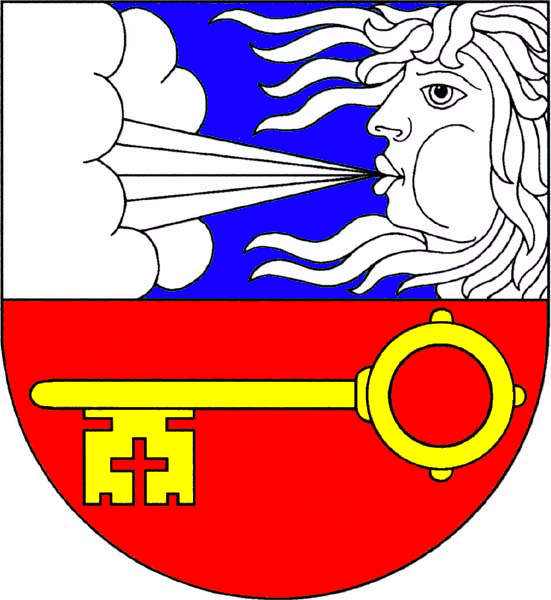
- Flag Coat of arms

- Location in the Czech Republic
- Coordinates: 50°11′27″N 14°23′0″E
- Country: Czech Republic
- Region: Central Bohemian
- District: Prague-East
- First mentioned: 1316

Area
  - Total: 2.86 km^{2} (1.10 sq mi)
- Elevation: 261 m (856 ft)

Population (2026-01-01)
  - Total: 719
  - Density: 251/km^{2} (651/sq mi)
- Time zone: UTC+1 (CET)
  - Summer (DST): UTC+2 (CEST)
- Postal code: 250 67
- Website: www.vetrusice.cz

Větrušice is a municipality and village in Prague-East District in the Central Bohemian Region of the Czech Republic. It has about 700 inhabitants.

== Geography ==
Větrušice is located about 7 kilometres (4 mi) north of Prague. It lies in the Prague Plateau. The municipality is situated on the right bank of the Vltava River.

Along the Vltava there is the Větrušická rokle National Nature Reserve. It is a large complex of steep rocks, rocky ridges, gorges and wooded slopes, where there are diverse communities of dry grasslands and rocky steppes. The reserve has an area of 49.6 ha (123 acres).

== Demographics ==
Historical population
Year	Pop.	±%
1869	164	—
1880	188	+14.6%
1890	223	+18.6%
1900	258	+15.7%
1910	397	+53.9%
1921	397	+0.0%
1930	449	+13.1%
1950	369	−17.8%
1961	359	−2.7%
1970	318	−11.4%
1980	358	+12.6%
1991	332	−7.3%
2001	372	+12.0%
2011	507	+36.3%
2021	645	+27.2%
Source: Censuses
