= Ketkovice =

- Municipality
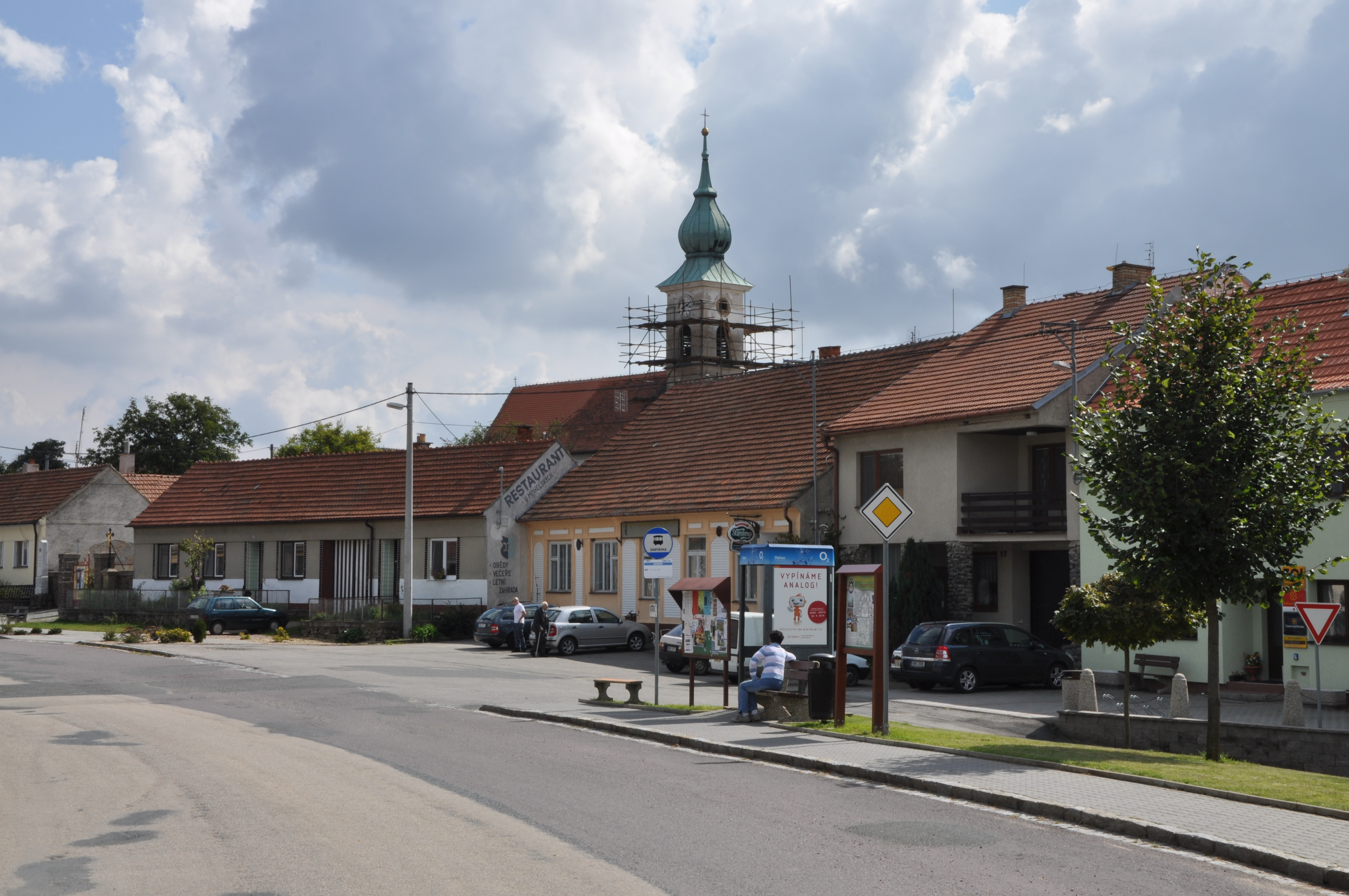
- Centre of Ketkovice

- Flag Coat of arms

- Location in the Czech Republic
- Coordinates: 49°9′33″N 16°15′45″E
- Country: Czech Republic
- Region: South Moravian
- District: Brno-Country
- First mentioned: 1101

Area
  - Total: 9.55 km^{2} (3.69 sq mi)
- Elevation: 433 m (1,421 ft)

Population (2026-01-01)
  - Total: 633
  - Density: 66.3/km^{2} (172/sq mi)
- Time zone: UTC+1 (CET)
  - Summer (DST): UTC+2 (CEST)
- Postal code: 664 91
- Website: www.ketkovice.cz

Ketkovice is a municipality and village in Brno-Country District in the South Moravian Region of the Czech Republic. It has about 600 inhabitants.

Ketkovice lies approximately 26 kilometres (16 mi) west of Brno and 169 km (105 mi) south-east of Prague.

== History ==
The first written mention of Ketkovice is from 1101.

== Demographics ==
Historical population
Year	Pop.	±%
1869	487	—
1880	549	+12.7%
1890	597	+8.7%
1900	667	+11.7%
1910	727	+9.0%
1921	761	+4.7%
1930	822	+8.0%
1950	736	−10.5%
1961	758	+3.0%
1970	835	+10.2%
1980	759	−9.1%
1991	658	−13.3%
2001	619	−5.9%
2011	594	−4.0%
2021	618	+4.0%
Source: Censuses
