= Božice =

- Municipality
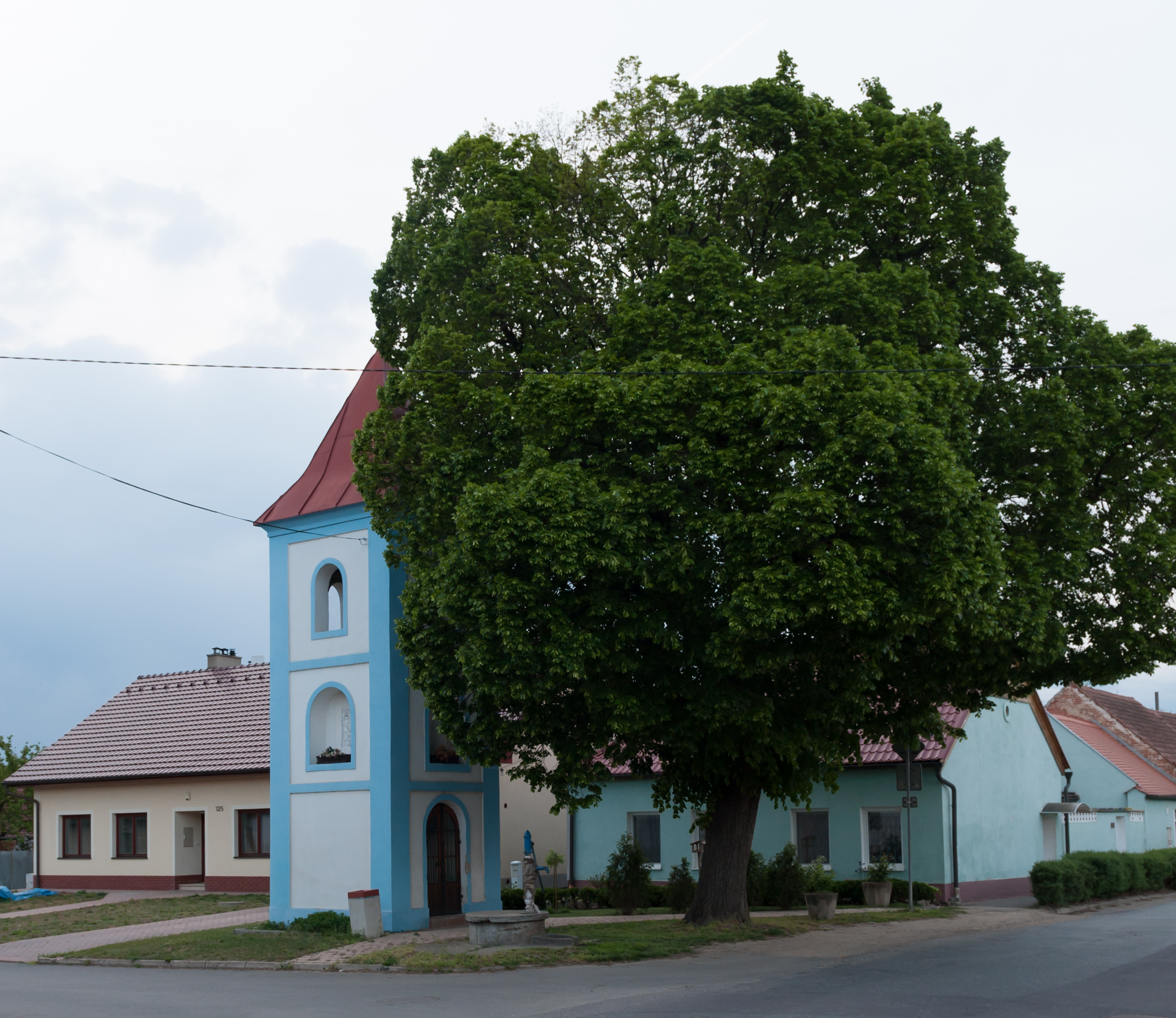
- Belfry in Božice

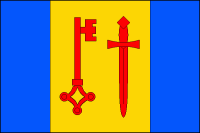
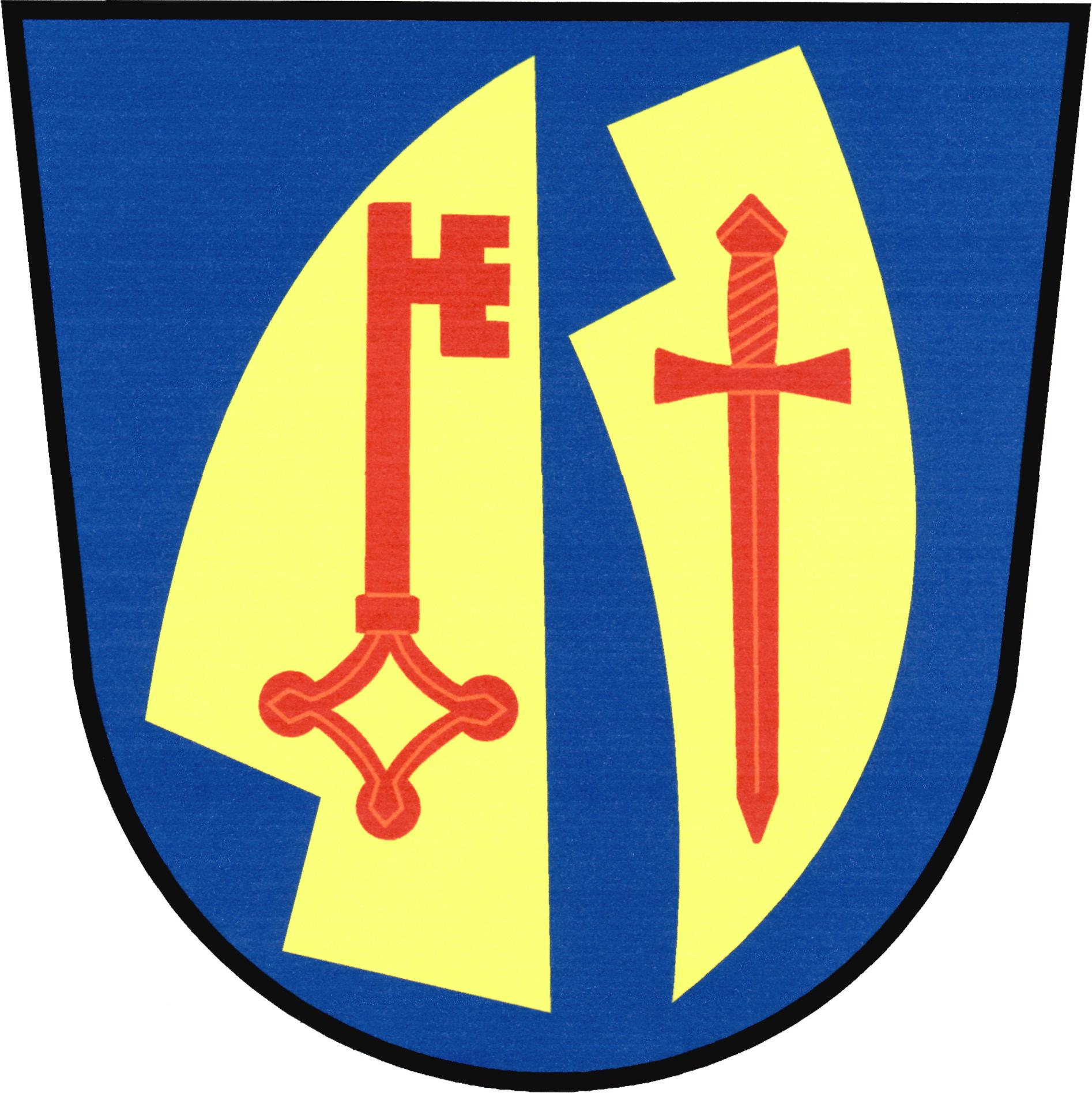
- Flag Coat of arms

- Location in the Czech Republic
- Coordinates: 48°50′13″N 16°17′20″E
- Country: Czech Republic
- Region: South Moravian
- District: Znojmo
- First mentioned: 1225

Area
  - Total: 29.89 km^{2} (11.54 sq mi)
- Elevation: 195 m (640 ft)

Population (2026-01-01)
  - Total: 1,609
  - Density: 53.83/km^{2} (139.4/sq mi)
- Time zone: UTC+1 (CET)
  - Summer (DST): UTC+2 (CEST)
- Postal code: 671 64
- Website: www.bozice.cz

Božice is a municipality and village in Znojmo District in the South Moravian Region of the Czech Republic. It has about 1,600 inhabitants.

Božice lies approximately 19 kilometres (12 mi) east of Znojmo, 47 km (29 mi) south-west of Brno, and 194 km (121 mi) south-east of Prague.

== Demographics ==
Historical population
Year	Pop.	±%
1869	1,899	—
1880	2,136	+12.5%
1890	2,129	−0.3%
1900	2,255	+5.9%
1910	2,300	+2.0%
1921	2,501	+8.7%
1930	2,593	+3.7%
1950	1,366	−47.3%
1961	1,606	+17.6%
1970	1,429	−11.0%
1980	1,362	−4.7%
1991	1,306	−4.1%
2001	1,350	+3.4%
2011	1,525	+13.0%
2021	1,599	+4.9%
Source: Censuses
