= Rapotice =

- Municipality
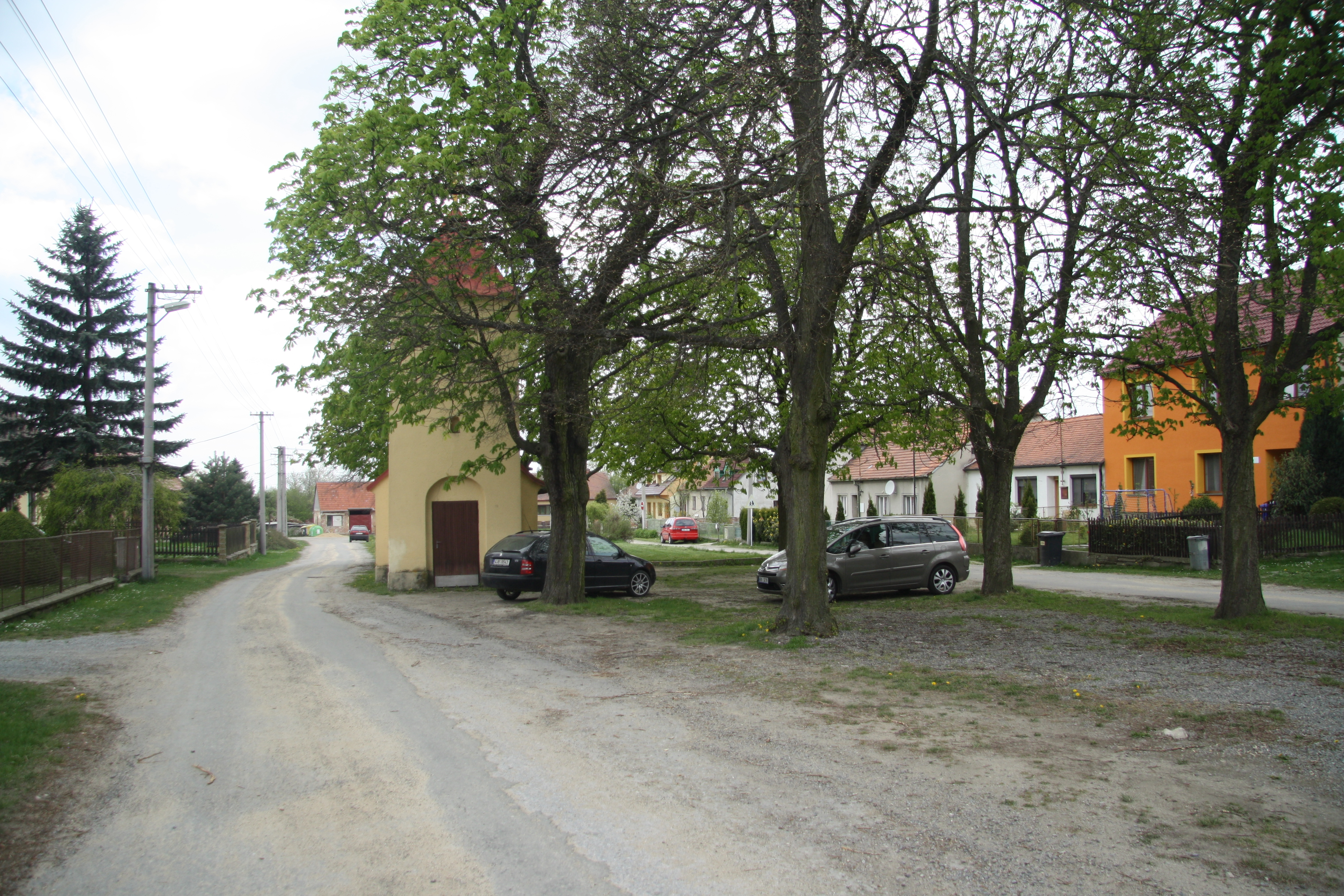
- Centre of Rapotice

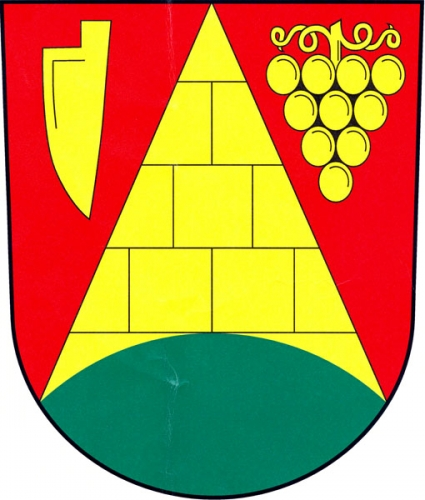
- Flag Coat of arms

- Location in the Czech Republic
- Coordinates: 49°11′32″N 16°15′12″E
- Country: Czech Republic
- Region: Vysočina
- District: Třebíč
- First mentioned: 1101

Area
  - Total: 4.14 km^{2} (1.60 sq mi)
- Elevation: 495 m (1,624 ft)

Population (2026-01-01)
  - Total: 531
  - Density: 128/km^{2} (332/sq mi)
- Time zone: UTC+1 (CET)
  - Summer (DST): UTC+2 (CEST)
- Postal code: 675 73
- Website: www.rapotice.cz

Rapotice is a municipality and village in Třebíč District in the Vysočina Region of the Czech Republic. It has about 500 inhabitants.

Rapotice lies approximately 28 kilometres (17 mi) east of Třebíč, 54 km (34 mi) south-east of Jihlava, and 166 km (103 mi) south-east of Prague.

== Demographics ==
Historical population
Year	Pop.	±%
1869	287	—
1880	353	+23.0%
1890	375	+6.2%
1900	433	+15.5%
1910	468	+8.1%
1921	515	+10.0%
1930	594	+15.3%
1950	595	+0.2%
1961	602	+1.2%
1970	556	−7.6%
1980	503	−9.5%
1991	455	−9.5%
2001	453	−0.4%
2011	505	+11.5%
2021	517	+2.4%
Source: Censuses
