= Žižice =

- Municipality
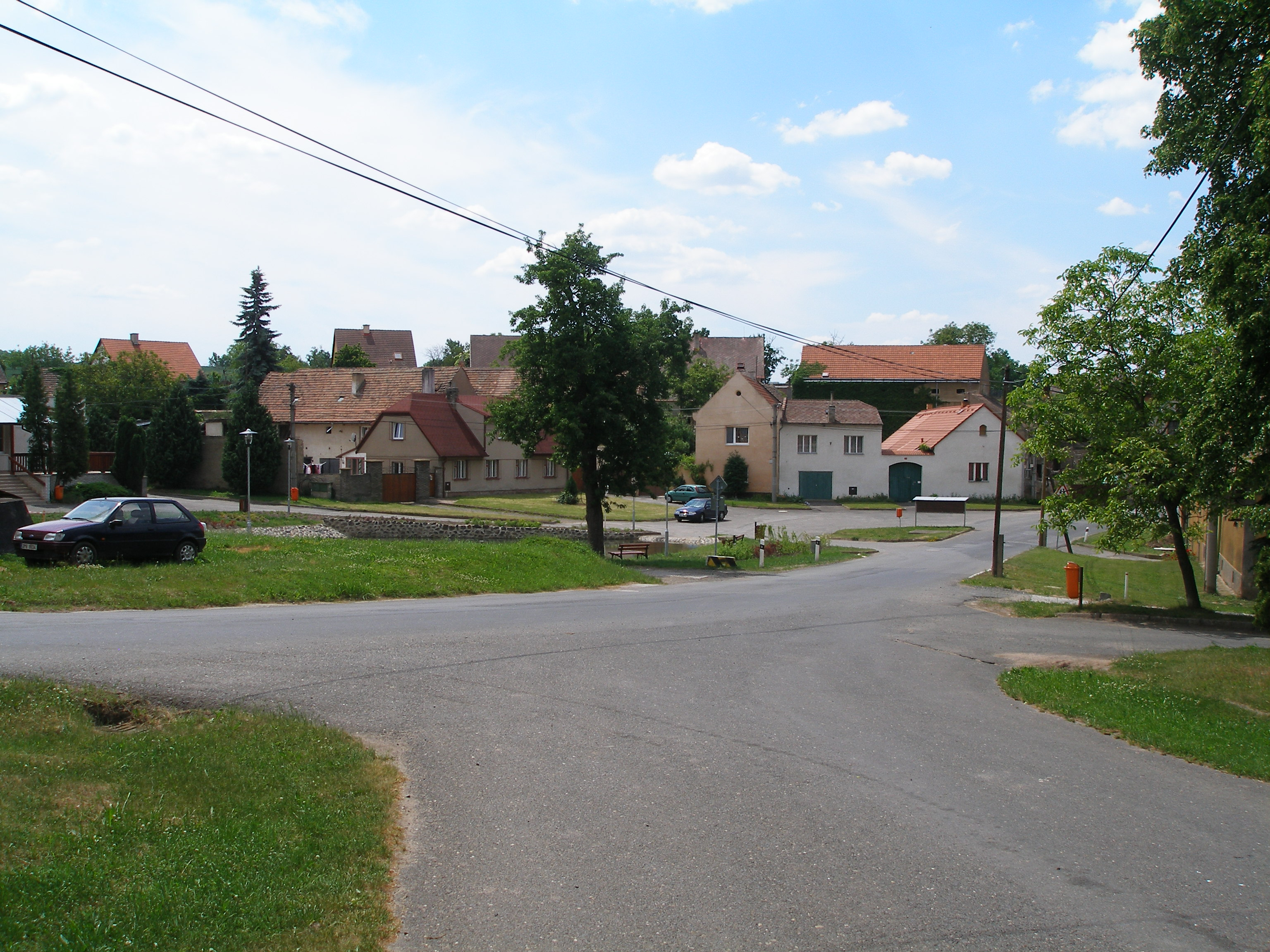
- Common in Žižice

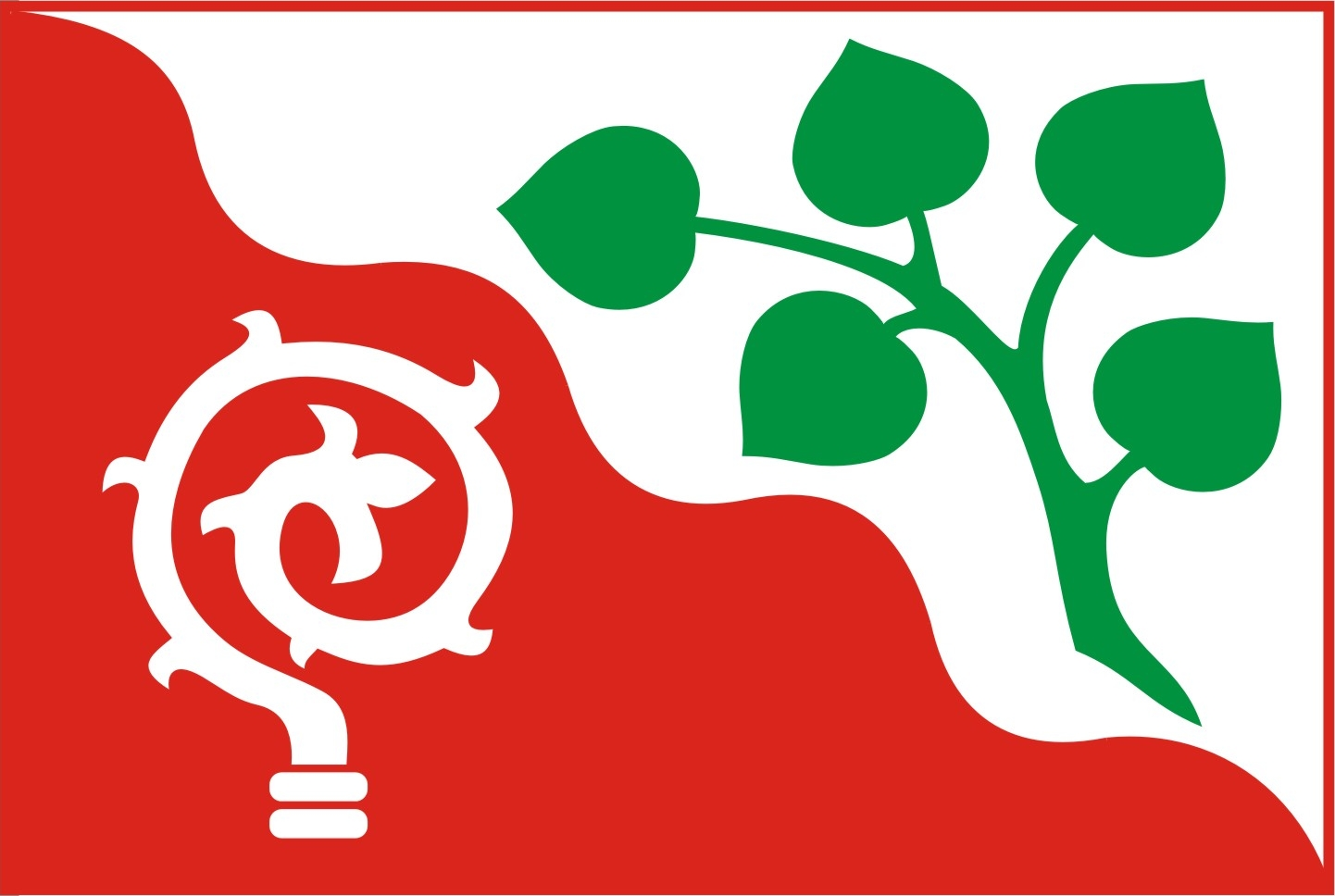
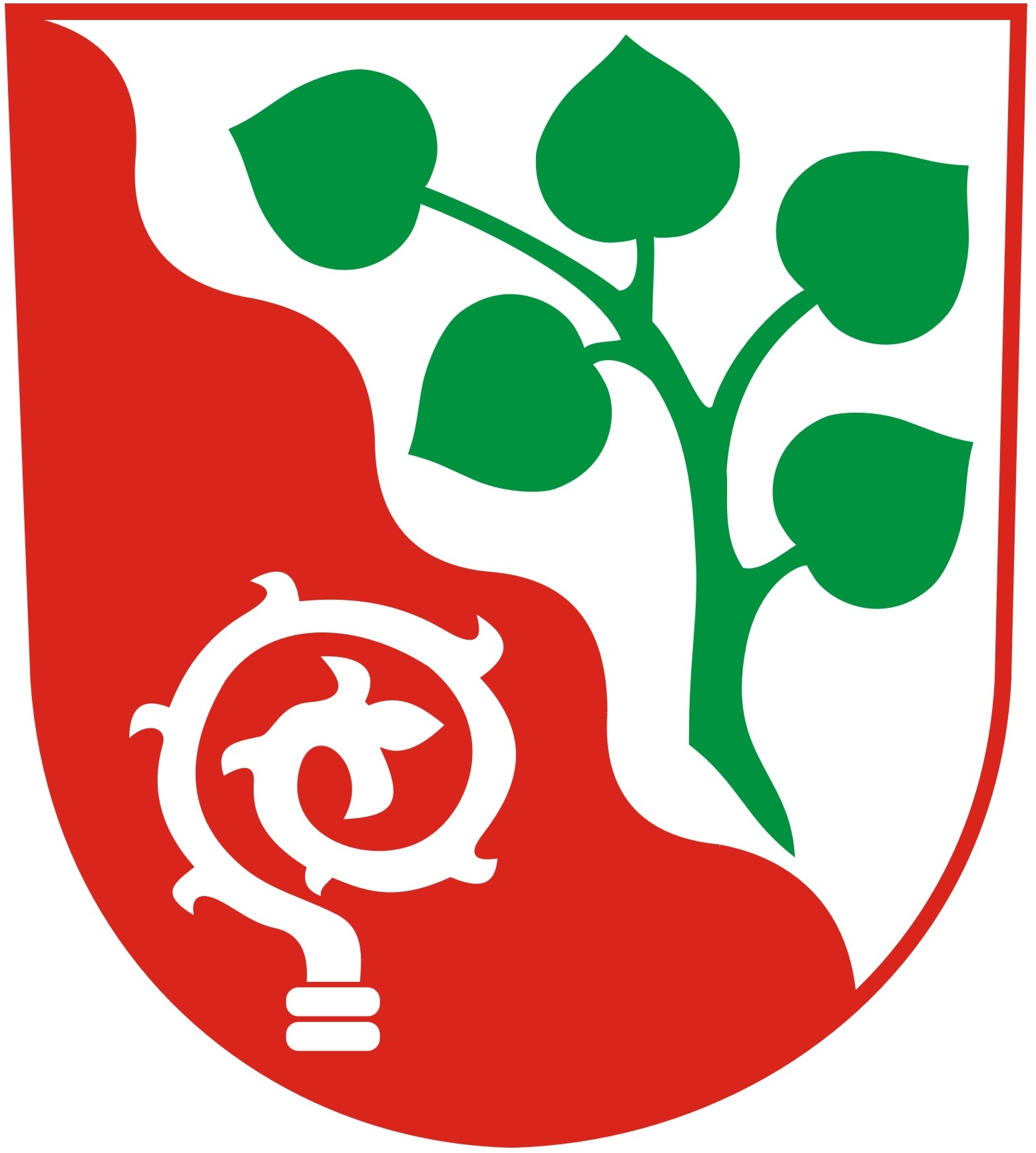
- Flag Coat of arms

- Location in the Czech Republic
- Coordinates: 50°14′47″N 14°9′14″E
- Country: Czech Republic
- Region: Central Bohemian
- District: Kladno
- First mentioned: 1318

Area
  - Total: 12.07 km^{2} (4.66 sq mi)
- Elevation: 234 m (768 ft)

Population (2026-01-01)
  - Total: 780
  - Density: 65/km^{2} (170/sq mi)
- Time zone: UTC+1 (CET)
  - Summer (DST): UTC+2 (CEST)
- Postal codes: 273 21, 273 25, 274 01
- Website: www.zizice.cz

Žižice is a municipality and village in Kladno District in the Central Bohemian Region of the Czech Republic. It has about 800 inhabitants.

== Administrative division ==
Žižice consists of five municipal parts (in brackets population according to the 2021 census):

- Žižice (351)
- Drnov (133)
- Luníkov (71)
- Osluchov (86)
- Vítov (80)

== Demographics ==
Historical population
Year	Pop.	±%
1869	773	—
1880	884	+14.4%
1890	905	+2.4%
1900	1,008	+11.4%
1910	1,039	+3.1%
1921	1,004	−3.4%
1930	931	−7.3%
1950	699	−24.9%
1961	669	−4.3%
1970	570	−14.8%
1980	476	−16.5%
1991	505	+6.1%
2001	513	+1.6%
2011	597	+16.4%
2021	721	+20.8%
Source: Censuses
