= Přehvozdí =

- Municipality
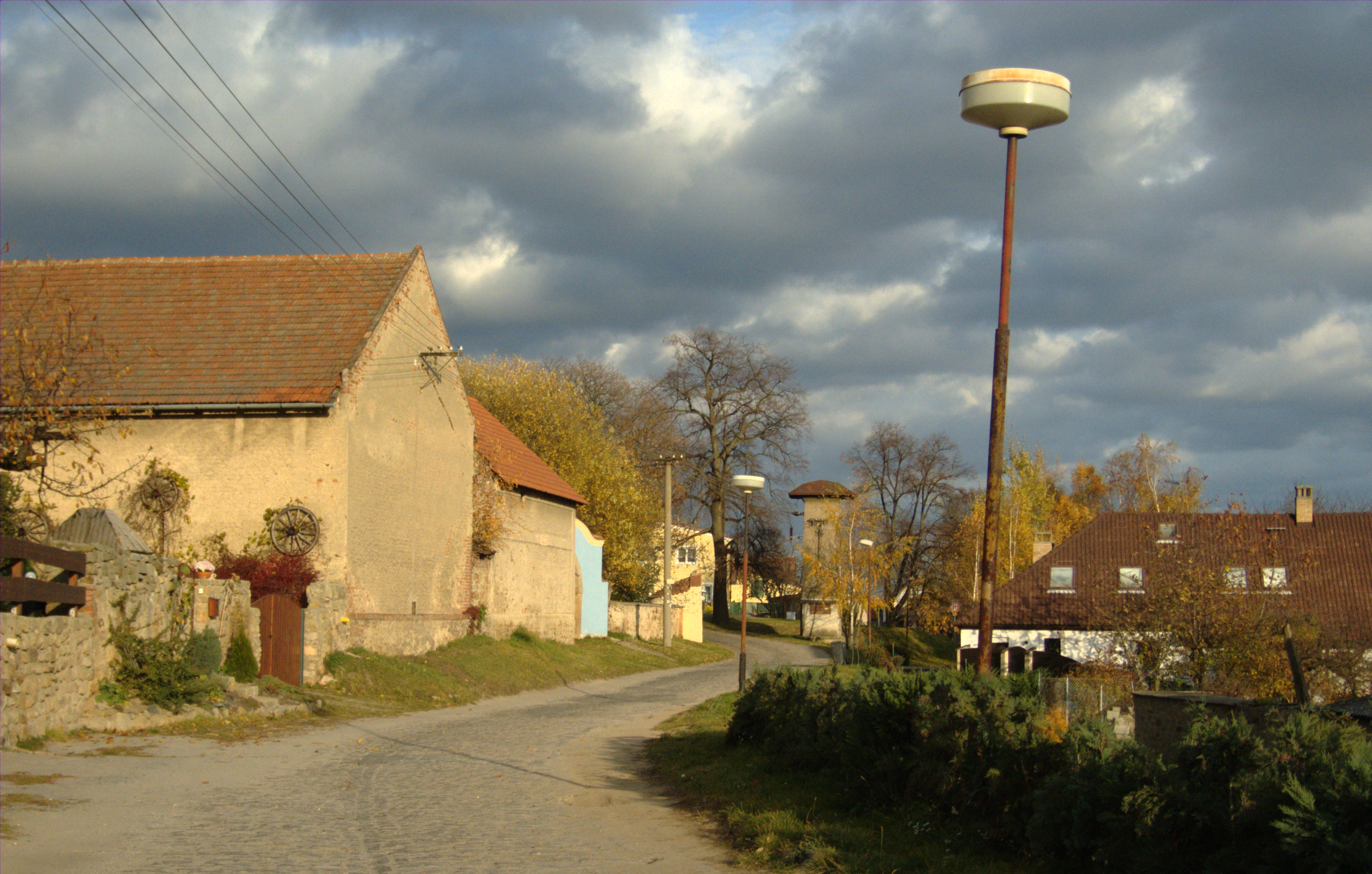
- A road in Přehvozdí

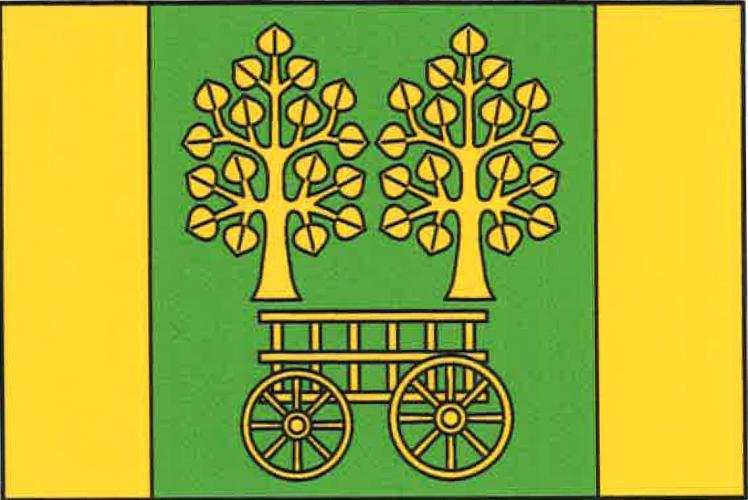
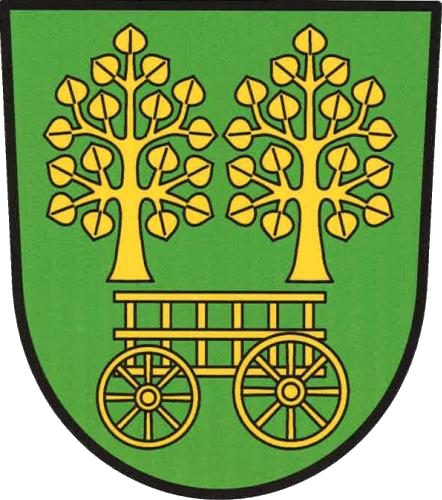
- Flag Coat of arms

- Location in the Czech Republic
- Coordinates: 50°1′39″N 14°50′24″E
- Country: Czech Republic
- Region: Central Bohemian
- District: Kolín
- First mentioned: 1415

Area
  - Total: 2.83 km^{2} (1.09 sq mi)
- Elevation: 305 m (1,001 ft)

Population (2026-01-01)
  - Total: 327
  - Density: 116/km^{2} (299/sq mi)
- Time zone: UTC+1 (CET)
  - Summer (DST): UTC+2 (CEST)
- Postal code: 281 63
- Website: www.prehvozdi.cz

Přehvozdí is a municipality and village in Kolín District in the Central Bohemian Region of the Czech Republic. It has about 300 inhabitants.

== Demographics ==
Historical population
Year	Pop.	±%
1869	275	—
1880	241	−12.4%
1890	273	+13.3%
1900	277	+1.5%
1910	271	−2.2%
1921	234	−13.7%
1930	252	+7.7%
1950	172	−31.7%
1961	160	−7.0%
1970	258	+61.3%
1980	212	−17.8%
1991	159	−25.0%
2001	173	+8.8%
2011	250	+44.5%
2021	310	+24.0%
Source: Censuses
