= Rohozec (Brno-Country District) =

- Municipality
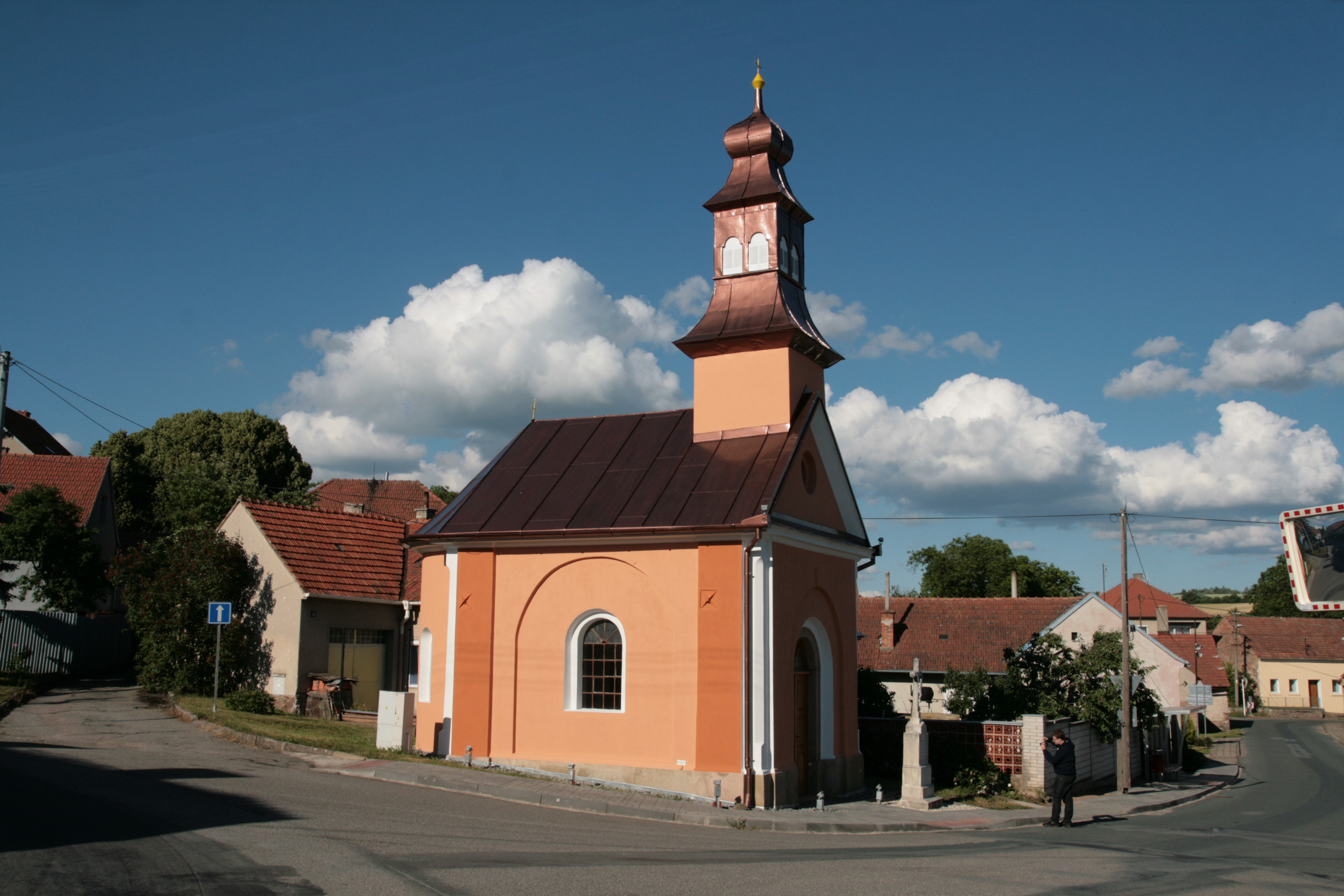
- Chapel of Saints Cyril and Methodius

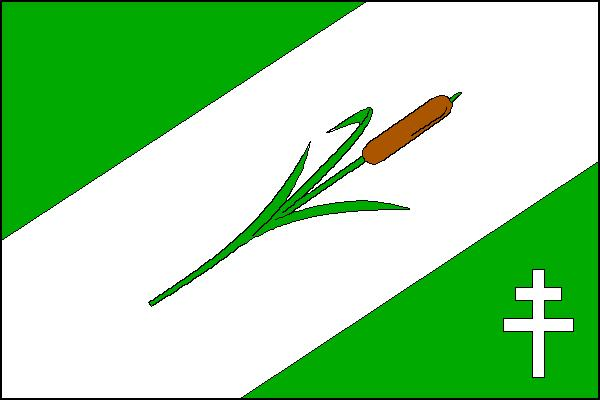
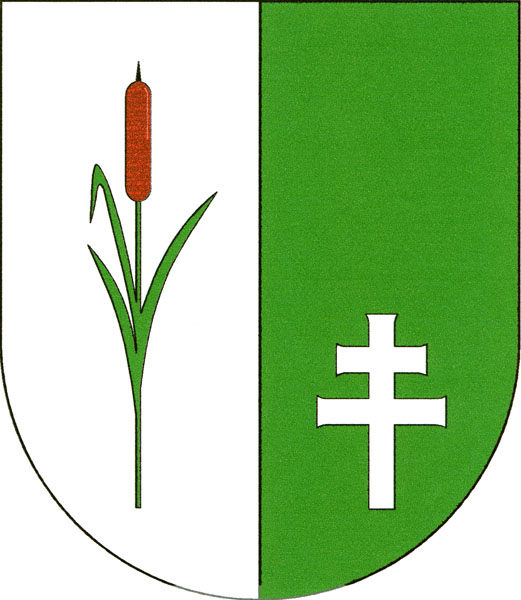
- Flag Coat of arms

- Location in the Czech Republic
- Coordinates: 49°23′25″N 16°28′58″E
- Country: Czech Republic
- Region: South Moravian
- District: Brno-Country
- First mentioned: 1240

Area
  - Total: 5.29 km^{2} (2.04 sq mi)
- Elevation: 425 m (1,394 ft)

Population (2026-01-01)
  - Total: 237
  - Density: 44.8/km^{2} (116/sq mi)
- Time zone: UTC+1 (CET)
  - Summer (DST): UTC+2 (CEST)
- Postal code: 679 23
- Website: www.rohozec.cz

Rohozec is a municipality and village in Brno-Country District in the South Moravian Region of the Czech Republic. It has about 200 inhabitants.

Rohozec lies approximately 24 kilometres (15 mi) north-west of Brno and 168 km (104 mi) south-east of Prague.

== Demographics ==
Historical population
Year	Pop.	±%
1869	226	—
1880	255	+12.8%
1890	268	+5.1%
1900	249	−7.1%
1910	275	+10.4%
1921	285	+3.6%
1930	272	−4.6%
1950	277	+1.8%
1961	266	−4.0%
1970	254	−4.5%
1980	263	+3.5%
1991	233	−11.4%
2001	217	−6.9%
2011	222	+2.3%
2021	223	+0.5%
Source: Censuses
