= Outline of the Czechoslovak People's Army at the end of the Cold War =

The following is a hierarchical outline of the Czechoslovak People's Army at the end of the Cold War. It is intended to convey the connections and relationships between units and formations. At the end of the Cold War in 1989 the Czechoslovak People's Army structure was as follows.

The details are based on the Czech Ministerstvo narodni obrany website, which lists all units of the Czechoslovak People's Army in existence between 1950 and 1990, with their location, subordination, equipment and changes over time.

== Ministry of National Defence ==
- Ministry of National Defence in Prague
  - Main Missile Troops and Artillery Directorate
    - Central Ammunition Depot in Týniště nad Orlicí
    - 6th Armament Base in Olomouc
      - Ammunition Depot Hronsek
      - Ammunition Depot Sklené
      - Ammunition Depot Trenčín
      - Ammunition Depot Poprad
    - Military Repair Plant Moldava nad Bodvou
      - Separate Ammunition Depot Moldava nad Bodvou
    - Military Repair Plant Nováky
      - Separate Ammunition Depot Nováky
  - Main Political Department
    - Political Military Academy in Bratislava
  - Main Medical Department
  - Main Military Transport Directorate
    - 150th Military Traffic Office in Čierna nad Tisou
  - Main Construction and Accommodation Directorate
    - 1st Road Construction Brigade in Pardubice
      - 103rd Road Construction Battalion in Klecany
      - 104th Road Construction Battalion in Nepomuk
      - 107th Road Construction Battalion in Chrudim
      - 108th Road Construction Battalion in Prague
      - 109th Road Construction Battalion in Stará Boleslav
      - 112th Road Construction Battalion in České Budějovice
      - 113th Road Construction Battalion in Týn nad Vltavou
      - 115th Road Construction Battalion in Týn nad Vltavou
      - 116th Road Construction Battalion in Horažďovice
    - 2nd Road Construction Brigade in Bratislava
      - 101st Road Construction Battalion in Vyškov
      - 102nd Road Construction Battalion in Liptovský Mikuláš
      - 105th Road Construction Battalion in Bratislava
      - 106th Road Construction Battalion in Levice
      - 110th Road Construction Battalion in Zbraslav
      - 114th Road Construction Battalion in Levice
  - Equipment Department
  - Quartermaster Department
  - Combat Training Department
  - Educational Department
    - Military Ground Forces University in Vyškov
    - Military Air Forces University "Slovak National Uprising" in Košice
      - 1st Air School Regiment in Přerov with MiG-21F-13 fighters
        - 1st Flight School Squadron
        - 2nd Flight School Squadron
        - 3rd Flight School Squadron
        - 4th Flight School Squadron
        - 28th Air Base Battalion
        - 11th Electronic Support Battalion
      - 2nd Air School Regiment in Košice with Aero L-29 Delfín and L-39 Albatros jet trainers
        - 1st Flight School Squadron
        - 2nd Flight School Squadron
        - 3rd Flight School Squadron
        - 4th Flight School Squadron
        - 20th Air Base Battalion
        - 4th Electronic Support Battalion
      - 3rd Air School Regiment in Piešťany with Mi-2 helicopters
        - 1st Flight School Squadron
        - 2nd Flight School Squadron
        - 3rd Air Base and Electronic Support Battalion
      - Foreign Air Forces Training Center in Košice
      - 10th Military Air Forces Maintenance Center in Prešov
    - Military Technical University in Liptovský Mikuláš
  - Engineer Troops Department
    - Repair Base 042 in Olomouc
  - Fuel Distribution Department
  - Chemical Troops Department
    - NBC-detection Center in Hostivice
  - Professional Sport Army Center DUKLA in Banská Bystrica
  - Veterinary Service Section
    - Military Veterinary Research and Training Institute in Košice
  - Automobile Repair Plant Zlatovce in Trenčín
  - Central Tank and Automobile Depot in Nitra

=== General Staff of the Czechoslovak People's Army ===
- General Staff of the Czechoslovak People's Army in Prague
  - Main Intelligence Directorate
    - 78th Special Purpose Radio Center in Litoměřice
    - 22nd Special Purpose Airborne Brigade in Prostějov
      - Headquarters and Staff Company
      - 1st Special Reconnaissance Division
      - 2nd Special Reconnaissance Division
      - 3rd Special Reconnaissance Division
      - Support Weapons Company
      - Special Signal Center
      - Training Center
  - Main Operations Directorate
    - 101st Headquarters Battalion in Prague
    - 102nd Headquarters Battalion in Prague
  - Main Signal Troops Directorate
    - Signal Operating Center
      - Signal Node of the General Staff
  - Topographical Department
    - Military Topographic Institute in Dobruška
    - Military Cartographic Institute in Harmanec
    - Military Geographic Institute in Prague
    - 5th Geodetic Detachment in Opava
    - Central Topographic Maps Depot in Prague
    - Research Center 090 in Prague

=== Western Military District ===
Western Military District main units and Soviet formations (in red) in 1989

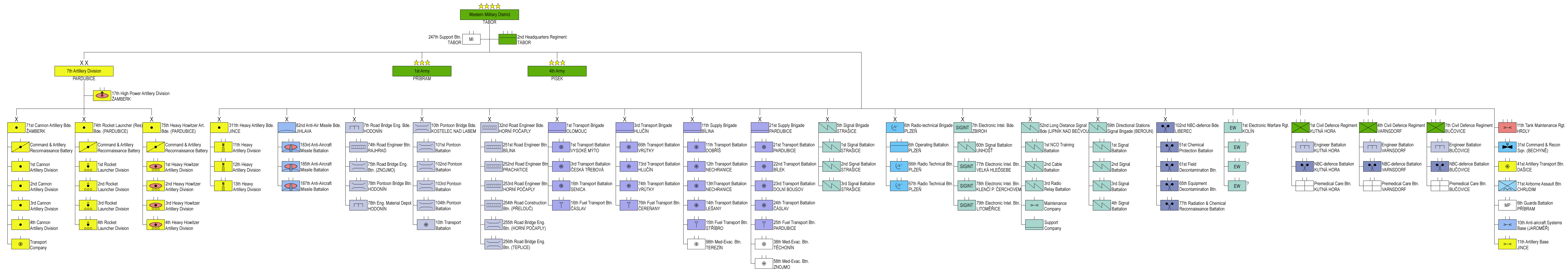
Western Military District Operational Structure in 1989 (click to enlarge)

- Western Military District in Tábor
  - 2nd operational regiment ( Tábor )
  - 311th Heavy Artillery Brigade ( Jince )
  - 11th Artillery Base (Jince)
  - 41st separate transport artillery detachment ( Dašice )
  - 7th Artillery Division ( Pardubice ) 8228
  - 71st Cannon Artillery Brigade ( Žamberk ) 3607
  - 75th Heavy Howitzer Artillery Brigade ( Pardubice ) 5666
  - 82nd Anti-Aircraft Missile Brigade ( Jihlava )
  - 10th anti-aircraft repair technical base ( Jaroměř )
  - 6th radio engineering brigade ( Pilsen )
  - 71st Airborne Strike Battalion ( Chrudim )
  - 22nd Special Airborne Brigade ( Prostějov )
  - 7th special purpose radio engineering brigade ( Zbiroh )
  - 1st mixed radio electronic warfare regiment ( Kolín )
  - 10th pontoon brigade ( Kostelec nad Labem )
  - 5th Liaison Brigade ( Strašice )
  - 52nd long-distance link brigade ( Lipník nad Bečvou )
  - 59th long-distance link brigade ( Beroun )
  - 60th special purpose liaison battalion ( Unhošť )
  - 102nd Chemical Protection Brigade ( Liberec )
  - 31st mixed command and reconnaissance squadron ( Bechyně )
  - 31st company of airport and radio technical security ( Bechyně )
  - 311th Independent Training Tank Battalion ( Hradiště Military District )
  - 313th Independent Training Tank Battalion ( Boletice Military District )
  - 1st Automobile Brigade ( Olomouc )
  - 3rd Automobile Brigade ( Hlúčín )
  - 11th material security brigade ( Bílina )
  - 21st Material Security Brigade ( Pardubice )
  - 1st Fuel Pipeline Transport Brigade ( Roudnice nad Labem )
  - 7th engineer road brigade ( Hodonín )
  - 32nd Road Brigade ( Horní Počáply )
  - 1st Civil Defense Regiment ( Kutná Hora )
  - 4th Civil Defense Regiment ( Varnsdorf )
  - 7th Civil Defense Regiment ( Bučovice )
  - 6th Guards Battalion ( Příbram )

Equipment, warehouses

  - 1st circuit tank warehouse ( Ústí nad Orlicí ) branch ( Zdice, Vamberk )
  - 1st circuit warehouse of provision material ( Rychnovek ) of the branch (Terezín, České Budějovice )
  - 1st circuit engineering warehouse ( Dolní Bousov ) branches ( Jánská, Jaroměř, Dobříš, Hněvkovice)
  - 1st circuit connecting warehouse and repair shop ( Červený Pečky ) branch ( Červený Újezd )
  - 1st circuit chemical warehouse ( Račice nad Trotinou ) branches ( Rumburk, Olomouc, Zásmuky )
  - 1st circuit automobile warehouse ( Nový Jičín ) branches ( Poprad, Nemecká, Vysoké Mýto, Kutná Hora, Ostrava )
  - 1st regional warehouse of political and educational resources (České Budějovice) branch ( Brno, Čáslav )
  - 1st circuit warehouse of equipment material Jaroměř branch ( Brno, Staré Město )
  - 1st circuit fuel base ( Chlumec nad Cidlinou ) branches ( Halenkov, Mošnov )
  - 1st district medical warehouse ( Liberec ) branches (Dobrá, Golčův Jeníkov, Vlčí Hora )
  - 1st district warehouse for accommodation and building materials ( Hradec Králové )
  - 2nd armament base ( Jaroměř ) branch ( Terezín )
  - 21. road bridge technical base Chrudim

==== 1st Army ====
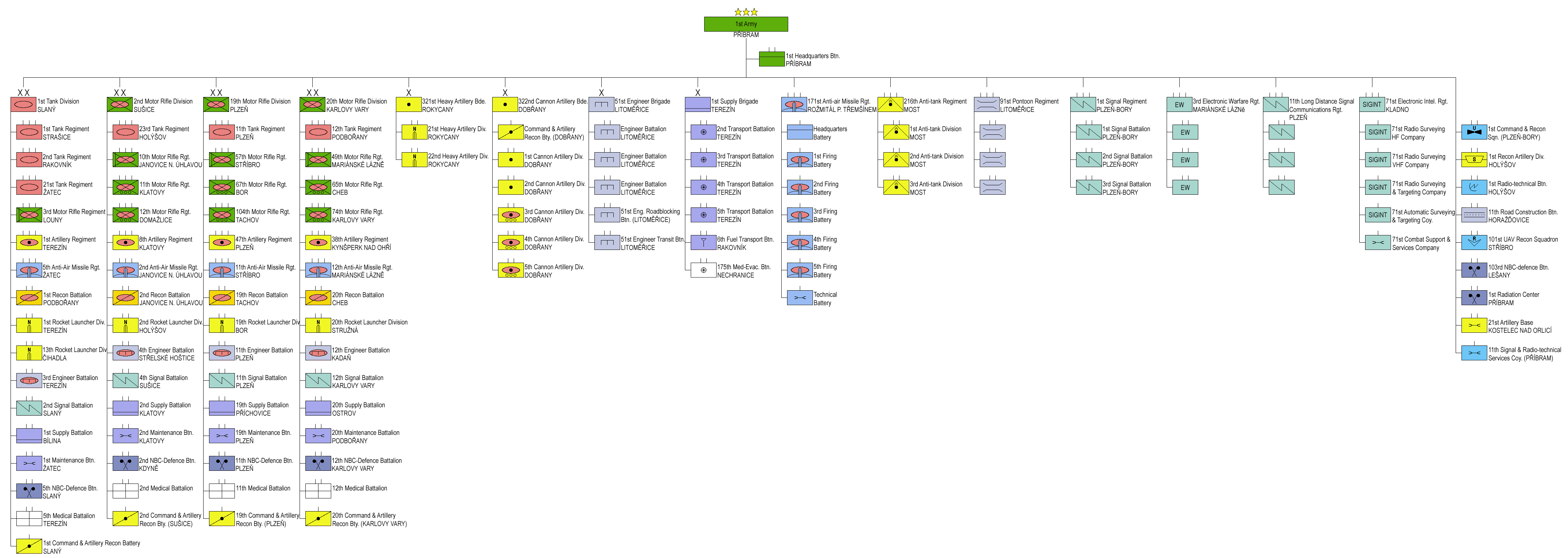
1st Army Structure in 1989 (click to enlarge)

- 1st Army in Příbram:
  - 1st Headquarters Battalion in Příbram
  - 1st Tank Division in Slaný (in case of full mobilization would have also formed the 16th Tank Division)
    - 1st Tank Regiment in Strašice
    - 2nd Tank Regiment in Rakovník
    - 21st Tank Regiment in Žatec
    - 3rd Motor Rifle Regiment in Louny with BVP-2 tracked infantry fighting vehicles
    - 1st Artillery Regiment in Terezín
    - 1st Separate Missile Battalion in Terezín with OTR-21 Tochka tactical ballistic missiles
    - 13th Separate Missile battalion in Čihadla with 9K52 Luna-M artillery rocket systems
    - 1st Command and Artillery Reconnaissance Battery in Slaný
    - 5th Anti-Aircraft Missile Regiment in Žatec with 9K33 Osa surface-to-air missile systems
    - 1st Reconnaissance Battalion in Podbořany
    - 3rd Engineer Battalion in Terezín
    - 2nd Signal Battalion in Slaný
    - 1st Supply Battalion in Bílina
    - 1st Maintenance Battalion in Žatec
    - 5th Chemical Defence Battalion in Slaný
    - 5th Medical Battalion in Terezín
  - 2nd Motor Rifle Division in Sušice
    - 23rd Tank Regiment in Holýšov
    - 10th Motor Rifle Regiment in Janovice nad Úhlavou with BVP-1 tracked infantry fighting vehicles
    - 11th Motor Rifle Regiment in Klatovy with OT-64 wheeled armored transports vehicles
    - 12th Motor Rifle Regiment in Domažlice with OT-64 wheeled armored transports vehicles
    - 8th Artillery Regiment in Klatovy
    - 2nd Separate Missile Battalion in Holýšov with 9K52 Luna-M artillery rocket systems
    - 2nd Command and Artillery Reconnaissance Battery in Sušice
    - 2nd Anti-Aircraft Missile Regiment in Janovice nad Úhlavou with 2K12 Kub surface-to-air missile systems
    - 2nd Reconnaissance Battalion in Janovice nad Úhlavou
    - 4th Engineer Battalion in Střelské Hoštice
    - 4th Signal Battalion in Sušice
    - 2nd Supply Battalion Klatovy
    - 2nd Maintenance Battalion in Klatovy
    - 2nd Chemical Defence Battalion in Kdyně
    - 2nd Medical Battalion
  - 19th Motor Rifle Division in Plzeň
    - 11th Tank Regiment in Plzeň
    - 57th Motor Rifle Regiment in Stříbro with BVP-1 tracked infantry fighting vehicles
    - 67th Motor Rifle Regiment in Bor with BVP-2 tracked infantry fighting vehicles
    - 104th Motor Rifle Regiment in Tachov with OT-64 wheeled armored transports vehicles
    - 47th Artillery Regiment in Plzeň
    - 19th Separate Missile Battalion in Bor with 9K52 Luna-M artillery rocket systems
    - 19th Command and Artillery Reconnaissance Battery in Plzeň
    - 11th Anti-Aircraft Missile Regiment in Stříbro with 2K12 Kub surface-to-air missile systems
    - 19th Reconnaissance Battalion in Tachov
    - 11th Engineer Battalion in Plzeň
    - 11th Signal Battalion in Plzeň
    - 19th Supply Battalion in Příchovice
    - 19th Maintenance Battalion in Plzeň
    - 11th Chemical Defence Battalion in Plzeň
    - 11th Medical Battalion
  - 20th Motor Rifle Division in Karlovy Vary
    - 12th Tank Regiment in Podbořany
    - 49th Motor Rifle Regiment in Mariánské Lázně with BVP-1 tracked infantry fighting vehicles
    - 65th Motor Rifle Regiment in Cheb with OT-64 wheeled armored transports vehicles
    - 74th Motor Rifle Regiment in Karlovy Vary with OT-64 wheeled armored transports vehicles
    - 38th Artillery Regiment in Kynšperk nad Ohří
    - 20th Separate Missile battalion in Stružná with 9K52 Luna-M artillery rocket systems
    - 20th Command and Artillery Reconnaissance Battery in Karlovy Vary
    - 12th Anti-Aircraft Missile Regiment in Mariánské Lázně with 2K12 Kub surface-to-air missile systems
    - 20th Reconnaissance Battalion in Cheb
    - 12th Engineer Battalion in Kadaň
    - 12th Signal Battalion in Karlovy Vary
    - 20th Supply Battalion in Ostrov
    - 20th Maintenance Battalion in Podbořany
    - 12th Chemical Defence Battalion in Karlovy Vary
    - 12th Medical Battalion
  - 1st operational battalion ( Příbram )
  - 321st Heavy Artillery Brigade ( Rokycany )
  - 31st Artillery Base ( Kostelec nad Orlicí )
  - 322nd Cannon Artillery Brigade ( Dobřany )
  - 216th Anti-Tank Regiment ( Most )
  - 1st Reconnaissance Artillery Regiment ( Holyšov )
  - 171st Anti-Aircraft Missile Regiment ( Rožmitál pod Třemšínem )
  - 1st anti-aircraft repair technical base (Rožmitál pod Třemšínem)
  - 1st radio engineering battalion ( Holyšov )
  - 51st Engineer Brigade ( Litoměřice )
  - 91st Pontoon Regiment ( Litoměřice )
  - 1st Liaison Regiment ( Plzeň )
  - 11th long-distance connection regiment ( Plzeň )
  - 71st special purpose radio engineering regiment ( Kladno )
  - 3rd mixed radio electronic warfare regiment ( Marianske Lazne )
  - 103rd Chemical Protection Battalion ( Lešany )
  - 11th Helicopter Regiment ( Plzeň-Bory ) (part of the 10th Air Army until 31. October 1989, then transferred to the 1st Army Aviation Department)
  - 111th Airfield Battalion ( Plzeň-Bory )
  - 11th liaison and radio technical security company ( Plzeň-Bory )
  - 1st Command and Reconnaissance Squadron ( Plzeň-Bory )
  - 1st company of airport and radio technical security ( Plzeň-Bory )
  - 101st Unmanned Reconnaissance Squadron ( Silver )
  - 1st Material Security Brigade ( Terezín )
  - 11. road battalion ( Jince-Velcí )

==== 4th Army ====
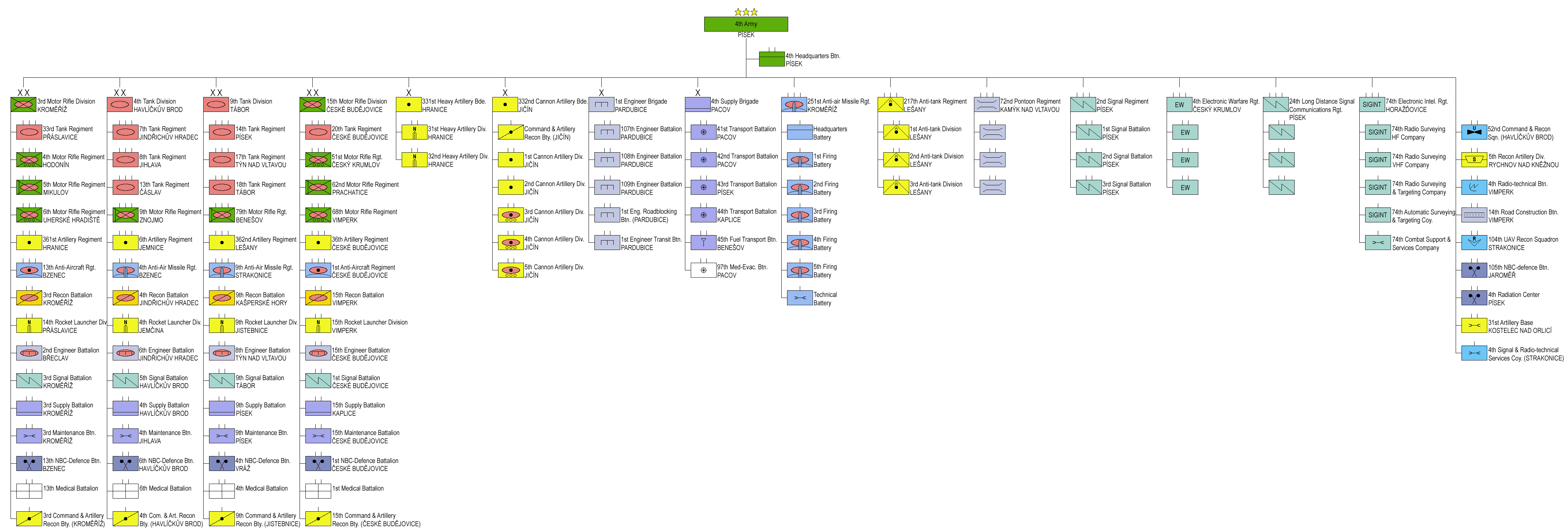
4th Army Structure in 1989 (click to enlarge)

- 4th Army in Písek:
  - 4th Headquarters Battalion in Písek
  - 3rd Motor Rifle Division in Kroměříž (in case of full mobilization would have also formed the 26th Motor Rifle Division)
    - 33rd Tank Regiment in Přáslavice
    - 4th Motor Rifle Regiment in Hodonín with OT-64 wheeled armored transports vehicles
    - 5th Motor Rifle Regiment in Mikulov with BVP-1 tracked infantry fighting vehicles
    - 6th Motor Rifle Regiment in Uherské Hradiště with OT-64 wheeled armored transports vehicles
    - 361st Artillery Regiment in Hranice
    - 14th Independent Missile Battalion in Přáslavice with 9K52 Luna-M artillery rocket systems
    - 3rd Command and Artillery Reconnaissance Battery in Kroměříž
    - 13th Anti-Aircraft Regiment in Bzenec
    - 3rd Reconnaissance Battalion in Kroměříž
    - 2nd Engineer Battalion in Břeclav
    - 3rd Signal Battalion in Kroměříž
    - 3rd Supply Battalion in Kroměříž
    - 3rd Maintenance Battalion in Kroměříž
    - 13th Chemical Defence Battalion in Bzenec
    - 13th Medical Battalion
  - 4th Tank Division in Havlíčkův Brod
    - 7th Tank Regiment in Jindřichův Hradec
    - 8th Tank Regiment in Jihlava
    - 13th Tank Regiment in Čáslav
    - 9th Motor Rifle Regiment in Znojmo with BVP-1 tracked infantry fighting vehicles
    - 6th Artillery Regiment in Jemnice
    - 4th Independent Missile Battalion in Jemčina with 9K52 Luna-M artillery rocket systems
    - 4th Command and Artillery Reconnaissance Battery in Havlíčkův Brod
    - 4th Anti-Aircraft Missile Regiment in Bzenec with 2K12 Kub surface-to-air missile systems
    - 4th Reconnaissance Battalion in Jindřichův Hradec
    - 6th Engineer Battalion in Jindřichův Hradec
    - 5th Signal Battalion in Havlíčkův Brod
    - 4th Supply Battalion in Havlíčkův Brod
    - 4th Maintenance Battalion in Jihlava
    - 6th Chemical Defence Battalion in Havlíčkův Brod
    - 6th Medical Battalion
  - 9th Tank Division in Tábor
    - 14th Tank Regiment in Písek
    - 17th Tank Regiment in Týn nad Vltavou
    - 18th Tank Regiment in Tábor
    - 79th Motor Rifle Regiment in Benešov with BVP-2 tracked infantry fighting vehicles
    - 362nd Artillery Regiment in Lešany
    - 9th Independent Missile Battalion in Jistebnice with OTR-21 Tochka tactical ballistic missiles
    - 9th Command and Artillery Reconnaissance Battery in Jistebnice
    - 9th Anti-Aircraft Missile Regiment in Strakonice with 2K12 Kub surface-to-air missile systems
    - 9th Reconnaissance Battalion in Kašperské Hory
    - 8th Engineer Battalion in Týn nad Vltavou
    - 9th Signal Battalion in Tábor
    - 9th Supply Battalion in Písek
    - 9th Maintenance Battalion in Písek
    - 4th Chemical Defence Battalion in Vráž
    - 4th Medical Battalion
  - 15th Motor Rifle Division in České Budějovice (in case of full mobilization would have also formed the 18th Motor Rifle Division)
    - 20th Tank Regiment in České Budějovice
    - 51st Motor Rifle Regiment in Český Krumlov with OT-64 wheeled armored transports vehicles
    - 62nd Motor Rifle Regiment in Prachatice with BVP-1 tracked infantry fighting vehicles
    - 68th Motor Rifle Regiment in Vimperk with OT-64 wheeled armored transports vehicles
    - 36th Artillery Regiment in České Budějovice
    - 15th Separate Rocket Launcher Division in Vimperk with 9K52 Luna-M artillery rocket systems
    - 15th Command and Artillery Reconnaissance Battery in České Budějovice
    - 1st Anti-Aircraft Regiment in České Budějovice
    - 15th Reconnaissance Battalion in Vimperk
    - 15th Engineer Battalion in České Budějovice
    - 1st Signal Battalion in České Budějovice
    - 15th Supply Battalion in Kaplice
    - 15th Maintenance Battalion in České Budějovice
    - 1st Chemical Defence Battalion in České Budějovice
    - 1st Medical Battalion
  - 4th operational battalion ( Písek )
  - 331st Heavy Artillery Brigade ( Border )
  - 21st Artillery Base ( Kostelec nad Orlicí )
  - 332nd Cannon Artillery Brigade ( Jicín )
  - 217th Anti-Tank Regiment ( Lešany )
  - 5th Reconnaissance Artillery Section ( Rychnov nad Kněžnou )
  - 251st Anti-Aircraft Missile Regiment ( Kroměříž )
  - 4th Radiotechnical Battalion ( Vimperk )
  - 1st Engineer Brigade ( Pardubice )
  - 72nd pontoon regiment ( Kamýk nad Vltavou )
  - 2nd liaison regiment (Písek)
  - 24th long-distance connection regiment (Písek)
  - 74th special purpose radio engineering regiment ( Horažďovice )
  - 4th mixed radio electronic warfare regiment ( Český Krumlov )
  - 105th Chemical Protection Battalion ( Jaroměř )
  - 51st Helicopter Regiment ( Prostějov ) (part of the 10th Air Army until 31. October 1989, then transferred to the 4th Army Aviation Department)
  - 51st Airfield Battalion (Prostějov)
  - 61st liaison and radio technical security company (Prostějov)
  - 52nd Command and Reconnaissance Squadron ( Havlíčkův Brod )
  - 52nd Airfield and Radio Technical Security Squadron (Havlíčkův Brod)
  - 104th squadron of unmanned reconnaissance vehicles ( Krašovice )
  - 4th Material Security Brigade ( Pacov )
  - 14th Road Battalion ( Vimperk )

=== Eastern Military District ===
Eastern Military District main units and Soviet formations (in red) in 1989

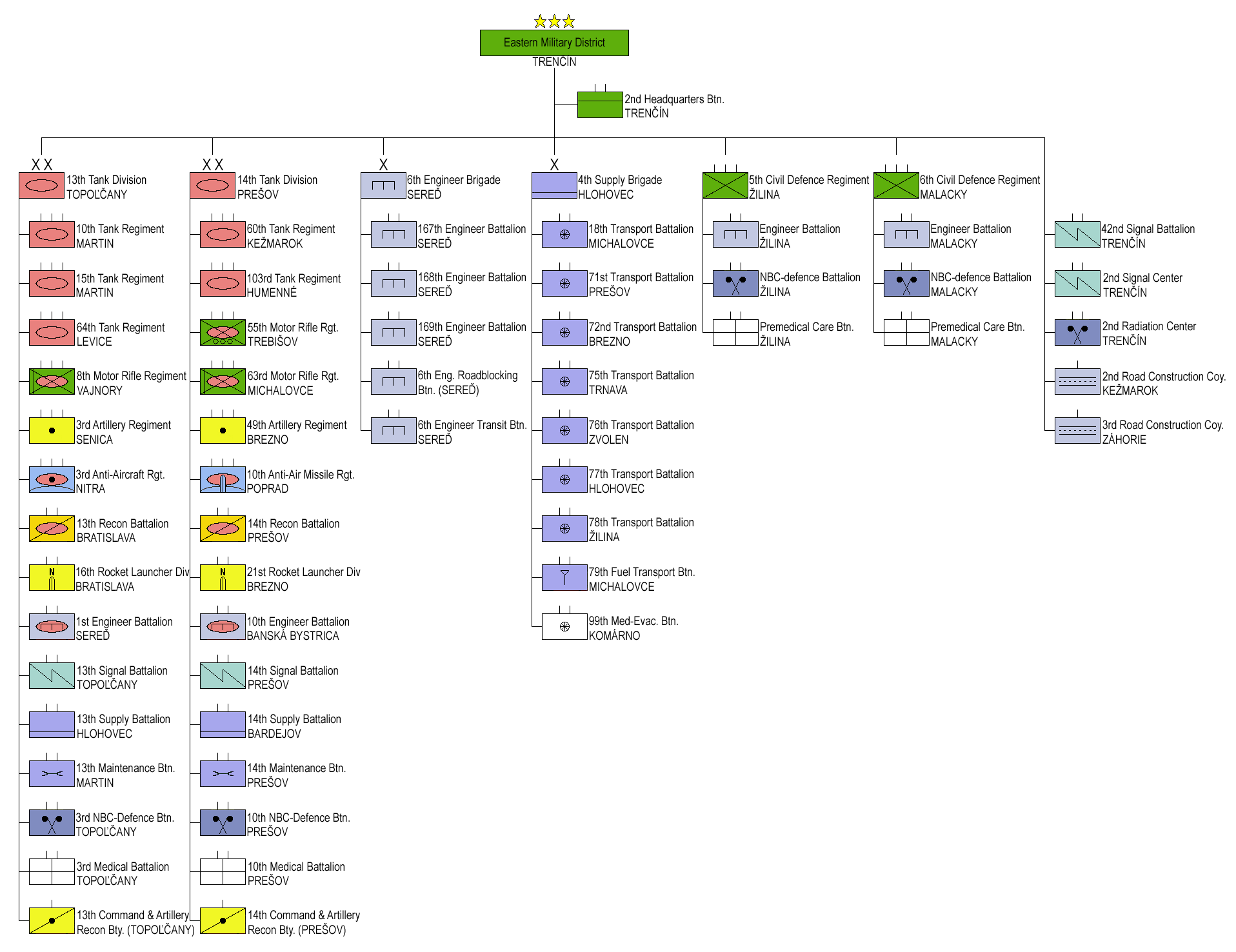
Eastern Military District Operational Structure in 1989 (click to enlarge)

- Eastern Military District in Trenčín corresponding to the Slovak Socialist Republic. In case of war the district would have been supported by the 30th Guards Motor Rifle Division of the Soviet Union's Central Group of Forces
- 2nd operational battalion in Trenčín
- 6th Engineer Brigade in Sereď
- 4th Automobile Brigade in Hlohovec
- 42nd liaison battalion in Trenčín
- 5th Civil Defense Regiment in Žilina
- 6th Civil Defense Regiment in Malacky
- 13th Tank Division in Topoľčany (in case of full mobilization would have also formed the 17th Tank Division)
  - 10th Tank Regiment in Martin
  - 15th Tank Regiment in Martin
  - 64th Tank Regiment in Levice
  - 8th Motor Rifle Regiment in Vajnory with BVP-1 tracked infantry fighting vehicles
  - 3rd Artillery Regiment in Senica
  - 16th Independent Missile Battalion in Bratislava with 9K52 Luna-M artillery rocket systems
  - 13th Command and Artillery Reconnaissance Battery in Topoľčany
  - 3rd Anti-Aircraft Regiment in Nitra
  - 13th Reconnaissance Battalion in Bratislava
  - 1st Engineer Battalion in Sereď
  - 13th Signal Battalion in Topoľčany
  - 13th Supply Battalion in Hlohovec
  - 13th Maintenance Battalion in Martin
  - 3rd Chemical Defence Battalion in Topoľčany
  - 3rd Medical Battalion in Topoľčany
- 14th Tank Division in Prešov (in case of full mobilization would have also formed the 32nd Motor Rifle Division)
  - 60th Tank Regiment in Kežmarok
  - 103rd Tank Regiment in Humenné
  - 55th Motor Rifle Regiment in Trebišov with OT-64 wheeled armored transports vehicles
  - 63rd Motor Rifle Regiment in Michalovce with BVP-1 tracked infantry fighting vehicles
  - 49th Artillery Regiment in Brezno
  - 21st Independent Missile Battalion with 9K52 Luna-M artillery rocket systems
  - 14th Command and Artillery Reconnaissance Battery in Prešov
  - 10th Anti-Aircraft Missile Regiment in Poprad with 2K12 Kub surface-to-air missile systems
  - 14th Reconnaissance Battalion in Prešov
  - 10th Engineer Battalion in Banská Bystrica
  - 14th Signal Battalion in Prešov
  - 14th Supply Battalion in Bardejov
  - 14th Maintenance Battalion in Prešov
  - 10th Chemical Defence Battalion in Prešov
  - 10th Medical Battalion in Prešov

=== Air Forces Command ===
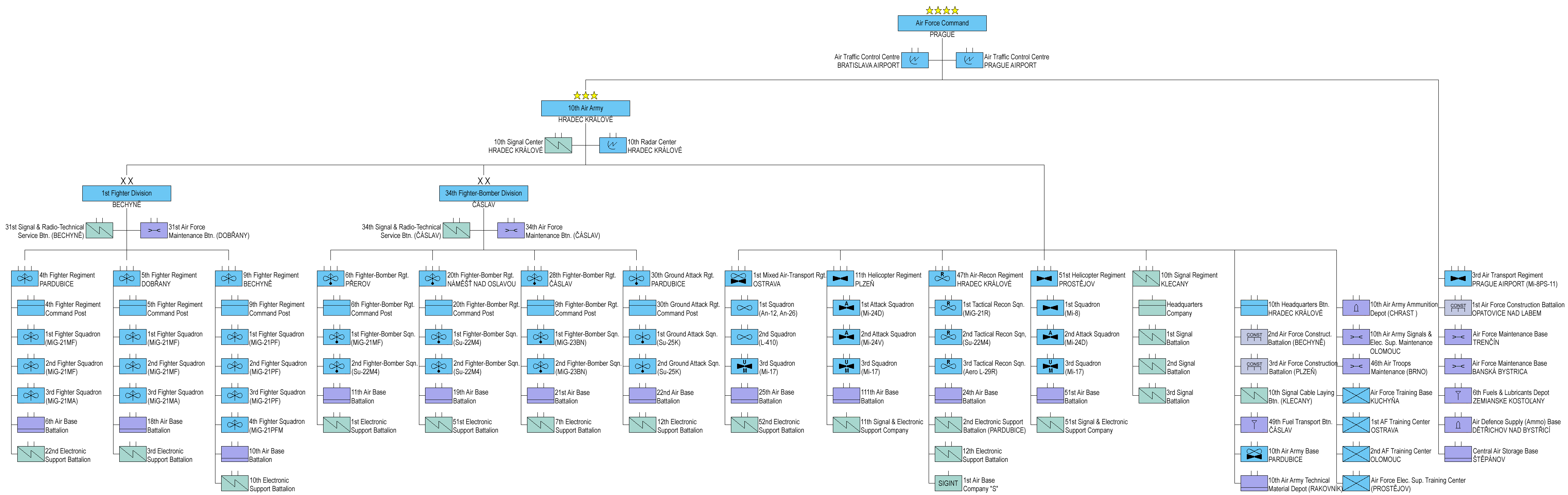
Air Forces Command Structure in 1989 (click to enlarge)

- Air Force Command in Prague
  - 3rd Air Transport Regiment at Prague Airport
    - Mixed Special Purpose Squadron flying Mi-8PS-11 (VIP Transport)
  - Air Traffic Control Center Prague Airport
  - Air Traffic Control Center Bratislava Airport
  - Air Force Logistics in Prague
    - 1st Air Force Construction Battalion in Opatovice nad Labem
    - Air Force Maintenance Base Trenčín
    - Air Force Maintenance Base Banská Bystrica
    - 6th Fuels and Lubricants Depot in Zemianske Kostoľany
    - Air Defence Supply (Ammunition) Base in Dětřichov nad Bystřicí
  - Central Air Storage Base in Štěpánov
    - 1st Central Technical Material Depot in Štěpánov
    - 2nd Central Technical Material Depot in Bruntál
    - 3rd Central Air Force Depot in Zvolen
    - 5th Central Air Force Depot in Maršová-Rašov
    - 6th Central Arms and Ammunition Depot in Konice
    - Airborne Material and Equipment Depot in Čeladná

==== 10th Air Army ====
- 10th Headquarters Battalion in Hradec Králové
  - 1st Mixed Air-Transport Regiment in Ostrava
    - 1st Squadron flying An-12 and An-26 aircraft
    - 2nd Squadron flying L-410 planes
    - 3rd Squadron flying Mi-17 helicopters
    - 25th Air Base Battalion
    - 52nd Electronic Support Battalion
  - 11th Helicopter Regiment in Plzeň
    - 1st Attack Squadron flying Mi-24D helicopters
    - 2nd Attack Squadron flying Mi-24V helicopters
    - 3rd Squadron flying Mi-17 helicopters
    - 111th Air Base Battalion
    - 11th Signal and Electronic Support Company
  - 47th Air-Reconnaissance Regiment in Hradec Králové
    - 1st Tactical Reconnaissance Squadron flying MiG-21R
    - 2nd Tactical Reconnaissance Squadron flying Su-22M4
    - 3rd Tactical Reconnaissance Squadron flying Aero L-29R
    - 24th Air Base Battalion
    - 2nd Electronic Support Battalion in Pardubice
    - 12th Electronic Support Battalion in Hradec Králové
    - 1st Air Base Company "S"
  - 51st Helicopter Regiment in Prostějov
    - 1st Squadron flying Mi-8 helicopters
    - 2nd Squadron flying Mi-24D helicopters
    - 3rd Squadron flying Mi-17 helicopters
    - 51st Air Base Battalion
    - 51st Signal and Electronic Support Company
  - 10th Signal Regiment in Klecany
    - Headquarters Company
    - 1st Signal Battalion
    - 2nd Signal Battalion
    - 3rd Signal Battalion
  - 10th Signal Cable Laying Battalion in Klecany
  - 10th Signal Center in Hradec Králové
  - 10th Radar Center in Hradec Králové
  - 2nd Air Force Construction Battalion in Bechyně
  - 3rd Air Force Construction Battalion in Plzeň
  - 46th Air Troops Maintenance Center in Brno
  - 49th Fuel Transport Battalion in Čáslav
  - 10th Air Army Base in Pardubice
  - 10th Air Army Technical Material Depot in Rakovník
  - 10th Air Army Ammunition Depot in Chrast with a detachment in Rakovník
  - 10th Air Army Signals and Electronic Support Maintenance Center in Olomouc
  - Air Force Training Base in Kuchyňa for live fire exercises
    - 77th Air Base and Electronic Support Company
  - 1st Air Force Training Center in Ostrava training troops for maintenance units
  - 2nd Air Force Training Center in Olomouc training troops for air base operationing units
  - Air Force Electronic Support Training Center in Prostějov training troops for electronic support units

===== 1st Fighter Division =====
- 1st Fighter Division in Bechyně
  - 4th Fighter Regiment in Pardubice
    - 4th Fighter Regiment Command Post
    - 1st Fighter Squadron flying MiG-21MF
    - 2nd Fighter Squadron flying MiG-21MF
    - 3rd Fighter Squadron flying MiG-21MA
    - 6th Air Base Battalion
    - 22nd Electronic Support Battalion
  - 5th Fighter Regiment in Dobřany
    - 5th Fighter Regiment Command Post
    - 1st Fighter Squadron flying MiG-21MF
    - 2nd Fighter Squadron flying MiG-21MF
    - 3rd Fighter Squadron flying MiG-21MA
    - 18th Air Base Battalion
    - 3rd Electronic Support Battalion
  - 9th Fighter Regiment in Bechyně
    - 9th Fighter Regiment Command Post
    - 1st Fighter Squadron flying MiG-21PF
    - 2nd Fighter Squadron flying MiG-21PF
    - 3rd Fighter Squadron flying MiG-21PF
    - 4th Fighter Squadron flying MiG-21PFM
    - 10th Air Base Battalion
    - 10th Electronic Support Battalion
  - 31st Signal and Radio-technical Service Battalion in Bechyně
  - 31st Air Force Maintenance Battalion in Dobřany

===== 34th Fighter-Bomber Division =====
- Division Headquarters in Čáslav
  - 6th Fighter-Bomber Regiment in Přerov
    - 6th Fighter-Bomber Regiment Command Post
    - 1st Fighter-Bomber Squadron flying MiG-21MF
    - 2nd Fighter-Bomber Squadron flying Su-22M4
    - 11th Air Base Battalion
    - 1st Electronic Support Battalion
  - 20th Fighter-Bomber Regiment in Náměšť nad Oslavou
    - 20th Fighter-Bomber Regiment Command Post
    - 1st Fighter-Bomber Squadron flying Su-22M4
    - 2nd Fighter-Bomber Squadron flying Su-22M4
    - 19th Air Base Battalion
    - 51st Electronic Support Battalion
  - 28th Fighter Bomber Regiment in Čáslav
    - 28th Fighter-Bomber Regiment Command Post
    - 1st Fighter-Bomber Squadron flying MiG-23BN
    - 2nd Fighter-Bomber Squadron flying MiG-23BN
    - 21st Air Base Battalion
    - 7th Electronic Support Battalion
  - 30th Ground Attack Regiment in Pardubice
    - 30th Ground Attack Regiment Command Post
    - 1st Ground Attack Squadron flying Su-25K
    - 2nd Ground Attack Squadron flying Su-25K
    - 22nd Air Base Battalion
    - 12th Electronic Support Battalion
  - 34th Signal and Radio-technical Service Battalion in Čáslav
  - 34th Air Force Maintenance Battalion in Čáslav

=== Air Defence Command ===
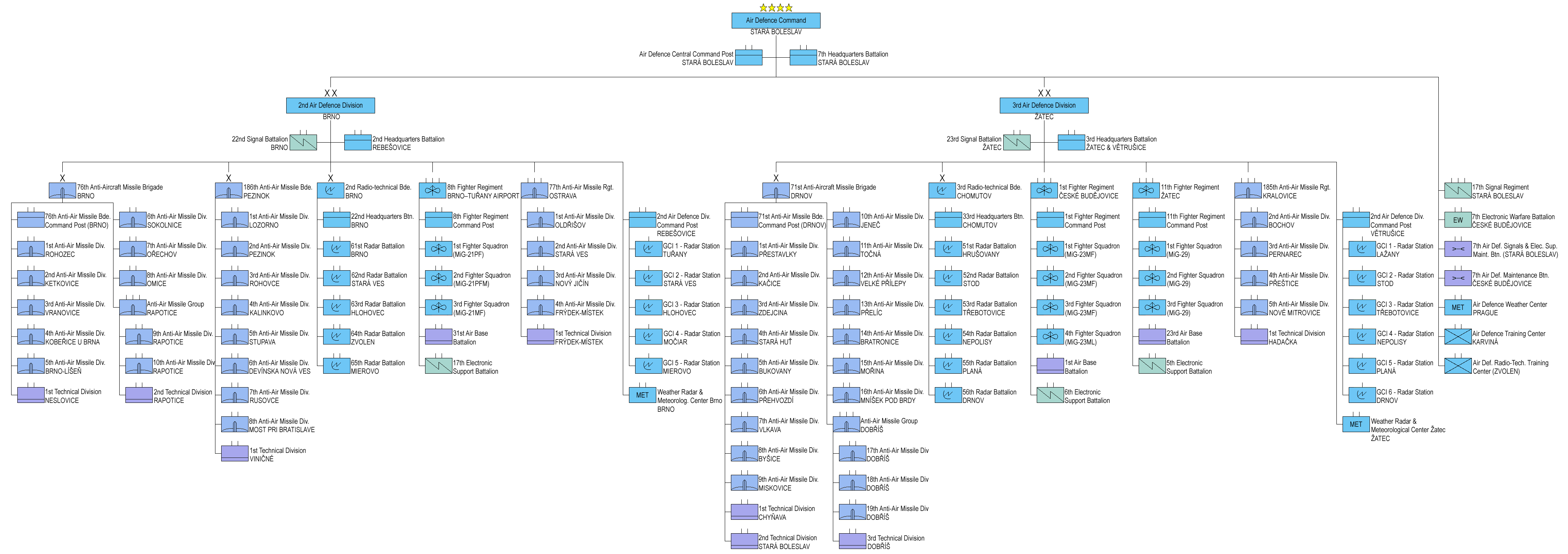
Air Defence Command Structure in 1989 (click to enlarge)

- Air Defence Command in Stará Boleslav (named: 7th Air Defence Army until 1976)
  - Air Defence Central Command Post in Stará Boleslav
  - 7th Headquarters Battalion in Stará Boleslav
  - 17th Signal Regiment in Stará Boleslav
  - 7th Electronic Warfare Battalion in České Budějovice
    - Command and Control Company
    - On-board Radar Jammer Company
    - Radio Navigation and VHF Signal Jammer Company
  - 7th Air Defence Signals and Electronic Support Maintenance Battalion in Stará Boleslav
  - 7th Air Defence Maintenance Battalion in České Budějovice
  - Air Defence Weather Center in Prague
    - Slovakia Weather Forecasting Center in Bratislava
  - Air Defence Training Center in Karviná training troops for anti-aircraft missile units
  - Air Defence Radio-technical Training Center in Zvolen training troops for radio-technical units

==== 2nd Air Defence Division ====
- 2nd Air Defence Division in Brno
  - 2nd Air Defence Division Command Post in Rebešovice
    - Ground Control Intercept 1 - Tuřany radar station
    - Ground Control Intercept 2 - Stará Ves nad Ondřejnicí radar station
    - Ground Control Intercept 3 - Hlohovec radar station
    - Ground Control Intercept 4 - Močiar radar station
    - Ground Control Intercept 5 - Mierovo radar station
  - 2nd Headquarters Battalion in Rebešovice
  - 8th Fighter Regiment at Brno–Tuřany Airport
    - 8th Fighter Regiment Command Post
    - 1st Fighter Squadron flying MiG-21PF
    - 2nd Fighter Squadron flying MiG-21PF
    - 3rd Fighter Squadron flying MiG-21PFM
    - 31st Air Base Battalion
    - 17th Electronic Support Battalion
  - 76th Anti-Aircraft Missile Brigade in Brno defending the city of Brno
    - 76th Anti-Aircraft Missile Brigade Command Post at Brno–Tuřany Airport
    - 1st Anti-Aircraft Missile Division in Rohozec with S-75M Volkhov high-altitude air defence systems
    - 2nd Anti-Aircraft Missile Division in Ketkovice with S-75M Volkhov high-altitude air defence systems
    - 3rd Anti-Aircraft Missile Division in Vranovice with S-75M Volkhov high-altitude air defence systems
    - 4th Anti-Aircraft Missile Division in Kobeřice u Brna with S-75M Volkhov high-altitude air defence systems
    - 5th Anti-Aircraft Missile Division in Brno-Líšeň with S-125 Neva mobile air defence systems
    - 6th Anti-Aircraft Missile Division in Sokolnice with S-125 Neva mobile air defence systems
    - 7th Anti-Aircraft Missile Division in Ořechov with S-125 Neva mobile air defence systems
    - 8th Anti-Aircraft Missile Division in Omice with S-125 Neva mobile air defence systems
    - 1st Technical Division in Neslovice
    - Anti-Aircraft Missile Group of the 76th Anti-Aircraft Missile Brigade in Rapotice
      - 9th Anti-Aircraft Missile Division in Rapotice with S-200 Vega long range air defence systems
      - 10th Anti-Aircraft Missile Division in Rapotice with S-200 Vega long range air defence systems
      - 2nd Technical Division in Rapotice
  - 77th Anti-Aircraft Missile Regiment in Ostrava defending the city of Ostrava
    - 1st Anti-Aircraft Missile Division in Oldřišov with S-75M Volkhov high-altitude air defence systems
    - 2nd Anti-Aircraft Missile Division in Stará Ves nad Ondřejnicí with S-75M Volkhov high-altitude air defence systems
    - 3rd Anti-Aircraft Missile Division in Nový Jičín with S-75M Volkhov high-altitude air defence systems
    - 4th Anti-Aircraft Missile Division in Frýdek-Místek with S-75M Volkhov high-altitude air defence systems
    - 1st Technical Division in Frýdek-Místek
  - 186th Anti-Aircraft Missile Brigade in Pezinok defending the city of Bratislava
    - 1st Anti-Aircraft Missile Division in Lozorno with S-75M Volkhov high-altitude air defence systems
    - 2nd Anti-Aircraft Missile Division in Pezinok with S-75M Volkhov high-altitude air defence systems
    - 3rd Anti-Aircraft Missile Division in Rohovce with S-75M Volkhov high-altitude air defence systems
    - 4th Anti-Aircraft Missile Division in Kalinkovo with S-75M Volkhov high-altitude air defence systems
    - 5th Anti-Aircraft Missile Division in Stupava with S-75M Volkhov high-altitude air defence systems
    - 6th Anti-Aircraft Missile Division in Devínska Nová Ves with S-75M Volkhov high-altitude air defence systems
    - 7th Anti-Aircraft Missile Division in Rusovce with S-125 Neva mobile air defence systems
    - 8th Anti-Aircraft Missile Division in Most pri Bratislave with S-125 Neva mobile air defence systems
    - 1st Technical Division in Viničné
  - 2nd Radio-technical Brigade in Brno
    - 22nd Headquarters Battalion in Brno
    - 61st Radar Battalion in Brno
      - Command Post of 61st Electronic Battalion in Brno-Tuřany
      - Command Company in Sokolnice
      - 610th Radar Company in Sokolnice operating the Tuřany radar station
      - 611th Mobile Radar Company in Moravské Budějovice
      - 612th Mobile Radar Company in Božice
      - 613th Mobile Radar Company in Lavičky
    - 62nd Radar Battalion in Stará Ves nad Ondřejnicí
      - Command Post of 62nd Electronic Battalion in Stará Ves nad Ondřejnicí
      - Command Company in Stará Ves nad Ondřejnicí
      - 620th Radar Company in Stará Ves nad Ondřejnicí operating the Stará Ves nad Ondřejnicí radar station
      - 621st Mobile Radar Company in Chropyně
      - 622nd Mobile Radar Company in Polička
    - 63rd Radar Battalion in Hlohovec
      - Command Post of 63rd Electronic Battalion in Hlohovec
      - Command Company in Hlohovec
      - 630th Radar Company in Hlohovec operating the Hlohovec radar station
      - 631st Mobile Radar Company in Starý Hrozenkov
      - 632nd Mobile Radar Company in Šurany
    - 64th Radar Battalion in Zvolen
      - Command Post of 64th Electronic Battalion in Močiar
      - Command Company in Zvolen
      - 640th Radar Company in Močiar operating the Močiar radar station
      - 641st Mobile Radar Company in Cerovo
      - 642nd Mobile Radar Company in Veľká Ida
    - 65th Radar Battalion in Mierovo
      - Command Post of 65th Electronic Battalion in Mierovo
      - Command Company in Mierovo
      - 650th Radar Company in Mierovo operating the Mierovo radar station
      - 651st Mobile Radar Company in Moravská Nová Ves
      - 652nd Mobile Radar Company in Zohor
      - 653rd Mobile Radar Company in Rusovce
  - 22nd Signal Battalion in Brno
  - Weather Radar and Meteorological Center Brno

==== 3rd Air Defence Division ====
- 3rd Air Defence Division in Žatec
  - 3rd Air Defence Division Command Post in Větrušice
    - Ground Control Intercept 1 - Lažany radar station
    - Ground Control Intercept 2 - Stod radar station
    - Ground Control Intercept 3 - Třebotovice radar station
    - Ground Control Intercept 4 - Nepolisy radar station
    - Ground Control Intercept 5 - Planá radar station
    - Ground Control Intercept 6 - Drnov radar station
  - 3rd Headquarters Battalion in Žatec and Větrušice
  - 1st Fighter Regiment in České Budějovice
    - 1st Fighter Regiment Command Post
    - 1st Fighter Squadron flying MiG-23MF
    - 2nd Fighter Squadron flying MiG-23MF
    - 3rd Fighter Squadron flying MiG-23MF
    - 4th Fighter Squadron flying MiG-23ML
    - 1st Air Base Battalion
    - 6th Electronic Support Battalion
  - 11th Fighter Regiment in Žatec
    - 11th Fighter Regiment Command Post
    - 1st Fighter Squadron flying MiG-29
    - 2nd Fighter Squadron flying MiG-29
    - 3rd Fighter Squadron flying MiG-29
    - 23rd Air Base Battalion
    - 5th Electronic Support Battalion
  - 71st Anti-Aircraft Missile Brigade in Drnov defending the Central Bohemian Region with the capital Prague
    - 71st Anti-Aircraft Missile Brigade Command Post in Drnov
    - 1st Anti-Aircraft Missile Division in Přestavlky with S-75M Volkhov high-altitude air defence systems
    - 2nd Anti-Aircraft Missile Division in Kačice with S-75M Volkhov high-altitude air defence systems
    - 3rd Anti-Aircraft Missile Division in Zdejcina with S-75M Volkhov high-altitude air defence systems
    - 4th Anti-Aircraft Missile Division in Stará Huť with S-75M Volkhov high-altitude air defence systems
    - 5th Anti-Aircraft Missile Division in Bukovany with S-75M Volkhov high-altitude air defence systems
    - 6th Anti-Aircraft Missile Division in Přehvozdí with S-75M Volkhov high-altitude air defence systems
    - 7th Anti-Aircraft Missile Division in Vlkava with S-75M Volkhov high-altitude air defence systems
    - 8th Anti-Aircraft Missile Division in Byšice with S-75M Volkhov high-altitude air defence systems
    - 9th Anti-Aircraft Missile Division in Miskovice with S-125 Neva mobile air defence systems
    - 10th Anti-Aircraft Missile Division in Jeneč with S-125 Neva mobile air defence systems
    - 11th Anti-Aircraft Missile Division in Točná with S-125 Neva mobile air defence systems
    - 12th Anti-Aircraft Missile Division in Velké Přílepy with S-125 Neva mobile air defence systems
    - 13th Anti-Aircraft Missile Division in Přelíc with S-125 Neva mobile air defence systems
    - 14th Anti-Aircraft Missile Division in Bratronice with S-125 Neva mobile air defence systems
    - 15th Anti-Aircraft Missile Division in Mořina with S-125 Neva mobile air defence systems
    - 16th Anti-Aircraft Missile Division in Mníšek pod Brdy with S-125 Neva mobile air defence systems
    - 1st Technical Division in Chyňava
    - 2nd Technical Division in Stará Boleslav
    - Anti-Aircraft Missile Group of the 71st Anti-Aircraft Missile Brigade in Dobříš
      - 17th Anti-Aircraft Missile Division in Dobříš with S-200 Vega long range air defence systems
      - 18th Anti-Aircraft Missile Division in Dobříš with S-200 Vega long range air defence systems
      - 19th Anti-Aircraft Missile Division in Dobříš with S-200 Vega long range air defence systems
      - 3rd Technical Division in Dobříš
  - 185th Anti-Aircraft Missile Regiment in Kralovice defending the city of Plzeň
    - 2nd Anti-Aircraft Missile Division in Bochov with S-75M Volkhov high-altitude air defence systems
    - 3rd Anti-Aircraft Missile Division in Pernarec with S-75M Volkhov high-altitude air defence systems
    - 4th Anti-Aircraft Missile Division in Přeštice with S-75M Volkhov high-altitude air defence systems
    - 5th Anti-Aircraft Missile Division in Nové Mitrovice with S-75M Volkhov high-altitude air defence systems
    - 1st Technical Division in Hadačka
  - 3rd Radio-technical Brigade in Chomutov
    - 33rd Headquarters Battalion in Chomutov
    - 51st Radar Battalion in Hrušovany
      - Command Post of 51st Electronic Battalion in Lažany
      - Command Company in Lažany
      - 510th Radar Company Lažany operating the Lažany radar station
      - 511th Mobile Radar Company in Mikulášovice
      - 512th Mobile Radar Company in Martiněves
    - 52nd Radar Battalion in Stod
      - Command Post of 52nd Electronic Battalion in Stod
      - Command Company in Stod
      - 520th Radar Company in Stod operating the Stod radar station
      - 521st Mobile Radar Company in Poleň
      - 522nd Mobile Radar Company in Zhůří
      - 523rd Mobile Radar Company in Katovice
    - 53rd Radar Battalion in Třebotovice
      - Command Post of 53rd Electronic Battalion in Třebotovice
      - Command Company in Třebotovice
      - 530th Radar Company in Třebotovice operating the Třebotovice radar station
      - 531st Mobile Radar Company in Třeboň
      - 532nd Mobile Radar Company in Přední Výtoň
      - 533rd Mobile Radar Company in Horní Vltavice
      - 534th Mobile Radar Company in Nová Bystřice
    - 54th Radar Battalion in Nepolisy
      - Command Post of 54th Electronic Battalion in Nepolisy
      - Command Company in Nepolisy
      - 540th Radar Company in Nepolisy operating the Nepolisy radar station
      - 541st Mobile Radar Company in Chrášťany
      - 542nd Mobile Radar Company in Senožaty
      - 543rd Mobile Radar Company in Adršpach
    - 55th Radar Battalion in Planá
      - Command Post of 55th Electronic Battalion in Planá
      - Command Company in Planá
      - 550th Radar Company in Planá operating the Planá radar station
      - 551st Mobile Radar Company in Aš
      - 552nd Mobile Radar Company in Hřebečná
    - 56th Radar Battalion in Drnov
      - Command Post of 56th Electronic Battalion in Drnov
      - Command Company in Drnov
      - 560th Radar Company in Drnov operating the Drnov radar station
      - 561st Mobile Radar Company in Jesenice
      - 562nd Mobile Radar Company in Břasy
      - 563rd Mobile Radar Company in Ratiboř
  - 23rd Signal Battalion in Žatec
  - Weather Radar and Meteorological Center Žatec

== Regimental and Battalion Organization ==
Below follow the organizations of the regiments in the Tank and Motor Rifle divisions:

By the end of the Cold War the standard main battle tank in the Czechoslovak tank regiments was the T-72M or T-72M1 of which Czechoslovakia had built 973. Some of the tank units in motor rifle divisions still fielded the locally produced T-54A.

- Tank Regiment:
  - Command Platoon
  - Reconnaissance Company (3x Reconnaissance Platoons)
  - 3x Tank Battalions (each: Command Squad, 3x Tank Companies, Maintenance Squad, Supply Platoon, Battalion First Aid Station)
  - Motor Rifle Company (Only in tank regiments of tank divisions)
  - Rocket Launcher Battery (Command Platoon, 3x Firing Platoons with two RM-51 130mm multiple rocket launchers each, Supply Platoon)
  - Anti-aircraft Battery (Command Squad, 2x Anti-aircraft Platoons with 6x M53/59 Praga twin 30mm self-propelled anti-aircraft guns each, Supply Squad. By 1989 only the 1st and 9th Tank divisions had replaced the 6x M53/59 Praga in their 2nd Anti-aircraft platoon with 4x 9K35 Strela-10 tracked self-propelled anti-aircraft missile systems. With the end of the Cold War further acquisitions for the other tank divisions were canceled.)
  - Signal Company (Signal Platoon, Radio Platoon)
  - Engineer Company (Engineer Platoon, Machinery Platoon)
  - Chemical Defence Company (Command Squad, Radiation and Chemical Reconnaissance Platoon, Special Decontamination Platoon)
  - Maintenance Company (Tracked Vehicles Workshop, Wheeled Vehicles Workshop, Armament Workshop, Signal Workshop, Special Workshop, Vehicle-towing Squad)
  - Supply Company (2x Transport Platoons, Materiel Supply Squad, Water Treatment Squad, Food Supply Squad)
  - Regimental First Aid Station

Motor rifle units fielded the locally produced BVP-1 tracked infantry fighting vehicle and the OT-64 wheeled armored transports vehicle.

- Motor Rifle Regiment:
  - Command Platoon
  - Reconnaissance Company (3x Reconnaissance Platoons)
  - 3x Motor Rifle Battalions (each: Command Squad, 3x Motor Rifle Companies, Mortar Battery, Anti-tank Guided Missile Platoon, Anti-aircraft Platoon, Signal Squad, Maintenance Squad, Supply Platoon, Battalion First Aid Station)
  - Tank Battalion (Command Squad, 3x Tank Companies, Maintenance Squad, Supply Platoon, Battalion First Aid Station)
  - Anti-tank Guided Missile Battery (Command Squad, 3x Firing Platoons, ATGM Training Squad; armed with Konkurs anti-tank guided missiles)
  - Rocket Launcher Battery (Command Platoon, 3x Firing Platoons with two RM-51 130mm multiple rocket launchers each, Supply Platoon)
  - Anti-aircraft Battery (Command Squad, 3x Anti-aircraft Platoons with 6x M53/59 Praga twin 30mm self-propelled anti-aircraft guns each, Supply Squad. By 1989 only the 15th Motor Rifle division had replaced the 6x M53/59 Praga in its 2nd Anti-aircraft platoon with 4x 9K35 Strela-10 tracked self-propelled anti-aircraft missile systems. With the end of the Cold War further acquisitions for the other motor rifle divisions were canceled.)
  - Signal Company (Signal Platoon, Radio Platoon)
  - Engineer Company (Engineer Platoon, Machinery Platoon)
  - Chemical Defence Company (Command Squad, Radiation and Chemical Reconnaissance Platoon, Special Decontamination Platoon)
  - Maintenance Company (Tracked Vehicles Workshop, Wheeled Vehicles Workshop, Armament Workshop, Signal Workshop, Special Workshop, Vehicle-towing Squad)
  - Supply Company (2x Transport Platoons, Materiel Supply Squad, Water Treatment Squad, Food Supply Squad)
  - Regimental First Aid Station

Divisional artillery regiments were organized as follows: (Note: 1st Army divisional artillery regiments replaced their 122mm M1938 towed howitzers with 122mm 2S1 Gvozdika self-propelled howitzers in the late 1980s)

- Artillery Regiment:
  - Command and Artillery Reconnaissance Battery
  - 1st Artillery Division with 18x 122mm M1938 towed howitzers (Command Platoon, 3x Firing batteries, Signal Platoon, Supply Platoon, Maintenance Platoon, First Aid Station)
  - 2nd Artillery Division with 18x 122mm M1938 towed howitzers (Command Platoon, 3x Firing batteries, Signal Platoon, Supply Platoon, Maintenance Platoon, First Aid Station)
  - 3rd Artillery Division with 18x 152mm SpGH DANA self-propelled howitzers in tank divisions, respectively 18x 152mm M1937 S towed howitzers in motor rifle divisions (Command Platoon, 3x Firing batteries, Signal Platoon, Supply Platoon, Maintenance Platoon, First Aid Station)
  - Rocket-Launcher Division with 18x RM-70 122mm multiple rocket launchers (Command Platoon, 3x Firing batteries, Signal Platoon, Supply Platoon, Maintenance Platoon, First Aid Station)
  - Anti-Tank Division with 12x 100mm vz. 53 anti-tank cannons and 6x BRDM-2 in the anti-tank version armed with Konkurs anti-tank missiles (Only in Motor Rifle Divisions; Command Platoon, 3x Firing batteries, Signal Platoon, Supply Platoon, Maintenance Platoon, First Aid Station)
  - Fire Support Battery
  - Sound-ranging and Reconnaissance Battery
  - Supply Battery
  - Maintenance Battery

Divisional anti-aircraft missile regiment were organized as follows and began to introduce either 20x 2K12 Kub or 20x 9K33 Osa surface-to-air missile systems in the early 1980s. When the Cold War ended all divisions except for the 13th Tank division and the 3rd and 15th Motor Rifle divisions had received Kub or Osa systems:

- Anti-aircraft Missile Regiment:
  - Headquarters Battery
  - 1st Firing Battery
  - 2nd Firing Battery
  - 3rd Firing Battery
  - 4th Firing Battery
  - 5th Firing Battery
  - Technical Battery

Civil defence regiments supported the authorities during times of national disaster:

- Civil Defence Regiment:
  - Engineer Battalion
  - Chemical Defence Battalion
  - Premedical Care Battalion

Divisional reconnaissance battalions were organized as follows:

- Reconnaissance Battalion:
  - Headquarters and Staff
  - 1st Reconnaissance Company
  - 2nd Reconnaissance Company
  - Long Range Reconnaissance Company
  - SIGINT Company
  - Signal Platoon
  - Support Platoon

Divisional separate rocket launcher divisions were organized as follows:

- Separate Rocket Launcher Division:
  - Command Battery
  - 1st Firing Battery with 2x ballistic missile launchers
  - 2nd Firing Battery with 2x ballistic missile launchers
  - Signal Battery
  - Technical Support Platoon with 4x missile reloads

Divisional Chemical Defence battalions were organized as follows:

- Chemical Defence Battalion:
  - Radiation and Chemical Reconnaissance Platoon
  - 1st Special Decontamination Company
  - 2nd Special Decontamination Company
  - Maintenance Platoon
