= 4th Army (Czechoslovakia) =

The 4th Army was a field army of the Czechoslovak People's Army, active from 1958 to 1965 and 1969–1991. In its second formation its headquarters was in Písek.

The army was first formed from the 4th Rifle Corps on 15 July 1958.

In the 1980s the force included the 2nd Motor Rifle Division, 15th Motor Rifle Division, 4th Tank Division and 9th Tank Division, as well as other subordinate units including 321st Army Missile Brigade.

== Structure ==
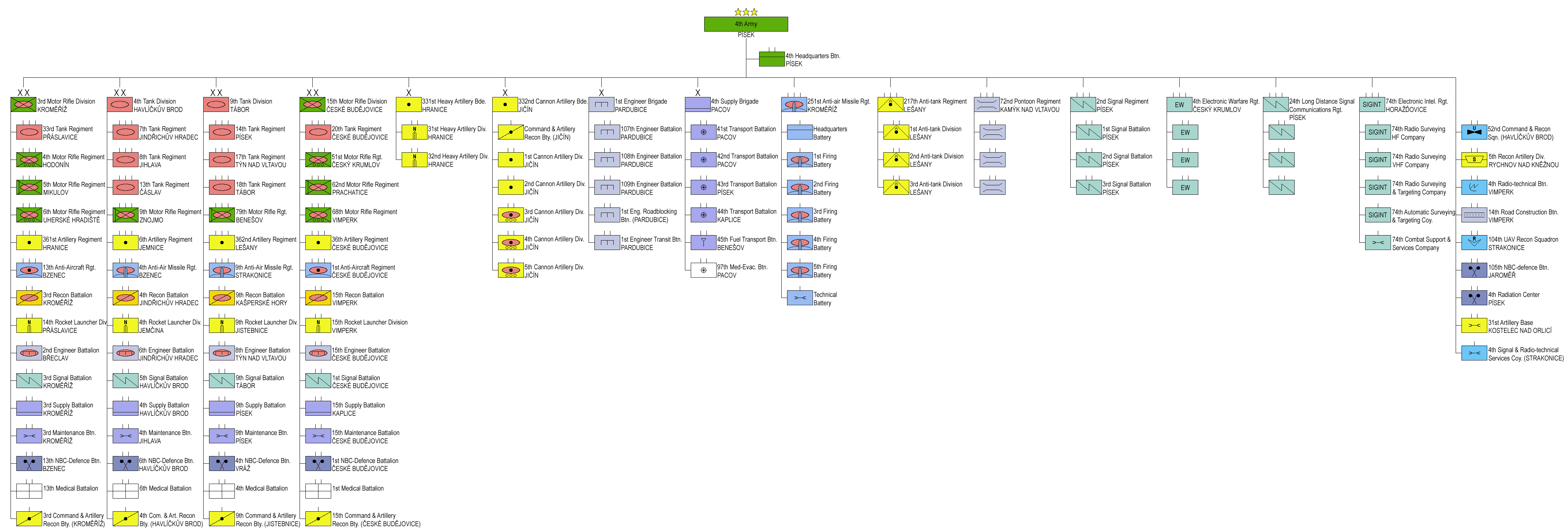
4th Army Structure in 1989 (click to enlarge)

- 4th Army in Písek:
  - 4th Headquarters Battalion in Písek
  - 3rd Motor Rifle Division in Kroměříž (in case of full mobilization would have also formed the 26th Motor Rifle Division)
    - 33rd Tank Regiment in Přáslavice
    - 4th Motor Rifle Regiment in Hodonín with OT-64 wheeled armored transports vehicles
    - 5th Motor Rifle Regiment in Mikulov with BVP-1 tracked infantry fighting vehicles
    - 6th Motor Rifle Regiment in Uherské Hradiště with OT-64 wheeled armored transports vehicles
    - 361st Artillery Regiment in Hranice
    - 14th Separate Rocket Launcher Division in Přáslavice with 9K52 Luna-M artillery rocket systems
    - 3rd Command and Artillery Reconnaissance Battery in Kroměříž
    - 13th Anti-Aircraft Regiment in Bzenec
    - 3rd Reconnaissance Battalion in Kroměříž
    - 2nd Engineer Battalion in Břeclav
    - 3rd Signal Battalion in Kroměříž
    - 3rd Supply Battalion in Kroměříž
    - 3rd Maintenance Battalion in Kroměříž
    - 13th Chemical Defence Battalion in Bzenec
    - 13th Medical Battalion
  - 4th Tank Division in Havlíčkův Brod
    - 7th Tank Regiment in Jindřichův Hradec
    - 8th Tank Regiment in Jihlava
    - 13th Tank Regiment in Čáslav
    - 9th Motor Rifle Regiment in Znojmo with BVP-1 tracked infantry fighting vehicles
    - 6th Artillery Regiment in Jemnice
    - 4th Separate Rocket Launcher Division in Jemčina with 9K52 Luna-M artillery rocket systems
    - 4th Command and Artillery Reconnaissance Battery in Havlíčkův Brod
    - 4th Anti-Aircraft Missile Regiment in Bzenec with 2K12 Kub surface-to-air missile systems
    - 4th Reconnaissance Battalion in Jindřichův Hradec
    - 6th Engineer Battalion in Jindřichův Hradec
    - 5th Signal Battalion in Havlíčkův Brod
    - 4th Supply Battalion in Havlíčkův Brod
    - 4th Maintenance Battalion in Jihlava
    - 6th Chemical Defence Battalion in Havlíčkův Brod
    - 6th Medical Battalion
  - 9th Tank Division in Tábor
    - 14th Tank Regiment in Písek
    - 17th Tank Regiment in Týn nad Vltavou
    - 18th Tank Regiment in Tábor
    - 79th Motor Rifle Regiment in Benešov with BVP-1 tracked infantry fighting vehicles
    - 362nd Artillery Regiment in Lešany
    - 9th Separate Rocket Launcher Division in Jistebnice with OTR-21 Tochka tactical ballistic missiles
    - 9th Command and Artillery Reconnaissance Battery in Jistebnice
    - 9th Anti-Aircraft Missile Regiment in Strakonice with 2K12 Kub surface-to-air missile systems
    - 9th Reconnaissance Battalion in Kašperské Hory
    - 8th Engineer Battalion in Týn nad Vltavou
    - 9th Signal Battalion in Tábor
    - 9th Supply Battalion in Písek
    - 9th Maintenance Battalion in Písek
    - 4th Chemical Defence Battalion in Vráž
    - 4th Medical Battalion
  - 15th Motor Rifle Division in České Budějovice (in case of full mobilization would have also formed the 18th Motor Rifle Division)
    - 20th Tank Regiment in České Budějovice
    - 51st Motor Rifle Regiment in Český Krumlov with OT-64 wheeled armored transports vehicles
    - 62nd Motor Rifle Regiment in Prachatice with BVP-1 tracked infantry fighting vehicles
    - 68th Motor Rifle Regiment in Vimperk with OT-64 wheeled armored transports vehicles
    - 36th Artillery Regiment in České Budějovice
    - 15th Separate Rocket Launcher Division in Vimperk with 9K52 Luna-M artillery rocket systems
    - 15th Command and Artillery Reconnaissance Battery in České Budějovice
    - 1st Anti-Aircraft Regiment in České Budějovice
    - 15th Reconnaissance Battalion in Vimperk
    - 15th Engineer Battalion in České Budějovice
    - 1st Signal Battalion in České Budějovice
    - 15th Supply Battalion in Kaplice
    - 15th Maintenance Battalion in České Budějovice
    - 1st Chemical Defence Battalion in České Budějovice
    - 1st Medical Battalion
  - 331st Heavy Artillery Brigade in Hranice
    - 31st Heavy Artillery Division with SS-1C Scud-B tactical ballistic missiles
    - 32nd Heavy Artillery Division with SS-1C Scud-B tactical ballistic missiles
  - 31st Artillery Base in Kostelec nad Orlicí servicing the missiles of the 331st Heavy Artillery Brigade
  - 332nd Cannon Artillery Brigade in Jičín
    - Command and Artillery Reconnaissance Battery
    - 1st Cannon Artillery Division with 18x 130mm M1954 towed howitzers
    - 2nd Cannon Artillery Division with 18x 130mm M1954 towed howitzers
    - 3rd Cannon Artillery Division with 18x 152mm SpGH DANA self-propelled howitzers
    - 4th Cannon Artillery Division with 18x 152mm SpGH DANA self-propelled howitzers
    - 5th Cannon Artillery Division with 18x 152mm SpGH DANA self-propelled howitzers
  - 1st Engineer Brigade in Pardubice
    - 107th Engineer Battalion
    - 108th Engineer Battalion
    - 109th Engineer Battalion
    - 1st Engineer Roadblocking Battalion
    - 1st Engineer Transit Battalion
  - 4th Supply Brigade in Pacov
    - 41st Transport Battalion in Pacov
    - 42nd Transport Battalion in Pacov
    - 43rd Transport Battalion in Písek
    - 44th Transport Battalion in Kaplice
    - 45th Fuel Transport Battalion in Benešov
    - 97th Medical Evacuation Battalion in Pacov
  - 251st Anti-aircraft Missile Regiment in Kroměříž with 20x 2K12 Kub systems
    - Headquarters Battery
    - 1st Firing Battery
    - 2nd Firing Battery
    - 3rd Firing Battery
    - 4th Firing Battery
    - 5th Firing Battery
    - Technical Battery
  - 217th Anti-tank Regiment in Lešany
    - 1st Anti-tank Division with 12x 100mm vz. 53 anti-tank cannons and 6x BRDM-2 vehicles in the anti-tank variant with Konkurs anti-tank missiles
    - 2nd Anti-tank Division with 12x 100mm vz. 53 anti-tank cannons and 6x BRDM-2 vehicles in the anti-tank variant with Konkurs anti-tank missiles
    - 3rd Anti-tank Division with 12x 100mm vz. 53 anti-tank cannons and 6x BRDM-2 vehicles in the anti-tank variant with Konkurs anti-tank missiles
  - 72nd Pontoon Regiment in Kamýk nad Vltavou
  - 2nd Signal Regiment in Písek
    - 1st Signal Battalion
    - 2nd Signal Battalion
    - 3rd Signal Battalion
  - 24th Long Distance Signal Communications Regiment in Písek
  - 4th Electronic Warfare Regiment in Český Krumlov
  - 74th Special Purpose Electronic Intelligence Regiment in Horažďovice
    - 74th Radio Surveying HF Company
    - 74th Radio Surveying VHF Company
    - 74th Radio Surveying and Targeting Company
    - 74th Automatic Radio Surveying and Targeting Company
    - 74th Combat Support and Services Company
  - 5th Reconnaissance Artillery Division in Rychnov nad Kněžnou
  - 4th Radio-technical Battalion in Vimperk
    - Light Radio-technical Company
    - Heavy Radio-technical Company
    - Signal Company
  - 105th Chemical Defence Battalion in Jaroměř
  - 14th Road Construction Battalion in Vimperk
  - 4th Radiation Center in Písek
  - 52nd Command and Reconnaissance Squadron in Havlíčkův Brod
    - 3rd Helicopter Detachment with 2x Mi-2 helicopters to support the 3rd Motor Rifle Division in wartime
    - 4th Helicopter Detachment with 2x Mi-2 helicopters to support the 4th Tank Division in wartime
    - 9th Helicopter Detachment with 2x Mi-2 helicopters to support the 9th Tank Division in wartime
    - 15th Helicopter Detachment with 2x Mi-2 helicopters to support the 15th Motor Rifle Division in wartime
    - 52nd Air Base and Electronic Support Company
  - 104th Unmanned Aerial Vehicle Reconnaissance Squadron in Strakonice with Tupolev Tu-143 VR-3 Rejs drones
  - 4th Signal and Radio-technical Services Company in Strakonice
