= Mierovo =

Mierovo Béke
- Municipality
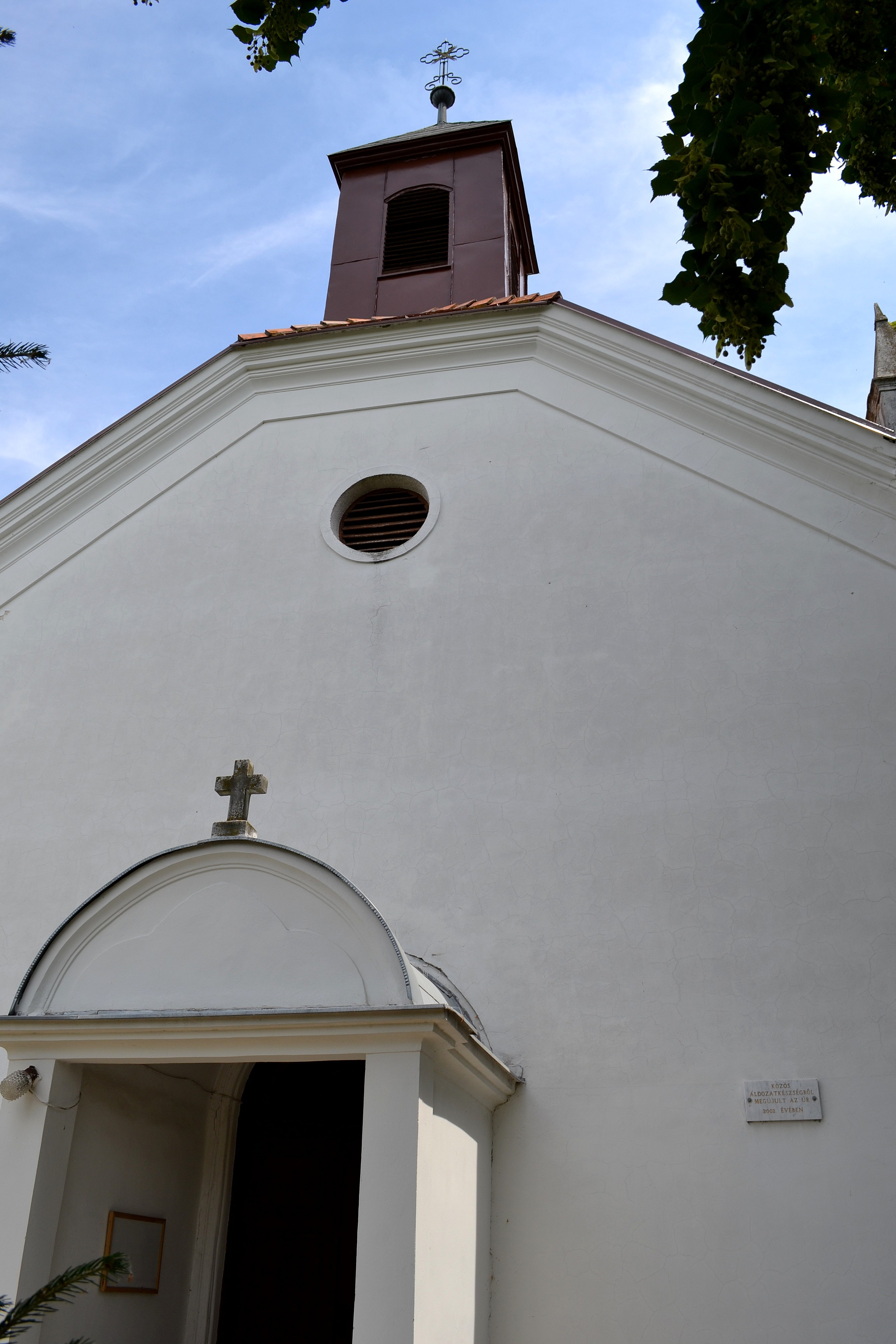

- Flag

- Location of Mierovo in the Trnava Region Location of Mierovo in Slovakia
- Coordinates: 48.07°N 17.39°E
- Country: Slovakia
- Region: Trnava Region
- District: Dunajská Streda District
- First mentioned: 1260

Government
  - Mayor: Donát Állo (Party of the Hungarian Coalition)

Area
  - Total: 6.12 km^{2} (2.36 sq mi)
- Elevation: 124 m (407 ft)

Population (2025)
  - Total: 456

Ethnicity
  - Hungarians: 82,34 %
  - Slovaks: 15,27 %
- Time zone: UTC+1 (CET)
  - Summer (DST): UTC+2 (CEST)
- Postal code: 930 41
- Area code: +421 31
- Vehicle registration plate (until 2022): DS
- Website: www.mierovo.sk

Mierovo (Hungarian: Béke, pronounced [ˈbeːkɛ]) is a village and municipality in the Dunajská Streda District in the Trnava Region of south-west Slovakia.

== Geography ==
The municipality lies at an altitude of 124 metres (407 ft) and covers an area of 6.12 km^{2} (2.36 sq mi) (2025).

== History ==
In the 9th century, the territory of Mierovo became part of the Kingdom of Hungary. The village was first recorded in 1260 by its Hungarian name as Weke. Until the end of World War I, it was part of Hungary and fell within the Somorja district of Pozsony County. After the Austro-Hungarian army disintegrated in November 1918, Czechoslovak troops occupied the area. After the Treaty of Trianon of 1920, the village became officially part of Czechoslovakia. In November 1938, the First Vienna Award granted the area to Hungary and it was held by Hungary until 1945. After Soviet occupation in 1945, Czechoslovak administration returned and the village became officially part of Czechoslovakia in 1947.

== Population ==
Population statistic (10 years)
Year	1995	2005	2015	2025
Count	388	412	461	456
Difference		+6.18%	+11.89%	−1.08%

Population statistic
Year	2024	2025
Count	461	456
Difference		−1.08%

It has a population of 456 people (31 December 2025).

In 1910, the village had 388, for the most part, Hungarian inhabitants.

=== Ethnicity ===
Census 2021 (1+ %)
Ethnicity	Number	Fraction
Hungarian	335	75.45%
Slovak	107	24.09%
Not found out	19	4.27%
Total	444	

In year 2021 was 444 people by ethnicity 335 as Hungarian, 107 as Slovak, 19 as Not found out, 3 as Czech, 3 as Romani, 1 as Ukrainian, 1 as Austrian and 1 as Other.

Note on population: The difference values of population numbers in the table "Population statistic" and in the sections "Ethnicity" & "Religion" is caused by the use of various statistical methods.

=== Religion ===
Census 2021 (1+ %)
Religion	Number	Fraction
Roman Catholic Church	308	69.37%
None	103	23.2%
Not found out	25	5.63%
Total	444	

In year 2021 was 444 people by religion 308 from Roman Catholic Church, 103 from None, 25 from Not found out, 2 from Christian Congregations in Slovakia, 2 from Greek Catholic Church, 1 from Other, 1 from Evangelical Church, 1 from Buddhism and 1 from Ad hoc movements.
