= Nepolisy =

- Municipality
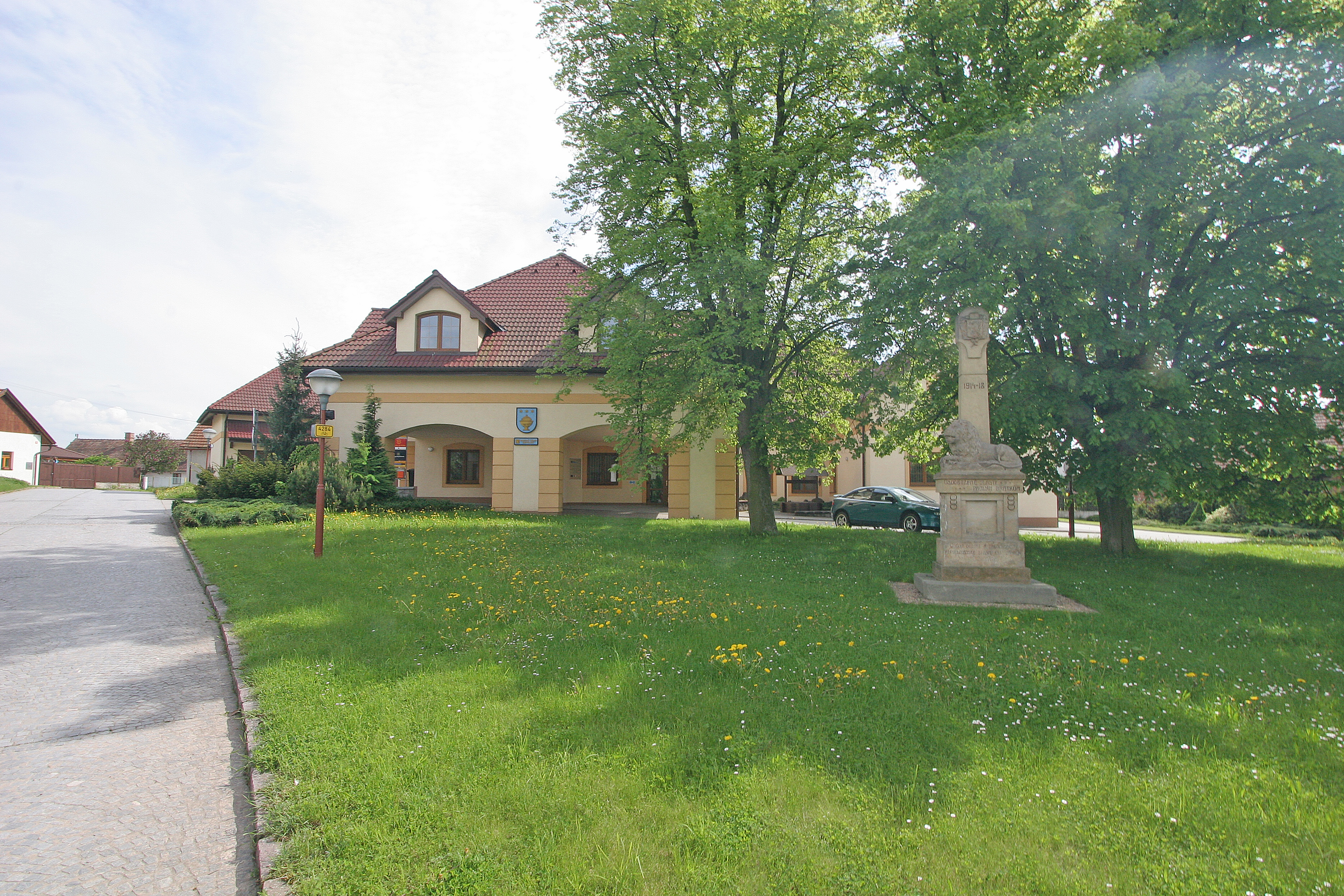
- Municipal office

- Flag Coat of arms

- Location in the Czech Republic
- Coordinates: 50°11′32″N 15°27′48″E
- Country: Czech Republic
- Region: Hradec Králové
- District: Hradec Králové
- First mentioned: 1299

Area
  - Total: 13.55 km^{2} (5.23 sq mi)
- Elevation: 232 m (761 ft)

Population (2026-01-01)
  - Total: 990
  - Density: 73/km^{2} (190/sq mi)
- Time zone: UTC+1 (CET)
  - Summer (DST): UTC+2 (CEST)
- Postal codes: 503 51, 503 63
- Website: www.nepolisy.cz

Nepolisy (German: Nepolis) is a municipality and village in Hradec Králové District in the Hradec Králové Region of the Czech Republic. It has about 1,000 inhabitants.

== Administrative division ==
Nepolisy consists of three municipal parts (in brackets population according to the 2021 census):

- Nepolisy (720)
- Luková (96)
- Zadražany (140)

== Demographics ==
Historical population
Year	Pop.	±%
1869	1,066	—
1880	1,169	+9.7%
1890	1,163	−0.5%
1900	1,220	+4.9%
1910	1,342	+10.0%
1921	1,291	−3.8%
1930	1,330	+3.0%
1950	1,055	−20.7%
1961	1,096	+3.9%
1970	1,014	−7.5%
1980	936	−7.7%
1991	848	−9.4%
2001	838	−1.2%
2011	959	+14.4%
2021	956	−0.3%
Source: Censuses
