= Chyšky =

- Municipality
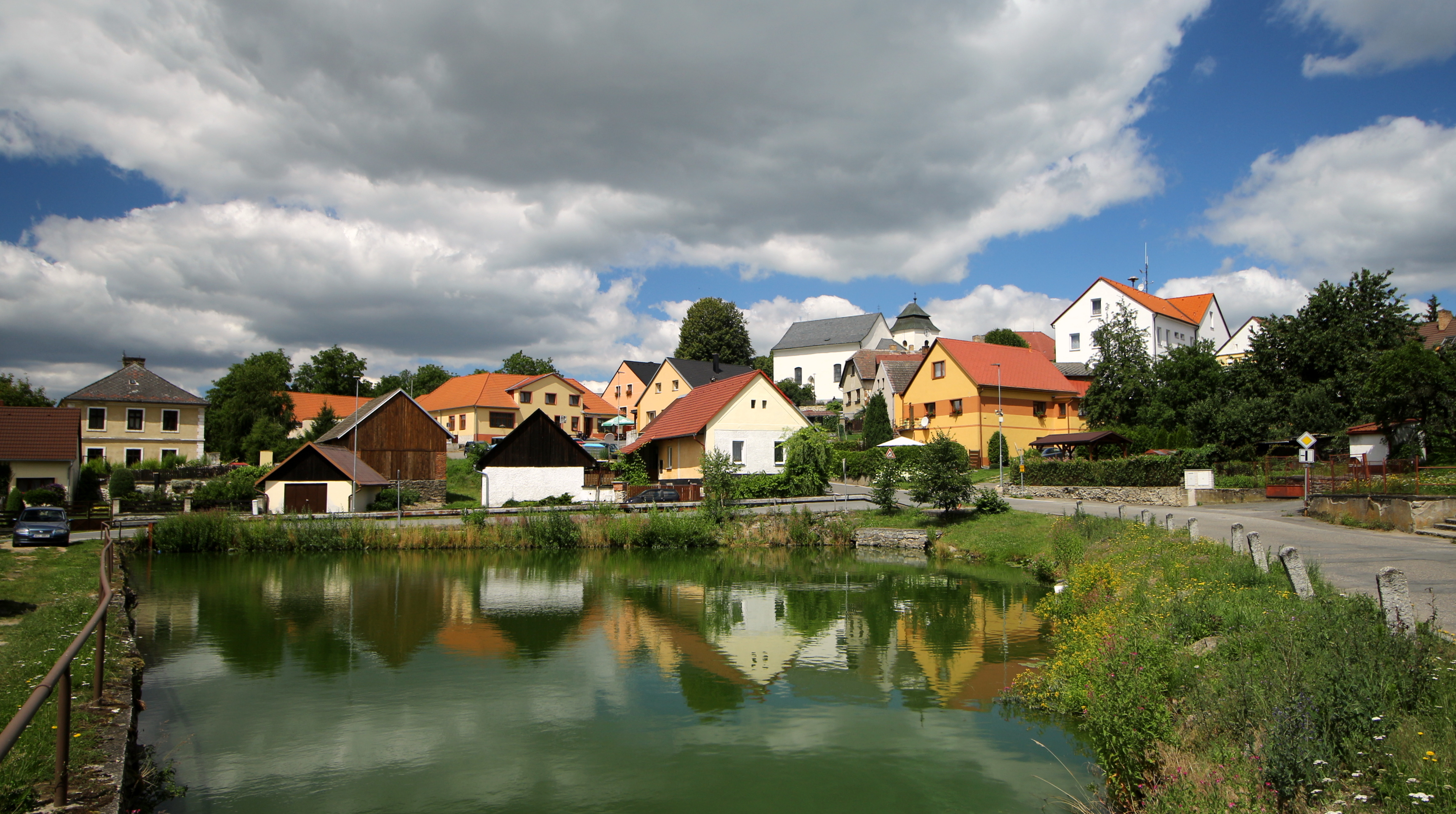
- View to the centre of Chyšky

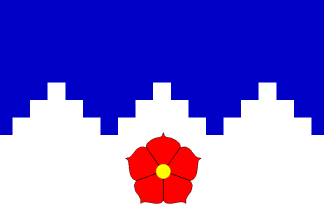
- Flag Coat of arms

- Location in the Czech Republic
- Coordinates: 49°31′25″N 14°25′39″E
- Country: Czech Republic
- Region: South Bohemian
- District: Písek
- First mentioned: 1291

Area
  - Total: 30.32 km^{2} (11.71 sq mi)
- Elevation: 666 m (2,185 ft)

Population (2026-01-01)
  - Total: 1,054
  - Density: 34.76/km^{2} (90.03/sq mi)
- Time zone: UTC+1 (CET)
  - Summer (DST): UTC+2 (CEST)
- Postal code: 398 53
- Website: www.chysky.cz

Chyšky (German: Klein Chischka) is a municipality and village in Písek District in the South Bohemian Region of the Czech Republic. It has about 1,100 inhabitants.

Chyšky lies approximately 33 kilometres (21 mi) north-east of Písek, 61 km (38 mi) north of České Budějovice, and 63 km (39 mi) south of Prague.

== Administrative division ==
Chyšky consists of 20 municipal parts (in brackets population according to the 2021 census):

- Chyšky (436)
- Branišov (1)
- Branišovice (22)
- Hněvanice (39)
- Hrachov (10)
- Kvašťov (16)
- Květuš (113)
- Mezný (1)
- Nálesí (29)
- Nosetín (48)
- Nová Ves (62)
- Podchýšská Lhota (22)
- Radíkovy (8)
- Ratiboř (96)
- Ratibořec (43)
- Rohozov (1)
- Růžená (27)
- Vilín (13)
- Voděrady (1)
- Záluží (26)

== Demographics ==
Historical population
Year	Pop.	±%
1869	2,837	—
1880	2,739	−3.5%
1890	2,643	−3.5%
1900	2,488	−5.9%
1910	2,383	−4.2%
1921	2,284	−4.2%
1930	1,970	−13.7%
1950	1,524	−22.6%
1961	1,503	−1.4%
1970	1,337	−11.0%
1980	1,183	−11.5%
1991	1,116	−5.7%
2001	1,091	−2.2%
2011	1,019	−6.6%
2021	1,014	−0.5%
Source: Censuses
