= Přáslavice =

- Municipality
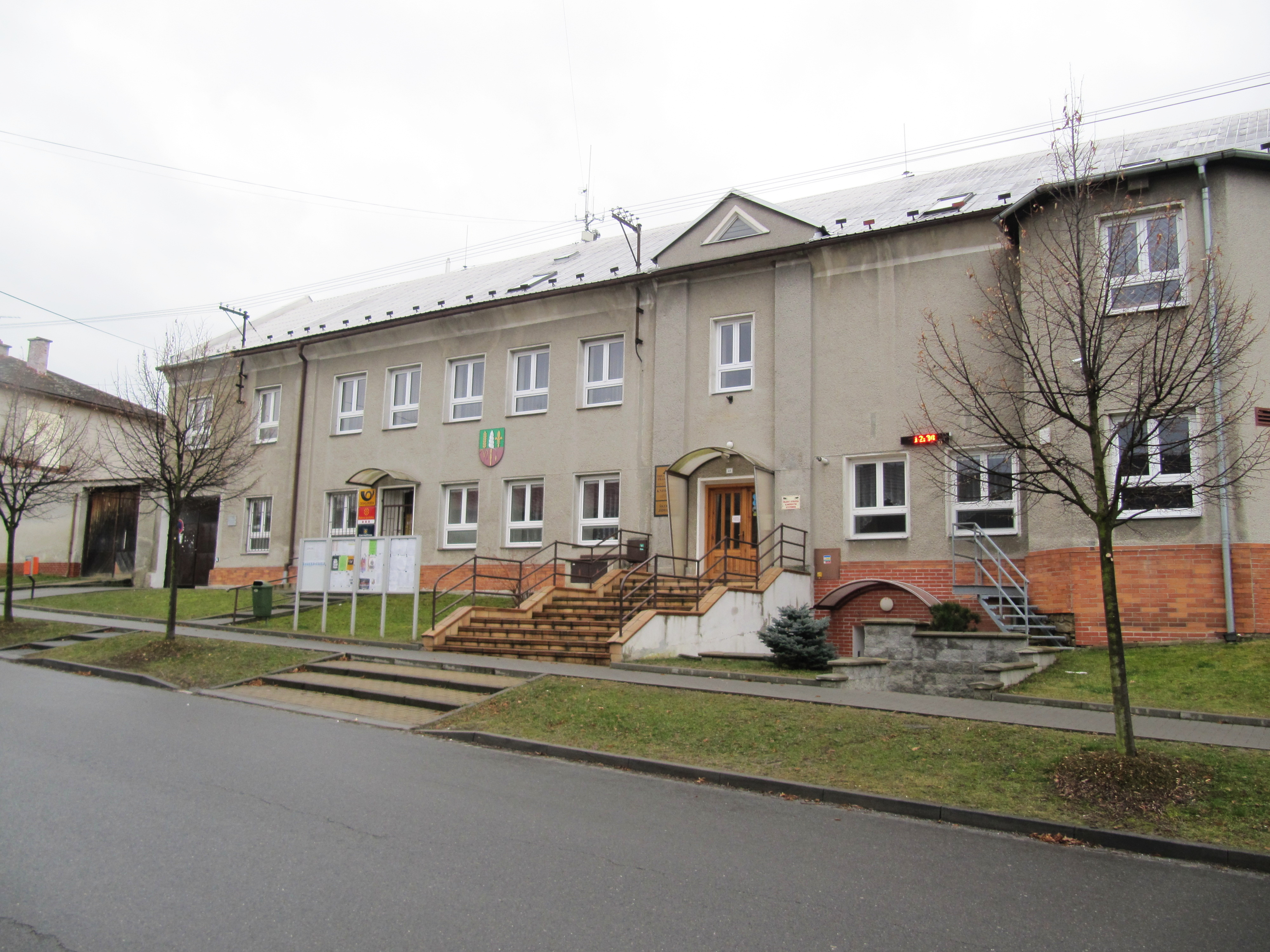
- Municipal office

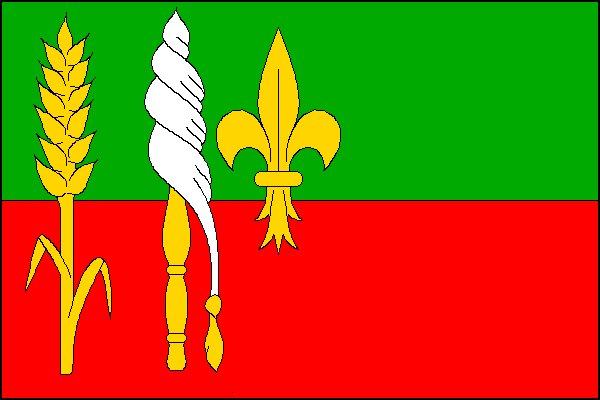
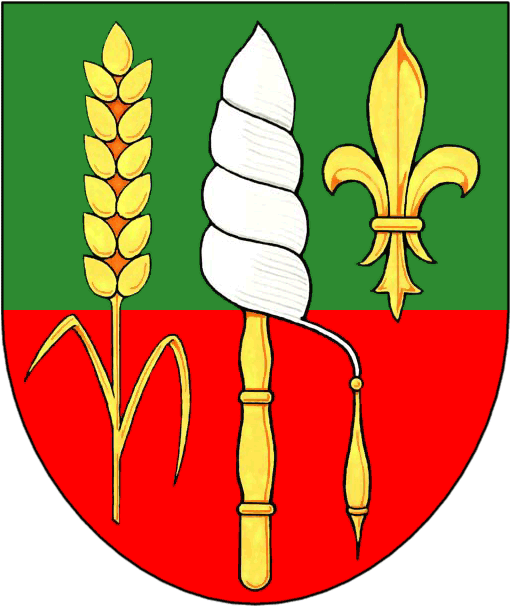
- Flag Coat of arms

- Location in the Czech Republic
- Coordinates: 49°35′15″N 17°23′26″E
- Country: Czech Republic
- Region: Olomouc
- District: Olomouc
- First mentioned: 1141

Area
  - Total: 7.28 km^{2} (2.81 sq mi)
- Elevation: 326 m (1,070 ft)

Population (2026-01-01)
  - Total: 1,473
  - Density: 202/km^{2} (524/sq mi)
- Time zone: UTC+1 (CET)
  - Summer (DST): UTC+2 (CEST)
- Postal codes: 783 54, 783 56
- Website: www.praslavice.com

Přáslavice is a municipality and village in Olomouc District in the Olomouc Region of the Czech Republic. It has about 1,500 inhabitants.

Přáslavice lies approximately 11 kilometres (7 mi) east of Olomouc and 221 km (137 mi) east of Prague.

== Administrative division ==
Přáslavice consists of two municipal parts (in brackets population according to the 2021 census):

- Přáslavice (1,388)
- Kocourovec (49)

== Demographics ==
Historical population
Year	Pop.	±%
1869	769	—
1880	873	+13.5%
1890	1,046	+19.8%
1900	1,139	+8.9%
1910	1,162	+2.0%
1921	1,139	−2.0%
1930	1,186	+4.1%
1950	1,267	+6.8%
1961	1,382	+9.1%
1970	1,358	−1.7%
1980	1,324	−2.5%
1991	1,195	−9.7%
2001	1,274	+6.6%
2011	1,362	+6.9%
2021	1,437	+5.5%
Source: Censuses
