= Hatín =

- Municipality
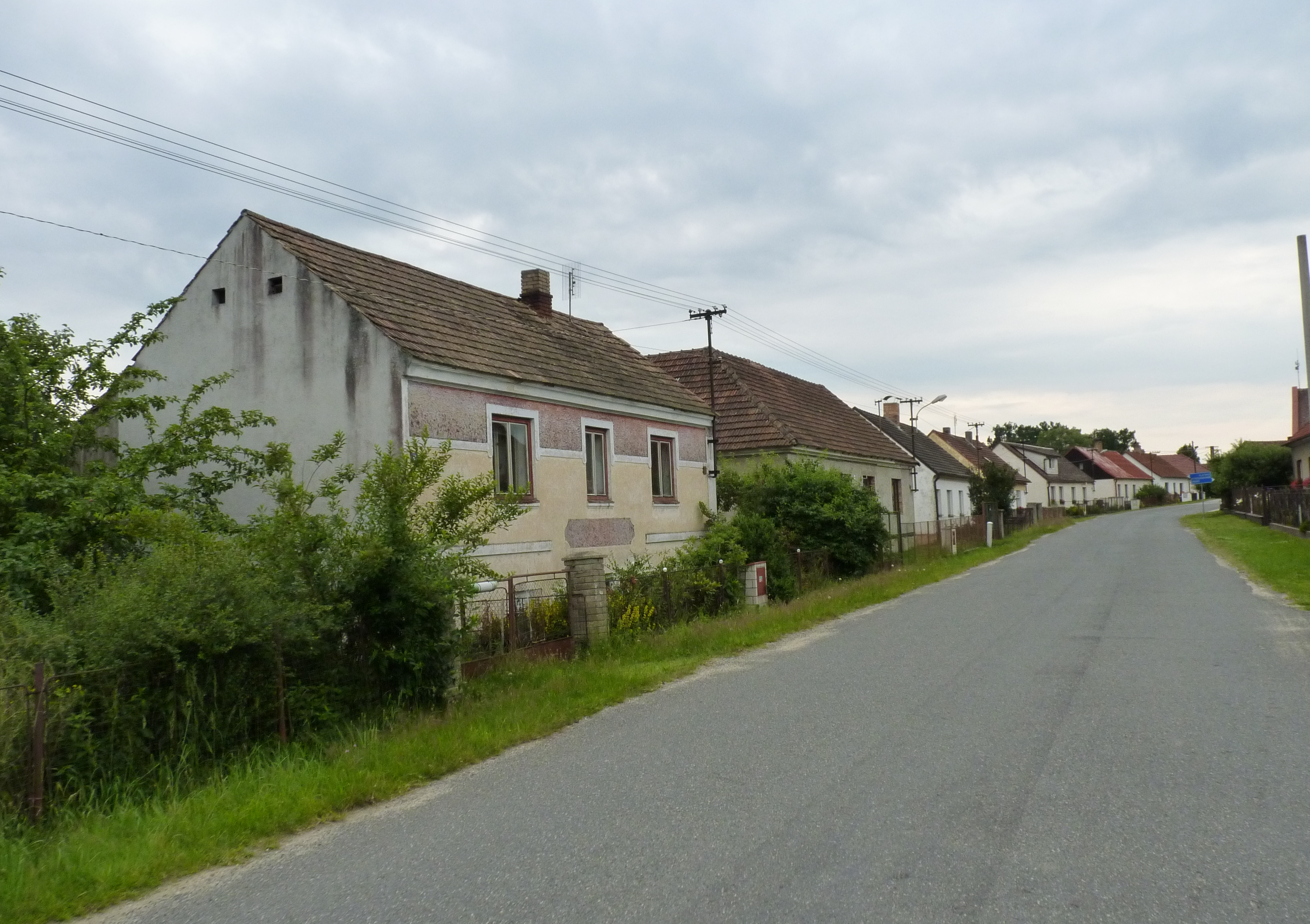
- Main street

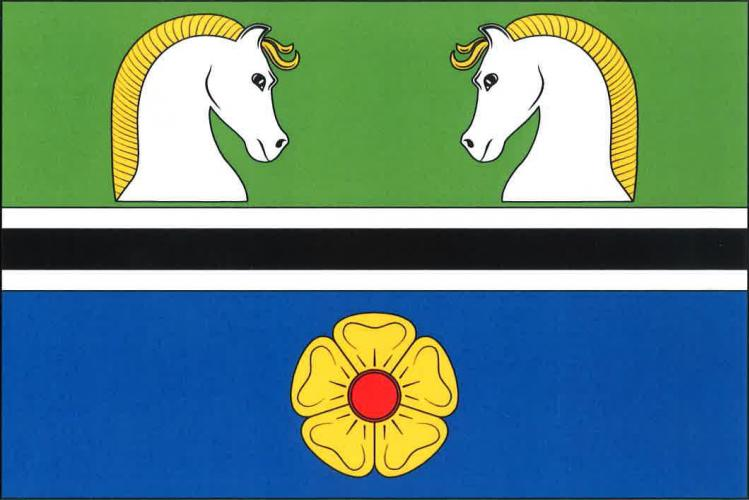
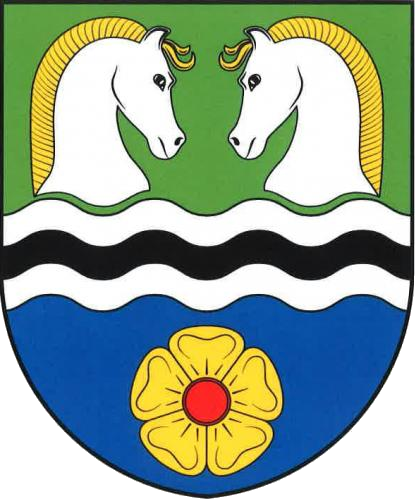
- Flag Coat of arms

- Location in the Czech Republic
- Coordinates: 49°6′31″N 14°54′40″E
- Country: Czech Republic
- Region: South Bohemian
- District: Jindřichův Hradec
- First mentioned: 1389

Area
  - Total: 29.91 km^{2} (11.55 sq mi)
- Elevation: 484 m (1,588 ft)

Population (2026-01-01)
  - Total: 258
  - Density: 8.63/km^{2} (22.3/sq mi)
- Time zone: UTC+1 (CET)
  - Summer (DST): UTC+2 (CEST)
- Postal codes: 377 01, 378 02, 379 01
- Website: www.hatin.cz

Hatín is a municipality and village in Jindřichův Hradec District in the South Bohemian Region of the Czech Republic. It has about 300 inhabitants.

== Administrative division ==
Hatín consists of three municipal parts (in brackets population according to the 2021 census):

- Hatín (136)
- Jemčina (31)
- Stajka (71)

== Etymology ==
The name is derived from the personal name Háta. Háta is a shortened form of Ahata, which is an old Czech variant of the name Agatha.

== Geography ==
Hatín is located about 7 kilometres (4 mi) southwest of Jindřichův Hradec and 34 km (21 mi) northeast of České Budějovice. Most of the municipal territory lies in the Třeboň Basin, but the eastern part with the villages of Hatín and Stajka lies in the Křemešník Highlands. The highest point is at 512 m (1,680 ft) above sea level. The area of the Třeboň Basin belongs to the Třeboňsko Protected Landscape Area. The municipal territory is rich in streams.

== History ==
The first written mention of Hatín is from 1389, when it belonged to the Jindřichův Hradec estate.

== Demographics ==
Historical population

Year	Pop.	±%
1869	499	—
1880	527	+5.6%
1890	543	+3.0%
1900	584	+7.6%
1910	608	+4.1%

Year	Pop.	±%
1921	639	+5.1%
1930	574	−10.2%
1950	433	−24.6%
1961	410	−5.3%
1970	374	−8.8%

Year	Pop.	±%
1980	287	−23.3%
1991	235	−18.1%
2001	209	−11.1%
2011	220	+5.3%
2021	238	+8.2%

Source: Censuses

== Transport ==
There are no railways or major roads passing through the municipality.

== Sights ==
The most important monument is the Jemčina Castle. It is a Baroque building with Neoclassical modifications, which served as a hunting lodge. It was built in 1757–1759 on the site of an old stud farm. The castle chapel of St. John of Nepomuk was added in 1769. Next to the castle is a park.
