= 9K52 Luna-M =

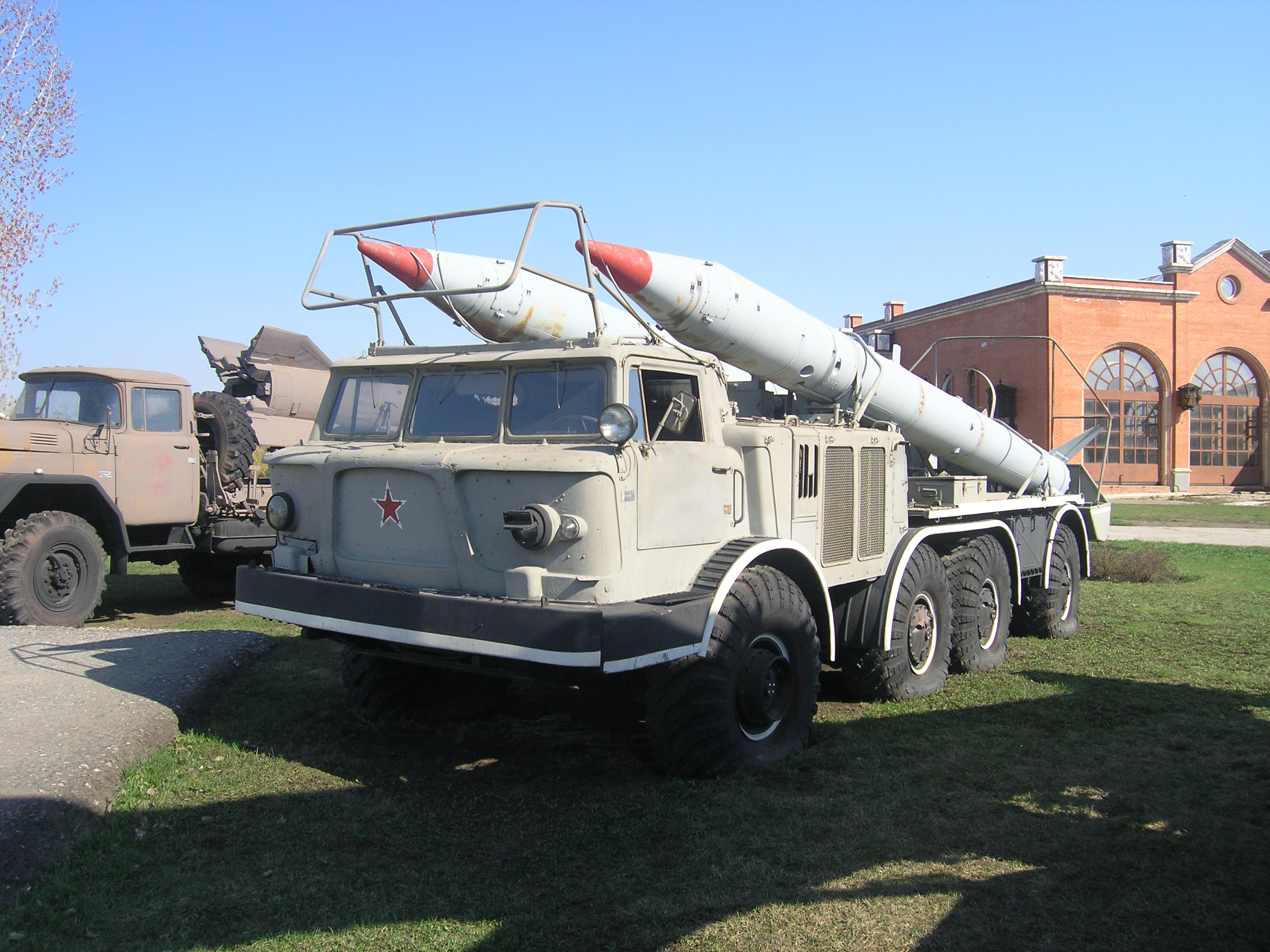
- 9T29 TEL with 9M21 rocket
- Type: Artillery rocket
- Place of origin: Soviet Union

Service history
- In service: 1962–present
- Wars: Yom Kippur War; Soviet–Afghan War; Iran–Iraq War; Lebanese Civil War; Gulf War; Yugoslav Wars; 2003 invasion of Iraq; First Libyan Civil War; Syrian Civil War; Yemeni Civil War (2014–present)

Production history
- Variants: 9M21B (nuclear), 9M21F (HE) and 9M21G (chemical), Laith-90

Specifications (9M21B)
- Mass: 2.5t
- Length: 8,950–9,400 mm (352–370 in)
- Width: 1,700 mm (67 in)
- Diameter: 544 mm (21.4 in)
- Crew: 4
- Maximum firing range: 65 km (40 mi)
- Warhead: High explosive, chemical, nuclear
- Warhead weight: 420 - 457 kg
- Maximum speed: Mach 3
- Launch platform: 8×8 ZIL-135 missile launcher

The 9K52 Luna-M (Russian: Луна, English: Moon; NATO reporting name: Frog-7) is a Soviet short-range artillery rocket system which fires unguided and spin-stabilized 9M21 rockets. It was originally developed in the 1960s to provide divisional artillery support using tactical nuclear weapons but gradually modified for conventional use. The 9K52 was succeeded by the OTR-21 Tochka.

== Description ==
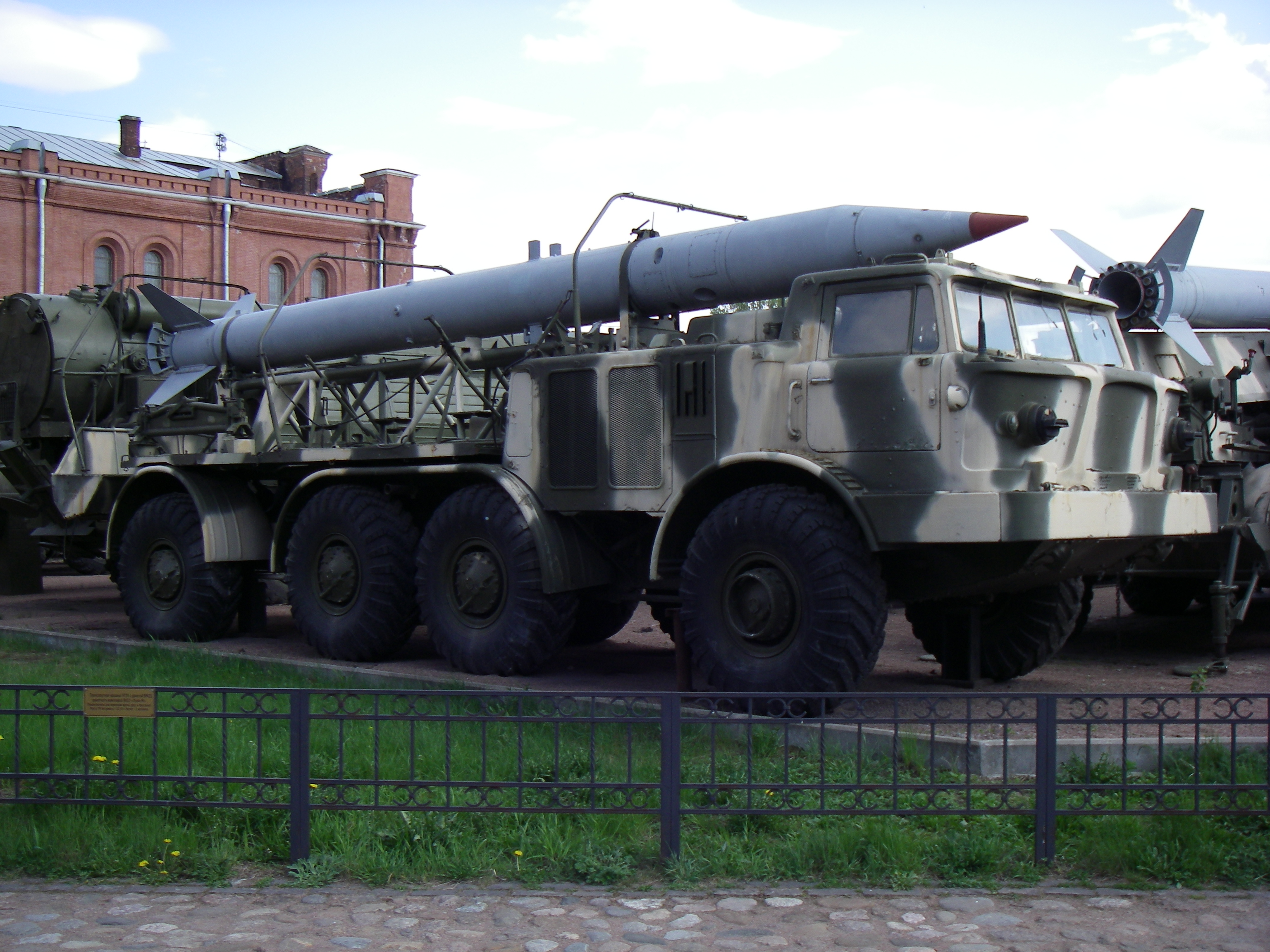
9T29 transporter with 9M21 rocket of the 9K52 "Luna-M" missile system

Originally called the 3R-11 and 9R11, the 9M21 is a solid fuel rocket, with four off-angle vernier chambers immediately behind the warhead section. When the main engine section ignites, the verniers activate to start spinning the rocket, to improve stability and accuracy. At range, the 9M21 has a nominal CEP (circular error probable) of 400 meters. Western intelligence estimated that its CEP at maximum range was 500 to 700 meters. Russian sources admit the likely impact point could fall anywhere within an area 2.8 kilometers in depth from range error, and 1.8 kilometers in width in azimuth error.

The initial 3R-11 rocket, known also by its military designation R-65 (NATO: Frog-7A), measures 8,900 mm in length. It was replaced in 1968 with an improved R-70 (NATO: Frog-7B) which measures 9,400 mm. This new variant allows for switching warhead sections and the addition of air brakes at the rear of the rocket, lowering the minimum range to 15 km (9.3 mi).

The rocket is mounted on a transporter erector launcher (TEL), designated 9P113. Based on the ZIL-135LM 8x8 truck, it features a large hydraulic crane to allow faster reloading. The 9T29 transporter, also based on the ZIL-135RTM chassis, can carry up to three 9M21 rockets.

In addition to its inaccuracy, the fact that the rocket was exposed to the weather was another drawback to the system, particularly when equipped with temperature-sensitive nuclear ordnance. In the early 1960s, the Soviets experimented with a modified 9P113 launch vehicle with a fully-enclosed superstructure and launch roof. This did not solve the issue entirely, necessitating the development of the Tochka.

== Operation ==
In Soviet service, the Luna-M was organized into battalions to provide divisions with rocket artillery support. Each battalion was organized with a headquarters battery and two firing batteries. Total complement included 20 officers, 160 enlisted personnel, four 9P113 launchers and, on average, seven rockets per launcher.

The headquarters battery numbered about 80 personnel and provided the battalion with command and logistical support. Vehicles included 4 9T29 transporter vehicles, a 9T31M1 crane vehicle (Ural-375D), an RM-1 maintenance complex (3 ZIL-157s), an RVD-1 optical maintenance vehicle (Ural-375D) and a PKPP maintenance/check vehicle (ZIL-131).

Each firing battery was organized with a headquarters, a meteorological section, a survey section, and two firing sections. The headquarters included a 9S445M command vehicle: a GAZ-66 truck with attached shelter containing fire control computer, radios and telephones. The meteorological section operated the RVS-1 Malakhit and a RMS-1 meteorological radar in the 1970s. They later upgraded to a RMS-1 End Tray radar, supported by an auxiliary power unit, each towed by a GAZ-66. The survey section used a GAZ-69TM/TMG/TMG-2, GAZ-66T or UAZ-452T for launch site preparation. Each firing section consisted of a single 9P113.

Preparing the launcher to fire could take anywhere from 15 to 30 minutes. Launch sites were generally located 20 to 25 kilometers behind the front line. It was the longest-ranged artillery system available to a division commander and typically reserved for special missions. Because the rocket's inaccuracy at long range made the use of conventional warheads insufficient, barring a large and vital target, the system was more useful deploying specialized warheads.

== History ==
In October 1962, a number of Luna missiles, and 12 compatible 2-kiloton nuclear warheads, were deployed with Soviet forces in Cuba during the missile crisis.

The Luna was later extensively deployed throughout some Warsaw Pact countries and other Soviet allies. The rocket has been widely exported, and is now in the possession of a large number of countries. North Korea may have produced a small number of the rockets domestically under the name Hwasong-3 in the 1970s.

=== Afghanistan ===
In 1985, the Soviet Army started deploying Frog-7B systems armed with high explosive and cluster warheads against villages as part of an effort to deny food supplies for the Afghan mujahideen. In 1989, it was revealed that the Soviet Union supplied the Afghan Army with Frog-7 launchers and expired Frog-7A and Frog-7B rounds from Soviet stockpiles to replace the 1,000-odd Scud-B delivered and fired against the rebel forces.

=== Syria ===
In its first use in combat, Syrian forces fired a Frog-7 barrage at Galilee on 7 October and 8 October 1973, during the Yom Kippur War. Although aimed at Israeli air bases such as Ramat David, the rockets struck several Israeli settlements. These unintended attacks on civilians gave Israel an excuse to launch a sustained air campaign inside Syria itself.

Starting in 2012, during the Syrian Civil War, the Syrian Army fired several Frog-7 rockets against areas under the control of different insurgent formations.

=== Iraq ===
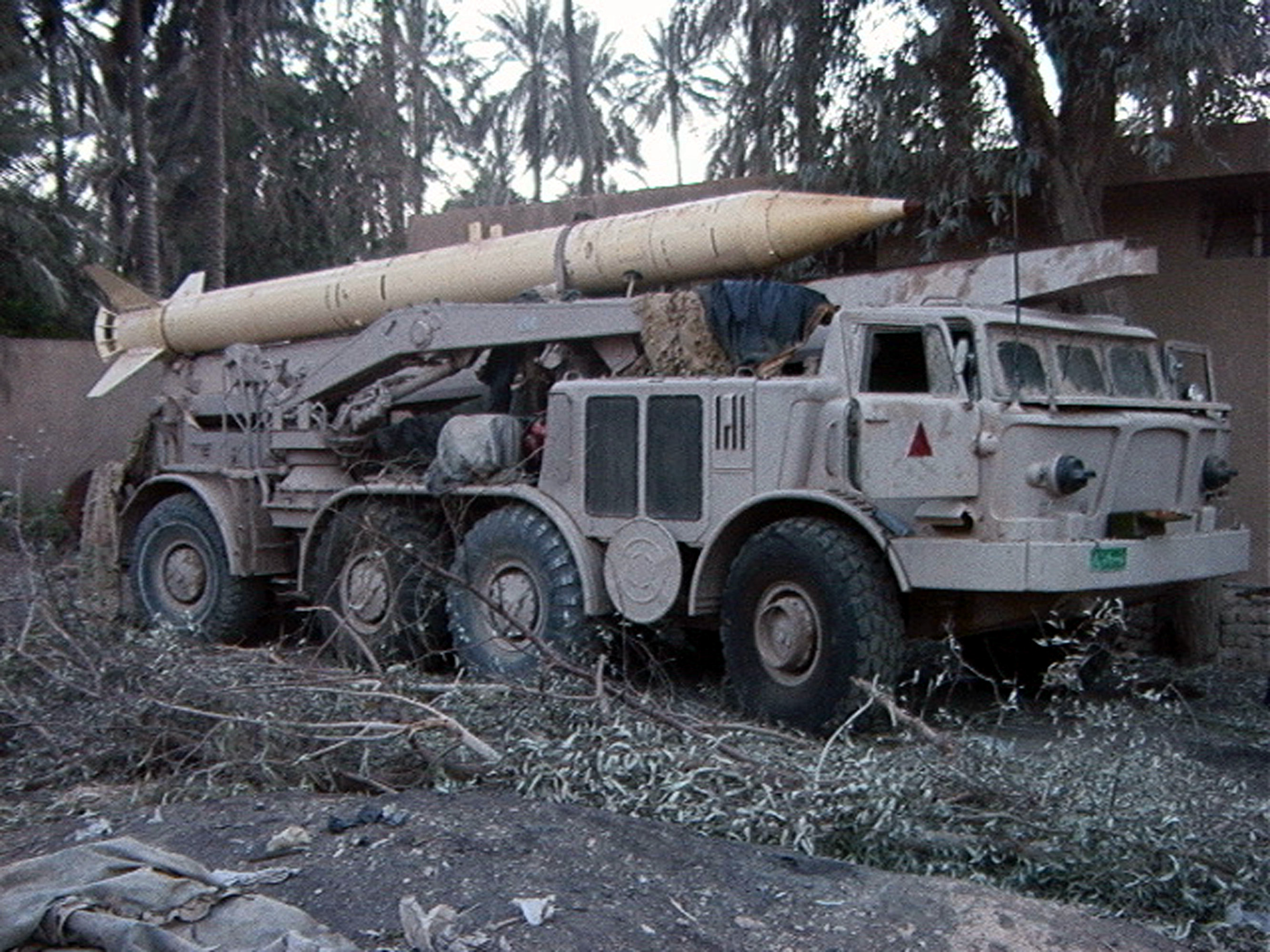
Iraqi Luna-M TEL captured in 2003

Iraq made intensive use of Frog-7 rockets in the war with Iran (1980-1988). After the war with Iran, Iraq modified its remaining stock of 9M21s by extending their range to 100 kilometres, improving their precision by installing a gyroscope, and fitting submunition-carrying warheads, under a project code-named al-Laith. On 21 February 1991, during operation Desert Storm, Senegalese troops were hit hard by a Laith-90. Eight Senegalese soldiers were wounded in action and one vehicle disabled as a result

During the 2003 invasion of Iraq, the Headquarters of the 2nd Brigade, US 3rd Infantry Division, Tactical Operations Center (TOC) of U.S Col. David Perkins, was targeted and struck by either an Iraqi Frog-7 rocket or an Ababil-100 SSM missile, killing three soldiers and two embedded journalists. Another 14 soldiers were injured, and 22 vehicles destroyed or seriously damaged, most of them Humvees.

=== Yugoslavia ===
In the Yugoslav Wars, Serb forces launched Frog-7 rockets on a number of Croatian settlements and facilities, like Orašje, a Croatian military stronghold, on the outskirts of Zupanja, on 2 December 1992, where several civilians were killed, and the military airport of Zagreb, on 11 September 1993, while the battle of Medak Pocket was still going on.

Between April and October 1992, Bosnian Serb forces fired 14 Frog-7 rockets at the Croatian city of Slavonski Brod, during Operation Corridor 92.

=== Libya ===
RAF jets targeted and destroyed Frog-7 launchers operated by pro-Gaddafi forces south of Sirte, in the 2011 Libyan civil war.

== Variants ==
9M21B
Nuclear-armed variant, fitted with one of three warheads. The original AA-22 has a variable yield of 3, 10 and 20 kilotons. The AA-38 is an improved version with the same three settings. The AA-52 has four yields of 5, 10, 20 and 200 kilotons.
9M21E
Cluster munition variant fitted with a 9N18E dispenser warhead carrying shaped charge dual-purpose submunitions.
9M21F
Standard variant fitted with a 9N18F high explosive/fragmentation warhead.
9M21Kh
Chemical weapon variant, the 436kg 9N18kh warhead is fitted with a VT fuze and carries 216kg of VX nerve agent.
Laith (also Laith-90)
Iraqi version with increased range (100 km), improved accuracy and submunition warhead suitable for attacking troop concentrations.
Ra'ad
Iraqi version with increased range (100 km), improved accuracy and submunition warhead suitable for attacking vehicle or infantry columns.
Fateh
Iraqi version with range increased to 150 km, improved accuracy and submunition warhead.
PV-65
Training rocket.

== Operators ==
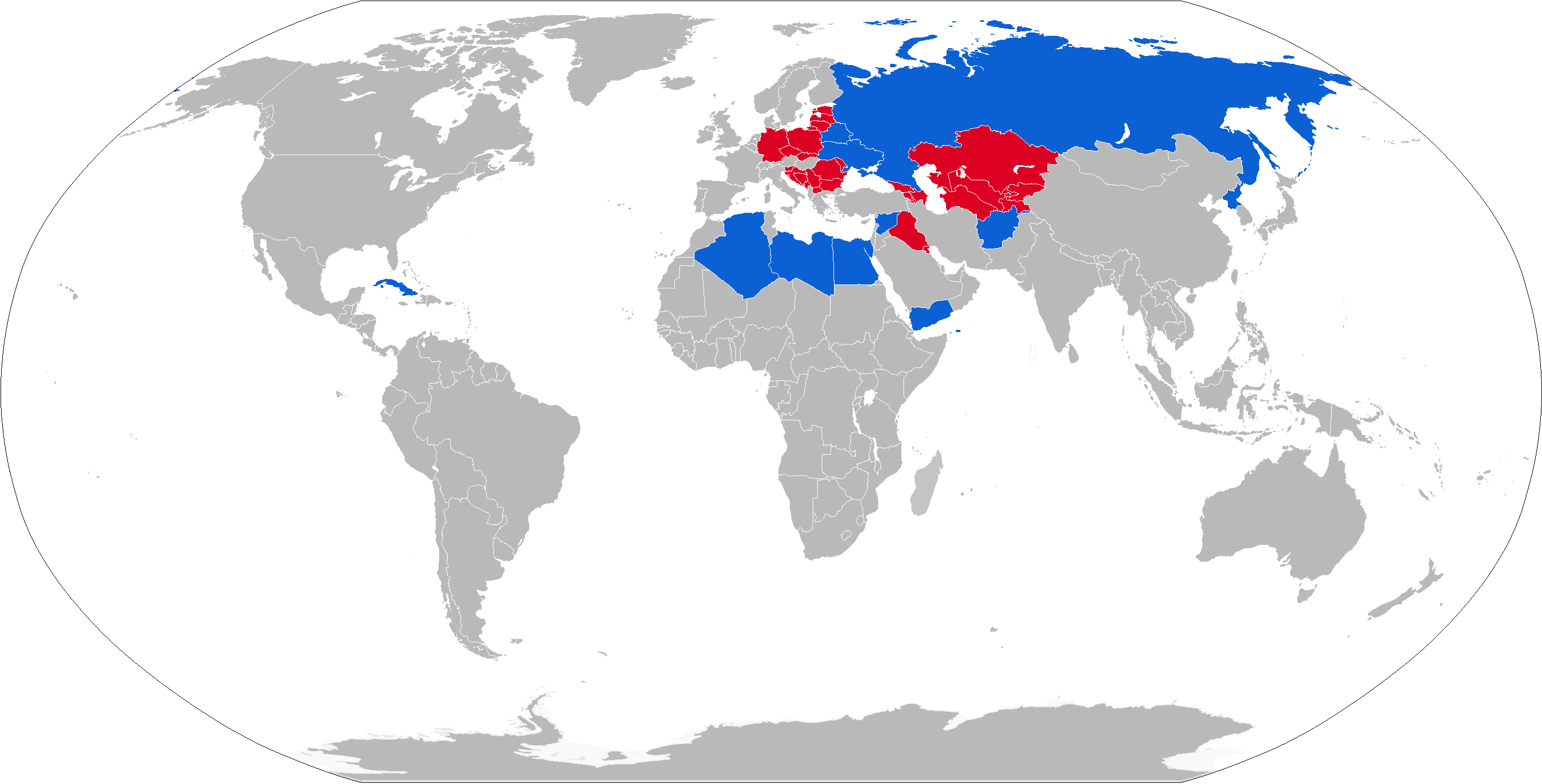
A map of 9K52 operators in blue, with former operators in red

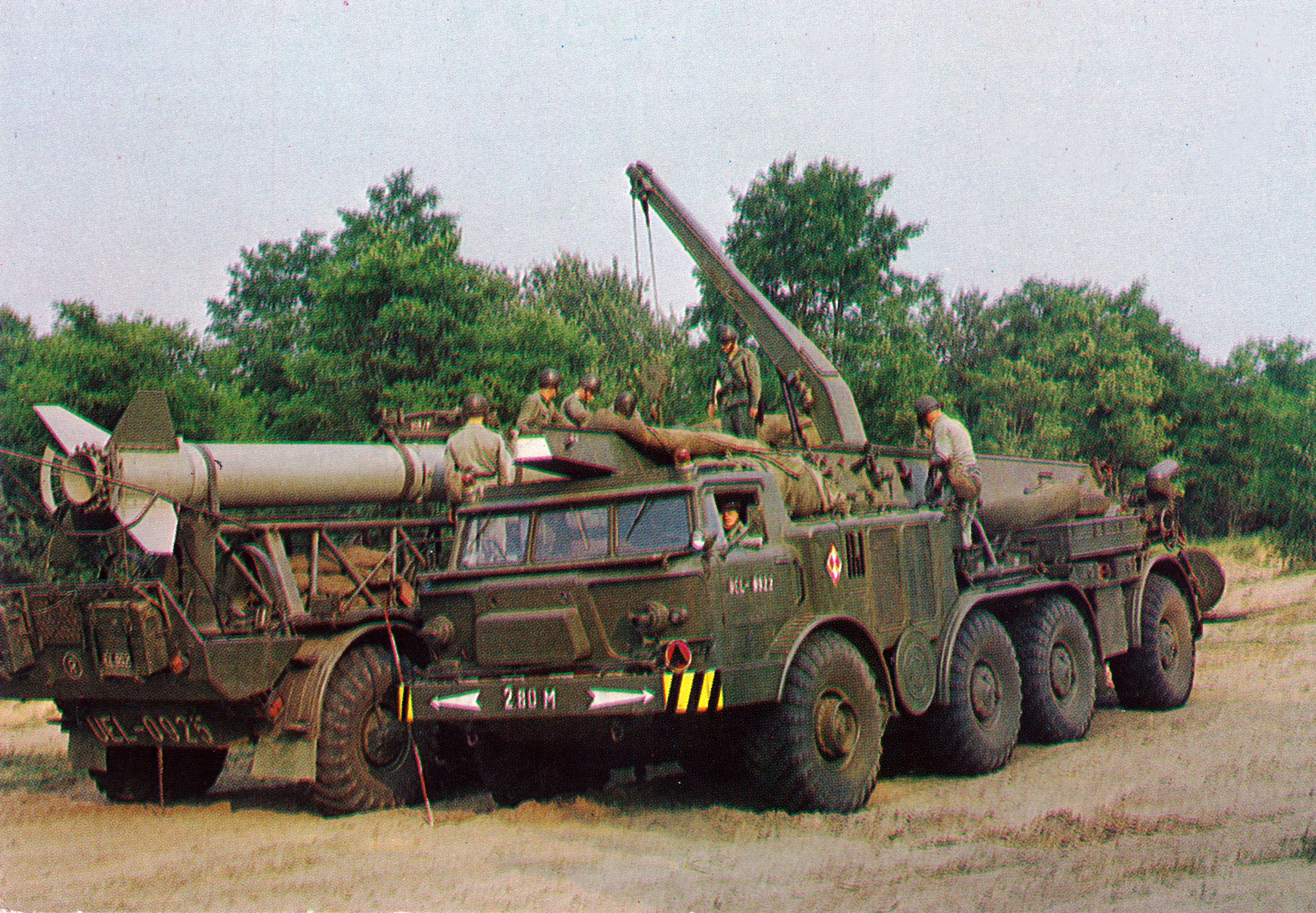
Reloading of a Polish Luna-M TEL

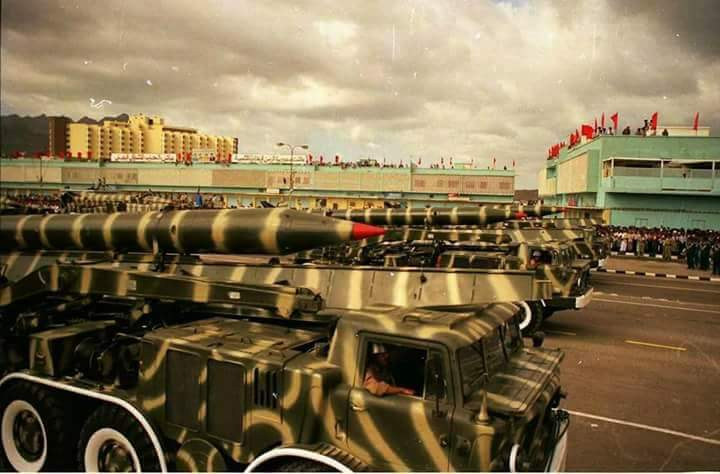
South Yemeni Luna-M launchers

=== Current ===
- Egypt − 9 as of 2024
- North Korea − 24 Frog-3, Frog-5, and Frog-7 as of 2024

=== Former ===
- Afghanistan − Frog-7A and Frog-7B
- Algeria
- Belarus − 36 in 2011
- Bulgaria
- Cuba − Between 65 and 70 launchers
- Czechoslovakia − 36 in 1990
- East Germany
- Hungary − 18 in 1990
- Iraq – entered service in 1975
- Kuwait – bought in 1977. Captured by the Iraqi Army during the Gulf War
- Lebanese Forces − 2 launchers
- Libya − 40 in 2011
- Poland – 49 launchers, operated between 1966 and 2001
- Romania – operated between 1982 and 1998
- Russia − Kept in reserve storage as late as of 2011
- South Yemen – 12 launchers bought from the Soviet Union in 1979
- Syria − 18 in 2011
- Soviet Union
- Ukraine − 50 in 2011
- Yemen − 12 in 2011
- Yugoslavia − 8 in 1990
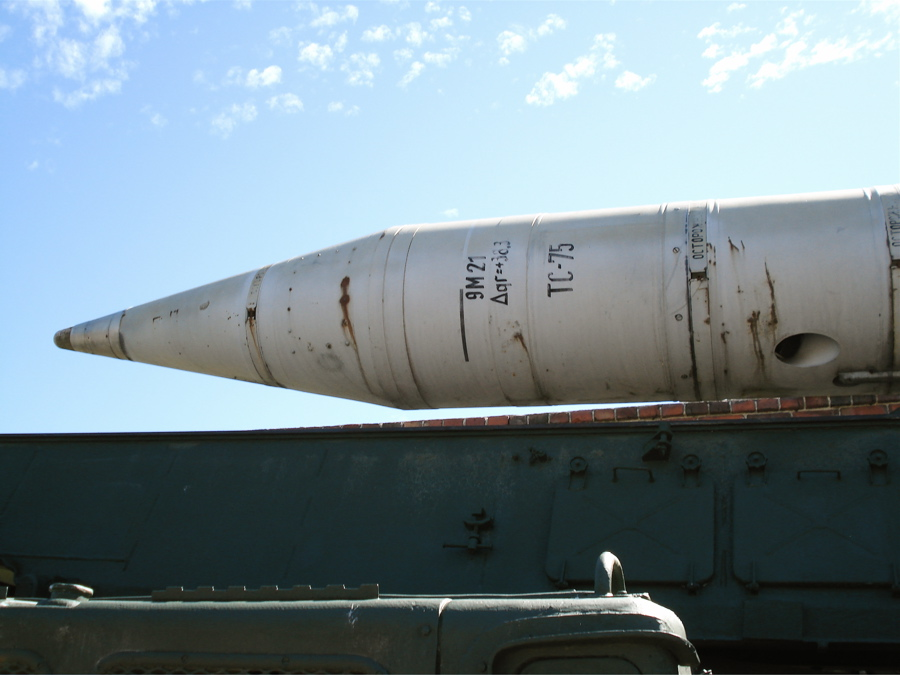
A 9M21 missile (Luna M)

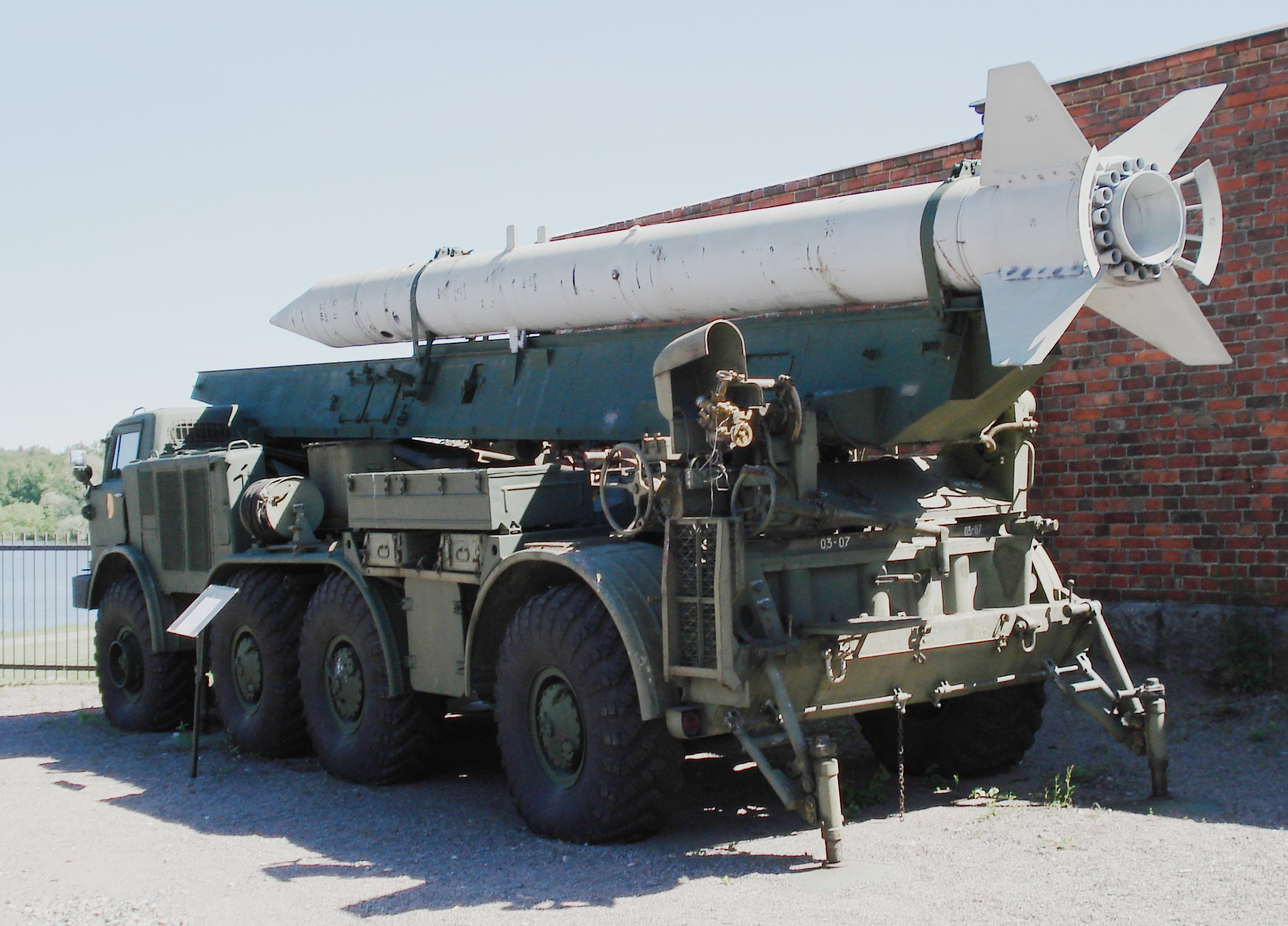
An East German 9P113 TEL

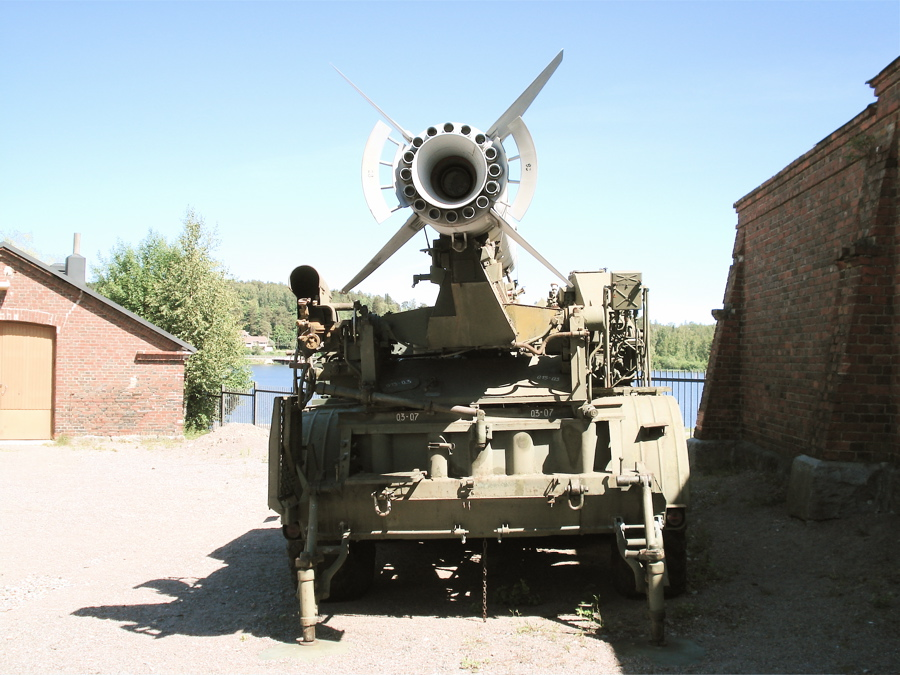
A 9P113 TEL of the 9K52 system

== See also ==
- Fajr-5
- Falaq-2
- T-122 Sakarya
- TOROS

== Bibliography ==
- Foss, Christopher F, ed. (1990). Jane's Armour and Artillery 1990-91 (11th ed.). Surrey: Jane's Defence Data. ISBN 978-0710609090.
- Foss, Christopher F, ed. (2011). Jane's Armour and Artillery 2011–2012 (32nd ed.). Surrey: Janes Information Group. ISBN 978-0-71062-960-9.
- International Institute for Strategic Studies (2024). The Military Balance 2024. Taylor & Francis. ISBN 978-1-040-05115-3.
