= Parcel locker =

Self-service collection service for parcels

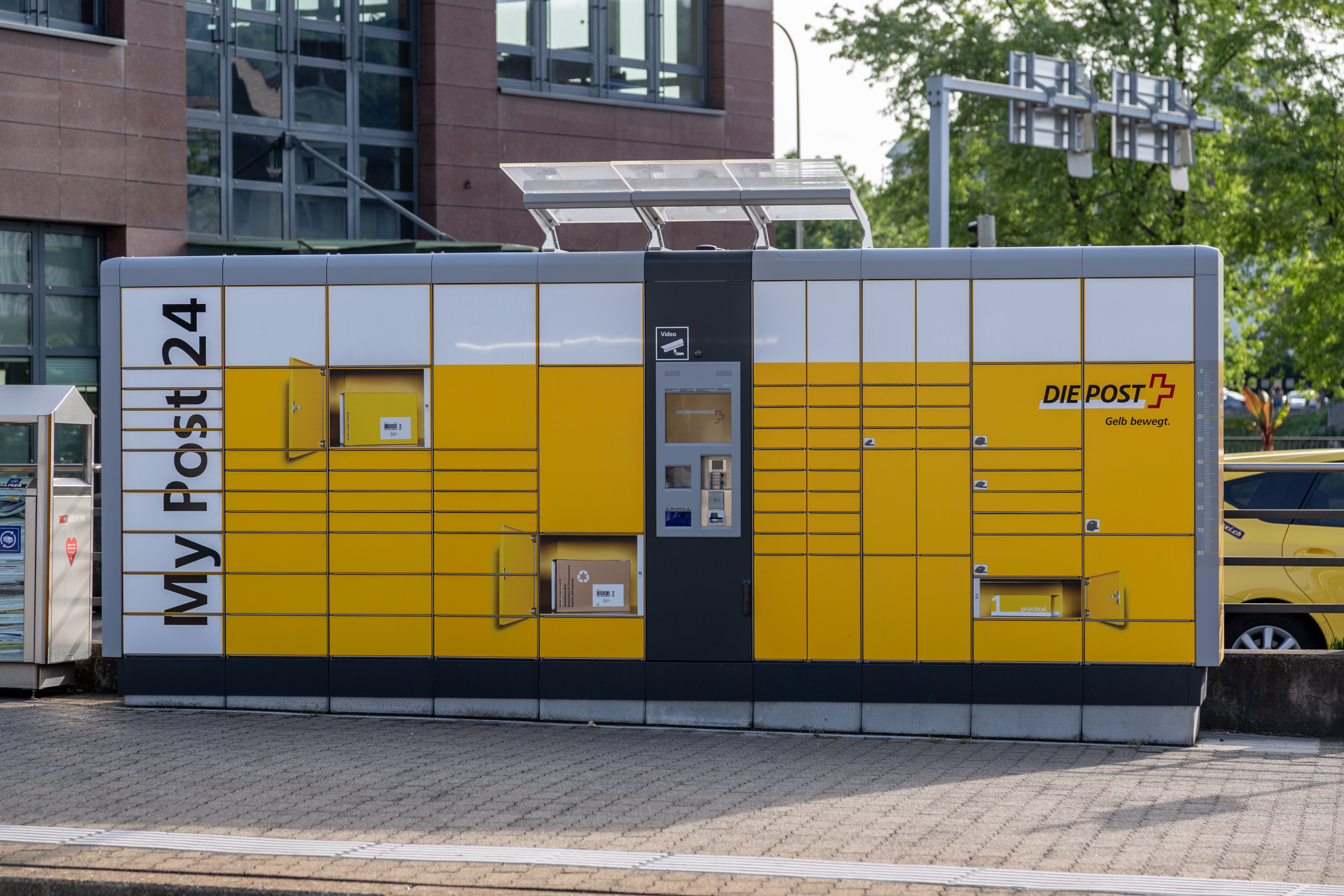
A parcel locker in Switzerland

A parcel locker, also known as an automated locker, smart locker, smart/intelligent box, delivery box, and (shared) reception box is an automated postal box that allows users for a self-service collection of parcels and oversize letters as well as the dispatch of parcels.

PLs are fixed self-collection points without staff, equipped with smart locks, conveniently located, and accessible 24/7 for easy self-collection. It typically includes several sections, each intended for one user to receive a single delivery. Once the packages reach the PLs, users receive a notification via text message containing a pickup code. Afterwards, they have the option to retrieve the packages using the code whenever it suits them. Therefore, the impact of failed deliveries is mostly reduced.

== History ==
The modern automated parcel locker was born out of a partnership formed in 2000 between the German postal operator, Deutsche Post, and the Austrian automation firm, KEBA. In the late 1990s, as early e-commerce began to rise, Deutsche Post was searching for a sustainable way to handle growing package volumes and reduce expensive, failed home delivery attempts. They approached KEBA, a company that already possessed specialized, global expertise in automating bank safe deposit boxes. Merging KEBA’s security hardware with Deutsche Post’s logistics framework, the two companies developed the world’s first automated electronic parcel locker, building the prototype in a small workshop in Linz, Austria. In late 2001, Deutsche Post launched the system as a pilot project in Dortmund and Mainz under the brand name "Packstation." Operating under KEBA's "KePol" manufacturing line, this milestone laid the structural foundation for the global smart locker industry that followed.

== Amazon Locker ==
Amazon Locker
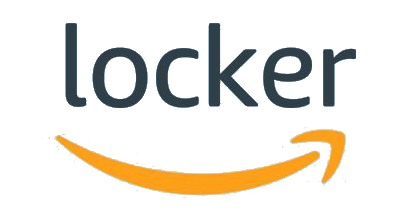

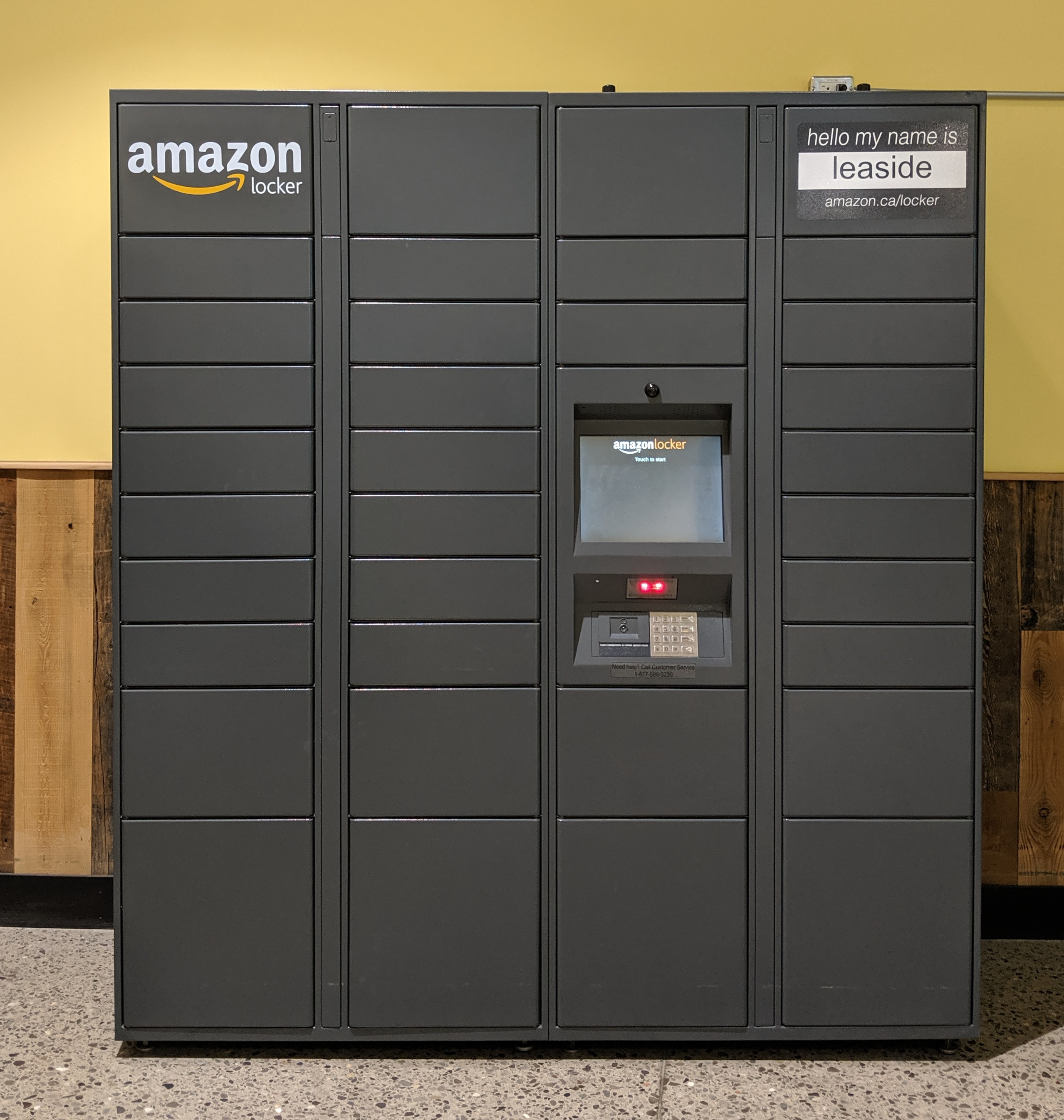
- An Amazon Locker kiosk in Toronto
- Type: Division
- Areas served: Canada, France, Germany, Italy, United Kingdom, United States, Spain, Japan, Australia, Mexico, United Arab Emirates, Austria
- Parent: Amazon
- Website: amazon.com/locker

Amazon Locker is a self-service package delivery service of parcel lockers offered by online retailer Amazon. Amazon customers can select any Locker location as their delivery address and retrieve their orders at that location by entering a unique pick-up code on the Locker touch screen. However, certain third-party sellers on Amazon may not be able to ship to an Amazon Locker, due to their use of other shipping services such as FedEx or UPS that require a signature. There are several sizes, but when ordering, amazon.com reports some parcels are too big to be delivered to a locker.

The Amazon Locker program was launched in September 2011 in New York City, Seattle, and London. As of June 2018, Lockers were available in over 2,800 locations in 70+ cities.

=== Operation ===
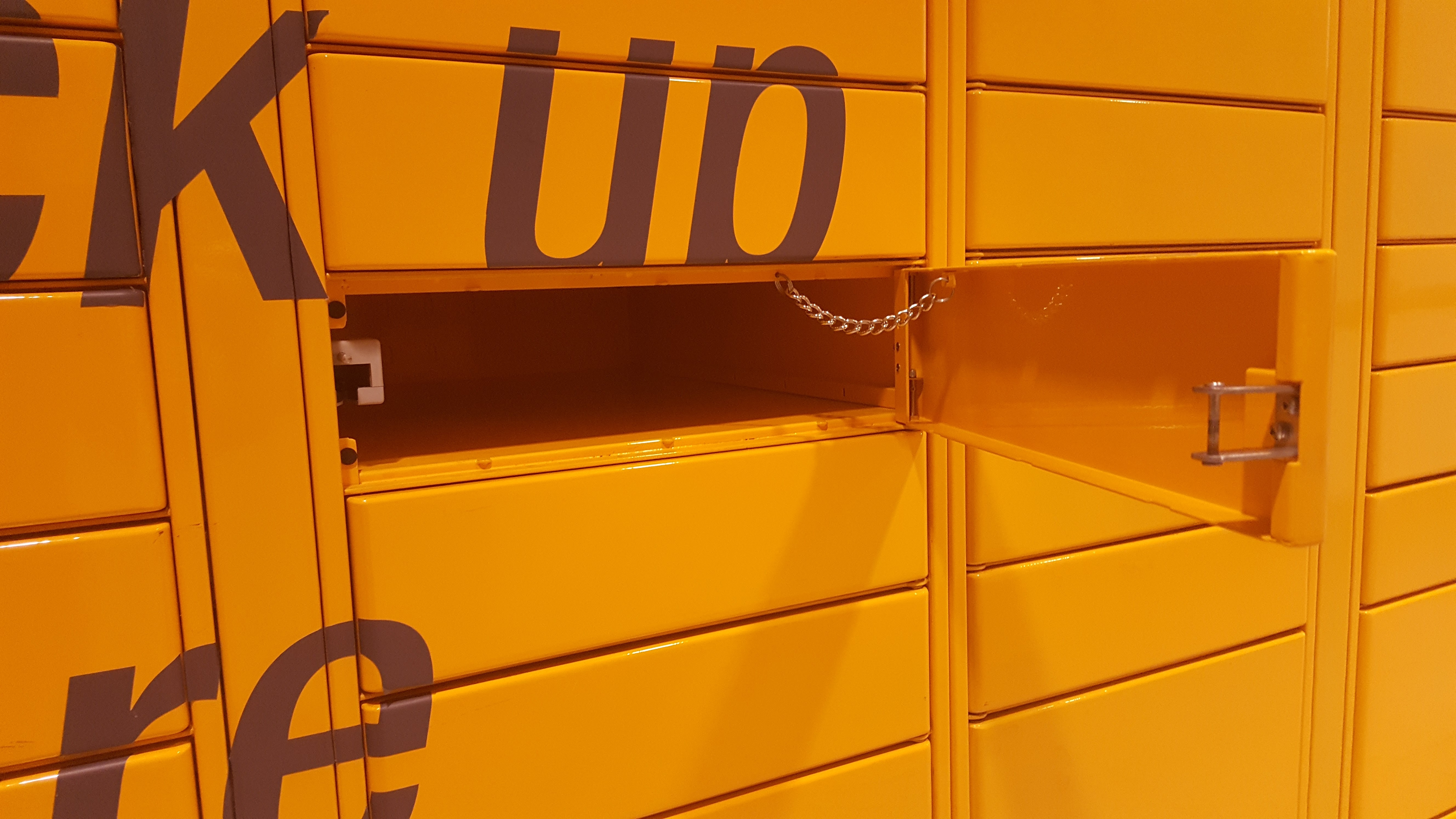
An Amazon Locker with the door open

A customer orders a parcel from Amazon and has it delivered to a Locker location. Amazon's preferred carriers deliver to the locker, and the customer receives a digital pick-up code via email or text messaging. Once the unique pick-up code is entered into the locker's touch screen, the assigned door opens for package retrieval. Amazon customers have three days to collect their packages once they receive their pick-up code.

Amazon customers can also return packages to select Amazon Lockers. Amazon Lockers can sometimes be full and therefore not available when a delivery is attempted. In that case customers will have to wait an unspecified amount of time until space is available.

=== Locker locations ===
Amazon partners with retail stores such as 7-Eleven and Spar to host Amazon Locker kiosks. Retailers receive a stipend from Amazon to host the kiosks. Staples and RadioShack joined the program briefly in 2012, only to withdraw the following year.

7-Eleven has kiosks in 186 locations in the US as of 2015.

In the United Kingdom, Amazon has a partnership with Co-op Food and Morrisons. Lockers are located within some Co-op and Morrisons stores. Since 2012, libraries in West Sussex have also been operating Lockers. Large retail centres often have Amazon Lockers, for example there are two in One New Change in London, and there is one in Stratford Centre. The largest Amazon Locker in the world and the busiest in the UK is called Ivory. It has 115 lockers and is located near the Rootes building at the University of Warwick.

Amazon has also expanded the Locker program in Canada, France, Spain, Germany and Italy.

In 2017, Amazon announced plans to launch Amazon Locker in select Whole Foods Market locations.

=== Amazon Hub ===
Amazon Hub is a delivery locker for apartment lobbies. The delivery locker accepts packages from all carriers. Amazon Hub was in beta from 2017 until June 2018, when Amazon announced that its Hub program would be available to all property management companies throughout the United States.

As of 2020, Amazon was using "Amazon Hub Locker+" to refer to a staffed version of Amazon Lockers, which allowed for customers to pick up large packages, and for customers to return items without a box.

== Pharmaceutical lockers ==
Several manufacturers offer parcel lockers designed for pickup of drugs, either at pharmacies or in remote locations. One design as an integrated audio-visual connection for conferring with a pharmacist. Drug pickup lockers are deployed at some Costco pharmacies and have been piloted at CVS Health. A shortage of pharmacists in the 2020s increased pressure to adopt this solution. Though delivery of prescription drugs by mail is common, some jurisdictions (for example the U.S. state of Georgia) have laws which do not allow the use of unattended lockers.

== Systems around the world ==
=== Asia ===
Yamato Transport, Amazon Japan, Japan Post Holdings, Sagawa Express, and DHL Japan have deployed parcel-locker networks in Japan. Yamato Transport had approximately 4,300 locker locations in major cities by June 2019. In 2016, unsuccessful home deliveries accounted for approximately 20% of Yamato Transport's deliveries, prompting the company to expand parcel-locker services.

In Thailand, WashBox24 has launched smart cabinets in 2013 and now has about 100 smart lockers in 2017 and planned to cooperate with Thai Post to increase the number of smart lockers to 3000. InPost had launched the parcel locker solution in Malaysia since 2015, with 30 lockers in Klang Valley. The Infocomm Media Development Authority (IMDA) launched the first successful trial in 2018 then worked with 18 companies to deploy 62 locker stations and delivery around 200000 parcels daily in Singapore.

Cainiao Station and Hive Box, two nationwide last-mile delivery service providers in China. Hive box only, among other competitors, operates more than 150 thousand parcel lockers with 12 million boxes in communities/business-buildings/schools/ government-units, located in more than 100 cities, and delivers more than 9 million parcels per day. Besides that, Cainiao network by Alibaba group has established more than 30,000 community-based SPLs and more than 1900 college-based SPLs to date, covering more than 280 cities across China. It was predicted that SPLs would develop further and play a more prominent role in the provision of services. A survey by Youth News (2021) reveals that 83.7% of urban customers in China are dissatisfied with the current urban last-mile delivery system where most parcels are delivered to parcel lockers.

==== Bangladesh ====
In Bangladesh, a partnership between ekpay of A2I and Daraz created ekShop-Digibox Parcel locker. The manufacturing of the solution was done completely within Bangladesh and said to be much cheaper than western or Chinese solutions. The lockers were situated at the metro stations for ease of access.

==== Australia and Oceania ====
Australia Post offers a similar service with facilities located in or near various post offices. In 2014, Australia Post started to launch a parcel locker system together with MyPost Deliveries. In May 2020, Australia Post and their partnership, InPost, had over 400 parcel locker stations.

==== United Arab Emirates ====
A courier company called Parzel Express introduced automated delivery machines in United Arab Emirates in 2011 manufactured by KEBA.

=== Europe ===
==== Germany ====
Packstation is a service of parcel lockers run by DHL Parcel Germany, a business unit of Deutsche Post's Mail division, in Germany and elsewhere (e.g. in Italy). It provides automated booths for a self-service collection of parcels and oversize letters as well as self-service dispatch of parcels 24 hours a day, seven days a week. Packstation started as a pilot project in 2001 and was quickly expanded. In 2025 there were more than 15,500 Packstation machines in Germany and 90 percent of the people living in Germany were within ten minutes of a DHL Packstation. Only ordinary parcels and letters delivered by Deutsche Post can be delivered to Packstations. Moreover, Deutsche Post allows its subsidiary DHL Express Germany to insert a limited number of express parcels. Packstations were originally manufactured by the Austrian company KEBA with newer stations developed by DHL Paket in conjunction with Polygon.

A major market for Packstation is the increasing number of single people, especially students and time-poor professionals, who purchase products online but are not normally at home at daytime to accept deliveries, or who do not have the time to deposit parcels at the post office during normal opening hours. As of September 2023 there were over 23 million registered Packstation customers in Germany according to Deutsche Post.

Using Packstations is free of charge both for private and business customers; however, prior registration through the web portal Paket.de is required for collection of parcels.

Each customer obtains a magnetic stripe card ("Goldcard") and PIN that can be used to identify the customer at Packstation machines and post offices. Previously, it was possible to use the Packstation by entering the customer number and the PIN. This was changed in 2011 in order to increase security as said by DHL, usage of the Goldcard was mandatory afterwards. On 29 October 2012, a mandatory mTAN was introduced, this is transmitted solely in the SMS notification or can be retrieved from the DHL Paket App. Each mTAN is valid only for one opening procedure (which may entitle to open several booths if the recipient has received numerous shipments), thereby replacing the PIN. Newer Packsations can communicate with the user's mobile phone via Bluetooth if the DHL App is available on the phone. A PIN or TAN is then no longer necessary.

==== Austria ====
Austria's Österreichische Post introduced a virtually identical service called Post.24-Station in November 2006. The booths are manufactured by the same company that makes the packstations, KEBA. In Vienna, Stations have been erected in supermarkets, petrol stations, and post offices that can easily be reached by public transport.

==== Ireland ====
In the Republic of Ireland, ParcelMotel is owned by the Nightline courier company. ParcelMotel has operated since 2012 and had 124 locations providing over 10,000 locker spaces throughout the Republic of Ireland. All locations were closed on January 31, 2023. ParcelMotel also offered a UK address for parcel delivery which allowed customers in Ireland to take advantage of free UK delivery. They also offered free/business paid return services, motel-to-motel delivery at special rates and a parcel sending service.

==== Finland ====
A company called SmartPOST, run by the Finnish Posti Group runs a network of self-service parcel terminals in Finland, Estonia, Latvia and Lithuania. The terminals are located in shopping centres and other public premises. They enable clients to send and receive parcels and pay for them at the collection point. There is a terminal for every Estonian in a range of a 15-minute drive. The parcel terminals were introduced to Finland in 2011. The parcel terminals and the software running the system are manufactured in Estonia by Cleveron.

==== Turkey ====
Turkey's national post, the PTT, has been installing domestically produced Kargomat lockers since 2019.

==== Latvia ====
Latvian company, PostService, runs a network of 39 self-service parcel terminals in Latvia, called Mana pasta stacija (English: My Post Station). Terminals are located in 27 cities and towns in Latvia. The terminals are constructed and manufactured in Latvia by PostService itself.

==== Baltic ====
As of 2022, in Baltics parcel locker services by Venipak, Omniva, DPD, Unisend and Latvijas Pasts are operating.

==== Poland ====
Polish company InPost runs a network of almost 29,000 self-service parcel terminals in Poland called Paczkomaty, with them placing their first one in 2009. Terminals are located in shopping centres, car parks and gas stations. The terminals enable clients to send and receive parcels. As of 2025, there are almost 54,000 parcel terminals across the entire country, with the previously mentioned InPost controlling almost half of them, with DPD Polska being in second with around 9,000 and Orlen in third with around 6,000 parcel terminals, making Poland the country with the highest density of parcel terminals per capita.

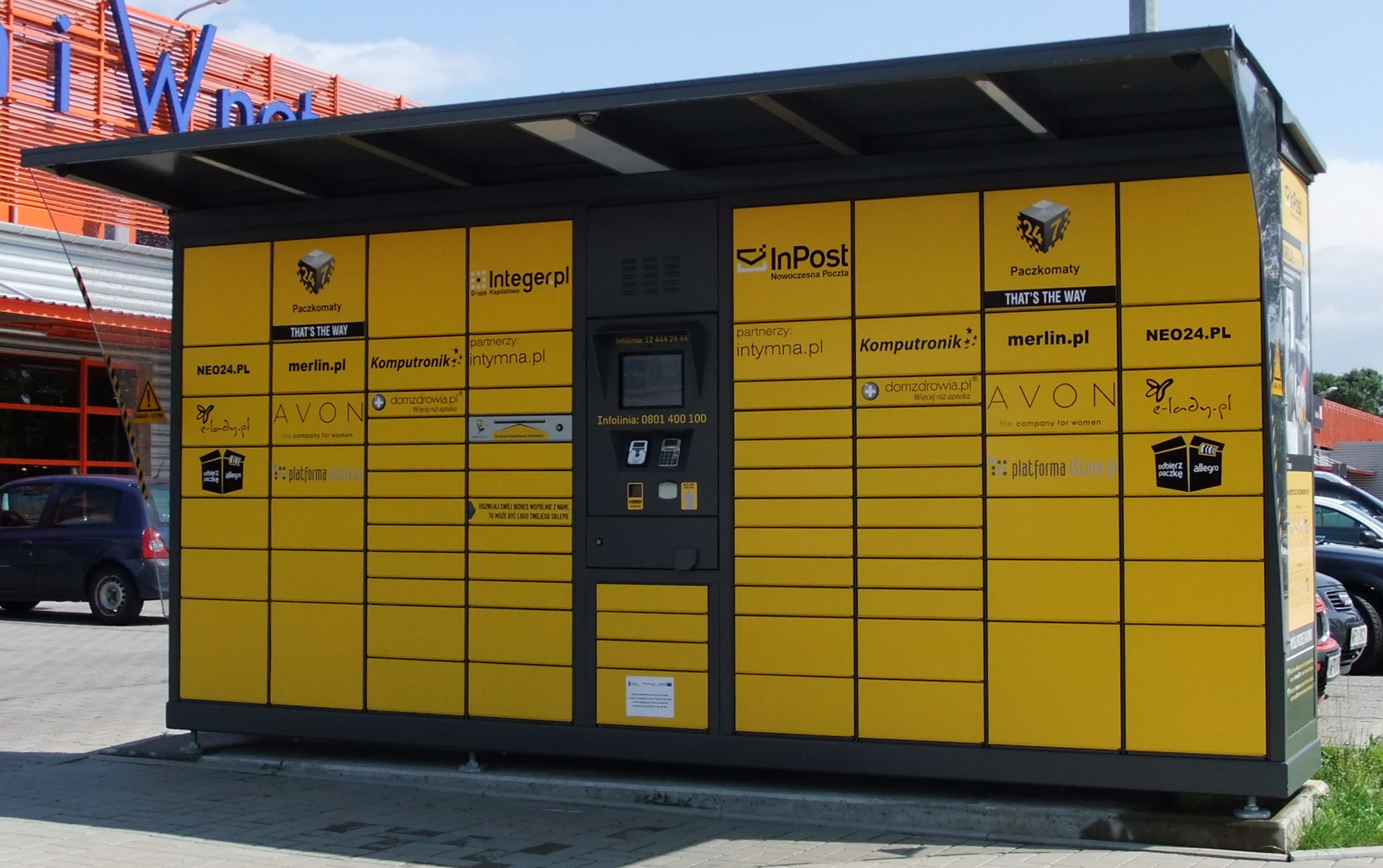
An InPost Automated Parcel Machine (known in Poland as a Paczkomat)

==== United Kingdom ====
In the United Kingdom, InPost operate lockers, which are found in various locations including fuel station, railway stations, forecourts and supermarkets. According to the company, they are "strategically located in urban areas where people work, shop and play".

==== Russia ====
In Russia, parcel lockers have gained considerable popularity, with several major companies offering the service, including Logibox, PickPoint, QIWI Post, EMS Russian Post, Yandex Market, and Russian Post.

==== Romania ====
In Romania, parcel lockers are very popular, however the most used are Sameday's easybox and Fan Courier's FANbox.

==== Slovakia ====
In Slovakia, there are multiple networks of package lockers. Slovenská pošta has a network of BalíkoBOX lockers, Packeta and GLS lockers of their own, and multiple delivery companies can deliver to Alza.sk’s lockers as well.

==== France ====
In France, Parcel Lockers are gaining popularity with main players in the market being: InPost, Amazon and Vinted.

Vinted Go (logistics service of Vinted) was launched in France in July 2022 and will place more than 13,000 Parcel Lockers across the country, creating the largest network in France and one of the largest in the world. The Lockers are manufactured by the Portuguese company Bloq.it, and are placed across nation-wide retail chains such as Franprix, Carrefour, and CASINO stores.

=== Americas ===
A Canadian parcel locker company, BufferBox, was established in 2011. It was acquired by Google in November 2012, and its service has since been suspended.

Amazon Lockers are a similar service specific to deliveries fulfilled through online retailer Amazon.

The United States Postal Service announced a similar service called "gopost", announced in 2011 and with permanent locker installation starting in August 2014 at 17 locations in New York City and Washington, D.C.

Correos de Costa Rica offers a similar service with automated delivery machines located in various supermarkets. The test program started in July 2017. The machines are manufactured in Costa Rica. In 2018, the operation of the smart locker system known as API was started. The Api lockers are manufactured by Correos de Costa Rica itself. The network has 102 locations throughout Costa Ríca. With further expansion in the near future.

When the pandemic arrived in early 2020, retailers scrambled to find ways to meet consumer demand for their products while simultaneously managing last-mile delivery costs, overall margins, and maintaining contactless solutions. Parcel lockers began to fill this need by using technology to reduce logistics costs and provide a frictionless, and contactless option for customers.

== Gallery ==
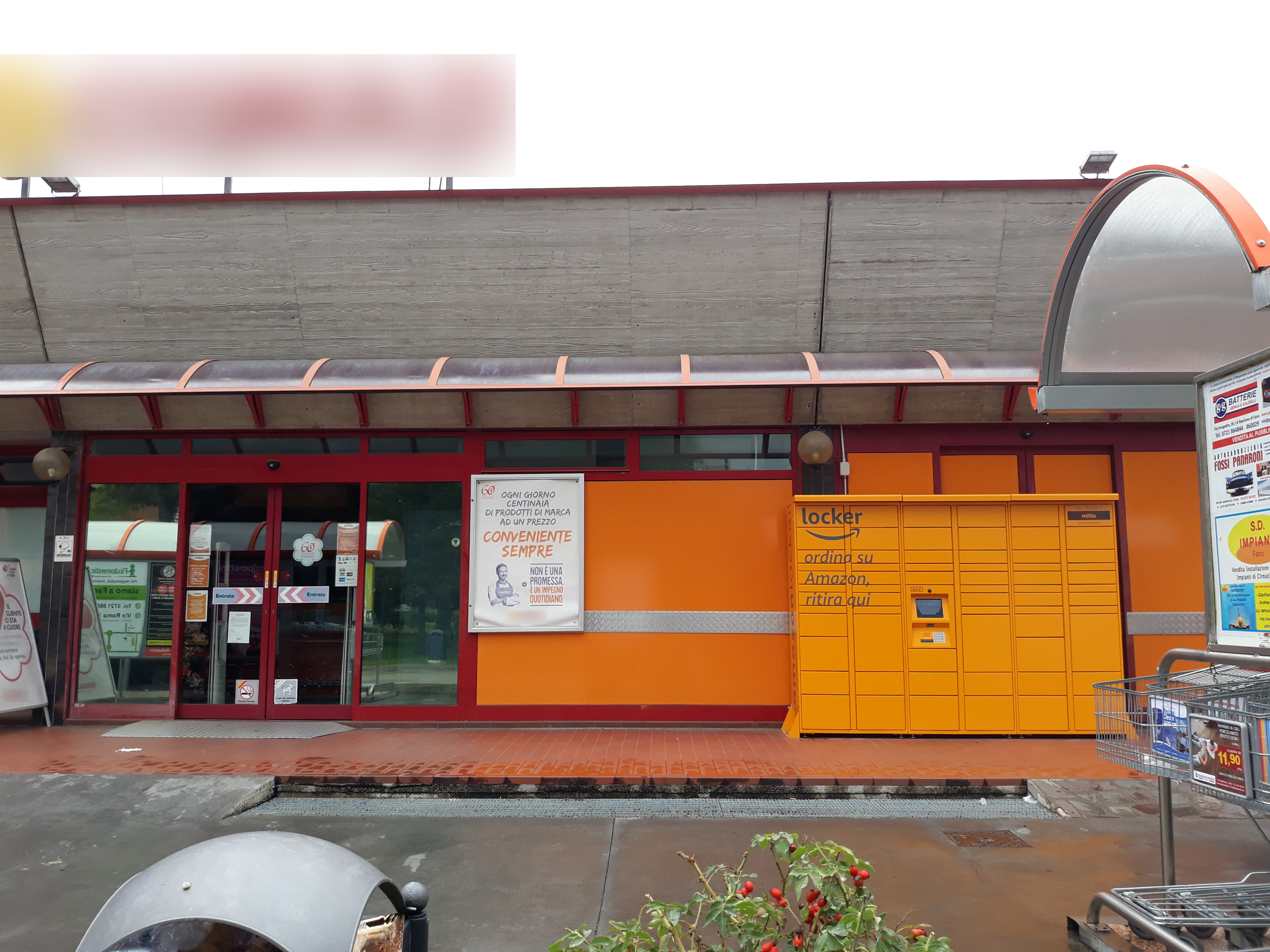
An Amazon Locker near a supermarket in Fano, Italy

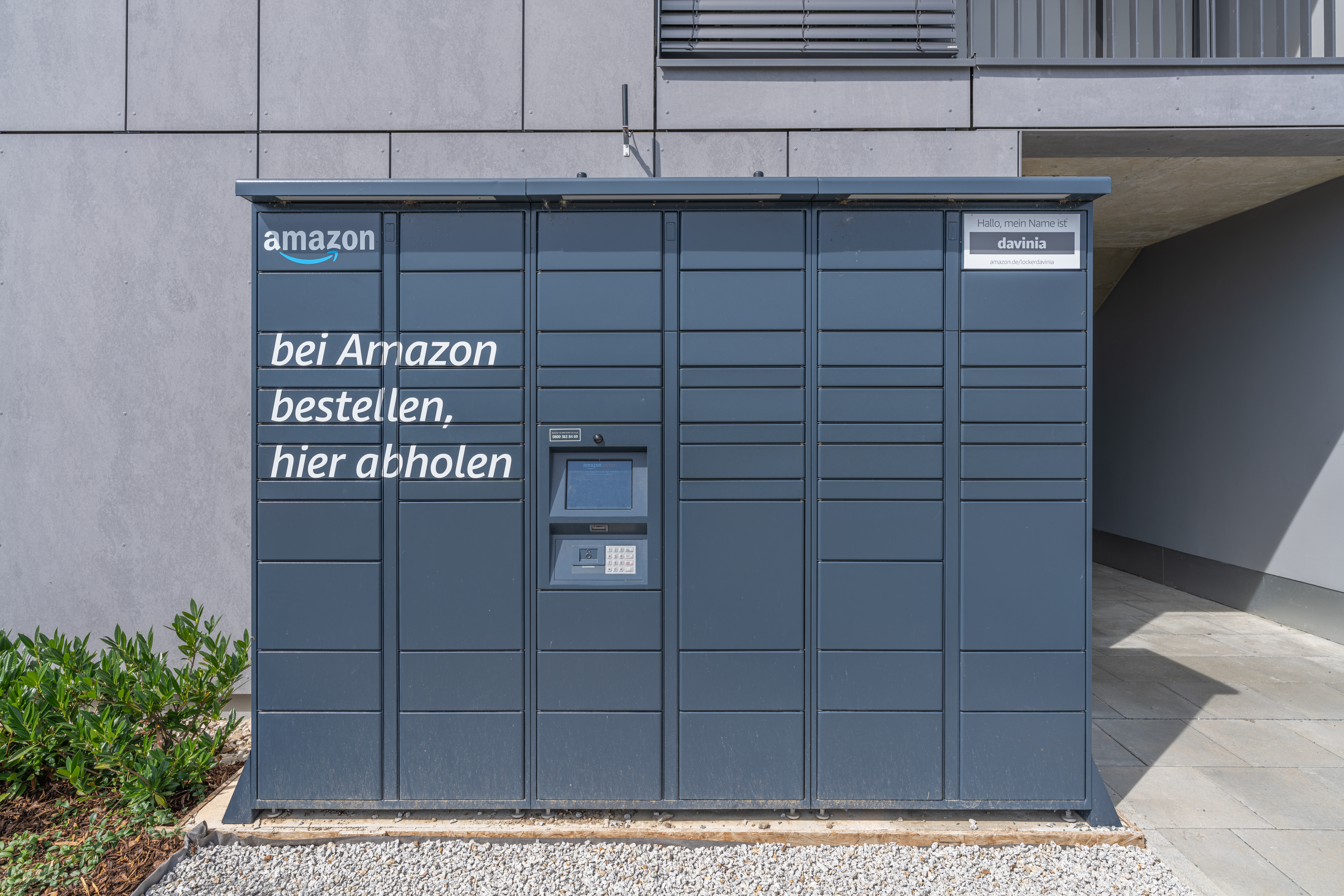
An Amazon Locker near a student dormitory in Hof, Germany

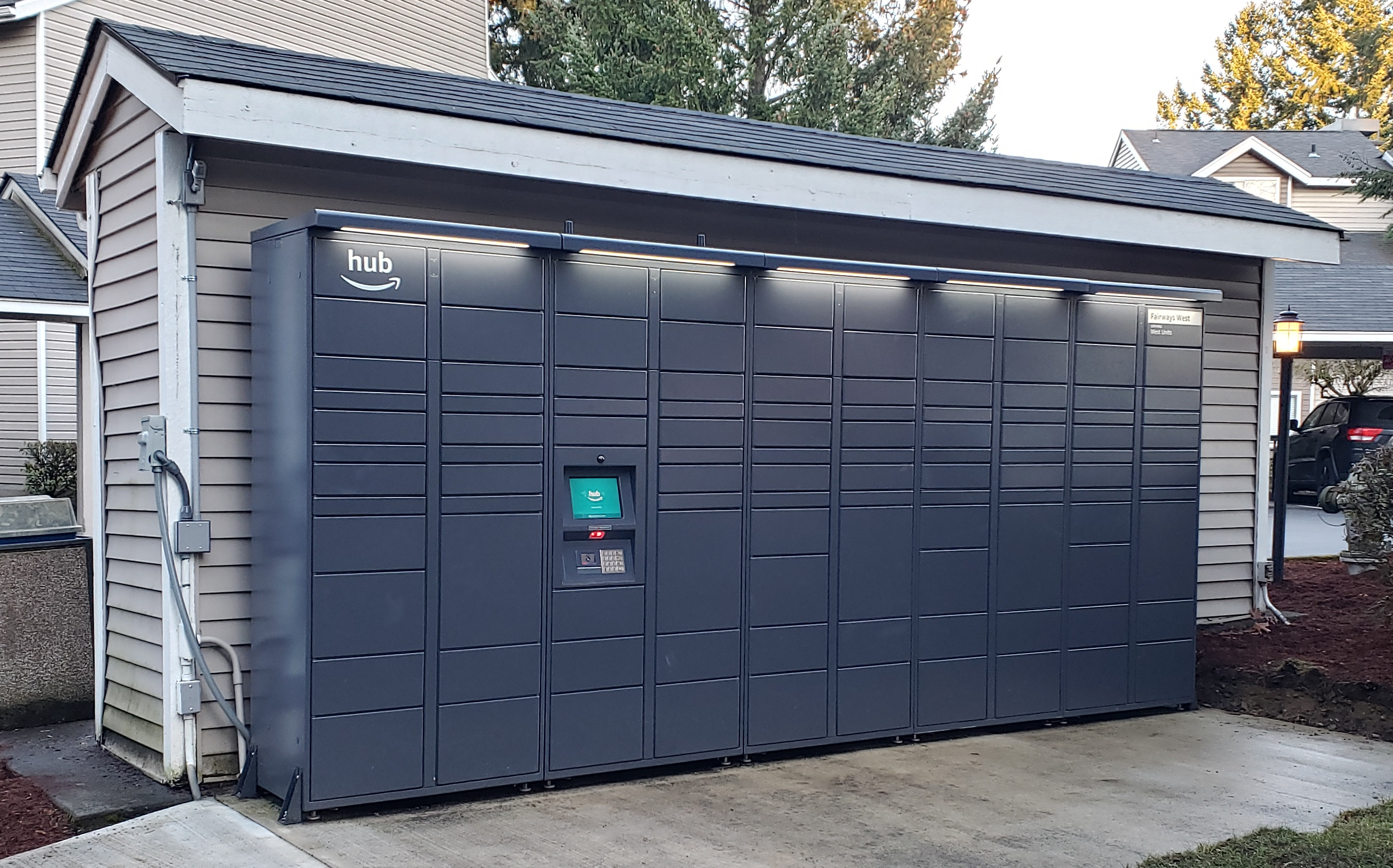
An Amazon Hub at an apartment complex

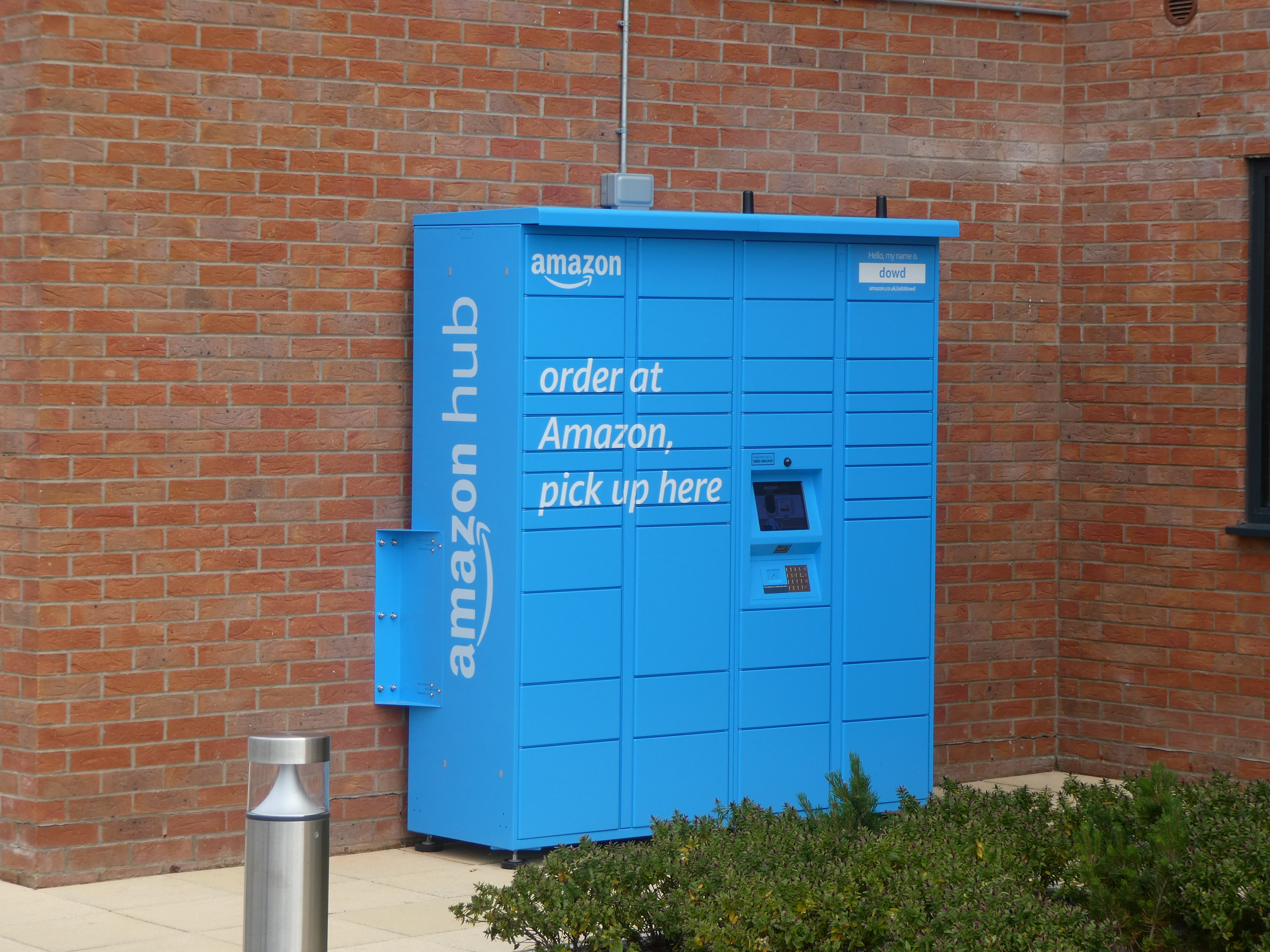
An Amazon Hub outside a Premier Inn in Scarborough, North Yorkshire

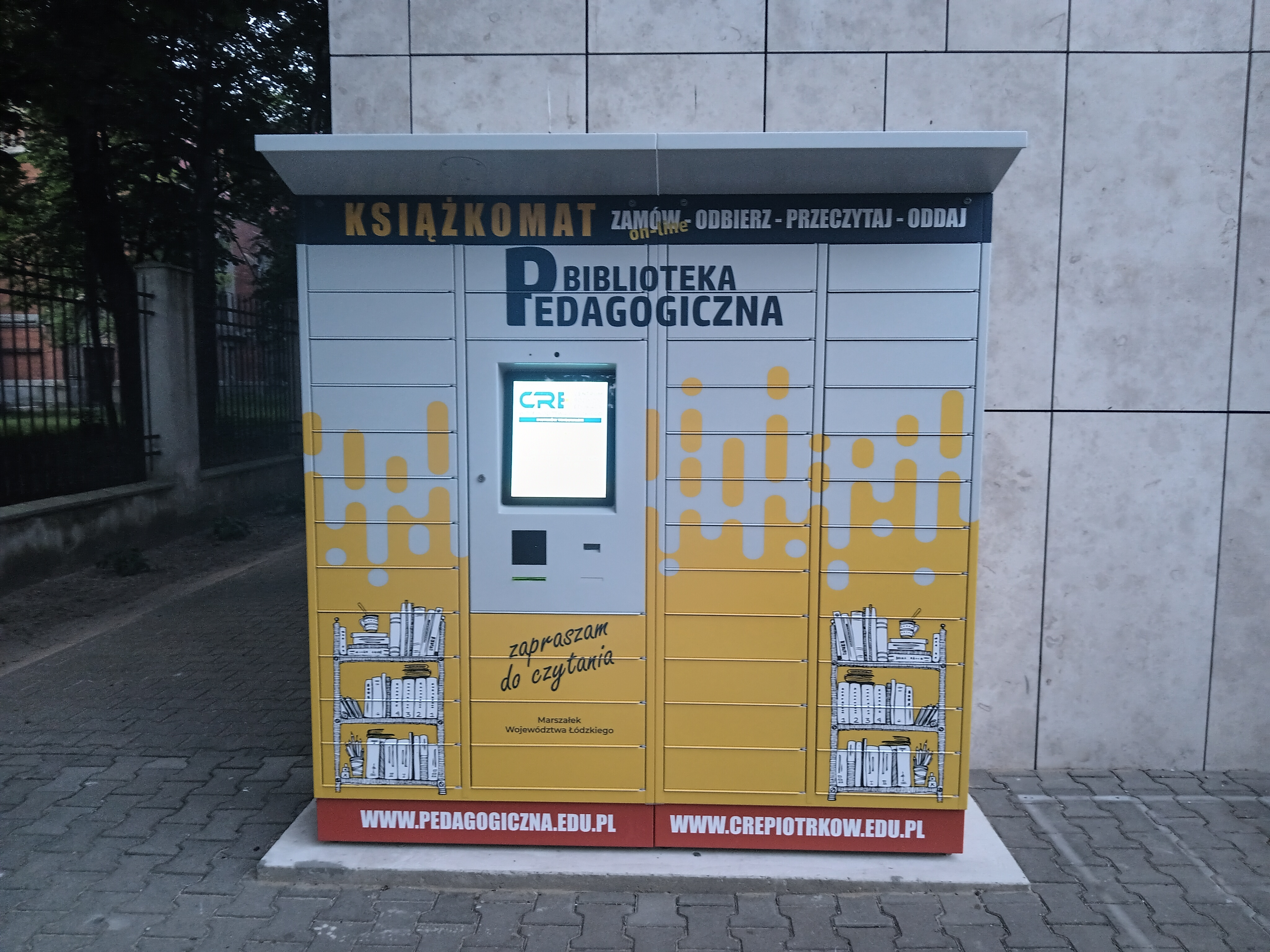
A machine for retrieving and returning books to the library (Poland)

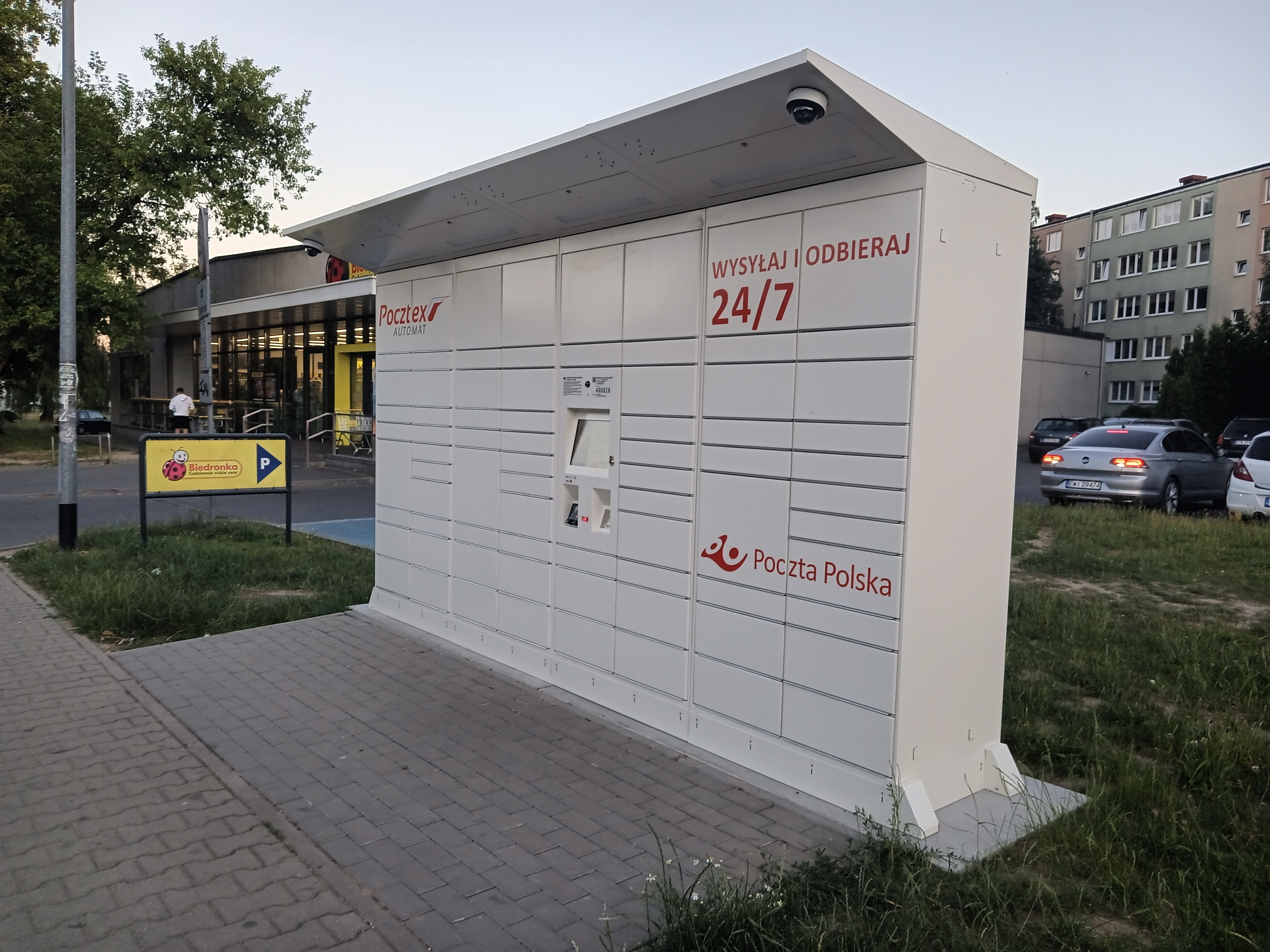
Polish Post parcel machine
