= Alza.cz =

Czech ecommerce website

- Industry: e-commerce retail
- Headquarters: Prague, Czech Republic
- Revenue: 61,074,905,000 Czech koruna (2024)
- Operating income: 3,486,106,000 Czech koruna (2024)
- Net income: 2,297,883,000 Czech koruna (2024)
- Total assets: 17,842,090,000 Czech koruna (2024)
- Number of employees: 2,096 (2024)

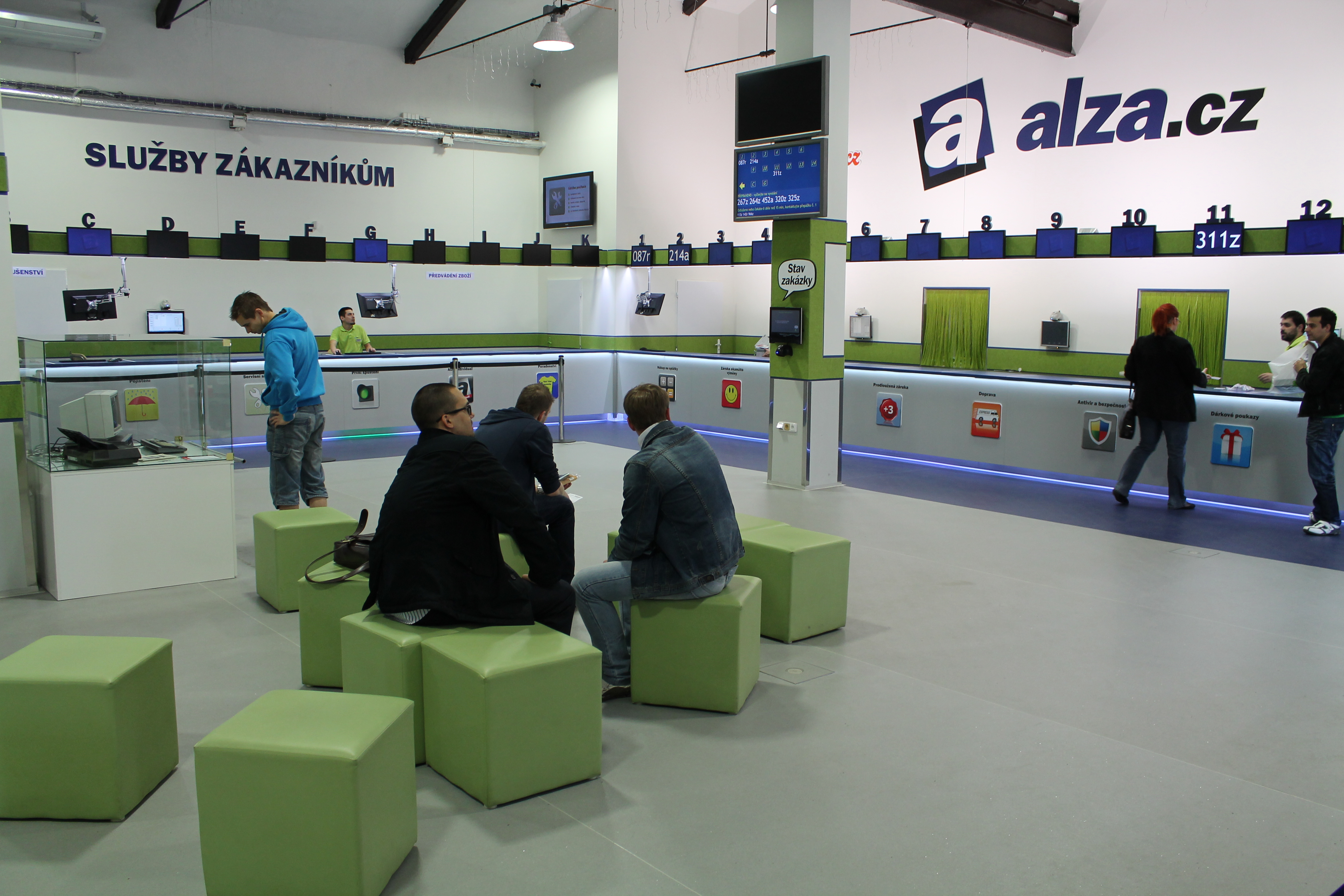

Alza.cz a.s. is a Czech e-commerce company headquartered in Prague, Czech Republic. Founded in 1994 as Alzasoft, it is the largest online retailer in the Czech Republic and one of the leading e-commerce companies in Central Europe. Originally focused on consumer electronics, the company has expanded its product range to include categories such as household goods, toys, media, beauty products, sports equipment and hobby products.

Alza operates localized online stores in the Czech Republic, Slovakia (Alza.sk), Hungary (Alza.hu), Austria (Alza.at) and Germany (Alza.de). The company combines online retail with physical stores, showrooms and the parcel locker network AlzaBox, which provides automated pickup and delivery services across several Central European markets.

Alza.cz is privately held through the holding company L. S. Investments Limited. Its founder Aleš Zavoral is chief executive officer and chairman of the board. In 2024, the company reported revenue of more than CZK 61 billion and net profit of CZK 2.3 billion.

== History ==
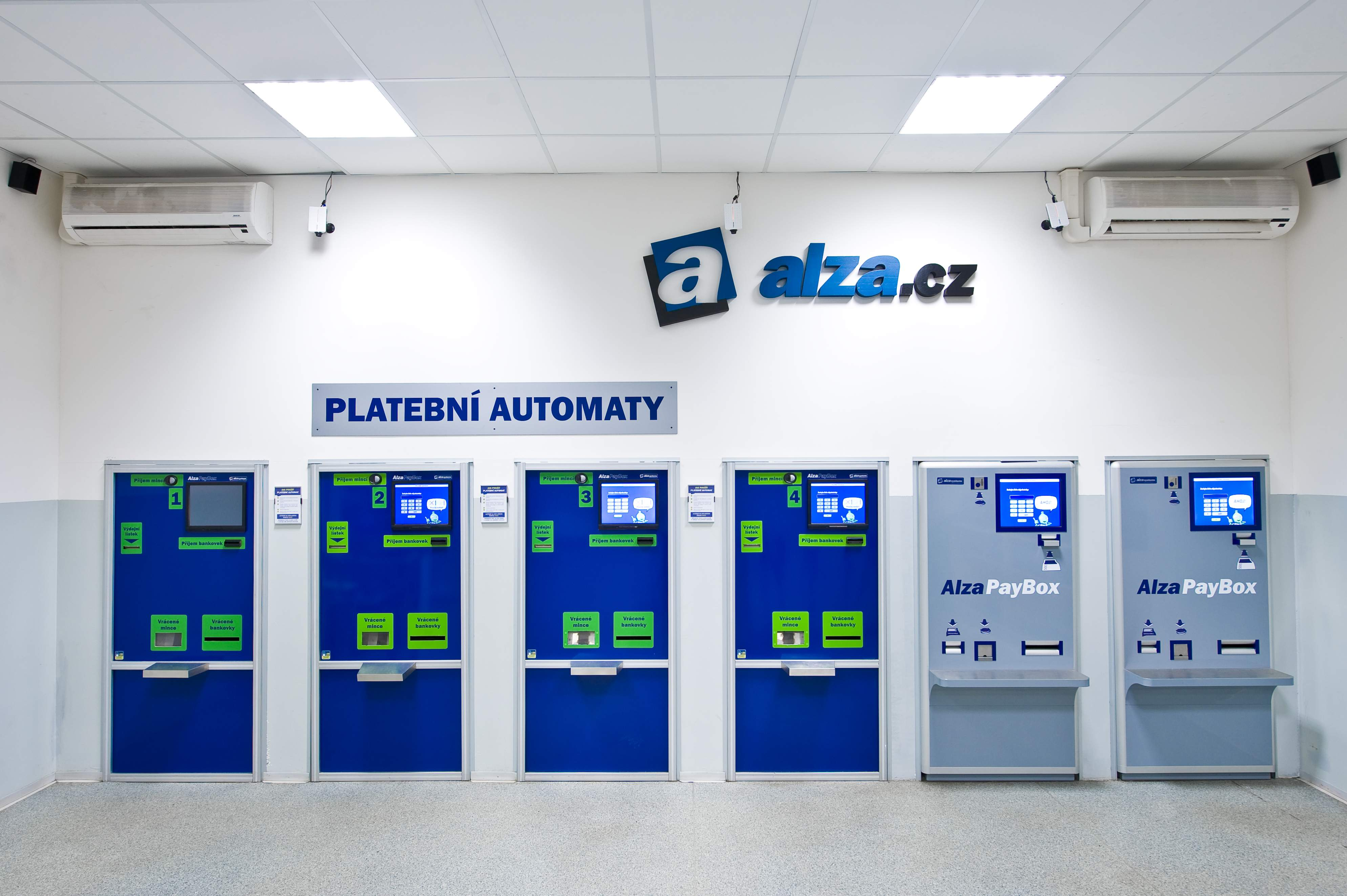
Alza Paybox

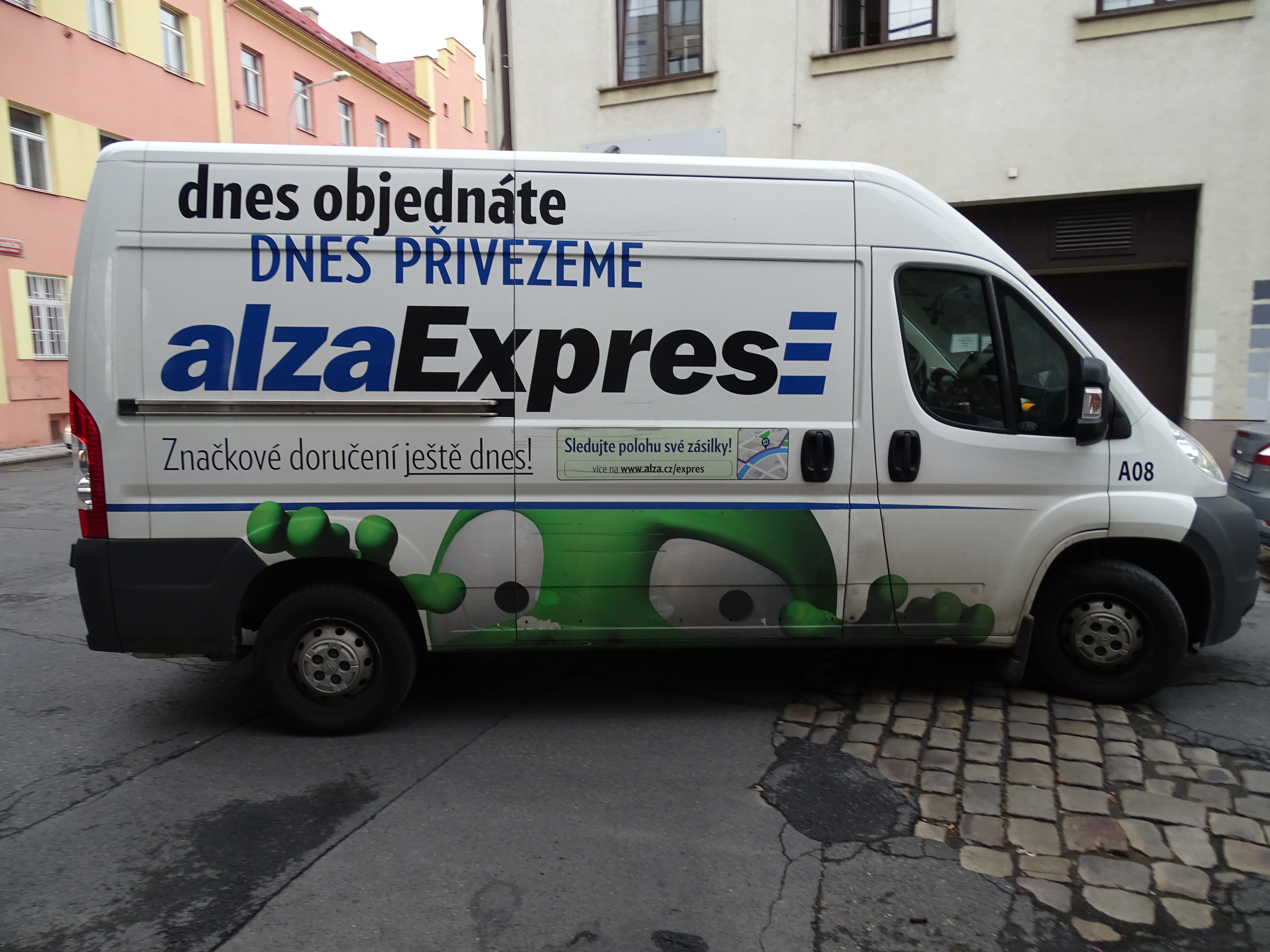
AlzaExpres delivery service

=== Founding and early e-commerce development (1994–2005) ===
Alza was founded in 1994 by Aleš Zavoral under the name Alzasoft. The company initially focused on selling computer hardware and consumer electronics. In 1998, Alzasoft launched its first website and opened its first physical store on Dělnická Street in Prague. The website initially was a company presentation, but became an e-commerce store in 2000, when Alzasoft moved to larger premises on Jateční Street in Prague. In August 2002, the company's store and warehouses were affected by the 2002 European floods, but the company continued its development.

On 1 January 2004, Alzasoft became the joint-stock company Alzasoft a.s. At the time, the company employed 35 people. It expanded into Slovakia, opening operations in cities including Bratislava, Nitra, Trenčín and Trnava. During this period, the company's facilities in Prague's Holešovice district were expanded, with warehouse space reaching approximately 1,600 m².

=== Rebranding and growth of online retail (2006–2014) ===
In 2006, the company was renamed Alza.cz. In 2008, it introduced Alzák, a green alien advertising mascot voiced by Bohdan Tůma. The character became one of the most recognisable advertising symbols in the Czech Republic and Slovakia.

In 2010, Alza opened a new logistics centre in Prague's Horní Počernice district to support the continued growth of its online retail operations.

=== Central European expansion and platform development (2015–2021) ===
From 2015, Alza expanded beyond its original Czech and Slovak markets and developed from an online consumer electronics retailer into a broader e-commerce platform. In 2015, the company launched Alza Premium, a paid membership programme offering benefits including free delivery and additional customer services.

Alza expanded into Hungary in 2016 and Austria in 2017 while continuing to invest in warehouses, delivery infrastructure and customer pickup locations. During this period, the company expanded the AlzaBox parcel locker network, which later became a key part of its delivery infrastructure.

In 2021, Alza launched Alza Marketplace, allowing third-party sellers to offer products through its platform. The company also expanded its logistics network, including a distribution centre in Chrášťany near Prague, and reported revenue of approximately CZK 45 billion.

=== Recent developments (2022–present) ===
During the 2020s, Alza continued its transformation from an online consumer electronics retailer into a broader e-commerce platform combining direct retail, marketplace services and logistics infrastructure. The company expanded Alza Marketplace, increased the scale of the AlzaBox parcel locker network and broadened its product range beyond electronics.

Following the rapid growth of online shopping during the COVID-19 pandemic, Alza focused on operational efficiency and profitability. In 2024, the company reported record revenue of approximately CZK 61 billion and net profit of CZK 2.3 billion.

== Business model and operations ==
Alza operates primarily as an e-commerce retailer, with its origins in computer hardware and consumer electronics. Over time, the company expanded into additional consumer categories, including household goods, toys, beauty products, sports equipment, hobby products and pet supplies. The company combines direct retail with marketplace services through Alza Marketplace, which allows third-party sellers to offer products through its platform.

Alza operates localized online stores in the Czech Republic, Slovakia, Hungary, Austria and Germany. The company combines online sales with physical stores, showrooms and customer pickup locations, creating an omnichannel retail model. While the Czech Republic remains its largest market, international markets have become an important part of the company's business.

Alza has developed its own logistics infrastructure to support delivery and customer pickup. The company operates distribution centres in Central Europe, including facilities near Prague and in Slovakia and Hungary. A key part of its logistics network is AlzaBox, a parcel locker system that provides automated pickup and delivery services. The network has expanded to more than 3,100 locations and has become one of the company's main logistics advantages. While the Czech Republic remains its largest market, international markets have become an important part of the company's business.
