= Chrášťany =

Chrášťany or Chrašťany may refer to places in the Czech Republic:

- Chrášťany (Benešov District), a municipality and village in the Central Bohemian Region
- Chrášťany (České Budějovice District), a municipality and village in the South Bohemian Region
- Chrášťany (Kolín District), a municipality and village in the Central Bohemian Region
- Chrášťany (Prague-West District), a municipality and village in the Central Bohemian Region
- Chrášťany (Rakovník District), a municipality and village in the Central Bohemian Region
- Chrášťany, a village and part of Hulín in the Zlín Region
- Chrašťany, a village and part of Krásný Dvůr in the Ústí nad Labem Region
- Chrášťany, a village and part of Podsedice in the Ústí nad Labem Region
