= Turris Omnia =

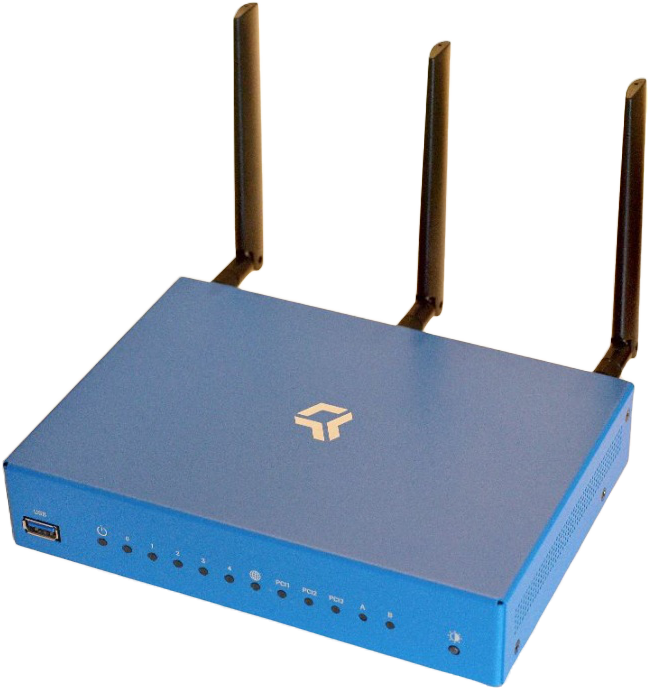
The Turris Omnia

Turris Omnia started as a crowdfunded open-source SOHO network router developed by the CZ.NIC association.

On 31 January 2016 the Turris Omnia was presented at FOSDEM 2016.

Routers from campaign were delivered in 2016. After that, routers started to be sold through various resellers including Alza.cz, Amazon and various local resellers.

== Design ==
The Turris Omnia is designed to provide its owner with freedom in use. As such it uses open-source software. In addition, the creators published the electrical schematics.

It also incorporates several security measures. It features automated software updates, so software vulnerabilities can be addressed quickly, a unique feature among SOHO routers. It also enables DNSSEC by default and also allows people to easily participate in distributed adaptive firewall which tries to automatically identify attackers by collecting data from numerous sources.

Apart from that, the router yields a sufficient performance that it can handle gigabit traffic and double as home server, NAS and print server.

== Funding ==
Funding for the Turris Omnia initially funded via a crowdfunding campaign at Indiegogo with a target of US$100 000 by 12 January 2016. As the deadline passed, the funding had reached US$857 000.

At the end of campaign, the funding had reached 1 223 230 US$.

Since then, router is sold in retail via various resellers.

== Specifications ==
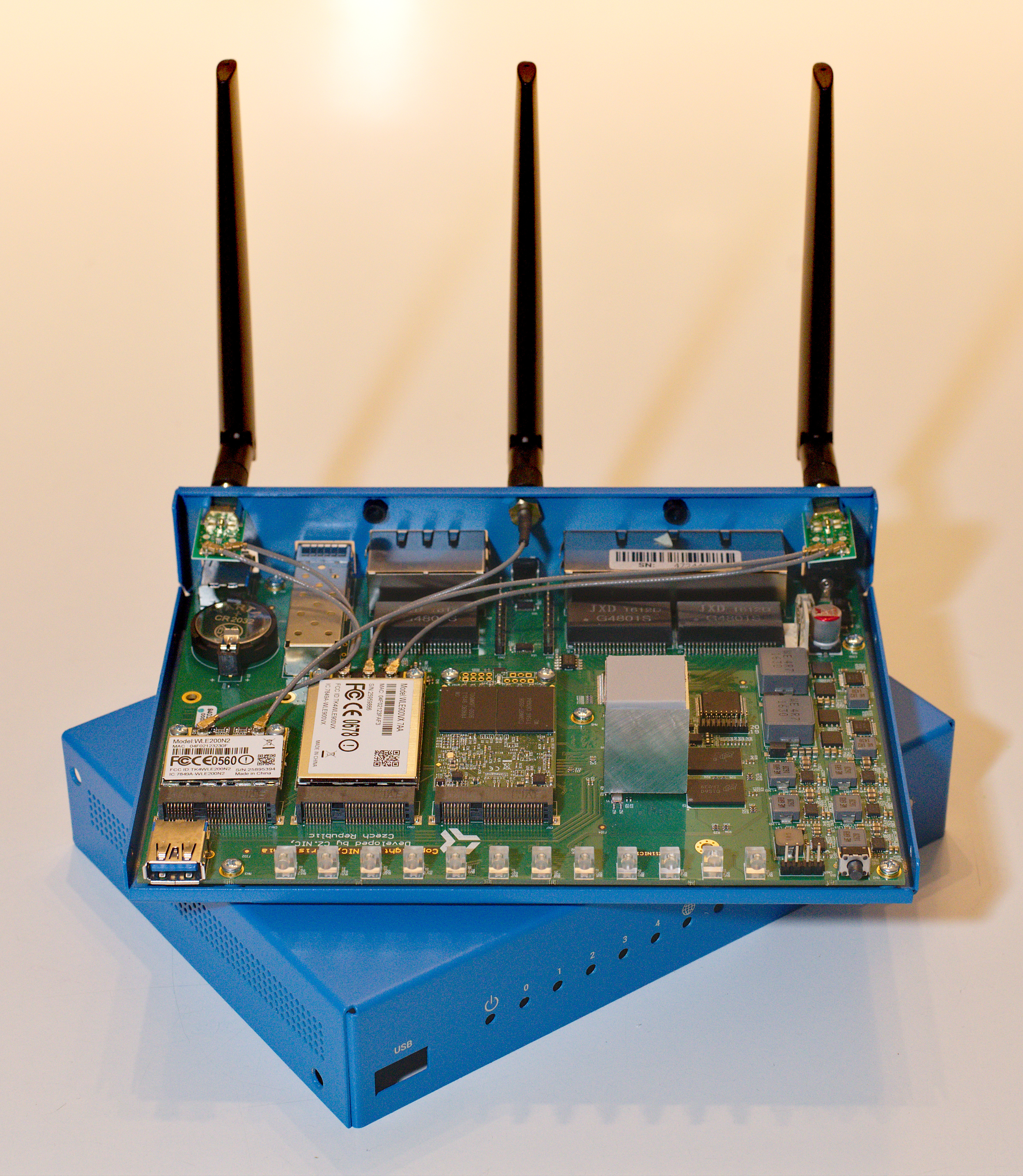
The Turris Omnia without its cover

It is powered by a 1.6 GHz dual-core Marvell Armada 385 ARM CPU. The base model now has 2 GB RAM and 8 GB flash storage, a real-time clock with battery backup, a SFP module and a hardware cryptographically secure pseudorandom number generator. Via Mini PCI Express it supports Wi-Fi in the form of 3×3 MIMO 802.11ac and the older 2×2 MIMO 802.11b/g/n.

Its connectivity consists of:

- 1 WAN and 5 LAN gigabit ports
- 2 USB 3.0 ports
- 2 Mini PCI Express
- 1 mSATA / mini PCI Express
- 1 SIM card slot

Initially the devices shipped with 1 GB RAM by default with a 2 GB upgrade available, however 2 GB is now the default configuration.

== Software ==
The Turris Omnia runs the Turris OS, an OpenWrt derivative. It can be managed by web interfaces as well as by CLI. The main web interface is now reForis which is the successor of the legacy Foris; it offers features for regular users, such as WAN and LAN configuration or system reboot. Advanced users can utilize LuCI, the standard web user interface in OpenWrt.
