= Chrášťany (České Budějovice District) =

- Municipality
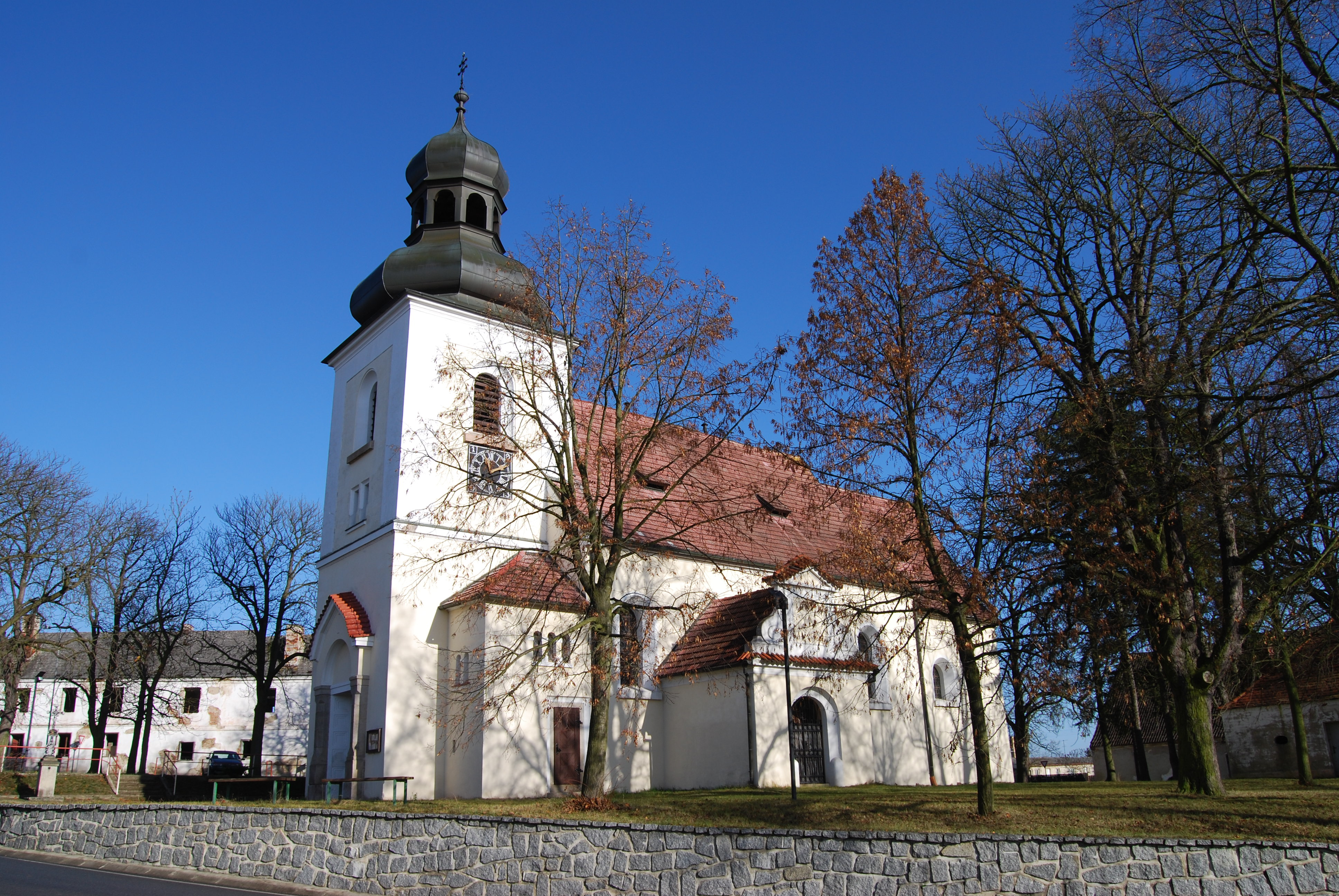
- Church of Saint Bartholomew

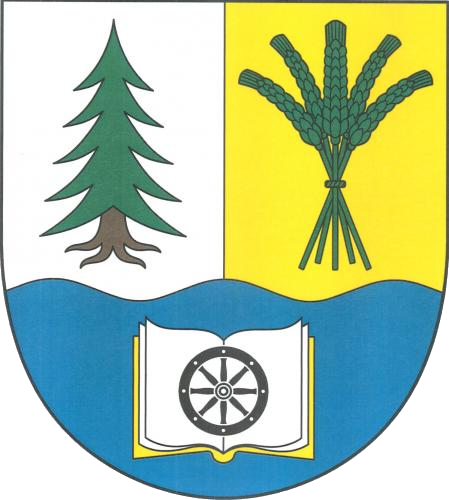
- Flag Coat of arms

- Location in the Czech Republic
- Coordinates: 49°17′46″N 14°23′15″E
- Country: Czech Republic
- Region: South Bohemian
- District: České Budějovice
- First mentioned: 1352

Area
  - Total: 22.93 km^{2} (8.85 sq mi)
- Elevation: 451 m (1,480 ft)

Population (2026-01-01)
  - Total: 721
  - Density: 31.4/km^{2} (81.4/sq mi)
- Time zone: UTC+1 (CET)
  - Summer (DST): UTC+2 (CEST)
- Postal codes: 373 04, 375 01
- Website: www.chrastany.eu

Chrášťany is a municipality and village in České Budějovice District in the South Bohemian Region of the Czech Republic. It has about 700 inhabitants.

Chrášťany lies approximately 37 kilometres (23 mi) north of České Budějovice and 88 km (55 mi) south of Prague.

== Administrative division ==
Chrášťany consists of five municipal parts (in brackets population according to the 2021 census):

- Chrášťany (406)
- Doubrava (66)
- Doubravka (101)
- Koloměřice (123)
- Pašovice (19)

== Demographics ==
Historical population
Year	Pop.	±%
1869	1,780	—
1880	1,721	−3.3%
1890	1,646	−4.4%
1900	1,664	+1.1%
1910	1,590	−4.4%
1921	1,574	−1.0%
1930	1,532	−2.7%
1950	1,092	−28.7%
1961	1,018	−6.8%
1970	907	−10.9%
1980	828	−8.7%
1991	782	−5.6%
2001	700	−10.5%
2011	709	+1.3%
2021	715	+0.8%
Source: Censuses
