= Chrášťany (Rakovník District) =

- Municipality
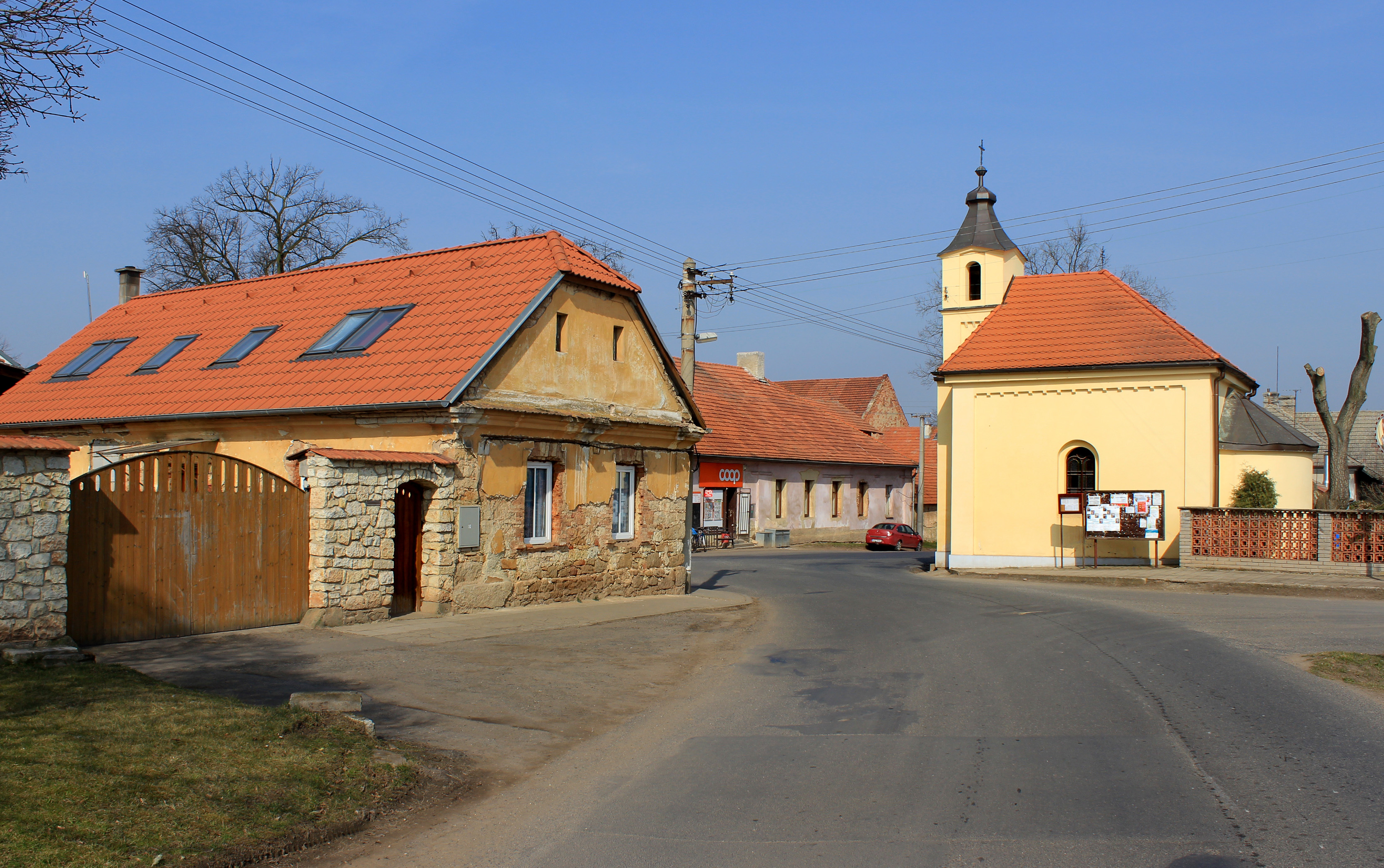
- Centre of Chrášťany

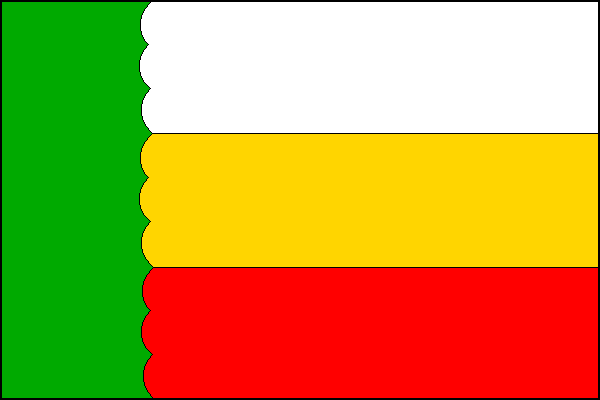
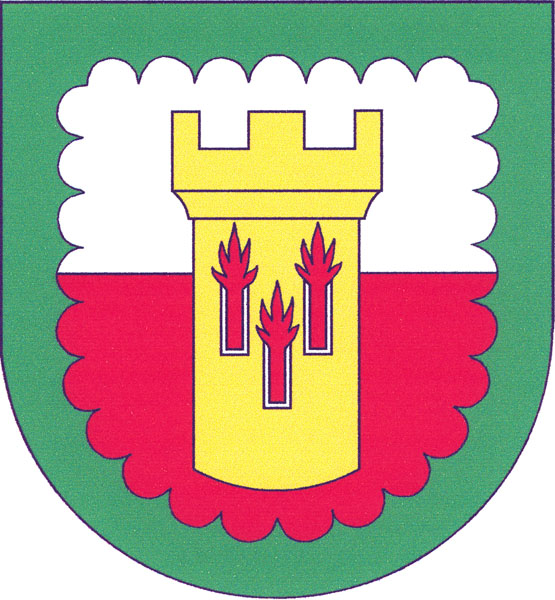
- Flag Coat of arms

- Location in the Czech Republic
- Coordinates: 50°8′48″N 13°40′2″E
- Country: Czech Republic
- Region: Central Bohemian
- District: Rakovník
- First mentioned: 1295

Area
  - Total: 10.15 km^{2} (3.92 sq mi)
- Elevation: 385 m (1,263 ft)

Population (2026-01-01)
  - Total: 688
  - Density: 67.8/km^{2} (176/sq mi)
- Time zone: UTC+1 (CET)
  - Summer (DST): UTC+2 (CEST)
- Postal code: 270 01
- Website: www.chrastanyurakovnika.cz

Chrášťany is a municipality and village in Rakovník District in the Central Bohemian Region of the Czech Republic. It has about 700 inhabitants.

== Administrative division ==
Chrášťany consists of two municipal parts (in brackets population according to the 2021 census):

- Chrášťany (578)
- Nový Dvůr (55)

== Demographics ==
Historical population
Year	Pop.	±%
1869	837	—
1880	954	+14.0%
1890	986	+3.4%
1900	921	−6.6%
1910	968	+5.1%
1921	1,050	+8.5%
1930	1,016	−3.2%
1950	697	−31.4%
1961	641	−8.0%
1970	617	−3.7%
1980	580	−6.0%
1991	558	−3.8%
2001	565	+1.3%
2011	640	+13.3%
2021	633	−1.1%
Source: Censuses
