= KEBA =

Austrian technology company

KEBA Group AG
- Type: Stock corporation
- Industry: Automation
- Founded: 1968
- Headquarters: Linz, Upper Austria, Austria
- Key people: Christoph Knogler (CEO), Andreas Schoberleitner (CFO)
- Revenue: 474,6 Mio. €
- Number of employees: 2000
- Website: www.keba.com

KEBA Group AG is an international developer and manufacturer of automation solutions for the industrial, banking, services and energy automation areas. The Austrian company was founded in 1968 and is privately owned. The company has annual sales revenues of €474,6 million, of which over 90% are obtained in export markets.

KEBA Group headquarters are located in Linz, Austria and it is represented by its own subsidiaries in China, Germany, Italy, India, Japan, the Netherlands, Romania, South Korea, Switzerland, Taiwan, the Czech Republic, Serbia, Turkey and the United States.

== Areas of activity ==
In the industrial automation area KEBA focuses on solutions for

- Plastics injection moulding machines and robots
- General machinery production and plant building
- The sheet metal processing sector
- Mobile and stationary operating solutions for machines and robots

In the area of banking automation

- Self-service systems for banks and financial institutions (ATMs, cash recycling systems, bank statement printers, transfer terminals)

In the area of logistics automation

- First- and Last Mile transfer systems for postal and logistics companies (parcel machine)
- Intelligent transfer machines for sensitive objects (KEMAS)

In the area of energy automation

- Solutions in the field of e-mobility such as charging stations
- Control and operating systems for alternative heating systems

In the lottery sector

- Automation solutions for lottery companies

== Products ==
KEBA AG provides products in the following areas:

- Controllers for injection molding machines, machines and robots, programmable logic controllers (PLC), industrial PC, (KePlast, KeMotion, KeSystems, KeControl)
- Controls for press brakes and sheet metal working (Delem)
- Mobile and stationary operator terminals, handheld terminals, panels for machines and robots, mobile automation (KeMobile, KeTop)
- ATMs, cash recyclers, account photo terminals, bank statement printers, bank transfer terminals, self-service systems for financial institutions (KePlus)
- Entry control systems (KeBin)
- Parcel machines (KePol) and transfer machines (KEMAS)
- Lottery machines (KeWin)
- Charging stations, electric mobility infrastructure, load management for charging electric vehicles (KeContact, KeMove)
- Controls and operating systems for alternative heating systems (KeEnergy)

The acquisition of the LTI Motion Group and Heinz Fiege GmbH has expanded the product portfolio of the KEBA Group. In drive and automation technology LTI Motion GmbH and Fiege GmbH develops, produces and distributes high-end drive technology from tool spindles and servo drive technology all the way to magnetically supported high-speed complete systems.

== History ==
The company was founded in 1968 by Gunther Krippner, who was joined by Karl Kletzmair in 1970. 1984 saw the concentration on the industrial, banking and sawmill automation sectors. In 1990, KEBA Deutschland GmbH was founded as a fully owned subsidiary. In 1994, KEBA obtained DIN ISO 9001 certification. In 1998, the KEBA US Corp. was founded. In 1999, KEBA AG achieved sales revenues of ATS 1 billion for the first time. The main emphasis was on industrial and banking automation. In the same year, the legal form of the company was altered to that of a stock corporation. In 2003, the company moved into a new headquarters building in Linz. In 2004, a subsidiary was founded in China and this was followed by two further Chinese locations. In 2006, KEBA Automation S.R.L. was launched in Romania and in the same year a holding was taken in agimatec GmbH.

In 2007, the CBPM-KEBA joint venture in Beijing was founded with the China Banknote Printing and Minting Corporation, the world’s largest banknote printing house. In 2008, the branch in Taiwan was opened. In 2009, further branches were launched in Turkey, China and Italy. In the same year, the energy automation field was entered with charging stations. In 2010, the area of heating control systems for alternative energy forms was opened up and KEBA also opened a branch in Japan. In 2012, a branch was founded in South Korea. In 2013, KEBA purchased a majority holding in the Dutch automation company DELEM. In 2013, KEBA opened a second production site in Linz, Austria. In 2016, KEBA AG took over the self-service specialist KEMAS GmbH, a German company based in Oberlungwitz. In 2018, KEBA opened another branch in India.

At the end of 2018, KEBA AG took over LTI Motion and Heinz Fiege GmbH, leading suppliers of drive solutions and spindle technology based in Lahnau and Röllbach / Germany.

== Awards ==
- iF Product Design Award – KeMes (2018)
- Pegasus in crystal 2016 to Karl Kletzmaier, co-founder of KEBA, for entrepreneurial life's work
- ineo Award Award from the WKO OÖ for the strong commitment in the apprenticeship training
- Robotic Award 2014 for the “directMove” handheld operating device T10
- Upper Austrian Pegasus (business prize) 2014 in Bronze
- Postal Technology Award 2013 as the Supplier of the Year (KePol parcel lockers)
- Austrian Knewledge Award for further training from the Federal Austrian ministry for education, science and culture 2000, 1. place (in the category of companies with up to 500 employees)
