= Bohdan Tůma =

Czech actor and voice actor (born 1967)

Bohdan Tůma (born 6 September 1967) is a Czech actor and voice actor. He is one of the most famous actors in the dubbing industry of Czech Republic, being the main voice actor for Jack Black, Jim Carrey and Denzel Washington.

== Biography ==
Bohdan was born in Prague. While studying singing and acting at Prague Conservatory, he appeared in plays of many theaters, such as Theatre on the Balustrade. Eventually, he began his career of voice acting in 1991.

== Filmography ==
- Tankový prapor (1991) - Pvt. Bamza
- Burning Bush (2013) - Police officer
- Tiger Theory (2016) - Voice of parrot

== Dubbing roles ==
- Wesley Snipes
  - Demolition Man (Simon Phoenix)
  - Murder at 1600 (Detective Harlan Regis)
  - One Night Stand (Maximilian "Max" Carlyle)
  - U.S. Marshals (Mark J. Sheridan / Mark Warren / Mark Roberts)
  - Blade (Eric Brooks / Blade)
  - Rising Sun (Lt. Webster "Web" Smith)
  - Blade II (Eric Brooks / Blade)
  - Liberty Stands Still (Joe)
  - The Marksman (Painter)
  - Unstoppable (Dean Cage)
  - Blade: Trinity (Eric Brooks / Blade)
  - 7 Seconds (Jack Tulliver)
  - The Detonator (Sonni Griffith)
  - The Contractor (James Jackson Dial)
  - Chaos (Jason York / Scott Curtis / Lorenz)
  - Zig Zag (David "Dave" Fletcher)
  - Jungle Fever (Flipper Purify)
  - Hard Luck (Lucky)
  - Coming 2 America (General Izzi)
- Denzel Washington
  - Courage Under Fire (Lt. Colonel Nathaniel Serling)
  - The Siege (Anthony Hubbard)
  - John Q. (John Q. Archibald)
  - The Manchurian Candidate (Maj. Ben Marco)
  - Man on Fire (John W. Creasy)
  - Inside Man (Keith Frazier)
  - Out of Time (Matt Lee Whitlock)
  - Déjà Vu (Doug Carlin)
  - American Gangster (Frank Lucas)
  - The Taking of Pelham 123 (Walter Garber)
  - Malcolm X (Malcolm X)
  - The Book of Eli (Eli)
  - Safe House (Tobin Frost)
  - The Equalizer (Robert McCall)
  - The Magnificent Seven (Sam Chisolm)
  - Fences (Troy Maxson)
  - The Equalizer 2 (Robert McCall)
  - The Little Things (Joe "Deke" Deacon)
- Jim Carrey
  - Batman Forever (Edward Nygma / Riddler)
  - Ace Ventura: Pet Detective (Ace Ventura)
  - The Mask (Stanley Ipkiss / The Mask)
  - Dumb and Dumber (Lloyd Christmas)
  - Ace Ventura: When Nature Calls (Ace Ventura)
  - The Truman Show (Truman Burbank)
  - Once Bitten (Mark Kendall)
  - Yes Man (Carl Allen)
  - Earth Girls Are Easy (Wiploc)
  - Mr. Popper's Penguins (Tom Popper)
  - Anchorman 2: The Legend Continues (Scott Reils)
  - Kidding (Jeff Piccirillo / Mr. Pickles)
  - Sonic the Hedgehog (Dr. Robotnik)
  - Sonic the Hedgehog 2 (Dr. Robotnik)
  - Dark Crimes (Tadek)
- Kevin Bacon
  - Apollo 13 (Jack Swigert)
  - Tremors (Valentine "Val" McKee)
  - Cavedweller (Randall Pritchard)
  - Frost/Nixon (Jack Brennan)
  - X-Men: First Class (Sebastian Shaw)
  - Jayne Mansfield's Car (Carroll Caldwell)
- Jack Black
  - The Holiday (Miles Dumont)
  - Jumanji: Welcome to the Jungle (Professor Sheldon "Shelly" Oberon)
  - The House with a Clock in Its Walls (Jonathan Barnavelt)
  - Jumanji: The Next Level (Professor Sheldon "Shelly" Oberon)
- Will Smith
  - Men in Black II (James Darrel Edwards III/Agent J)
  - Bad Boys (Mike Lowrey)
  - I, Robot (Detective Del Spooner)
  - I Am Legend (Robert Neville)

== Personal life ==
He's married and has two daughters, Denisa and Veronika.
