= Cleveron =

Company based in Estonia

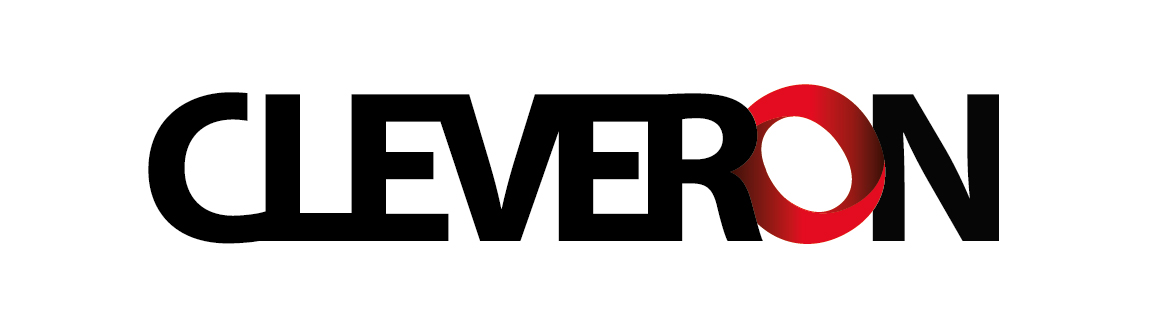
Logo

Cleveron is an Estonian company which produces robotics-based parcel terminals for retail and logistics sectors. Cleveron headquarters are located in Viljandi, Estonia.

Cleveron was established in 2007 when online furniture store ON24's logistics department grew to a logistics company. Initially, the company traded as SmartPOST. In 2010, the brand "SmartPOST" was acquired by Itella. Thereafter, the name Cleveron was used. Cleveron was named as the Company of the Year in Estonia in 2018.

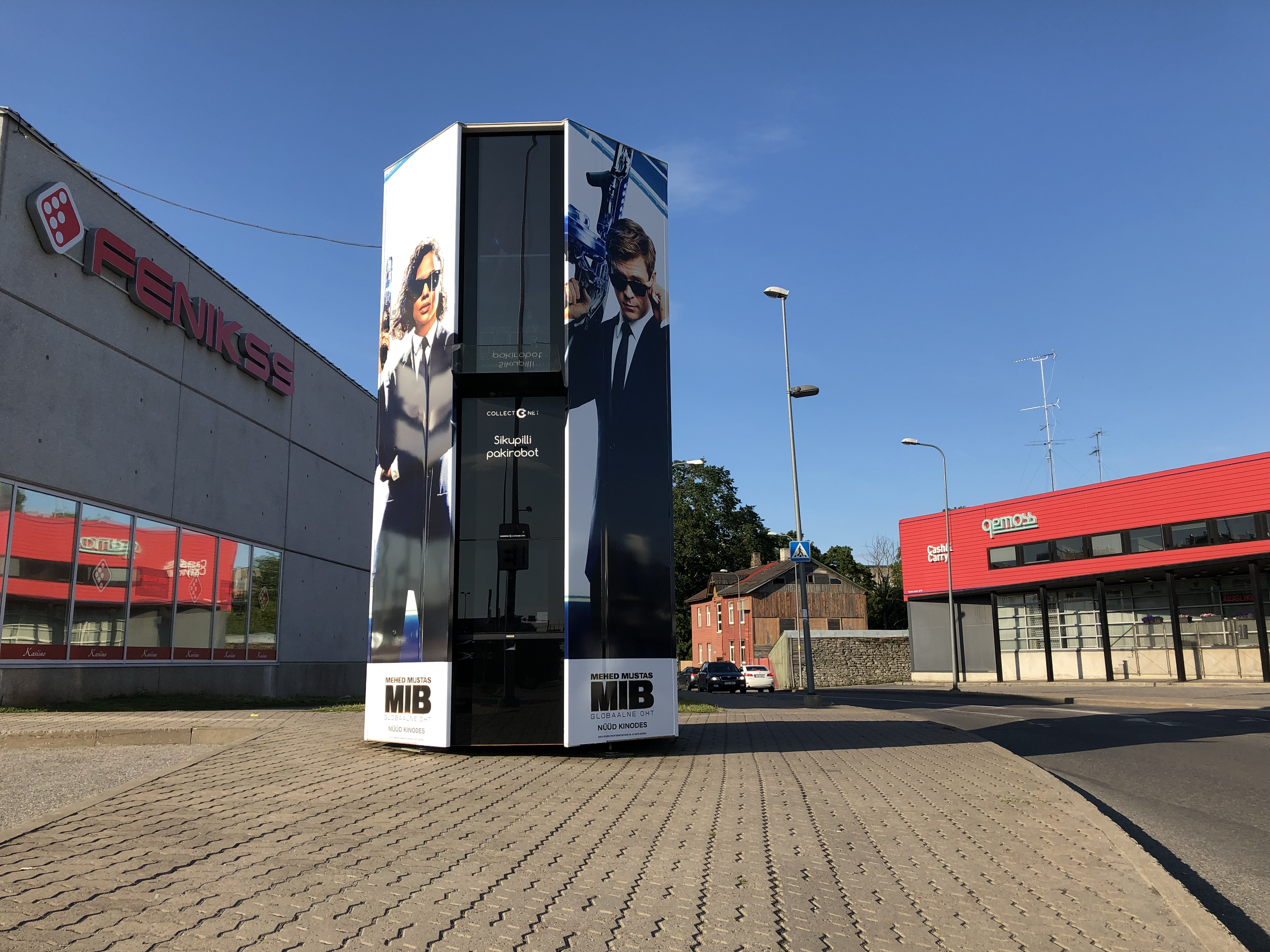
Cleveron's outdoor parcel robot in front of Sikupilli shopping center in Tallinn, Estonia.

In 2014, Cleveron introduced the CleverBox. From 2018, the parcel locker is known as Cleveron 302. Most widely used by logistics companies like Itella SmartPost.

In 2015, Cleveron introduced the robotics-based parcel pickup solution PackRobot. In 2018, the company changes all its product names, giving them a unified system. The PackRobot became Cleveron 401. This product is most known by the name The Pickup Tower, given by the US retailer Walmart, which was the first retail company to install it. In 2020 there are more than 1500 Pickup Towers in Walmart stores all over the USA.

In 2017, Cleveron introduced the CleverFlex. At the time, CleverFlex was the world's largest extendable robotics-based parcel terminal. From 2018, the solution is known as Cleveron 402. Most notable users are Inditex (Zara), Falabella Retail, Decathlon.

In 2018, Cleveron revealed the self-driving robot courier prototype Lotte. The aim of the car was to add a sustainable alternative to couriers and deliver parcels to the customer's personal parcel locker. The company claimed that the prototype would be ready for testing on the streets in the summer of 2020.

In 2019, Cleveron introduced the world's first robotics-based grocery pickup solution Cleveron 501. The solution is used by the largest grocers in Estonia: Coop, Selver and Prisma.

In 2020, Cleveron introduced a parcel handover solution specifically designed for small companies and businesses. The parcel locker could be bought one unit at a time, without needing installation or IT integrations.

Companies which use Cleveron's products include Asda, Canadian Tire, Decathlon, Falabella, Inditex, Lojas Americanas and Walmart.
