= SmartPOST =

Company based in Estonia

SmartPosti
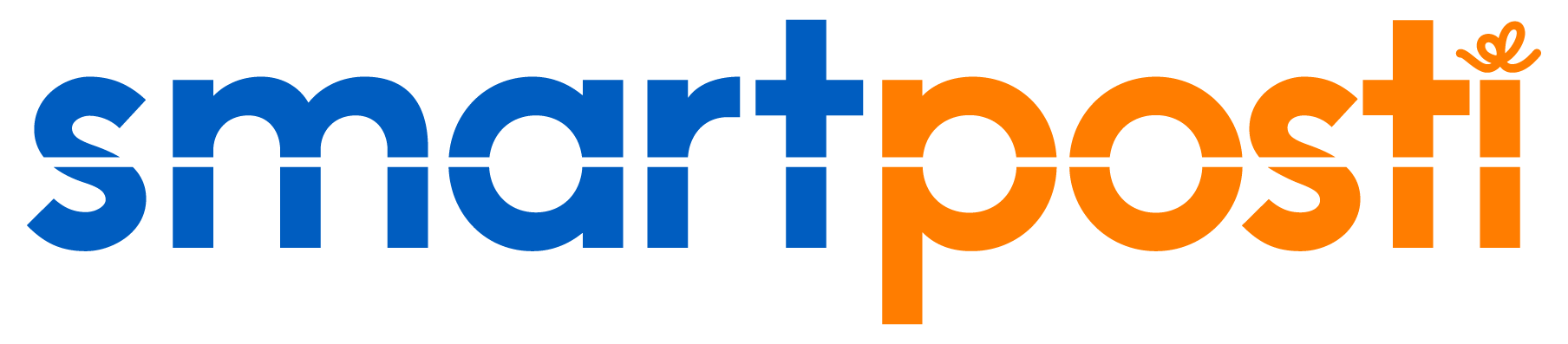
- Company type: Courier
- Industry: Logistics
- Founded: 2006
- Headquarters: Tallinn, Estonia
- Owner: Posti Group
- Website: http://smartposti.ee/

SmartPosti is a company operating in the Baltic region. The company provides parcel delivery, pallet transportation, warehousing, and courier services for private customers and businesses. SmartPosti is part of Posti Group.

Founded in 2008, SmartPosti currently operates more than 1000 parcel lockers and parcel points over Baltics.

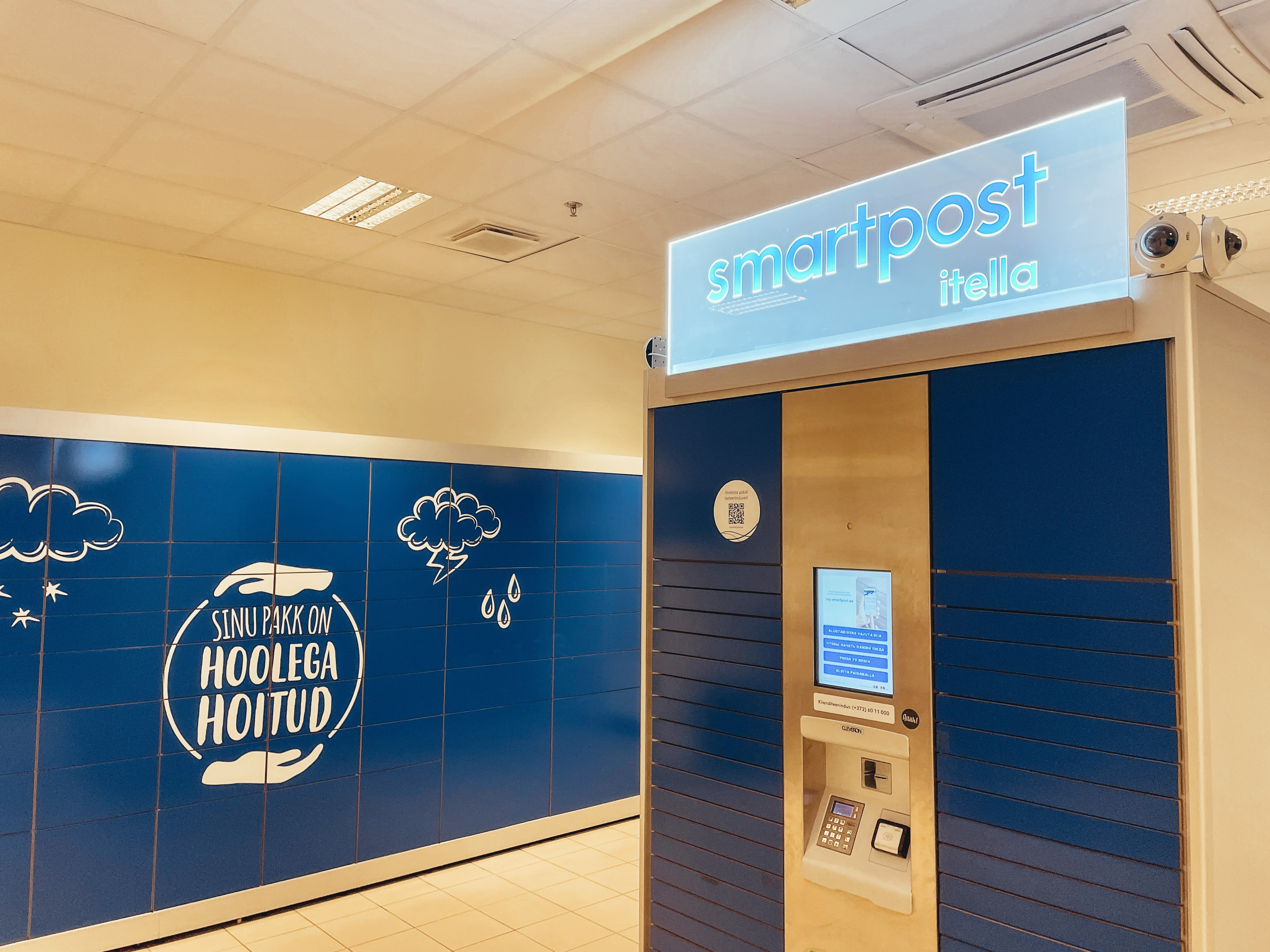
SmartPosti's blue parcel locker

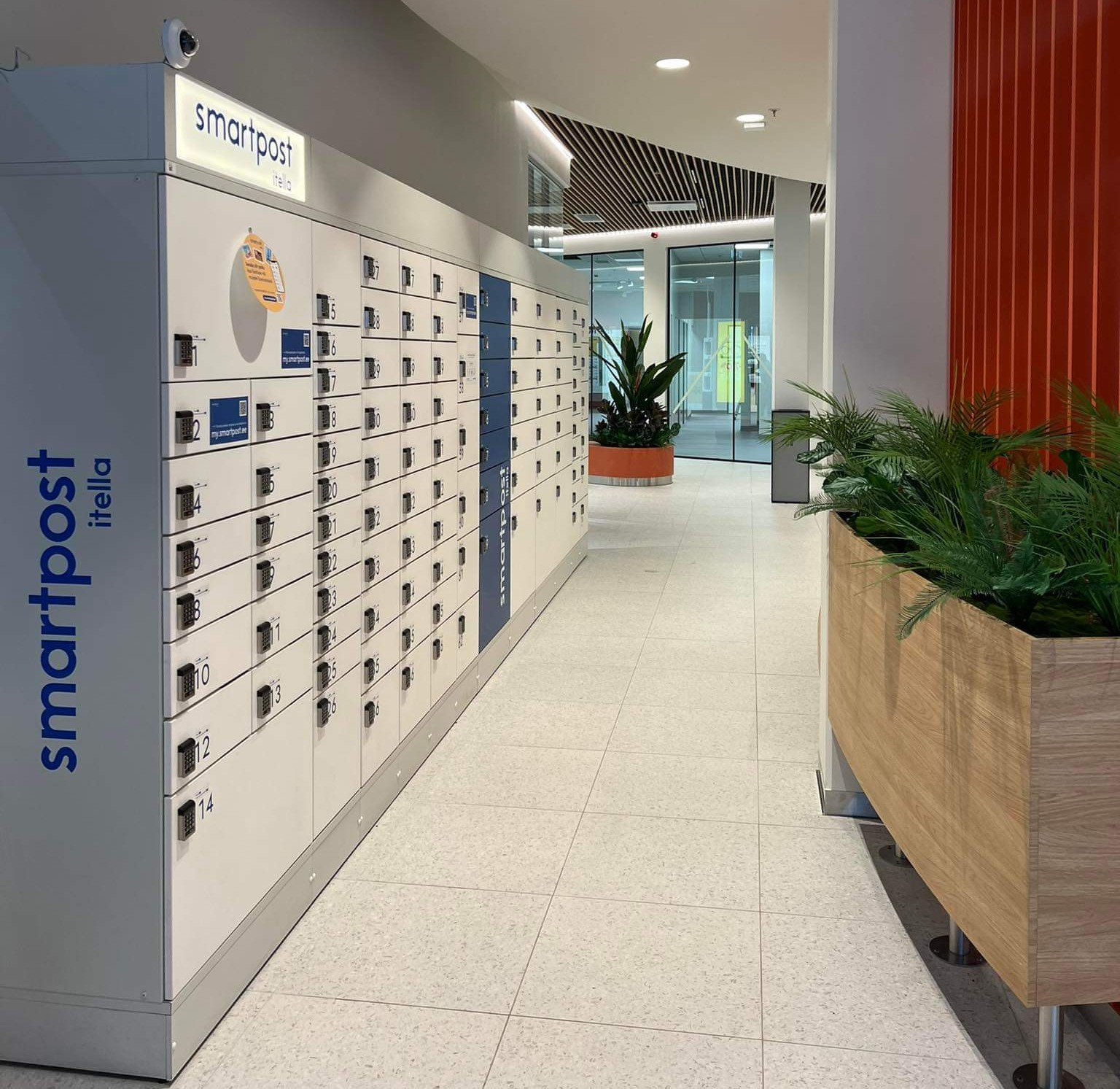
SmartPosti's white parcel locker

Currently, SmartPosti is servicing roughly two hundred distant selling companies and online shops in Estonia, Latvia and Lithuania.

In 2025, Posti Group, the parent company of logistics provider SmartPosti, renewed the organizational structure in eCommerce and Delivery Services business group (eCD) and Gediminas Mickus become Vice President for the Baltics and joined leadership team of Posti Group's ecommerce and delivery business.

== Controversy regarding advertising ==
In October 2009, Estonia's national postal company Eesti Post filed a complaint with the Estonian Consumer Union, claiming that SmartPosti's television advertisements were damaging the reputation of Eesti Post and also "calling viewers up to violence against elderly people". SmartPosti responded that the claim was untrue and damaging reputation or calls for violence were not their intention.

== Sale to Itella Corporation ==
In July 2010, the Estonian Development Fund (majority shareholder in Smartpost) sold its share to the Finnish postal service and logistics company Itella. Raivo Vare, Head of the Estonian Development Fund commented on the sale, saying: "Risk investment is a field where there are few success stories, but Smartpost is definitely one of them. Sale of Smartpost is even better than it looks." The Estonian Development Fund reportedly earned €1.3 million from the sale of Smartpost.

Production and intellectual rights for the Delivery Point Solution remains in the hands of Cleveron, a separate entity from Smartpost.
