= List of World War II aces from France =

This is a list of fighter aces in World War II from France.

== A ==
- Paul Abrioux
- Jean-Marie Accart
- Marcel Albert
- Maurice Amarger
- Jacques André
- Jacques Andrieux
- Paul Audrain

== B ==
- Georges Baptizet
- Paul Bardin
- Emile Becquet
- Didier Beguin
- Georges Berland
- Andrien Bernavon
- Camille-Jean Bertrand
- Maurice Bissoudre
- Georges Blanck
- Pierre Bleton
- Pierre Boillot
- Hubert Boitelet
- Maurice Bon
- Michel Boudier
- Marcel Bouguen
- André Bouhy
- Guy Bouttier
- André Breitenstein
- Jérémie Bressieux

== C ==
- Yves Le Calvez
- Yves Carbon
- Jean Casenobe
- Noël Castelain
- Marc Castin
- Louis Castin
- Raymond Cazade
- René Challe
- Bernard Challe
- Maurice Challe
- Antoine de la Chapelle
- Charles Chesnais
- Raymond Clausse
- Pierre Clostermann
- Marcel Codet
- Edouard Corniglion-Molinier
- Germain Couteaud
- Joannes Cucumel
- Léon Cuffaut

== D ==
- Pierre Dechanet
- Louis Delfino
- André Delisle
- Jean Demozay
- André Deniau
- James Denis
- Henri Dietrich
- Michel Dorance
- Pierre Dorcy
- Kleber Doublet
- Jean Doudies
- Jean Dugoujon
- Bernard Duperier
- Albert Durand
- Roger Duval

== E ==
- Georges Elmlinger
- Paul Engler
- Dory Ellul a.k.a. "Little Thief"

== F ==
- Paul Faisandier
- Jean Fortin
- Henri Foucaud

== G ==
- Edgar Gagnaire
- Georges Garde
- Gabriel Gauthier
- Roger Gerard
- Jean Girou
- Justin Gisclon
- Pierre Le Gloan
- Robert G. Gouby
- Charles Goujon
- Jean Gourbeyre
- Georges Gras
- Henri Grimaud
- Michel Gruelle
- Abel Guides
- Régis Guieu
- Edmond Guillaume

== H ==
- Maurice-Marcel Hebrard
- Georges Henry
- Jean Hotelier
- Pierre Houze
- Henri Hugo
- Jean Hurtin
- Robert Huvet

== I ==
- Robert Iribarne

== J ==
- Gerard Jaussaud
- Henri Jeandet
- Marcel Jeannaud
- Jules Joire

== K ==
- Robert Killy
- Jan Klan
- Waclaw Krol

== L ==
- Georges Labit
- William Laboussiere
- Francois Lachaux
- Gaston Lacombe
- Jacques Lamblin
- André Lansoy
- Pierre Laureys
- Alphonse Maurice Leblanc
- Émile Leblanc
- Marcel Lefèvre
- Georges Lefol
- André Legentil
- André Legrand
- Georges Lemare
- Henri Liautard
- Albert Littolff
- Martin Loi
- Pierre Lorillon
- Camille Louis

== M ==
- Michel Madon
- Jean Manceau
- Jean Maridor
- Louis Marie
- René Lucien Martin
- Robert Martin
- Pierre Matras
- Gabriel Mertzisen
- Edmond Marin la Meslée
- Andre Micallef Grimaud
- Marie Hubert Monraisse
- Pierre Montet
- Amaury Montfort
- Paul de Montgolfier
- François Morel
- Antoine Moret
- Yves Mourier
- André Moynet
- Robert Marchi
- Gérard Muselli

== N ==
- André Naudy
- Jean Nedelec
- Edouard Le Nigen
- Eugenius Nowakiewicz

== O ==
- Leon Ougloff

== P ==
- René Panhard
- Labazordière Marie-Louis Papin
- Pierre Parent
- Marcel Parniere
- Amédée Passemard
- Raoul Patureau-Mirand
- Jean Paulhan
- Dominique Penzini
- Frantisek Perina
- Marcel Perrin
- Albert Petitjean-Roget
- Georges Pissotte
- Henri Planchard
- Camille Plubeau
- René Pomier-Layrargues
- Denis Ponteins
- Gérard Portalis
- Pierre Pouyade
- Roland de la Poype
- Jacques de Puybusque

== R ==
- Henri Raphenne
- Raoul Rebière
- Jean-Marie Rey
- Léon Richard
- Ernest Richardin
- Joseph Risso
- Jacques Robiaud
- René Roger
- Maurice Romey
- Marcel Rouquette
- René Rubin
- Georges Ruchoux

== S ==
- Hubert Irumberry de Salaberry
- Edouard Sales
- Pierre Salva
- Marie-Henri Satge
- Roger Saussol
- Jean Sauvage
- Roger Sauvage
- Reginald Sinclair
- Robert Starke
- Joseph Stehlik
- Marcel Steunou

== T ==
- Gaël Taburet
- Maurice Tallent
- Roger Teillet
- Georges Tesseraud
- Emile Thierry
- Robert Thollon
- Robert Tourne
- Georges Tricaud
- Aimé Troyes
- Jean-Louis Tulasne

== U ==
- Adolphe Vybiral

== V ==
- Georges Valentin
- Alois Vasatco
- Pierre Villaceque
- Pierre Villey
- Max Vinçotte
- Léon Vuillemain

== W ==
- Francois Warnier
- Robert Williame

== See also ==
- List of World War II aces by country
