= List of World War II aces from Czechoslovakia =

This is a list of World War II fighter aces from Czechoslovakia.

== Aces ==
Name	Kills	Awards	Notes
Bobek, Ladislav "Lada"	5		Died 14 February 1983
Čížek, Evžen	5		KIA 26 November 1940
Cukr, Venceslas (Vaclav) "Cooper"	9	Croix de Guerre with 4 palms (France), Médaille militaire (France), Légion d'honneur (France), DFC (UK).	Battle of France, Battle of Britain, and RAF Fighter Squadron Leader. Later RAF fighter test pilot. Died in New Zealand, 24 October 1989.
Doležal, František "Dolly"	6		KIA 4 October 1945
Dygrýn-Ligotický, Josef D	5		KIA 4 June 1942
Fechtner, Emil	5	DFC	KIA 29 October 1940
Fejfar, Stanislav B	8		KIA 17 May 1942
František, Josef	17	DFM	Czechoslovak Air Force until German occupation, then Polish Air Force. KIA 8 October 1940
Furst, Bohumil	6		
Hanuš, Josef Jan	5	DFC	
Janouch, Svatopluk	5		
Jícha, Václav	7	DFC	Died on 1 February 1945 when the aircraft in which he was a passenger crashed during a snowstorm.
Klán, Jan	5		Died 10 December 1986
Kratkoruky, Bedrich	5		MIA 15 January 1943
Kučera, Jiří V	5		
Kučera, Otmar	7	DFC	6 June 1995
Kuttelwascher, Karel Miroslav "Kut"	20	DFC, CdG	Czechoslovak Air Force until German occupation, then French Air Force, then Royal Air Force
Mansfeld, Miloslav	12	DSO, DFC, AFC	Died 22 October 1991
Peřina, František	12	CdG	Czechoslovak Air Force until German occupation, then French Air Force, then Royal Air Force
Plzak, Stanislav	6		MIA 7 August 1941
Prchal, Eduard M	6		Died 4 December 1984
Prihoda, Josef	5	DFC	MIA 6 March 1943
Půda, Rajmund	5		
Smik, Otto	13	DFC	KIA 28 November 1944
Šrom, Leopold	8		Died 11 October 1968
Stehlík, Josef	10		Died 30 May 1991
Svetlík, Ladislav	5		
Vašátko, Alois	14	DSO, DFC	Czechoslovak Air Force until German occupation, then French Air Force, then Royal Air Force. KIA 3 June 1942
Vybíral, Tomáš	7	DSO, DFC	Died 21 February 1981

== See also ==
- List of World War II aces by country
