= Peter Horn =

Peter Horn may refer to:

- Peter Horn (poet) (1934–2019), South African poet
- Peter Horn (pilot) (1915–1983), Danish fighter pilot
- Peter Horn (politician) (1891–1967), German politician
