= List of Vichy France flying aces =

This is a complete list of French flying aces who flew during the Second World War.

Sources
Name	Confirmed kills	Probable	Fate
Georges Blanck	12	1	
André Bouhy			
Jérémie Bressieux	9	0	
Paul Audrain			
Paul Abrioux	5	1	
Émile Becquet	5	0	
Joannès Cucumel			
Marie-Henri Satgé	5	0	
Paul de Montgolfier			
Jacques de Puybusque			
Georges Ruchoux			
Marcel Steunou	5	0	
Jean Dugoujon			
Roger Duval	8	2	
Jean Hurtin	6	0	
Georges Elmlinger	7	1	
Robert Huvet	7	1	
Marcel Jeannaud			
Robert Williame	8	1	
Paul Engler			
William Laboussiere			
François Lachaux			
Edouard le Nigen	12	1	
Alphonse Maurice Leblanc			
Émile Leblanc	7	1	
André Légrand			
Pierre Le Gloan	7		On 11 September 1943, flying for the Allies, Le Gloan died landing his P-39 Airacobra. In his complicated career, he shot down 4 German, 7 Italian, and 7 British aircraft.
Michel Madon	11 (Note: Kills credited as: 13 May 1940 – Bf 110 6 to 16 June 1940 – four Hs 126s, Do 17, Bf 109 confirmed and another Bf 109 and a He 111 as probables 8 November 1942 – two C-47s, and another probable, Sea Hurricane 26 November 1943 – probable Do 217 and two Fw 200s confirmed.)	4	Survived war, died 16 May 1972.
Jean Paulhan	7	1	
Gérard Portalis			
Léon Richard	7 (Note: Kills credited as: 8 June 1941 – Royal Navy Fairey Fulmar 9 June 1941 – Hawker Hurricane 13 June 1941 – No 11 Sqn Blenheim 23 June 1941 – Hurricane and a Tomahawk 5 July 1941 – Hurricane 18 May 1942 – Royal Navy Fulmar.)	0	Died in a training flight on 26 May 1943.
Marcel Rouquette	10	6	
Georges Valentin			
Léon Vuillemain	11	4	
Martin Loï	5	1	

== See also ==
- List of World War II aces from France
