= Lists of World War II flying aces =

Fighter aces in World War II had tremendously varying kill scores, affected as they were by many factors: the pilot's skill level, the performance of the airplane the pilot flew and the planes they flew against, how long they served, their opportunity to meet the enemy in the air (Allied to Axis disproportion), whether they were the formation's leader or a wingman, the standards their air service brought to the awarding of victory credits, and other factors.

Towards the end of the war, the Axis powers had largely exhausted their supply of skilled pilots and the replacements did not have as much opportunity to gain enough experience to be successful. Additionally, national policies differed; German, Italian, and Japanese pilots tended to return to the cockpit over and over again until they were killed. (Note: By 1945, combat experienced Japanese airmen were often detailed to provide fighter escort for newer inexperienced Kamikaze pilots en route to their targets in the Pacific)

It is not clear what impact each nation's rules for score crediting have on the counts listed below. Germans credited a shared victory to only one pilot, while the French credited full victory to all participants. British, Finnish and US air forces credited fractional shares of aerial victories, resulting in fractions, such as 11½, which might be for example 10 aircraft and three shares with the second pilot. Some U.S. commands also credited aircraft destroyed on the ground. The Soviets counted only solo kills, while group kills were counted separately, as did the Japanese. The Italian Air Force did not officially credit victories to individual pilots, but to their unit as a whole. Probable kills are usually left out of the list.

It is necessary to emphasize that the question of assessing and comparing the success rate of fighters by number of victories is one of the more problematic. There are disputes about what is "shot down" and what is "air victory", but the most problematic seems to be credibility of reports and reliability of its confirmation, which was substantially different in particular air forces. The most reliable is considered the confirmation of the victories in RAF, which based its counts on comparison of testimonials of participants and – if possible – film material.

== Aces ==
=== Gallery ===
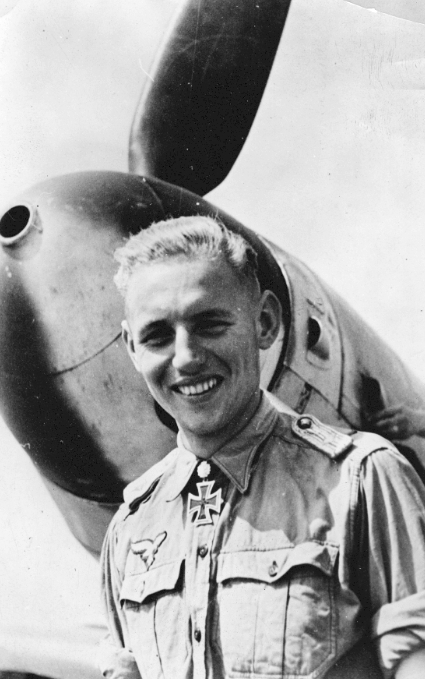
Erich Hartmann, the highest scoring German and all time ace

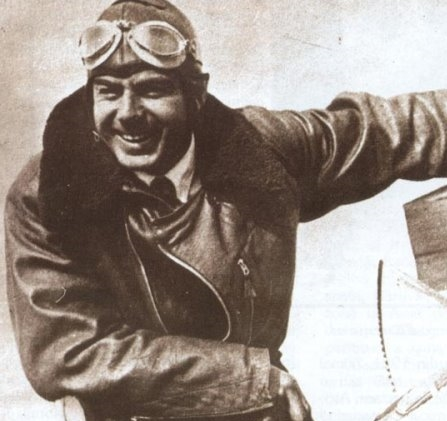
Constantin Cantacuzino, the highest scoring Romanian ace and the 3rd highest scoring ace of the European Axis powers

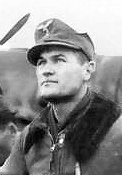
Mato Dukovac, the highest scoring Croatian ace

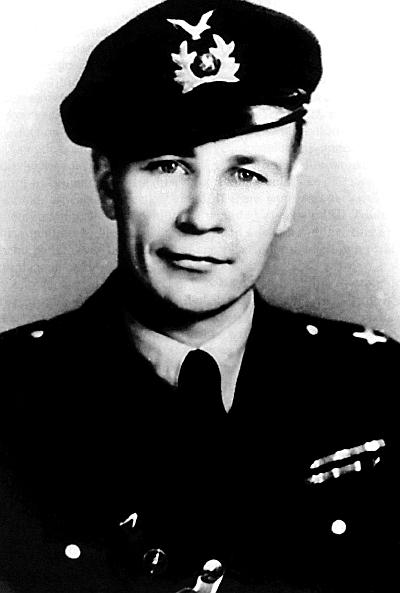
Ilmari Juutilainen, the top flying ace of the Finnish Air Force and the highest scoring non-German fighter pilot

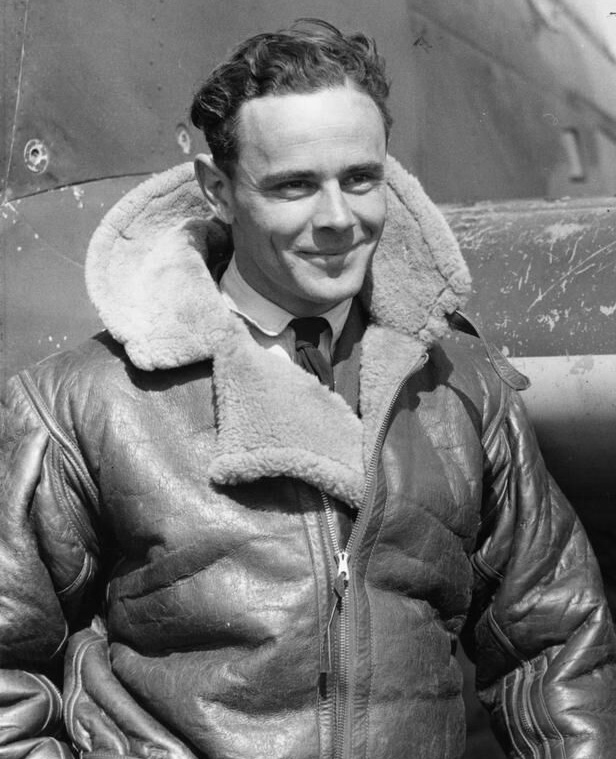
Marmaduke 'Pat' Pattle, the highest scoring British Commonwealth ace

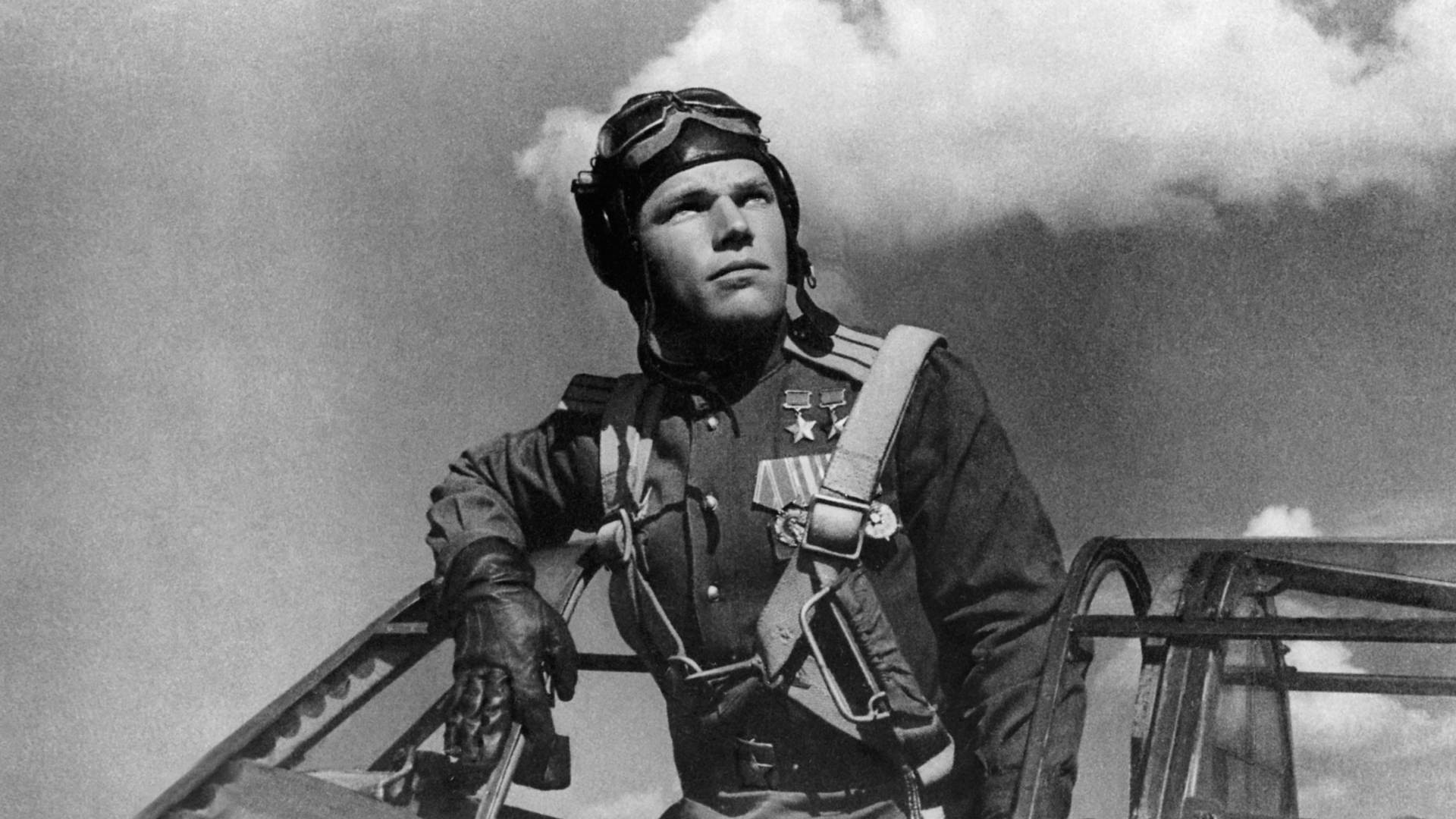
Ivan Kozhedub, the highest scoring Soviet and highest scoring Allied ace

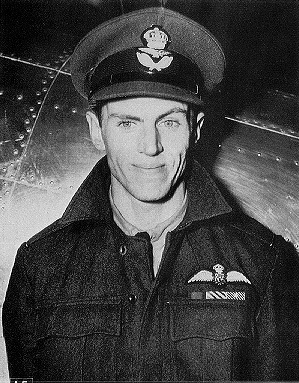
George Beurling, the highest scoring Canadian ace

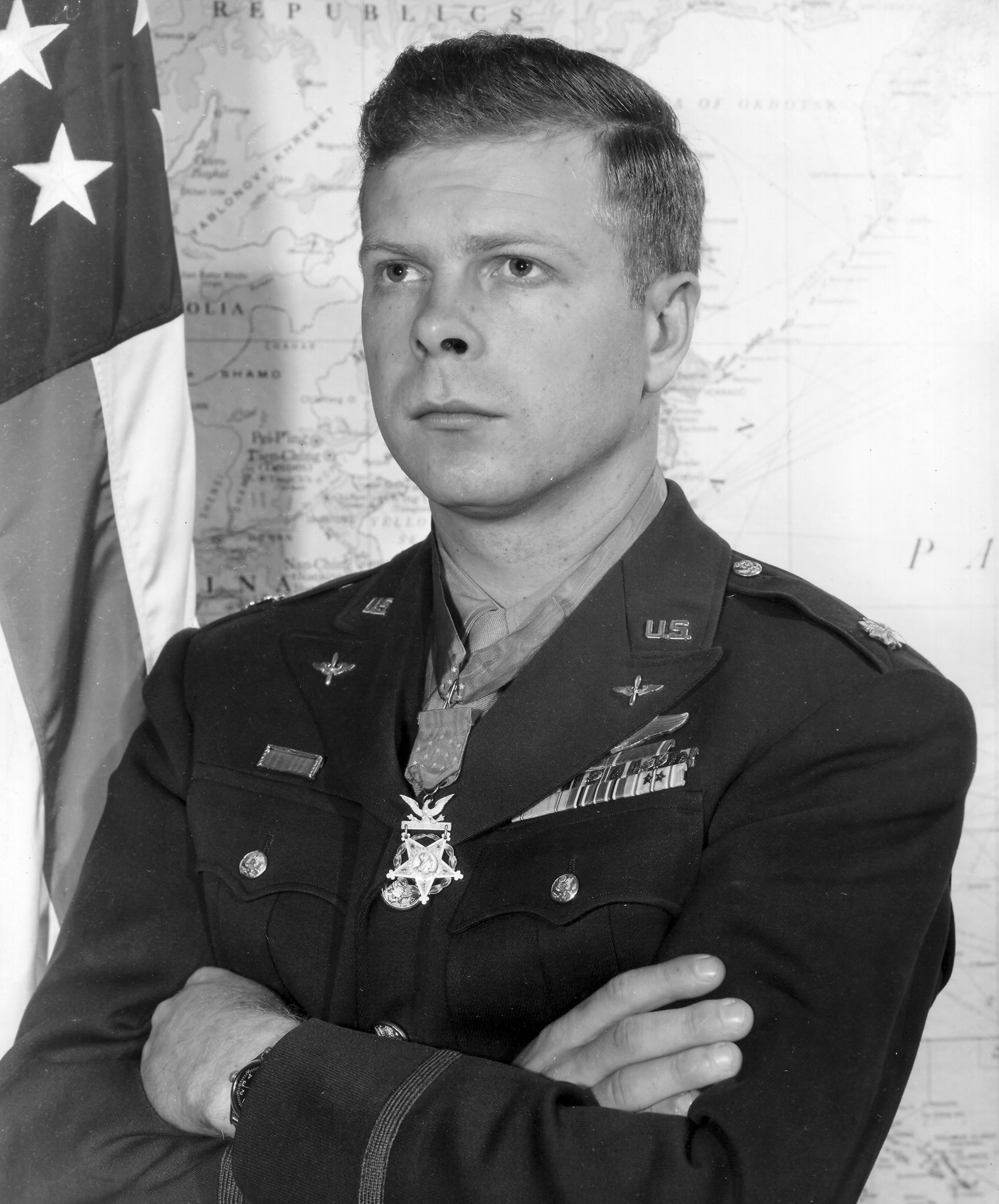
Richard Bong, the highest scoring US ace

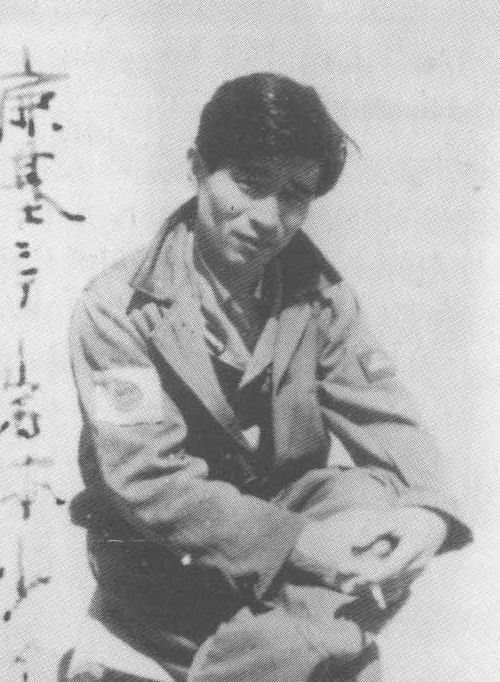
Tetsuzō Iwamoto, Japanese Navy fighter ace, often credited with being the top scoring Japanese ace

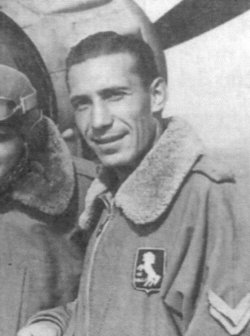
Teresio Vittorio Martinoli, the highest scoring Regia Aeronautica ace

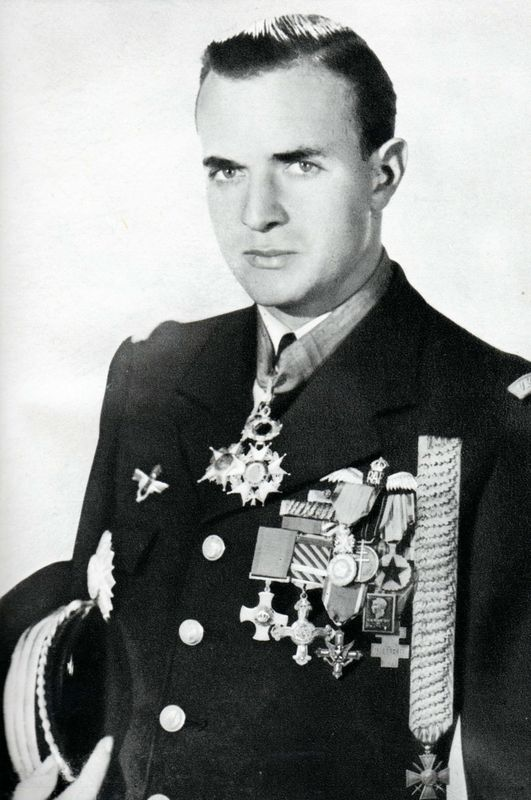
Pierre Clostermann, the highest scoring French ace

=== Aces ===
==== Australia ====
There were 103 air aces from Australia during the Second World War. For more information, see List of World War II aces from Australia.

==== Austria ====
There were 51 air aces from Austria (3 RAF and 48 Luftwaffe) during the Second World War. For more information, see List of World War II aces from Austria.

==== Belgium ====
There were 14 air aces from Belgium during the Second World War. For more information, see List of World War II aces from Belgium.

==== Bulgaria ====
Name	Kills	Awards	Notes
Bochev, Petar Angelov	5		
Stoyanov, Stoyan Iliev	5		

==== Canada ====
There were 152 air aces from Canada during the Second World War. For more information, see List of World War II aces from Canada.

==== China ====
There were more than 25 fighter aces from China during the Second World War, although not all flew for the Allies. For more information, see List of World War II aces from China.

==== Croatia ====
From 1941 to 1945, the portion of Yugoslavia occupied by the Axis powers existed as the Independent State of Croatia, a puppet state of Nazi Germany. There were 25 fighter aces from the Independent State of Croatia, fighting for the Axis, during the Second World War. See List of World War II aces from Croatia.

==== Czechoslovakia ====
There were more than 30 aces from Czechoslovakia during the Second World War. See List of World War II aces from Czechoslovakia and List of World War II aces from Slovakia.

==== Denmark ====
There were 3 fighter aces from Denmark during the Second World War. For further information, see List of World War II aces from Denmark.

==== Finland ====
There were 96 fighter aces from Finland during the Second World War. For further information, see List of World War II aces from Finland.

==== France ====
There were more than 180 aces from France during the Second World War. See List of World War II aces from France and List of Vichy France flying aces.

==== Germany ====
There were over 2,500 aces from Germany during the Second World War. For a detailed list of 890 (updated as of October 2017) of these aces, see List of World War II aces from Germany (Jet aces, night fighter).

==== Greece ====
There were 6 air aces from Greece during the Second World War.

==== Hungary ====
There were 39 air aces from Hungary during the Second World War. For further information, see List of World War II aces from Hungary.

==== Ireland ====
There were more than 13 aces from Ireland during the Second World War. See List of World War II aces from Ireland.

==== Italy ====
There were more than 166 aces from Italy during the Second World War. See List of World War II aces from Italy.

==== Japan ====
There were more than 475 aces from Japan during the Second World War. See List of World War II aces from Japan.

==== New Zealand ====
There were more than 80 aces from New Zealand during the Second World War. For a complete list, see List of World War II aces from New Zealand.

==== Norway ====
There were 20 aces from Norway during the Second World War. For a complete list, see List of World War II aces from Norway.

==== Philippines ====
There were only two known aces of the Philippines during the Second World War.

* Jesús A. Villamor

* César Basa

==== Poland ====
There were 91 air aces from Poland during the Second World War. For further information, see List of World War II aces from Poland.

==== Rhodesia ====
There were 11 air aces from Rhodesia during the Second World War. See List of World War II aces from Rhodesia.

==== Romania ====
There were 126 aces from Romania during the Second World War by Romanian 1944 standards. See List of World War II flying aces from Romania.

==== Slovakia ====
There were 19 air aces from Slovakia during the Second World War. See List of World War II aces from Slovakia and List of World War II aces from Czechoslovakia.

==== South Africa ====
There were 59 aces from South Africa during the Second World War. See List of World War II aces from South Africa.

==== Soviet Union ====
Soviet Union produced the highest scoring allied aces during the Second World War. See List of World War II aces from the Soviet Union.

==== Spain ====
There were 20 air aces from Spain during the Second World War, see List of World War II aces from Spain.

==== Sweden ====
- William Y. Anderson as a Swedish-American pilot flying with U.S. Army Air Forces. 7 kills (+ V-1 "flying bomb" on 17 June 1944).

==== United Kingdom ====
There are 753 aces listed from the United Kingdom during the Second World War.

==== United States ====
There were 1297 aces from the United States during the Second World War. See List of World War II aces from the United States.
