= Hody (Moravia) =

Traditional celebration held in the Czech Republic

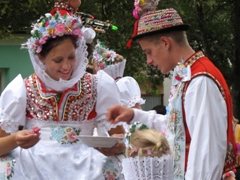
Stárek and starka at the Hody in Morkůvky, South Moravian Region

Hody (literally the Feasts) is an annual traditional celebration held in many villages and towns of historical land Moravia in the Czech Republic. The festivity is held from May to November in almost all villages and towns of the cultural region of Moravian Slovakia. The time of the celebration differs - each village or town has a church building dedicated to a particular patron saint and usually the nearest Sunday after the date of the saint's day is also the date for celebration of Hody.

The celebration usually takes place on Sunday and may last one or two more days. In the centre of the event stands a festive maypole (Czech: mája or májka) which is usually manually erected one day before the festivity. The maypole is often more than 30 metres tall, built from two or three spruce trees. It is erected with the help of ladders and crowbars. The maypole stands in the centre of a dancing place (in Czech: plac or sólo). People are dancing and singing around with the accompaniment of the brass music.

The main organizer and arranger of Hody is a selected young boy called první stárek (the first stárek - literally the first "old one"). He and a group of young friends (somewhere they are called stáreks - Czech plural: stárci; or they can be called chasa) are responsible for the organization and smooth running of the event. Each stárek (or member of chasa) also has a girl partner, usually called starka or stárka. The boys and girls wears a traditional folk costume, which differs widely from region to region.

At the beginning of Hody, a mayor of the village or town should pass symbolically the rule over to the first stárek.

== See also ==
- Gorolski Święto
