= Paul Sommer =

Paul Sommer may refer to:

- Paul Sommer (flying ace), List of World War II aces from Denmark
- Paul Sommer (filmmaker) of Color Rhapsodies etc.
- Paul Sommer, candidate in Kelston (New Zealand electorate)

== See also ==
- Paul van Somer
- Paul Summers (disambiguation)
