= List of World War II aces from Slovakia =

This is a list of fighter aces in World War II from Slovakia. For other countries see List of World War II aces by country.

== List ==
| Name | Kills | Awards | Notes |
|---|---|---|---|
| Božík, Rudolf "Rudo" | 12 | | |
| Brezina, František | 14 | | |
| Cyprich, František "Fero" | 15 | | |
| Drlička, Jozef | 6 | | |
| Dumbala, Ondrej | | | |
| Gerič, Alexander | 9 | | |
| Gerthofer, Ján | 26 | Iron Cross 1st Class, Victory Cross | |
| Hanovec, František | 7 | | |
| Jančovič, Jozef "Jožo" | 7 | | KIA 30 March 1943 |
| Kovárik, Izidor "Ižo" | 29 | | KIA 11 July 1944 |
| Kriško, Vladimír | 12 | | |
| Martiš, Štefan "Pišta" | 19 | | |
| Matúšek, Anton | 11 | | |
| Melichač, František | 5 | | |
| Ocvirk, Štefan | 10 | | |
| Palatický, Rudolf | 6 | | |
| Puškár, Juraj | 5 | | KIA 26 June 1944 |
| Režňák, Ján | 32 | | |
| Štauder, Jozef "Jožo" | 12 | | |
| Smik, Otto | 13 | RAF 5x CS war cross 1939, Croix de Guerre avec palme, DFC, The 1939 - 1945 Star, War Medal | KIA 22 November 1944 |
| Zeleňák, Pavol | 12 | | |
