= List of World War II aces from Croatia =

This is a list of fighter aces in World War II from the Independent State of Croatia, a puppet state of Nazi Germany from 1941–45, created in the portion of Yugoslavia occupied by the Axis powers. There were 25 fighter aces from the Independent State of Croatia, fighting for the Axis, during the Second World War. For other countries see List of World War II flying aces by country.

== A ==
Name	Rank	Total wartime victories	Unit	Notes
Vilim Acinger				Executed by Yugoslav Partisans in Slovenia in 1945.
Zdenko Avdić	Časnički namjesnik Sergeant Major	10		

== B ==
Name	Rank	Total wartime victories	Unit	Notes
Božidar Bartulović	Narednik; Sergeant	8		Sentenced to 15 years in jail in Federal People's Republic of Yugoslavia. Released in 1954.
Ljudevit Bencetić	Satnik; Captain	16		
Safet Boškić	Natporučnik; First Lieutenant	13		Nazi German Iron Cross 2nd Class

== C ==
- Mato Culinovic
- Zivko Culinovic

== D ==
- Mato Dukovac
- Eivko Dzhal (Zivko Dzal)
- Franjo Džal

== F ==
- Vladimir Ferencina

== G ==
- Cvitan Galić
- Dragutin Gazapi

== H ==
- Josip Hellebrant

== I ==
- Dragutin Ivanic

== J ==
- Josip Jelacic
- Ivan Jergovic

== K ==
- Tomislav Kauzlaric
- Josip Kranjc

== L ==
- Jure Lasta

== M ==
- Stjepan Martinashevic
- Eduard Martinko
- Veco Mikovic

== R ==
- Stjepan Radic

== S ==
- Albin Starc
- Zlatko Stipčić
