= Jan Klán =

Czech pilot (1911–1986)

Jan Klán Chevalier de France
- Born: 22 January 1911; Německý Brod, Austria-Hungary
- Died: 10 December 1986 (aged 75); Tucson, Arizona, United States
- Other name: John Kent
- Relatives: Vlasta Javořická (mother-in-law)
- Military career
- Rank: Colonel (posthumous)
- Commands: No. 312 (Czechoslovak) Squadron RAF
- Known for: Fighter ace
- Conflicts: World War II
- Awards: Legion of Honour; Croix de Guerre

Jan Klán (22 January 1911 – 10 December 1986) was a Czech fighter ace of World War II who achieved five aerial victories during the Battle of France. He later served as commander of No. 312 Squadron of the United Kingdom's Royal Air Force during the Battle of Britain, and as deputy commander of the 1st Czechoslovak Fighter Air Regiment during the Slovak National Uprising.

The son-in-law of the romance novelist Vlasta Javořická, Klán moved to the United States during the Cold War and anglicized his name to John Kent. He died in Tucson, Arizona.

== Early life ==
Jan Klán was born in Německý Brod and graduated from the military academy in Hranice. He entered service with the aviation corps of the Czechoslovak Army before transferring to the newly formed air wing of the Czechoslovak Gendarmerie.

Klán was engaged to Václava Zezulková—daughter of the popular Czech romance novelist Vlasta Javořická—in 1939, shortly before the dissolution of the First Czechoslovak Republic and the establishment of the German-administered Protectorate of Bohemia and Moravia.

== World War II ==
Klán left the Czech lands for Poland in May 1939 and, from there, to France where he briefly served in the French Foreign Legion before joining the Armée de l'air. Flying with the Groupe de Chasse II/5 La Fayette based at Toul-Croix de Metz Airfield, on 23 April 1940, Klán became the first Czech pilot to register an aerial victory against the Luftwaffe in the Hawk 75 and the first to down a Messerschmitt Bf 109. He became a fighter ace after achieving an additional four aerial victories during the Battle of France, for which he would be invested into the Legion of Honour at the rank of Chevalier (knight) and decorated with the Croix de Guerre.

A Hawk 75 in the livery of the Groupe de Chasse II/5, with which Klán served during the Battle of France

After the Fall of France, Klán made his way to the United Kingdom via French Algeria and volunteered with Czech and Slovak expatriates serving the Royal Air Force, briefly commanding No. 312 (Czechoslovak) Squadron RAF. He later moved to the USSR where he was made deputy commander of the Soviet-backed 1st Czechoslovak Fighter Air Regiment, which provided combat aviation support to insurgent forces during the Slovak National uprising.

== Later life ==
Following the conclusion of hostilities, Klán returned to the reconstituted Czechoslovakia. He married on 11 August 1945. In 1948, he was made lieutenant colonel and assigned as military attaché to the Czechoslovak embassy in the Soviet Union. He later returned to Czechoslovakia to take command of the Czechoslovak Army Air Command's České Budějovice Military Airfield.

Due to changing political conditions following the 1948 Czechoslovak coup d'état, Klán was dismissed from the armed forces in February 1949.

The following year, Klán and his family left Czechoslovakia, eventually settling in the United States where he anglicized his name to John Kent. As John Kent, Klán worked for a government services firm and, then, for Piper Aircraft as a sales manager variously posted to the company's offices in Brazil, Argentina, and Switzerland. (Note: According to a paid obituary in the Arizona Daily Star, Klán "served the United States government in sensitive positions in Europe and South America".) He retired to Tucson, Arizona, where he died.

In 1991, Klán was posthumously promoted to colonel by Czechoslovakia. An effort in the later 1990s by Czech aviation enthusiasts to have Klán posthumously invested into the Order of the White Lion was rejected by authorities of the Czech Republic.

== See also ==
- List of World War II aces from Czechoslovakia
