= Pierre Laureys =

French military officer, arms dealer and printer

- Born: 7 August 1919; Paris, France
- Died: 18 December 2004 (aged 85); Vallauris, France
- Other name: François Kennard
- Occupations: Flying ace, arms dealer

Captain Pierre François Laureys (7 August 1919 – 18 December 2004) was a French military officer, arms dealer and printer.

== Early life ==
Pierre Laureys was born on 7 August 1919 in the 14th arrondissement of Paris. He was the son of a photo engraver, and followed in the footsteps of his father after completing his secondary education. After World War II broke out in September 1939, Laureys enlisted in the French Air Force and trained as a pilot at a military aviation school in Vannes.

== World War II ==
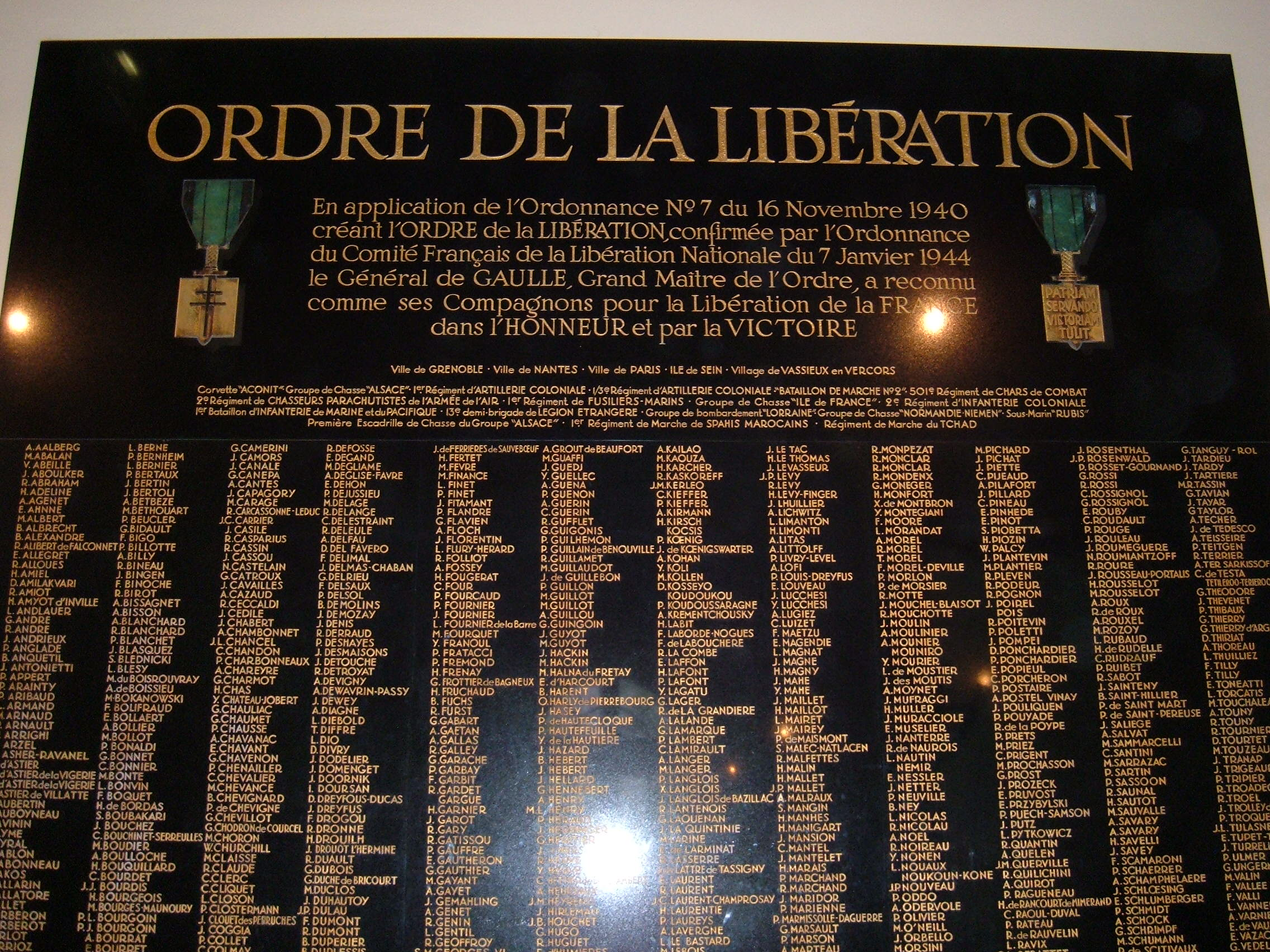
Roll of the members of the Ordre de la Libération at the Musée de l'Armée in Paris, which includes Laureys' name.

In June 1940, during the Battle of France, Laureys embarked on a boat transporting Polish Army troops to the United Kingdom at Saint-Jean-de-Luz. After arriving in Britain, he enlisted in the Free French Air Forces under the pseudonym of "François Kennard". In May 1942, he became a member of the No. 340 Squadron RAF, and during the Dieppe Raid of 19 August 1942, Laureys shot down two Dornier Do 217 planes of the Luftwaffe. After several more victories, he was promoted a Captain at the time of the Normandy landings.

== Later career ==
Laureys became a Companion of the Liberation and was demobilised in December 1945. He took up his previous profession as a photo-engraver and worked as a printer and editor of magazines such as Aviation Magazine International and L'Automobile Magazine. In Cyprus and Algeria, he was the head of press agency Air in 1956 and 1957. He would establish more than ten graphic arts enterprises, for example Presse aéronautique associée.

During the 1960s, Laureys became an arms dealer, providing aviation resources for several conflicts around the globe, but also for a Hollywood film. In one scene of the 1962 film The Longest Day, the makers needed some Supermarine Spitfire fighter aircraft. Laureys restored and provided three Spitfires, and flew one of the planes himself in the film.

During the Congo Crisis, several French officers and soldiers were enrolled at the Katangese armed forces of Moïse Tshombe's secessionist State of Katanga, including fellow Companion of the Liberation Edgard Tupët-Thomé, Roger Trinquier, and Roger Faulques. Laureys sold many items to Katanga, including North American P-51 Mustang aircraft.

During the North Yemen Civil War, Laureys shipped the first batch of arms to the mercenaries allied with the Royalists such as Bob Denard.

Finally, during the Nigerian Civil War, he sold two Douglas A-26 Invader aircraft to the mercenaries of the Biafran Air Force. One of them, registered under RB-26P, it was first sold to aerial survey company Société Carta by the Armée de l'Air in 1966, and last seen at Creil near Paris in June 1967. Then, it was sold by Laureys to Biafra, and flown to Biafra in August 1967 by two American pilots. Furthermore, he provided Biafra with Alouette helicopters, and pilots.

== Distinctions ==
- Commander of the Legion of Honour
- Companion of the Liberation (decree of 28 May 1945)
- Croix de Guerre 1939–1945
- Cross for Military Valour
- Escapees' Medal
- Commander of the Arts and Letters
- Distinguished Flying Cross (United Kingdom)
- Air Medal

== See also ==
- List of World War II aces from France
