= List of World War II aces from Hungary =

This is a list of fighter aces in World War II from Hungary. For other countries see List of World War II aces by country.

== B ==
Name	Kills	Awards	Notes
Bánlaky, György	7		KIA 6 November 1944
Bejczy, József	5		MIA 4 November 1944 (KIA, his body was recovered on 28 October 2005 near Abony, after a long search)
Boldizsár, László	5		
Buday, Lajos	9		KIA 17 April 1945

== D ==
Name	Kills	Awards	Notes
Dániel, László	10		
Debrődy, György "Debcsi"	25		

== F ==
Name	Kills	Awards	Notes
Fábián, István "Koponya"	17		
Flóznik, Ervin	5		KIA 15 January 1944
Forró, Pál	5		
Füleky, Béla	5		KIA 4 April 1945

== H ==
Name	Kills	Awards	Notes
Hautzinger, Sándor	5		
Lt Col Heppes, Aladár	8		

== I ==
Name	Kills	Awards	Notes
1st Lt Irányi, Pál	7		

== K ==
Name	Kills	Awards	Notes
Kálmán, István	12		
Karátsonyi, Mihály	5		
Kenyeres, Miklós	19		
Kiss, Ernő	6		
Kovács, Pál	6		KIA 22 August 1944

== L ==
Name	Kills	Awards	Notes
Lőrincz, Mátyás	5		KIA 5 November 1944

== M ==
Name	Kills	Awards	Notes
Málik, József	11		KIA 16 April 1945
Málnásy, Ferenc	11		KIA 13 March 1945
Máthé, László	10		
Mátyás, János	5		
Michna, György	6		
Molnár, László	26		KIA 4 February 1945

== N ==
Name	Kills	Awards	Notes
Nagy, Jozsef	6		
Nánási, Kálmán Laszló	9		KIA 4 April 1945
Német, Endre	8		

== P ==
Name	Kills	Awards	Notes
Pánczél, Imre	7	Iron Cross 2nd class, Hungarian Knight's Cross with swords	First Hungarian ace of World War II, KIA 11 January 1943
Papp, Tibor	5		
Pottyondy, László	13		

== R ==
Name	Kills	Awards	Notes
Róza, János	5		

== S ==
Name	Kills	Awards	Notes
Szentgyörgyi, Dezső	30		6 unconfirmed
Szeverényi Kálmán	5		DOW 22 February 1945
Szikora, László Pál	6		

== T ==
Name	Kills	Awards	Notes
Tobak, Tibor	4		
Tóth, Lajos	28		

== U ==
Name	Kills	Awards	Notes
Újszászy, György István "Apuka"	8		
