= Pierre Boillot =

French World War II flying ace

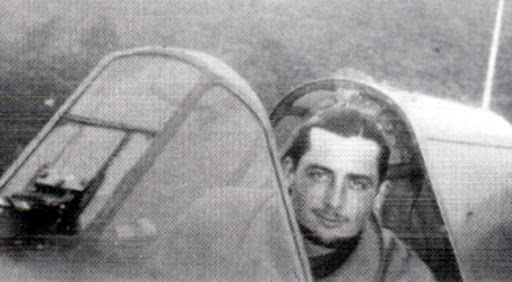
- Born: 22 June 1918; Laissey, France
- Died: 1 September 1994 (aged 76); Paris, France
- Burial place: Fontenay-le-Fleury
- Military career
- Allegiance: France
- Branch: Free French Air Force; Royal Air Force
- Service years: 1938–1969
- Rank: Colonel
- Units: No. 326 Squadron RAF; 4e Escadre de Chasse
- Known for: Aviator, flying ace
- Conflicts: World War II
- Awards: Croix de Guerre

Pierre Boillot (22 June 1918 – 1 September 1994) was a French World War II flying ace attributed with 13 confirmed victories.

== Early life ==
Born on June 22, 1918, in Laissey, Pierre became a career airman and obtained his brevet or piloting license on June 7, 1938 and was assigned to the 4th escadrille GC.II/7 in May 1939 at the Luxeuil air base.

== World War II ==
As soon as war was declared in September 1939, he participated in operations to protect reconnaissance aircraft above the operational zone extending along the banks of the Rhine, from Rhinau to Basel. At the controls of an MS.406, he experienced his first aerial combat against a Dornier Do 17, in November 1939 but did not until obtain his first confirmed victory until the morning of April 20, 1940, which was against a Bf.109E of 2/JG.54 above Belfort. Then came the German offensive on May 10, 1940, and the fights are increasing (with reduced prior training for French pilots and non-existent means of radio communication between planes except for the squadron leader who can only communicate with a radio car on the ground and only within a radius of 80 km):

- May 10, 1940: he shot down, in cooperation, a Heinkel He 111.
- May 11, 1940: in the region of Luxeuil-les-Bains, he was hit in aerial combat. He lands his aircraft but is targeted by friendly DCA who believe it is a German plane. He was recovered by friendly troops but his MS 406 was not recoverable.
- May 11, 1940: he shoots down a Junkers Ju 88 which was counted as a probable victory.
- June 1940: he is attributed with shooting down a Heinkel He 111 and a Dornier Do 17.

Coming out of the Battle of France as an ace, the GC.II/7 was repatriated to Tunisia and re-equipped with D.520s. After the Anglo-American landing in North Africa (November 1942), he returned to service alongside the allied troops but his unit was confined to maritime convoy escort and coastal surveillance missions, but that did not prevent the young chief sergeant, now flying a Spitfire Mk.V, to obtain 2 victories against Ju 88s (October 10, October 30, 1943). In September 1943, his unit, renamed GC.II/7N, was based in Corsica, where, as of August 1944, he participated in the Allied landings in Provence. Meanwhile, as he was promoted to officer, Pierre fought successively in the Rhône valley, the Vosges and German territory, obtaining 4 new confirmed victories during the winter of 1944 and the spring of 1945, in this case 4 Bf.109s (NB. October 3, October 8, December 24, 1944, and March 18, 1945).

== Later life ==
With the Second World War over, he decided to continue his career in the Air Force. He commanded the 4e Escadre de Chasse in 1952, and in 1964, he commanded the Romilly air base and sees further active service in Algeria. He ended his career at the 2nd CATAC in Nancy. He was "mark officer of experimental prototypes" (date unknown). He ended his military career as a colonel in 1969. He was then hired by Dassault and retired in 1983.
