= List of World War II aces from Denmark =

This is a list of fighter aces in World War II from Denmark.

| Name | Kills | Awards | Notes |
|---|---|---|---|
| Kaj Birksted | 10 | DSO DFC | |
| Peter Horn | 11 | | |
| Paul Sommer | 5 | | |

== See also ==
- List of World War II aces by country
