= Edmond Marin la Meslée =

French fighter pilot

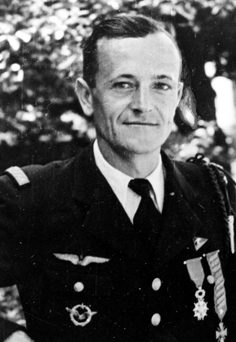

Edmond Marin la Meslée (5 February 1912 – 4 February 1945) was a French fighter pilot in World War II. 5th highest-scoring French ace of the conflict with 16 aerial victories, he was the most successful French air ace of the French campaign with sixteen confirmed (and four probable) air victories between January and June 1940. Roland Dorgelès presented him as the "Guynemer of the 1939-1945 war".

== Biography ==
Edmond Marin la Meslée was born on February 5, 1912, in Valenciennes, France. After studying law, he took government-subsidized flying lessons at the Morane flight school and gained his license in 1931. At 19, he entered the French Air Force and, after graduating from the school at Istres, was assigned to a unit in Strasbourg. At the end of his two-year tour, he re-enlisted for another two years, despite having to serve at a lower rank.

In October 1937, he was admitted to the Air Force Academy and graduated with the rank of 2nd Lieutenant. He was assigned to the GC I/5 fighter group (Reims), to fly one of its 32 Curtiss H-75 fighters. Groupe de chasse are French fighter units approximately equivalent to a two-squadron wing in the British RAF. There he was taught by Jean Accart, who thought highly of his potential as a fighter pilot.

During the Battle of France, Marin la Meslée distinguished himself by shooting down 16 "certain" German aircraft, although some sources credit him with as many as 20 including his 4 "probable" ones. On June 1, his leader was wounded and "Marin" replaced him at the head of the first escadrille (approx. a squadron of 12 fighters) of GC I/5.

After the armistice, GC I/5 was evacuated to Saint-Denis-du-Sig and later to Rabat, Morocco, but did not see much action against the British.

After Operation Torch, French forces in North Africa joined the Allied forces, and Marin la Meslée's unit left for Tafaraoui, Algeria in September 1943 to receive American equipment that eventually materialized as P-39 Airacobras.

Marin la Meslée was promoted as CO of his unit, then renamed GC 1/5 "Champagne", on January 9, 1944. The group went back to combat on September 30, 1944, operating from Salon-de-Provence in support of the French and Allied forces pursuing the Germans along the Rhône River, flying mostly ground support missions.

On February 4, 1945, near Colmar, Edmond Marin la Meslée was shot down during a strafing attack when his Republic P-47 Thunderbolt suffered a direct hit from a 40 mm anti-aircraft shell (German "Flak"). His aircraft exploded in the crash but his body was nevertheless recovered by the Germans. He had received a piece of shrapnel in the head, and had probably died even before the crash.

On February 14, 1953, his name was given to the Reims - Champagne Air Base.

== List of credited aerial victories ==
1. 11 January 1940; Do 17; Longwy
2. 12 May 1940; Ju 87; Bouillon
(Likely belonging to Heinz Migeod of II./St.G 76

3. 12 May 1940; Ju 87; Pouru St-Rémy
4. 12 May 1940; Ju 87; Sainte-Cécile
5. 13 May 1940; Bf 109; Stonne
6. 15 May 1940; Hs 126; Vendresse
7. 16 May 1940; Do 215; Rethel
8. 18 May 1940; He 111; Rethel
9. 18 May 1940; He 111; Ponsart
10. 18 May 1940; He 111; Laon
11. 19 May 1940; He 111; Hesse
12. 24 May 1940; Hs 126; Saint-Loup-au-Terrier
13. 25 May 1940; Hs 126; Boult-aux-Bois
14. 26 May 1940; He 111; Tannay
15. 3 June 1940; Hs 126; Sommauthe
16. 10 June 1940; Ju 88; Châtillon-sur-Bar

== Awards ==
- Légion d’honneur;
- Croix de Guerre (avec onze palmes);
- Distinguished Flying Cross

== Bibliography ==
- Ledet, Michel (December 1998). "Edmond Marin La Meslée, as des as français de la campagne de 1940" [Edmond Marin La Meslée, Ace of French Aces of the Campaign of 1940]. Avions: Toute l'aéronautique et son histoire (in French) (69): 12–17. ISSN 1243-8650.
