= Paul Summers (disambiguation) =

Paul Summers, Attorney General of Tennessee, U.S.A.

Paul Summers may also refer to:

- Paul Summers, fictional character in Far Cry (film)
- Paul Summers, character in The Doctors (1963 TV series)

== See also ==
- Paul Somers, pseudonym of the crime novelist, Paul Winterton
- Paul Sommer (disambiguation)
