= List of World War II aces from Southern Rhodesia =

This is a list of fighter aces in World War II from Southern Rhodesia. For other countries see List of World War II aces by country

Name	Kills	Notes
Neville Bowker	11	Prisoner of war DFC in 1941
George Andrew F. "Buck" Buchanan	7	DFC Mostly defending Malta.
John Howard Deall	5	OBE, DSO, DFC, Vliegerkruis
Eric Sidney "Dicky" Dicks-Sherwood	7	
Frank Holman	9	
Caesar Barrand Hull	8	DFC Joined RAF in 1936. Most successful pilot of Norwegian campaign. Killed in action on 7 September 1940
William Ivan Hartley Maguire	13	
Percy Arthur "Ping" Newton	5	
Ioannis Agorastos "John" Plagis	16	Born and brought up in Rhodesia of Greek descent; joined the Royal Air Force as a Greek citizen, not holding British nationality.
Perry Robert St Quintin	9	
Ernest Leopold Williams	9	

== See also ==
- Southern Rhodesia in World War II

== Notes and references ==
Notes
