= Vlasta Javořická =

Czech writer (1890–1979)

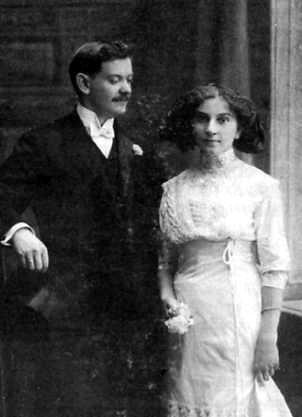
Vlasta Javořická (1890-1979)

Marie Barešová (25 March 1890 – 1 August 1979), known by the pen name Vlasta Javořická, was a Czech romance novelist. The author of more than 100 works, she has been described as the most popular writer of her genre in the interwar Czechoslovakia.

Barešová was the mother-in-law of the fighter ace Jan Klán.
