= List of World War II aces from Ireland =

This is a list of flying aces in World War II from Ireland. For other countries see List of World War II aces by country.

== Aces ==
- Victor Beamish (1903–1942 †) RAF No. 16089
- John Martin Bruen (1910–1967) Fleet Air Arm 5 801, 759, 803, 778, 800 & 836Sq
- Brendan Eamonn Fergus Finucane (1920–1942 †) RAF No.13 No.65 & No.602 Sqn, Hornchurch Wing; RCAF No.19 & No.452 Sqn; KIA 15/Jul/1942
- John Ignatus Kilmartin (1913–1998) RAF 12.33 1, 43, 602, 313, 128 & 504Sq, Hornchurch Wing, 136 Wing, 910 Wing
- James Reginald Bryan Meaker (1919–1940) RAF 8 46, 263 & 249Sq; KIA 27/Sep/1940
- Rupert Frederick Smythe (1916–1980) RAF 6 29, 504 & 32Sq
- Robert Wilkinson Turkington (1920–1945) RAF 9.16 124, 611, 43, 72, 241 & 601Sq; KIFA Apr/1945
- William Joseph "Timber" Woods DFC (1913–1941 †) RAF no. 39605
