= Bedřich Reicin =

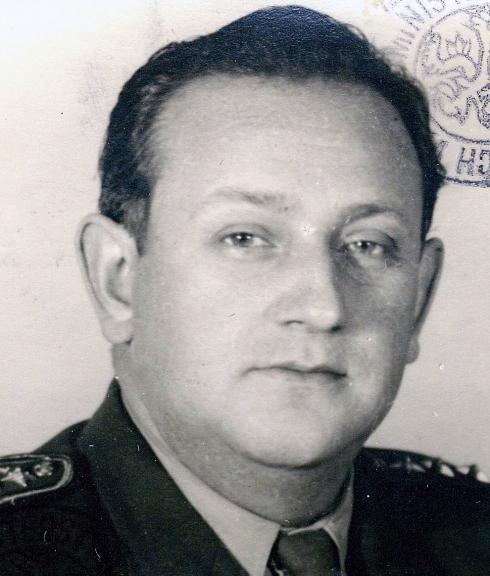
- Born: Friedrich Reinzinger; September 29, 1911; Přerov, Kingdom of Bohemia, Cisleithania
- Died: December 3, 1952 (aged 41); Pankrác Prison, Prague, Czechoslovak Republic
- Known for: Defendant in the Slánský trial
- Political party: KSČ
- Active combat
- Allegiance: Czechoslovak government-in-exile
- Branch: Red Army
- Rank: Head of counter-intelligence
- Unit: 1st Czechoslovak Army Corps
- Conflict: WWII

Bedřich Reicin (29 September 1911 – 3 December 1952) was a Czech politician and army officer of the Czechoslovak Army.

== Biography ==
Reicin was born on 29 September 1911 in Přerov. He was born into a poor Jewish family (his birth name was Friedrich Reinzinger, sometimes written as Reicinger). He first studied at a gymnasium, and later at a business college from which he was expelled after discovery of his activism for the communist party. In the 1930s, Reicin became a functionary of a communist youth organization and contributor of the party newspaper Rudé právo. After the occupation of Czechoslovakia by Nazi Germany in 1939, he was imprisoned by the Gestapo. He was released after seven months and, in 1940, he managed to flee into the Soviet Union. There he worked as a radio propagandist. After the attack by Germany on Soviet Union, he was interned (as were many people having Protectorate of Bohemia and Moravia citizenship). In February 1942, he joined the newly formed First Czechoslovak Army Corps and soon became a propaganda officer there. In 1945, Reicin was named the head of the counter-intelligence service of the Corps, a role he reprised after the war. Between 1948 and 1951, Reicin served as the Deputy Minister of Defense, responsible for army personnel management. In 1948, he obtained the rank of brigadier general, and in 1950 the rank of divisional general.

During and after the war, Reicin always promoted interests of the communist party in the army. After February 1948, he organized mass purges of officers who were felt to not be loyal enough to the new regime (including flying ace František Peřina). His behind-the-scene work made him very powerful in the military and political hierarchy. Alexej Čepička, who had been the Minister of Defense since 1950, felt threatened by Reicin and conspired against him. In February 1951, Reicin and many of his coworkers were imprisoned. Reicin was selected for participation in the Slánský Trial, and for year and half was prepared and tortured to fit the role. One of the accusations was handing Julius Fučík (a communist journalist) over to the Gestapo, a technical impossibility since Reicin was already in the Soviet Union at this time. At the Slánský Trial, Reicin and ten others were sentenced to death and hanged at Pankrác Prison in Prague. He died on 3 December 1952.
