= Morkůvky =

- Municipality
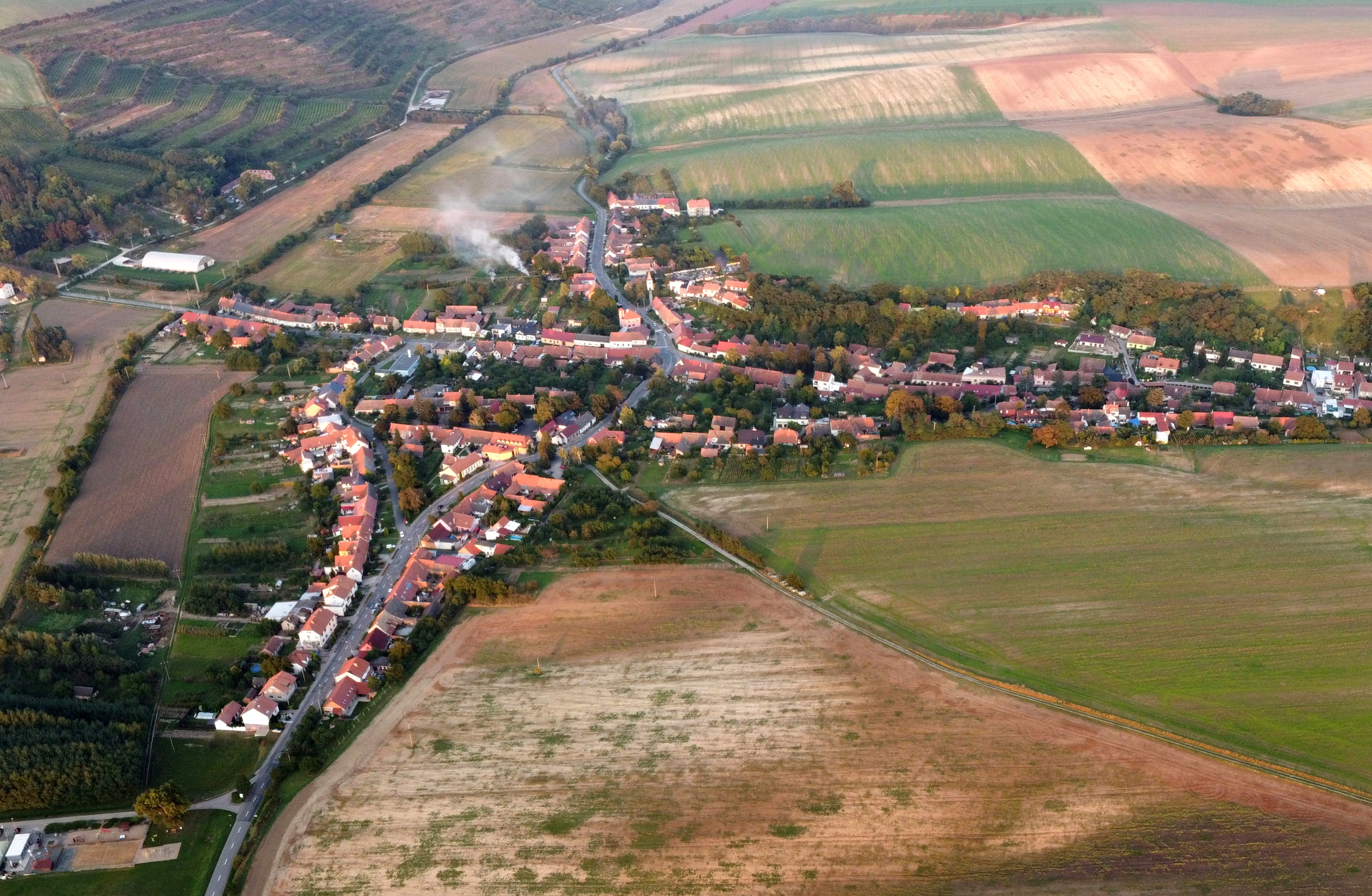
- View from the west

- Flag Coat of arms

- Location in the Czech Republic
- Coordinates: 48°57′58″N 16°51′44″E
- Country: Czech Republic
- Region: South Moravian
- District: Břeclav
- First mentioned: 1356

Area
  - Total: 6.75 km^{2} (2.61 sq mi)
- Elevation: 198 m (650 ft)

Population (2026-01-01)
  - Total: 524
  - Density: 77.6/km^{2} (201/sq mi)
- Time zone: UTC+1 (CET)
  - Summer (DST): UTC+2 (CEST)
- Postal code: 691 72
- Website: www.morkuvky.cz

Morkůvky is municipality and village in Břeclav District in the South Moravian Region of the Czech Republic. It has about 500 inhabitants.

Morkůvky lies approximately 23 kilometres (14 mi) north of Břeclav, 32 km (20 mi) south-east of Brno, and 216 km (134 mi) south-east of Prague.

== Demographics ==
Historical population
Year	Pop.	±%
1869	634	—
1880	660	+4.1%
1890	731	+10.8%
1900	803	+9.8%
1910	766	−4.6%
1921	811	+5.9%
1930	782	−3.6%
1950	609	−22.1%
1961	646	+6.1%
1970	568	−12.1%
1980	484	−14.8%
1991	436	−9.9%
2001	458	+5.0%
2011	432	−5.7%
2021	473	+9.5%
Source: Censuses

== Notable people ==
- František Peřina (1911–2006), fighter pilot
