= Robert Williame =

French WWII fighter ace

- Born: 24 February 1911; Saint-Martin-Boulogne, France
- Died: 31 October 1940 (aged 29); Salon-de-Provence, France
- Military career
- Allegiance: France
- Branch: Armée de l'air
- Service years: 1930–1940
- Rank: Captain
- Unit: GC III/6
- Commands: 6ème escadrille, GC III/6
- Conflicts: World War II: Battle of France

Robert Williame (24 February 1911 – 31 October 1940) was a French aviator and World War II flying ace.

== Background ==
Robert Williame was born in Saint-Martin-Boulogne on 24 February 1911 and was admitted to the École spéciale militaire de Saint-Cyr (Saint-Cyr Military Academy) in 1930. He opted for the Armée de l'air (French Air Force) upon his graduation two years later. Williame received his pilot's license in 1933 and was assigned to the 1ère escadrille, GC I/2 (1st Flight, Fighter Group I/2 (nicknamed Cicognes (Storks))) in 1935. He graduated from a parachuting instructor course in 1934 and was promoted to captain in September 1938. His unit was equipped with Morane-Saulnier MS.406 fighters in May 1939.

== World War II ==
During the Phony War, he claimed a German Dornier Do 17 bomber as probably destroyed on 7 March 1940. After the Germans invaded France on 10 May, ending the Phony War, he shot down a pair of Junkers Ju 88 bombers on 5 June. Three days later he shot down three Messerschmitt Bf 109 fighters that were escorting a formation of bombers. Later that day, he shot down a trio of Junkers Ju 87 "Stuka" dive bombers.

After the Armistice of 22 June, GC I/2 was disbanded and Williame was transferred to GC III/6, which was flying Bloch MB.152 fighters for the Vichy regime. There he became commander of its 6ème escadrille and died in a crash while training near Salon-de-Provence on 31 October.

== Bibliography ==
- Philippe, Bernard (October 2000). "Robert Williame: l'autre héros légendaire des Cigognes" [Robert Williame: The Other Legendary Hero of the Storks]. Avions: Toute l'Aéronautique et son histoire (in French) (91): 8–19. ISSN 1243-8650.
