= Amaury Montfort =

French flying ace

- Born: Amaury Robert Roger Montfort; 16 January 1915; Meknes, French Morocco
- Died: 2 December 1999 (aged 84)
- Military career
- Allegiance: France
- Branch: French Air Force
- Service years: 1936–1966
- Conflicts: World War II

Amaury Montfort (16 January 1915 – 2 December 1999) was a French flying ace of World War II.

== Bibliography ==
- Coste, Alain (January–February 2020). "Amaury Montfort, l'as inconnu du GC II/1" [Amaury Montfort, the Unknown Ace of Fighter Group II/1]. Avions (in French) (233): 8–28. ISSN 1243-8650.
