= František Peřina =

Czech pilot (1911–2006)

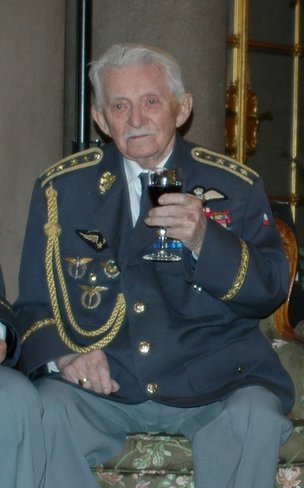
- Born: 8 April 1911; Morkůvky, Moravia, Austria-Hungary
- Died: 6 May 2006 (aged 95); Prague, Czech Republic
- Military career
- Allegiance: Czechoslovakia; France; United Kingdom; Czech Republic
- Branch: Czechoslovak Air Force; Armée de l'Air; Royal Air Force
- Service years: 1929–1953
- Rank: Rotmistr; Adjutant; Wing Commander; Lieutenant General (Retired)
- Nickname: François Renopé
- Conflicts: Battle of Britain
- Awards: Croix de Guerre; Chévalier de la Légion d'Honneur
- Other work: Weber Aircraft, Burbank, California

Wing Commander General František Peřina (8 April 1911 – 6 May 2006) was a Czech fighter pilot, an ace during World War II with the French Armée de l'Air, who also served twice with Britain's Royal Air Force.

== Biography ==
František Peřina was born on 8 April 1911 in Morkůvky, Moravia, Austria-Hungary. He was born into a farming family. He undertook a full primary school education, before serving an apprenticeship as a machinist. Six months after qualifying he joined the Czechoslovak Air Force.

=== Czechoslovak Air Force ===
Reporting to Prostějov airfield on 1 October 1929 after undertaking army officer training, he trained to fly the Letov Š-10 (nicknamed "Sardinka" /sardine/ by pilots), the Letov Š-14 and the Letov Š-18 "Komár" (mosquito). Graduating in 1931 he spent two years as a first class airman before promotion to Sergeant. In 1932 he attended fighter school in Cheb, training for four months in air-to-air and air-to-ground gunnery and aerobatics on various biplane and single wing fighters. He returned to his unit and was then attached to the 34th fighter squadron at Olomouc on Letov Š-20 biplanes.

In 1937, Peřina represented the Czechoslovak air force at the International Air Show in Zurich, Switzerland in an Avia B-534. There he met the German contingent headed by World War I ace Ernst Udet, the then chief of the Luftwaffe's office of supply and procurement, and Erhard Milch, second-in-command of the Luftwaffe. The German team were equipped with the Heinkel He 51 and the new Messerschmitt Bf 109. Peřina took third place in both aerobatics and in the climb-and-dive competition, and fourth in the cross-country flight: behind the German pilots.

The 34th fighter squadron was then transferred, and Peřina transferred to the 36th Fighter Squadron when it was rotated to the airfield with reconnaissance pilot Josef František, staying with them through the 1938 German occupation of Czechoslovakia. He was then posted to military school to serve as rotmistr (warrant officer), and in the aftermath of the Sudeten Crisis the Czechoslovak air force began to form new squadrons and he joined the 52nd Fighter Squadron.

After a border war with Hungary, he married Anna Klimešová on 24 June 1939 and left for Poland without his wife on 26 June (she was delayed through paperwork), with the intention of joining the French Foreign Legion in North Africa.

=== Armée de l'Air ===
After the first dissolution of Czechoslovakia and the annexation of Bohemia and Moravia by Nazi Germany, and after Germany invaded Poland in September 1939, France declared war on Germany. The Czechoslovak government-in-exile obtained an agreement from the French Government for Czechoslovak airmen to be transferred from the Foreign Legion to the Armée de l'Air.

Initiated at Châtres, Seine-et-Marne, Peřina flew a Curtiss H-75A. On 1 December 1939 Peřina was assigned to the 1ère Escadrille of Groupe de Chasse I, Escadre de Chasse 5 based at Suippes near Reims. The squadron was made up of French pilots who had attended the Zurich air festival, and commanded by Capitaine Jean Accart. His took on the French alias of François Rinopé, in case he was taken prisoner – the Germans would treat a French prisoner much better than they would an exiled Czech.

On operations after 10 May 1940, after Germany began implementing its Manstein battle plan against France, the Netherlands, and Belgium, Peřina shot down four planes in two sorties. He was also promoted to sergent-chef. The next day he shot down his fifth, thus becoming the first Czech ace in the Second World War. A day after that he shot down two more planes. Promoted to Adjutant, he became well known throughout France through media coverage of his exploits.

Peřina's squadron moved to Saint-Dizier on the Marne River on 14 May. In June 1940 as the Luftwaffe focused on Paris, Peřina and colleagues attacked a bombing formation. While his colleagues attacked the bombers Peřina focused on a fighter escort of 60 Messerschmitt Bf 109's, shooting down one plane but getting badly shot up himself. In interview on his 95th birthday, he recalled:

I had to gain them some time, and I could think of nothing other than to attack. I had to stop them somehow. I distracted them, and I even managed to shoot one down, but then I myself was hit. My plane took 15 cannon hits, 80 by machine gun. My leg and my arm were injured, although I didn't feel a thing. I knew I probably wasn't going to make it back.

After being hospitalised in Coulommiers he left the hospital and escaped to Paris and then Chartres. He then joined GC I/5 at Carcassonne, retrieving a Curtiss with a flat tailwheel tire from another airfield and flying to join the Free French Forces in Saint-Denis-du-Sig airfield located near Oran, Algeria. Having been awarded but never received the customary Croix de Guerre for his first air-to-air victory, the Free French decorated Peřina as a Chévalier de la Légion d'Honneur and also awarded him the Croix de Guerre with six palms. He then travelled by train to Casablanca where he boarded a ship to Britain.

=== Royal Air Force ===
After a 29-day boat trip, Peřina was allocated to No. 312 (Czechoslovak) Squadron RAF, flying Hawker Hurricanes. He saw little action before suffering from acute appendicitis and was treated at hospital in Ely, Cambridgeshire. He returned to No. 312 on recovery and moved with the squadron to Ayr, Scotland in 1941 to convert to the Supermarine Spitfire Mk V.

On 3 June 1942 while escorting bombers he claimed two Focke-Wulf Fw 190s from a formation of four, one of which was confirmed destroyed and a second as 'probable'. Peřina then served as sector gunnery officer for a year, and then spent the remainder of the war at Fighter Command as part of the Czechoslovak liaison establishment.

His victory claims totalled 12, and consisted of 3 solo and 9 shared destroyed, 2 probables, and 1 damaged

=== Returned to Czechoslovakia ===
Peřina returned to Czechoslovakia where his wife Anna had been imprisoned from 1942 to 1945. He became the Commanding Officer of a gunnery school and an aerobatic pilot with his own Bücker Bü 131 "Jungmeister" biplane provided by the air ministry. However, as the communists took power and the Cold War developed there was a questioning of the loyalty of those 'westernised' pilots who had served with the Allies. In December 1949 after an argument with Bedřich Reicin, Peřina was expelled from the army and forced to flee. In April 1949 Peřina, his wife Anna and a friend flew to West Germany, belly landing at Passau, eight miles (13 km) from the Soviet zone.

=== Return to the RAF ===
After his wife recovered in hospital from injuries received during the crash, he rejoined the RAF for five years, but at the age of 36 was not allowed to fly again. He joined the RAF rifle shooting team. Peřina applied for a United States visa in London in 1949 and emigrated to Canada, even though Air Marshal Sir Arthur Tedder tried to persuade him to stay.

=== North America ===
In 1953 while in Canada he gained a job building fibreglass fishing boats, but also trained as a commercial pilot - however being over the age of 42 could not find work. At Christmas 1959 the couple's US residency was confirmed and he joined the new plastics division of ejection seat specialist Weber Aircraft in Burbank, California (later a subsidiary of French-based Zodiac Group). Supervising 347 people, his division made lavatories and kitchens for Douglas, Lockheed and Boeing including the Boeing 747 and seats for the Project Gemini space capsules. Following his retirement on 15 March 1979 Peřina and his wife retired to Arizona but finding it too hot moved to Las Vegas, Nevada.

=== Return to Czech Republic and commemoration ===
In 1993 Peřina and his wife returned to the Czech Republic following the removal of the Communist regime. Many citizens, not least those in the newly emerging military, greeted him with a 'hero's welcome'. Peřina commented that he simply wanted to die on home soil and that it was the country that he fought for and stressed repeatedly that he loved the Czech countryside. He was made a General of the Czech Republic Air Forces.

Peřina died on 6 May 2006 aged 95 in Prague's military hospital of an unspecified chronic disease and exhaustion. His wife Anna Peřinová (née Klimešová) had died several days before his admission to hospital on 21 April Radio Prague reported. One elementary school in Prague has been given his name. In 2011 the Niue Island issued the 100 NZD gold coin depicting and commemorating the Legendary fighter pilot in the Battle of Britain, General Peřina. In 2017, the Czech Mint issued silver and gold commemorative coins (under the authority of Niue) paying tribute to František Peřina.

== Combat record ==
Date	Service	Flying	Kills	Probables	Notes
10 May 1940	Armée de l'Air	Curtiss H-75A	4 * Dornier Do 17		Two missions (all shared victories)
11 May 1940	Armée de l'Air	Curtiss H-75A	1 * Heinkel He 111		Became Ace (shared)
12 May 1940	Armée de l'Air	Curtiss H-75A	2 * Junkers Ju 87	2 * Junkers Ju 87	
18 May 1940	Armée de l'Air	Curtiss H-75A	1 * Heinkel He 111		(shared)
19 May 1940	Armée de l'Air	Curtiss H-75A	1 * Heinkel He 111		(shared)
26 May 1940	Armée de l'Air	Curtiss H-75A	1 * Heinkel He 111		(shared)
1 June 1940	Armée de l'Air	Curtiss H-75A	1 * Heinkel He 111	2 * Heinkel He 111	The day Jean Accart was believed killed in action
3 June 1940	Armée de l'Air	Curtiss H-75A	1 * Messerschmitt Bf 110		Shot down, hospitalised
3 June 1942	Royal Air Force	Spitfire MkV	1 * Focke-Wulf Fw 190	1 * Focke-Wulf Fw 190	
TOTALS			13 kills	5 probables	
