= Laissey =

- Commune
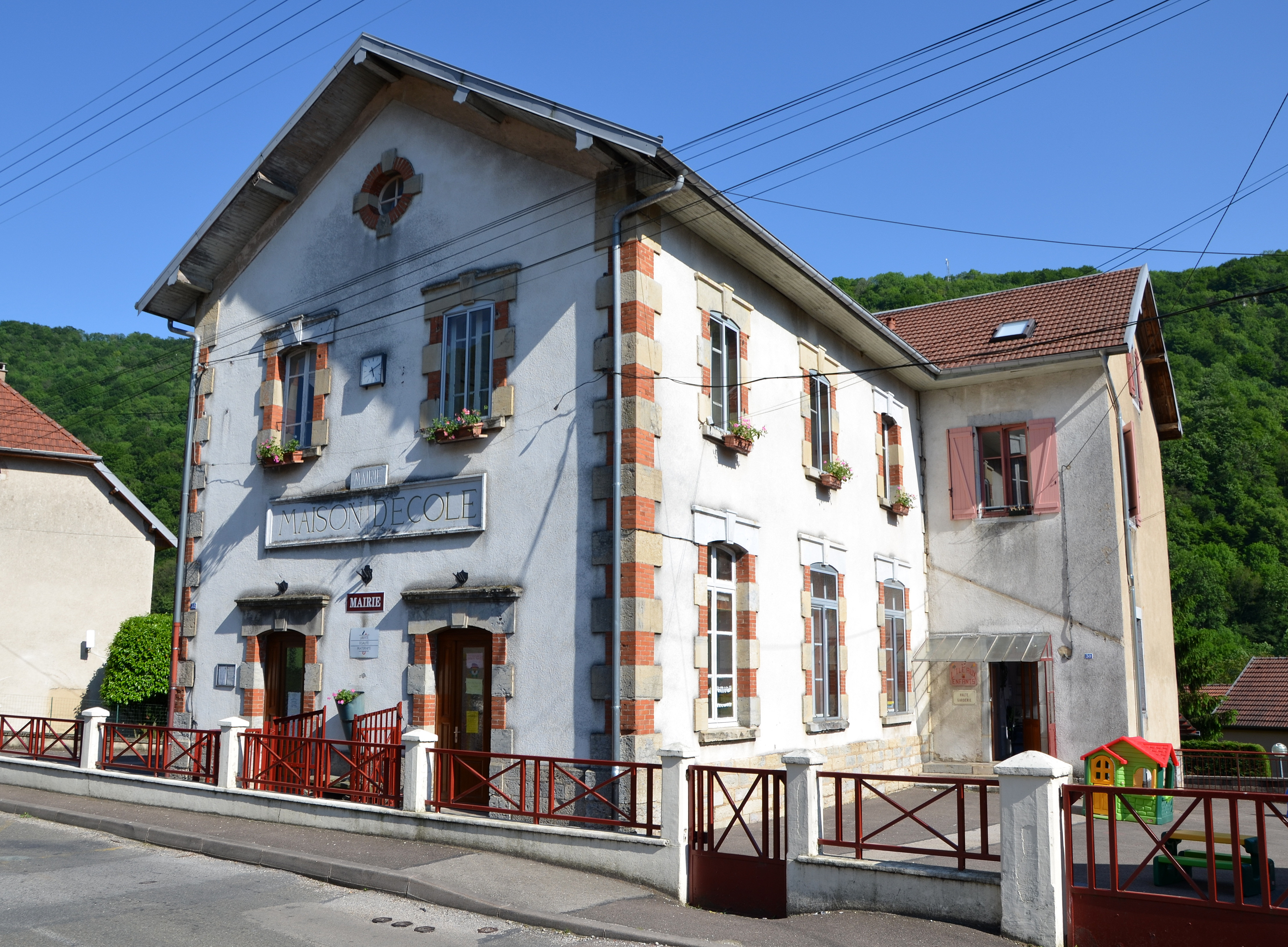
- The town hall in Laissey

- Coat of arms
- Location of Laissey
- Location within France Location within Bourgogne-Franche-Comté
- Coordinates: 47°17′55″N 6°13′54″E
- Country: France
- Region: Bourgogne-Franche-Comté
- Department: Doubs
- Arrondissement: Besançon
- Canton: Baume-les-Dames

Government
  - Mayor (2024–2026): Bernard Cuenot
- Area^{1}: 2.86 km^{2} (1.10 sq mi)
- Highest elevation: 592 m (1,942 ft)
- Lowest elevation: 251 m (823 ft)
- Population (2023): 438
  - Density: 153/km^{2} (397/sq mi)
- Time zone: UTC+01:00 (CET)
  - Summer (DST): UTC+02:00 (CEST)
- INSEE/Postal code: 25323 /25820
- ^{1} French Land Register data, which excludes lakes, ponds, glaciers > 1 km^{2} (0.386 sq mi or 247 acres) and river estuaries.

Laissey (French pronunciation: [lɛsɛ]) is a commune in the Doubs department in the Bourgogne-Franche-Comté region in eastern France.

== Geography ==
The village lies in the deep valley of the river Doubs. The Cascade du Rougnon is a 17-meter waterfall.

== Population ==
Historical population
Year	Pop.	±% p.a.
1968	545	—
1975	501	−1.20%
1982	495	−0.17%
1990	399	−2.66%
1999	416	+0.46%
2007	437	+0.62%
2012	458	+0.94%
2017	439	−0.84%
2023	438	−0.04%
Source: INSEE

== Economy ==
The village housed a mill from its inception, which served the villages of the Roulans plateau and Bouclans.

At the beginning of the 19th century, an iron mine was opened that employed up to 60 miners. However, with the arrival of the railroad in 1860, the mine was closed.

About 1870, a textile mill was established on the site of the old mill. It employed about 30 women, but it closed when the Bost brothers opened a tool factory at the end of the 19th century. From that time on, the village grew along with the factory. Of its 500 inhabitants, 200 worked at the factory.

== See also ==
- Communes of the Doubs department
