= Émile Leblanc =

French WWII pilot (1907–1944)

- Born: Émile Marie Lucien Leblanc; 24 March 1907; Jussy-Champagne, Cher, France
- Died: 28 January 1944 (aged 36); French Algeria
- Military career
- Allegiance: France
- Branch: French Air Force
- Service years: 1927–1944
- Nickname: Christian
- Conflicts: World War II

Émile Leblanc (24 March 1907 – 28 January 1944) was a French flying ace of World War II.

== Bibliography ==
- Hugot, Bernard (July–August 2020). "Émile "Christian" Leblanc, un as exemplaire" [Émile "Christian" Leblanc, an Exemplary Ace]. Avions (in French) (235): 6–35. ISSN 1243-8650.
