= Peter Horn (pilot) =

Danish flying ace

- Born: Peter Horn; 15 October 1915; Denmark
- Died: 21 February 1983 (aged 69); Denmark
- Burial place: Denmark
- Military career
- Allegiance: Denmark, Germany
- Branch: Air Force Royal Danish Air Force Luftwaffe
- Service years: 1937–1945
- Rank: Sekondløjtnant
- Units: JG 51; JG 54
- Conflicts: World War II; Eastern Front
- Awards: Iron Cross, 1st Class (Germany); Iron Cross, 2nd Class (Germany); Front Flying Clasp of the Luftwaffe ( Germany)

Peter Horn (15 October 1915 – 1 November 1983) was a Danish fighter pilot.

== Early Life ==
Peter Horn was born in 15 October 1915. He joined the Danish Army and trained as a pilot, graduating as a qualified pilot in 1937 (certificate 214/37). On 9 October 1938 he was made Sekondløjtnant (2nd Lieutenant) and at the outbreak of war, was a Lieutenant in the reserve. Horn joined the National Socialist Workers' Party of Denmark in 9 December 1931.

== Luftwaffe ==
On 8 July 1941, the Ministry of War announced they will give permits to commissioned officers of the danish army to join the Frikorps Danmark. Peter Horn enlisted for the Luftwaffe and was enlisted in the Jd51 and fought until the end of the war. He was credit with a total of 10 or 11 aerial victories.

After the war the danish government aggressively persecuted individuals who cooperated with Nazi Germany, he was dishonorably dismissed in after severe post war legal scrutiny and social ostracization in 1945 and lived his post war life in strict anonymity until his death in 1 November 1983.

He was awarded the Iron Cross 1st and 2nd class and the Front Flying Clasp of the Luftwaffe.
