= Jean Accart =

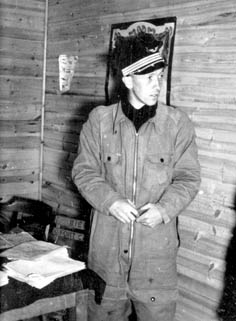
Jean Accart

Jean Accart (7 April 1912 in Fécamp – 19 August 1992 in La Gaude) was a French flying ace during World War II.

Born in April 1912, Accart began his military career joining the French Navy in 1932. He then volunteered for aircrew in naval aviation, becoming an observer, before training as a pilot and serving with Escadrille 3S1.

In 1936, the escadrille was transferred to the French Air Force and Accart became commandant of Escadrille GC 1/5, which would claim 71 victories during the Battle of France, losing only one pilot to enemy fire. He personally shared in the destruction of at least 12 Luftwaffe bombers during the battle. On 1 June 1940, while intercepting a group of Luftwaffe bombers, Accart was hit by return fire, a bullet penetrating the windscreen of his fighter and lodging in his skull. Accart managed to parachute to safety.

While recovering he wrote Chasseurs du Ciel (Sky Hunters), an account of his wartime actions. After recuperating he was posted to the Southern region air defense Headquarters. In November 1941 he attended the Air Academy in Salon de Provence.

Released from military duty in November 1942, he journeyed to Spain with several students, before arriving in North Africa after the Allied liberation. He joined the Free French forces and was given command of GC 2/2 in January 1944. He left in October 1944 to attend Staff School at Fort Leavenworth in the US. Assigned to the French department of aerial studies and planning, he became the inspector general of the French Air Force just before the end of the war.

Promoted to lieutenant colonel, he became cabinet chief of the French Air Force headquarters in December 1947, and then deputy director of the flight test centre in Brétigny during March 1948.

In July 1951, he was made inspector of the fighter arm, and in September became CO of Air Base 112 in Reims. He became second in command of the Etat-Major de l'Armée de l'Air (EMAA) four years later. In November 1960 he was nominated as the commandant of the first Tactical Air Command (CATAC) and French Air Force in Germany (FAFA), and promoted to major general in January 1961. He retired as a lieutenant general as inspector of armament fabrication program In March 1965.

Jean Marie Accart died on 19 August 1992.

== Honors and Awards ==
- Grand Cross of the Order of the Legion of Honour (1965)
- Croix de guerre 1939-1945
- Aeronautical Medal

== Bibliography ==
- Cony, Christophe (April 2003). "Jean Mary Accart, maître de la chasse française (Première partie)" [Jean Mary Accart, a French Master of the Fighter (first part)]. Avions: Toute l'aéronautique et son histoire (in French) (122): 6–15. ISSN 1243-8650.
- Cony, Christophe (May 2003). "Jean Mary Accart, maître de la chasse française (Deuxième partie)" [Jean Mary Accart, a French Master of the Fighter (second part)]. Avions: Toute l'aéronautique et son histoire (in French) (122): 32–41. ISSN 1243-8650.
- Cony, Christophe (June 2003). "Jean Mary Accart, maître de la chasse française (fin)" [Jean Mary Accart, a French Master of the Fighter (last part)]. Avions: Toute l'aéronautique et son histoire (in French) (123): 24–33. ISSN 1243-8650.
