= Lists of World War II topics =

This is a list of World War II-related topic lists:

== General topics ==
- List of theaters and campaigns of World War II
- List of World War II military operations
  - List of military operations on the Eastern Front of World War II
- List of World War II battles

== Equipment ==
=== Aircraft ===
- List of aircraft of World War II
- List of helicopters used in World War II
- List of jet aircraft of World War II
- List of aircraft of the French Air Force during World War II
- List of aircraft of the British, World War II
- List of aircraft of Italy, World War II
- List of aircraft of Japan, World War II
- List of Japanese trainer aircraft during World War II
- List of aircraft of the Luftwaffe, World War II
- List of Luftwaffe aircraft prototype projects during World War II
- List of Luftwaffe aircraft by manufacturer, World War II
- List of aircraft of Russia, World War II
- List of aircraft of the U.S. military, World War II
- List of undersea-carried planes during World War II
- List of units using the B-26 Marauder during World War II

=== Ships ===
- List of aircraft carriers of World War II
- List of battleships of World War II
- List of coastal defence ships of World War II
- List of corvettes of World War II
- List of cruisers of World War II
- List of destroyers of World War II
- List of frigates of World War II
- List of military vehicles of World War II
- List of mine warfare vessels of World War II
- List of minor warships of World War II
- List of monitors of World War II
- List of ship classes of World War II
- Lists of ships of World War II
- List of submarines of World War II
- List of World War II ships of less than 1000 tons
- List of Japanese Navy ships and war vessels in World War II
- List of major World War II warships built by minor powers
- List of United States Navy losses in World War II
- List of U.S. Navy ships sunk or damaged in action during World War II
- List of World War II vessel types of the United States
- List of Royal Canadian Navy ships of the Second World War

=== Vehicles ===
- List of armoured fighting vehicles of World War II
- List of foreign vehicles used by Nazi Germany in World War II
- List of Japanese Army military engineer vehicles of World War II
- List of prototype World War II combat vehicles
- List of World War II military vehicles of Germany
- List of World War II tanks

=== Weapons ===
- List of common World War II infantry weapons
- List of Greek-made weapons and improvements from interwar and World War II
- List of Japanese World War II army bombs
- List of Japanese World War II navy bombs
- List of Japanese World War II explosives
- List of secondary and special-issue World War II infantry weapons
- List of World War II artillery
- List of World War II firearms
- List of World War II firearms of Germany
- List of World War II guided missiles of Germany
- List of World War II Infantry Anti-Tank Weapons of Germany
- List of World War II torpedoes of Germany
- List of World War II weapons
- List of World War II weapons of China
- List of World War II weapons of France
- List of World War II weapons of Germany
- List of World War II weapons of Italy
- List of World War II weapons of the Soviet Union
- List of World War II weapons of the United Kingdom
- List of World War II weapons of the United States

=== By nation ===
- List of Bulgarian military equipment of World War II
- List of Chinese military equipment in World War II
- List of Dutch military equipment of World War II
- List of Japanese military equipment of World War II
- List of Soviet Union military equipment of World War II
- List of World War II weapons used in Ireland

=== Radar and electronic warfare ===
- List of Japanese World War II radar
- List of World War II British naval radar
- List of World War II electronic warfare equipment

=== Other equipment ===
- Equipment losses in World War II
- List of World War II military equipment
- List of World War II military gliders

== Personnel ==
=== Aces ===
- Lists of World War II flying aces
- List of World War II aces from Australia
- List of World War II aces from Austria
- List of World War II aces from Belgium
- List of World War II aces from Bulgaria
- List of World War II aces from Canada
- List of World War II aces from China
- List of World War II aces from Croatia
- List of World War II aces from Czechoslovakia
- List of World War II aces from Denmark
- List of World War II aces from Finland
- List of World War II aces from France
- List of World War II aces from Germany
- List of German World War II jet aces
- List of World War II aces from Greece
- List of World War II aces from Hungary
- List of World War II aces from Italy
- List of World War II aces from Japan
- List of World War II aces from New Zealand
- List of World War II aces from Norway
- List of World War II aces from Poland
- List of World War II aces from Rhodesia
- List of World War II aces from Romania
- List of World War II aces from Slovakia
- List of World War II aces from South Africa
- List of World War II aces from the Soviet Union
- List of World War II aces from Spain
- List of World War II aces from the United Kingdom
- List of World War II aces from the United States

=== Awardees ===
- List of Medal of Honor recipients for World War II
  - List of Medal of Honor recipients for the Battle of Iwo Jima
- List of Second World War Victoria Cross recipients
- List of Navy Cross recipients for World War II

=== Other personnel ===
- List of Allied traitors during World War II
- List of Japanese World War II military specialists on the USSR
- List of Japanese government and military commanders of World War II
- List of general officers of the United States Army Medical Department in World War II
- List of NFL players in World War II
- List of last surviving World War II veterans
- List of spies in World War II
- List of U.S. general officers and flag officers killed in World War II
- List of war correspondents in World War II
- List of World War II U-boat commanders

== Strategic bombing ==
- Bombing of Berlin in World War II
- Bombing of Braunschweig in World War II
- Bombing of Bremen in World War II
- Bombing of Bucharest in World War II
- Bombing of Cologne in World War II
- Bombing of Dresden in World War II
- Bombing of Duisburg in World War II
- Bombing of Essen in World War II
- Bombing of Friedrichshafen in World War II
- Bombing of Gelsenkirchen in World War II
- Bombing of Germany in World War II
- Bombing of Hamburg in World War II
- Bombing of Kassel in World War II
- Bombing of Kobe in World War II
- Bombing of Leipzig in World War II
- Bombing of Lübeck in World War II
- Bombing of Nordhausen in World War II
- Bombing of Ploiesti in World War II
- Bombing of Sofia in World War II
- Bombing of Tokyo in World War II
- Bombing of U-boat pens and yards in World War II
- Bombing of the United Kingdom in World War II
- Bombing of Vienna in World War II
- Bombing of Würzburg in World War II
- Bombing of Zagreb in World War II

== Units ==
- List of Australian divisions in World War II
- List of Belgian regiments in World War II
- List of British armies in World War II
- List of British corps in World War II
- List of British divisions in World War II
- List of British brigades of the Second World War
- List of World War II British airborne battalions
- List of Canadian divisions in World War II
- List of Dutch regiments in World War II
- List of Finnish divisions in the Continuation War
- List of French divisions in World War II
- List of World War II military units of Germany
  - List of German army groups in World War II
  - List of German corps in World War II
  - List of German divisions in World War II
  - List of German brigades in World War II
- List of Indian divisions in World War II
- List of Italian divisions in World War II
- List of Japanese infantry divisions
- List of Polish divisions in World War II
- List of United States divisions during World War II

== Arts and entertainment ==
- List of Allied propaganda films of World War II
- List of World War II films
- List of World War II science fiction, fantasy, and horror films
- List of World War II short films
- List of World War II television series
- List of World War II video games

== Miscellaneous ==
- Names of World War II
- Glossary of German military terms
- List of World War II battles involving the United States
- List of diplomatic missions during World War II
- List of governments in exile during World War II
- List of Japanese-run internment camps during World War II
- List of maritime disasters in World War II
- List of Special Operations Executive operations
- List of territories occupied by Imperial Japan
- List of broadsides of major World War II ships
- List of World War II conferences
- List of World War II convoys
- List of World War II evacuations
- Lists of World War II prisoner-of-war camps
- List of World War II puppet states
