= Russell Willson =

American flag officer and inventor

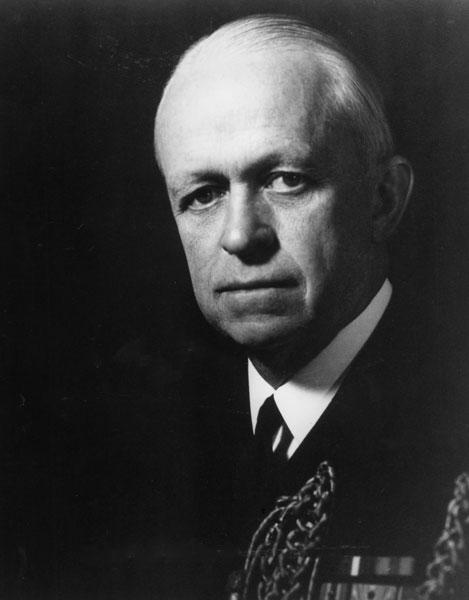
- Born: 27 December 1883; Fredonia, New York, U.S.
- Died: 6 June 1948 (aged 64); Chevy Chase, Maryland, U.S.
- Burial place: United States Naval Academy Cemetery, Annapolis, Maryland
- Military career
- Allegiance: United States of America
- Branch: United States Navy
- Service years: 1906–1945
- Rank: Vice Admiral
- Commands: Battleship Division 1
- Conflicts: Vera Cruz Incident; World War I World War II
- Awards: Navy Cross; Distinguished Service Medal (Navy); Distinguished Service Medal (U.S. Army)

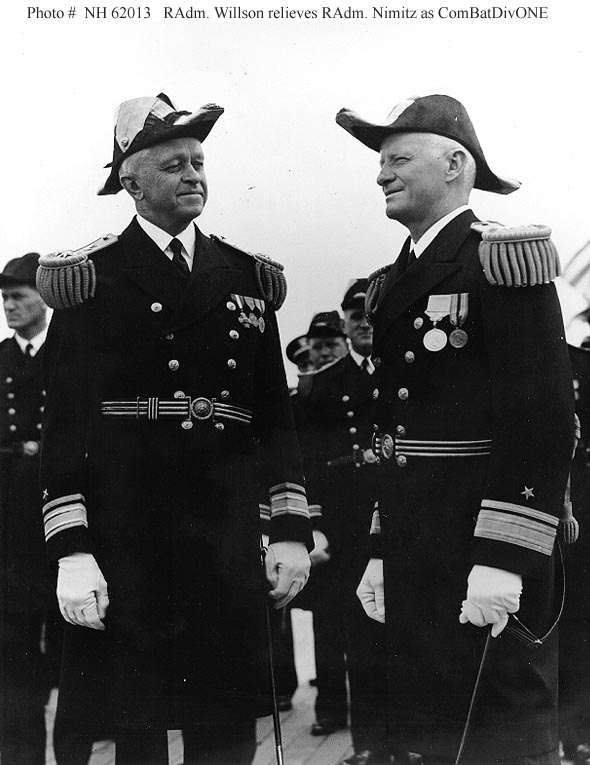
Rear Admiral Russell Willson (left) relieves Rear Admiral Chester W. Nimitz (right) aboard the battleship USS Arizona on 26 May 1939.

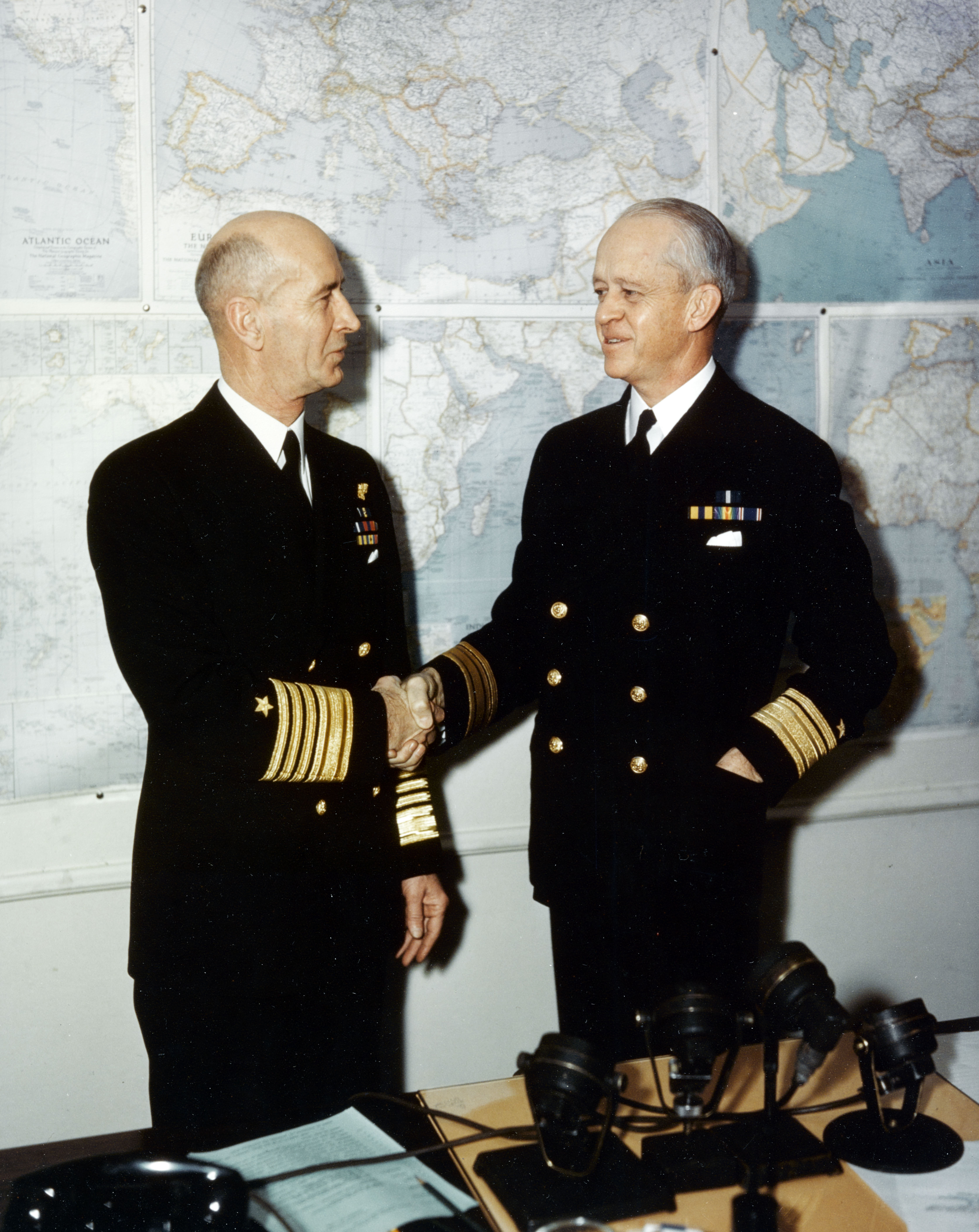
Admiral Ernest J. King (left) shakes hands with Willson at the time of Admiral King's appointment as Commander in Chief, United States Fleet, and RADM Willson's appointment as Chief of Staff, circa late December 1941.

Vice Admiral Russell Willson (December 27, 1883 – June 6, 1948) was a flag officer of the United States Navy and inventor of the Navy Cipher Box (also called 'Naval Cipher Box' or 'Navy Code Box') issued in 1917.

The son of Sidney Louis Willson and Lucy Fenton Staats Willson, Russell Willson attended the Massachusetts Institute of Technology in 1901–1902, before going on to graduate from the United States Naval Academy in 1906.

== Career ==
After graduating from the naval academy, Wilson was commissioned an ensign in 1908. He served in the battleship USS New York during the Vera Cruz Incident at Vera Cruz, Mexico, in 1914 and later as flag lieutenant to Admiral Henry Mayo, who was Commander-in-Chief, United States Atlantic Fleet.

=== World War I ===
During World War I, Willson organized and developed the Navy's Code Signal Section in the United States Department of the Navy, for which he was awarded the Navy Cross. He served with the Sixth Battle Squadron of the Royal Navy's Grand Fleet at the end of World War I.

=== Interwar years ===
Willson commanded destroyers at Greenland in connection with the United States Army's around-the-world flight in 1924. He graduated from the Naval War College in 1924 and was a member of the U.S. Naval Mission to Brazil from 1927 to 1930. He served as naval attache at the United States Embassy in London in 1937 and 1938. Rear Admiral Willson was the last commander of Battleship Division 1 in peacetime prior to the start of World War II. On 26 May 1939, he relieved Rear Admiral Chester Nimitz as ComBatDiv1, and was relieved on 23 January 1941 by Rear Admiral Isaac Campbell Kidd, who died on the division flagship, USS Arizona (BB-39), in the Japanese attack on Pearl Harbor on 7 December 1941.

On 1 February 1941, Willson became the superintendent of the United States Naval Academy. In April 1941, Willson refused to allow the school's lacrosse team to play a visiting team from Harvard University because the Harvard team included an African-American player. Harvard's athletic director ordered the player home and the game was played on 4 April, as scheduled, which Navy won 12–0.

=== World War II ===
After the entry of the US in World War II, Willson, who had served on Admiral Mayo's staff with Ernest J. King, became the chief of staff to King in his role as Commander in Chief, U.S. Fleet (COMINCH) on 30 December 1941, Willson taking office the day that King assumed that command. In September 1942, Willson was detached for duty with the United States Pacific Fleet, but before he could report to his new assignment was found medically unfit for sea duty. As a result, he retired in January 1943, but was retained in Washington, D.C., for the duration of the war as Deputy Commander-in-Chief, U.S. Fleet. He also served from November 1942 as the naval member of the Joint Strategic Survey Committee for the Joint Chiefs of Staff. Willson was a principal at several of the wartime conferences between Franklin Delano Roosevelt and Winston Churchill. He was also a member of the U.S. delegation at the Dumbarton Oaks Conference and military advisor at the San Francisco Conference.

After World War II, Willson became associate editor of World Report.

== Personal life ==
An Episcopalian, Russell Willson married Eunice Westcott Willson (1884–1962) on 3 June 1911. They had a son, Russell, and two daughters, Eunice and Mary. Lt. Russell Willson, Jr. (1919–1945), USN, was a naval aviator who died in a training accident, and Eunice Willson (1912–2011) worked for the Navy for several years as a cryptanalyst. Russell Willson and his wife, as well as Russell Willson, Jr., are buried together in the United States Naval Academy Cemetery in Annapolis, Maryland.

== Decorations ==
Navy Cross
Navy Distinguished Service Medal
Army Distinguished Service Medal

=== Navy Cross citation ===
The President of the United States of America takes pleasure in presenting the Navy Cross to Commander Russell Willson, United States Navy, for exceptionally meritorious service in a duty of great responsibility in connection with the preparation, handling, and distribution of war codes and for devising a new and very efficient system of such communications during World War I.

== See also ==
- List of superintendents of the United States Naval Academy
