= List of World War II infantry anti-tank weapons of Germany =

List of World War II Infantry Anti-tank weapons of Germany

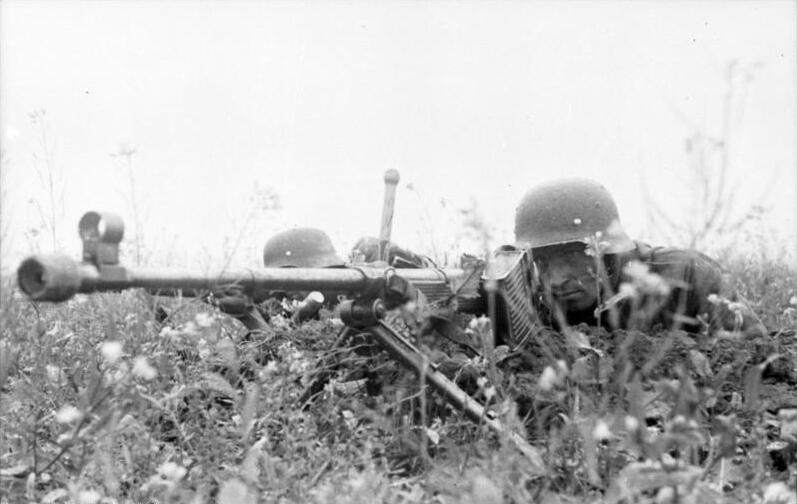
Dug in soldiers with the Panzerbüchse 39 deployed on the Eastern Front.

== Anti-Tank Weapons ==
Panzerbüchse (German: "anti-tank rifles")

- Panzerbüchse 35 (polnisch) (PzB 35(p)) - a captured Polish Kb ppanc wz.35 anti-tank rifle
- Panzerbüchse 38 anti-tank rifle
- Panzerbüchse 39 anti-tank rifle
- Panzerbüchse Boyes - a captured British Boys 0.55 Anti-tank rifle

Rocket weapons

- Raketen-Panzerbüchse 43 ('rocket tank rifle 43'), a.k.a. Püppchen ('dolly')
- Raketen-Panzerbüchse 54, a.k.a. "Panzerschreck"

Recoilless guns

- Panzerfaust 30 klein, a.k.a. Faustpatrone ('fist cartridge')
- Panzerfaust 30
- Panzerfaust 60
- Panzerfaust 100

Miscellaneous

- Sturmpistole
- Panzerschreck
