= List of World War II battles involving the United States =

This is a list of all battles involving the United States during World War II.

Name	Start Date	End	Location	Campaign	U.S. Casualties	Result	Opposing Force	Notes
Battle of the Atlantic	September 13, 1941	May 8, 1945	Atlantic Ocean, North Sea, Irish Sea, Labrador Sea, Gulf of St. Lawrence, Caribbean Sea, Gulf of Mexico, Outer Banks, Arctic Ocean		Around 18,000 sailors and merchant seamen killed	Allied victory	Germany, Italy	Longest military campaign of World War II; U.S. involvement began before the formal U.S. declaration of war on Germany; Attempted blockade of the United Kingdom and the Soviet Union through attacks on merchant shipping and Allied naval ships bringing supplies and military reinforcement from North America; Allied victory achieved through implementation of convoy system; Eventually resulted in Allied naval superiority over German surface raiders and U-boats.
Operation Torch	November 8, 1942	November 10, 1942	Morocco and Algeria	North African Campaign	1,200 (479 killed, 720 wounded)	Allied victory	Vichy France Germany Italy	first involvement of American forces in Mediterranean and Middle East theatre; first major American airborne assault; resulted in Free French control of French West Africa and Anglo-American occupation of western French North Africa; lead to full German occupation of Vichy France
Battle of the Kasserine Pass	February 19, 1943	February 25, 1943	Kasserine Pass, Tunisia	Tunisia Campaign	6,500 (1,000+ killed); or, 9,195 (2,572 killed, 56 wounded and 10 captured or missing)	Axis victory	Germany and Italy	resulted in major reorganization of the U.S. Army; resulted in delay of planned amphibious invasion of France
Battle of El Guettar	March 23, 1943	April 7, 1943	El Guettar, Tunisia	Tunisia Campaign	~5,000	Indecisive	Germany and Italy	
Battle of Gela	July 10, 1943	July 12, 1943	Gela, Sicily	Italian Campaign	2,300, 1 destroyer sunk	Allied victory	Germany and Italy	first battle of Allied invasion of Sicily; resulted in increased prioritization of naval artillery support
Battle of Salerno	September 9, 1943	September 16, 1943	Salerno, Italy	Italian Campaign	4,870	Allied victory	Germany and Italy	first battle of the Allied invasion of mainland Italy
Battle of Monte Cassino	January 17, 1944	May 18, 1944	Monte Cassino, Italy	Italian Campaign	100,000+ (Total allied casualties)	Allied victory	Germany	resulted in controversial bombing of Monte Cassino Abbey; resulted in defeat of the Senger Line
Battle of Anzio	January 22, 1944	June 5, 1944	Anzio and Nettuno, Italy	Italian Campaign	23,173 (5,538 killed, 15,558 wounded and 2,947 captured or missing)	Allied victory	Germany	resulted in heavy fighting; allowed the German Tenth Army to withdraw to the Gothic Line
Battle of Normandy	June 6, 1944	July 24, 1944	Normandy, France	Operation Overlord	63,360 (16,293 killed, 43,221 wounded and 6,180 captured or missing)	Allied victory	Germany	successfully established Allied beachhead in France and neutralized the Atlantic Wall; resulted in withdrawal of German forces in northern France to Paris
Battle of Graignes	June 10, 1944	June 12, 1944	Graignes, France	Operation Overlord	32 (17 executed)	American victory	Germany	Failed in objective to capture Graignes; Followed by Waffen-SS massacre of American prisoners of war
Battle of Carentan	June 10, 1944	June 14, 1944	Carentan, France	Operation Overlord		American victory	Germany	Consolidated American beachheads against German counterattack; allowed seizure of the Cotentin Peninsula
Battle for Brest	August 7, 1944	September 19, 1944	Brittany, France	Operation Overlord	~4,000	Allied victory	Germany	Resulted in seizure of Brest; German sabotage prevented use of port facilities
Operation Dragoon	August 15, 1944	September 14, 1944	Southern France	Operation Overlord	15,574 (7,301 killed, 5,804 wounded, 3,098 captured or missing)	Allied victory	Germany	Allied capture of Southern France; Free French recapture of Toulon and Marseille; withdrawal of Army Group G from Southern France through the Rhône River Valley to the Vosges
Battle of Nancy	September 5, 1944	September 15, 1944	Nancy, France	Siegfried Line campaign	2,851+	American victory	Germany	American capture of Nancy and crossing of the Moselle River
Operation Market Garden	September 17, 1944	September 25, 1944	The Netherlands	Siegfried Line campaign	3,974	Allied operational failure	Germany	Successfully liberated large parts of the Netherlands including Eindhoven and Nijmegen; created a salient limiting V-2 rocket attacks; failed in operational objective to create bridgehead across the Rhine River into Germany and end the war by the end of 1944; Resulted in major reorientation of Western Allied military strategy
Battle of Hürtgen Forest	September 19, 1944	February 10, 1945	Hurtgen Forest, German-Belgian border	Siegfried Line campaign	33,000	German defensive victory	Germany	longest ever battle fought by the U.S. Army; Failure to capture the Rur River
Battle of Metz	September 27, 1944	December 13, 1944	Metz, France	Siegfried Line campaign	2,851+	American tactical victory, German strategic victory	Germany	American capture of Metz; hindered advance of U.S. Third Army
Battle of Aachen	October 2, 1944	October 21, 1944	Aachen, Germany	Siegfried Line campaign	5,000	American victory	Germany	One of largest urban battles fought by the U.S. Army during the war; Resulted in American occupation of Aachen and destruction of much of the city; First German city captured by the Western Allies; Delayed Allied advance into the Ruhr Basin
Battle of the Bulge	December 16, 1944	January 25, 1945	The Ardennes, Belgium, Luxembourg, and Germany	Siegfried Line campaign	89,500 (19,000 killed, 47,500 wounded, 23,000 missing)	Allied victory	Germany	Final German offensive on the Western Front; Caused temporary delay of Western Allied advance; Failure in German strategic objective to recapture Antwerp, encircle Allied forces in the Low Countries, and force the Western Allies to draft a separate peace treaty; resulted in depletion and collapse of Wehrmacht forces, ultimately accelerating Western Allied advance and capture of the Siegfried Line as well as the Soviet Union's Vistula–Oder Offensive on the Eastern Front
Operation Nordwind	January 1, 1945	January 25, 1945	Alsace and Lorraine, France	Siegfried Line campaign	12,000 (3,000 killed, 9,000 wounded or missing)	German operational failure	Germany	Failure of German strategic objective to destroy Allied forces in Alsace and Lorraine; Resulted in German salient in central Alsace
Colmar Pocket	January 20, 1945	February 9, 1945	Alsace, France	Siegfried Line campaign	8,000	Allied victory	Germany	Failure of German objective to recapture northern Alsace; Resulted in full French control of Alsace
Ruhr Pocket	March 7, 1945	April 21, 1945	Ruhr Area, Germany	Western Allied invasion of Germany		Allied victory	Germany	Successful encirclement and division of Army Group B; Surrender of German Fifteenth Army and German forces under Walter Model's command; Western Allied occupation of the Ruhr and advance towards the Elbe River
Operation Varsity	March 24, 1945		Wesel, Germany	Western Allied invasion of Germany	2,700	Allied victory	Germany	Allied airborne operations in Hamminkeln and Wesel to secure British invasion and occupation of northwestern Germany; Successfully established bridgeheads on the Rhine
Battle of Frankfurt	March 26, 1945	March 29, 1945	Frankfurt, Germany	Western Allied invasion of Germany	unknown	American victory	Germany	Achieved Allied capture of Frankfurt
Battle of Paderborn	March 30, 1945	March 31, 1945	Paderborn, Germany	Western Allied invasion of Germany		American victory	Germany	Major General Maurice Rose is killed in battle and is the highest-ranking U.S. Armed Forces officer to be killed in action at the Western Front.
Battle of Kassel	April 1, 1945	April 4, 1945	Kassel, Germany	Western Allied invasion of Germany	Unknown	American victory	Germany	Victory allowed U.S. Third Army advance through Hesse towards Frankfurt am Main
Battle of Heilbronn	April 4, 1945	April 12, 1945	Heilbronn, Germany	Western Allied invasion of Germany	422 (60 killed, 250 wounded, 112 missing)	American victory	Germany	House-to-house combat involving Volkssturm auxiliary units; Resulted in American occupation of Heilbronn and the Neckar River; Continuation of southeastern advance towards Heidelberg and Bavaria
Battle of Nuremberg	April 16, 1945	April 20, 1945	Nuremberg, Germany	Western Allied invasion of Germany		American victory	Germany	Most intense urban battle of the war.; Considered a major blow to Germany.
Spring 1945 offensive in Italy	April 6, 1945	May 2, 1945	Northern Italy	Italian Campaign	16,258 (1,288 killed, 15,453 wounded and 93 missing)	Allied victory	Germany	Planned Allied offensive towards Lombardy; Ended with the death of Benito Mussolini and complete surrender of Axis forces; Final battle of the Italian Campaign
Attack on Pearl Harbor	December 7, 1941		Pearl Harbor, Hawaii, United States		3,592 (2,345 killed and 1,247 wounded)	Japanese tactical victory	Japan	Preventive strike on the U.S. Pacific Fleet to prevent American intervention in planned Japanese offensive into Southeast Asia; Major Japanese tactical victory resulting in the destruction of American naval ships and base installations; Failure of Japanese objective to destroy American aircraft carriers and achieve decisive victory; Caused the United States to formally enter World War II and declare war on Japan, Germany, and Italy; Resulted in reorganization and buildup of the U.S. Armed Forces; Resulted in shift in public opinion in favor of entering the war
Battle of Wake Island	December 8, 1941	December 23, 1941	Wake Island		627 (130 killed, 49 wounded and 448 captured)	Japanese victory	Japan	Successful Japanese invasion and occupation of Wake Island despite U.S. Marine Corps resistance; Continued Japanese occupation until the end of the war
Battle of Bataan	January 7, 1942	April 9, 1942	Bataan Peninsula, Philippines	Philippines campaign (1941–1942)	15,000 captured and interned	Japanese victory	Japan	Last stand of American and Filipino forces; Ended in Japanese capture of Bataan Peninsula
Doolittle Raid	April 18, 1942		Tokyo and other Japanese cities		3 killed and 8 later died in captivity/executed	US propaganda victory	Japan	First American air raid against the Japanese Home Islands; Intended as retaliation for the Pearl Harbor attack; Minor damage to Japanese urban and military targets, including Tokyo; Improved American morale and damaged Japanese morale
Battle of the Coral Sea	May 4, 1942	May 8, 1942	Coral Sea, between Australia, New Guinea, and the Solomon Islands	New Guinea campaign	656 killed	Japanese tactical victory, Allied strategic victory	Japan	First naval battle in history fought between aircraft carriers; Japanese tactical victory; ended in successful invasion and occupation of Tulagi and the British Solomon Islands; American strategic victory; prevented Japanese invasion of Port Moresby; Resulted in damage to Japanese aircraft carriers Shōkaku and Zuikaku; Resulted in fragility of Japanese forces in the South West Pacific
Battle of Milne Bay	August 25, 1942	September 7, 1942	Milne Bay, Papua New Guinea	New Guinea campaign	14 killed	Allied victory	Japan	Attempted capture of Allied airfields at Milne Bay; Resulted in Japanese withdrawal due to unexpected participation of the First Australian Imperial Force and Allied attacks on Japanese supply lines
Battle of Wau	29 January 1943	February 4, 1943	Wau, Papua New Guinea	New Guinea campaign		Allied victory	Japan	Japanese attempt to fight back after the battle is over but are repelled.
Battle of Wakde	18 May 1944	21, May 1944	Wakde, Indonesia	New Guinea campaign	147 (40 killed, 107 wounded)	American victory	Japan	Wakde Airfield is obtained.
Battle of Biak	27 May 1944	August 17, 1944	Biak, Indonesia	New Guinea campaign		Allied victory	Japan	Biak becomes a logistical center for the Allies.
Battle of Driniumor River	July 10, 1944	August 25, 1944	Near Aitape, Papua New Guinea	New Guinea campaign	3,000 (440 killed and 2,560 wounded)	American victory	Japan	Resulted in withdrawal of Japanese forces after heavy fighting
Battle of Sansapor	July 30, 1944	August 31, 1944	Bird's Head Peninsula, Indonesia	New Guinea campaign	49 (15 killed and 35 wounded)	American victory	Japan	
Battle of Midway	June 3, 1942	June 7, 1942	Near Midway Atoll		307 killed	American victory	Japan	Considered by historians to be one of the most important naval battles in history; Contributed to depletion of manpower and material of the Imperial Japanese Navy; Failure to divert American aircraft carriers into trap and invade Midway Island in preparation for future offensives against Fiji, Samoa, and Hawaii; Ended in destruction of four Japanese fleet carriers; Turning point in the Pacific War resulting in Japanese retreat and American offensives
Battle of Guadalcanal	August 7, 1942	February 9, 1943	Guadalcanal in the Solomon Islands	Solomon Islands campaign	~6,000 (1,600 killed, 4,400 wounded and missing they were never found)	Allied victory	Japan	Major Allied victory recapturing the Solomon Islands; Ended in withdrawal of Japanese forces from the Solomon Islands; Contributed to depletion of Imperial Japanese Army; Forced Japanese military to end offensives and shift to defensive strategy
Battle of the Santa Cruz Islands	October 25, 1942	October 27, 1942	Santa Cruz Islands, Solomon Islands	Solomon Islands campaign	266 killed	Japanese tactical victory, American strategic victory	Japan	Ended in retreat of Allied surface ships; Resulted in loss of Japanese aircrews
Battle of Tarawa	November 20, 1943	November 23, 1943	Betio, Tarawa Atoll	Gilbert and Marshall Islands campaign	3,296 (1,000 killed and 2,296 wounded)	American victory	Japan	American amphibious landing; Resulted in capture of Tarawa Atoll after heavy fighting
Battle of Makin	November 20, 1943	November 24, 1943	Makin Atoll, Gilbert Islands	Gilber and Marshall Islands campaign	948 (763 killed and 185 wounded)	American victory	Japan	
Battle of Kwajalein	January 31, 1944	February 3, 1944	Kwajalein Atoll, Marshall Islands	Gilbert and Marshall Islands campaign	1,964 (372 killed and 1,592 wounded)	American victory	Japan	Ended in American seizure of Kwajelein Atoll; Provided major boost to American morale
Battle of Eniwetok	February 17, 1944	February 23, 1944	Enewetok Atoll, Marshall Islands	Gilbert and Marshall Islands campaign	1,269 (313 killed, 879 wounded, 77 missing)	American victory	Japan	Ended in seizure of Eniwetok as a forward base for future offensives into the Japanese South Seas Mandate
Battle of Saipan	June 15, 1944	July 9, 1944	Saipan, Mariana Islands	Mariana and Palau Islands campaign	13,313 (2,949 killed and 10,364 wounded)	American victory	Japan	Ended in American occupation of Saipan; Brought Japanese home islands within range of American B-29 Superfortress heavy bombers; Prompted resignation of Japanese Prime Minister Hideki Tojo
Battle of the Philippine Sea	June 19, 1944	June 20, 1944	Philippine Sea	Mariana and Palau Islands campaign	109 killed	American victory	Japan	Largest carrier battle in history; Completely eliminated Japanese ability to mount large-scale carrier operations; Ended in Japanese withdrawal from the Philippine Sea and American offensive towards the Philippines
Battle of Guam	July 21, 1944	August 8, 1944	Guam, Mariana Islands	Mariana and Palau Islands campaign	7,800 (1,747 killed and 6,053 wounded)	Allied victory	Japan	Ended Japanese occupation of Guam
Battle of Tinian	July 24, 1944	August 1, 1944	Tinian, Mariana Islands	Mariana and Palau Islands campaign	1,919 (326 killed and 1,593 wounded)	American victory	Japan	Ended in American capture of Tinian as forward air base
Battle of Peleliu	September 15, 1944	November 27, 1944	Peleliu, Palau Islands	Mariana and Palau Islands campaign	9,804 (1,794 killed and 8,010 wounded)	American victory	Japan	Ended in American capture of Peleliu as forward air base; Controversial due to high casualty rate of the 1st Marine Division and the 81st Infantry Division alongside minor strategic value
Battle of Angaur	September 17, 1944	September 30, 1944	Angaur, Palau Islands	Mariana and Palau Islands campaign	260 killed	American victory	Japan	Ended in American capture of Angaur as forward air base
Battle of Leyte Gulf	October 23, 1944	October 26, 1944	Leyte Gulf, Philippines	Philippines campaign (1944–45)	~1,500 killed	Allied victory	Japan	Sometimes considered to be the "largest naval battle in history"; Final naval battle in history fought between battleships; Saw the introduction of Japanese kamikaze attacks; Isolated Japanese holdings in Southeast Asia from the Home Islands; Allied defeat of Japanese naval forces despite their full mobilization; Commenced American offensive into the Philippines
Battle of Luzon	January 9, 1945	August 15, 1945	Luzon, Philippines	Philippines campaign (1944–45)	~37,870 (8,310 killed and 29,560 wounded)	Allied victory	Japan	Highest net casualty for U.S. forces during World War II; Resulted in Allied liberation of Luzon
Battle of Manila	February 3, 1945	March 3, 1945	Manila, Philippines	Philippines campaign (1944–45)	6,575 (1,010 killed and 5,565 wounded)	Allied victory	Japan	One of the most intense urban battles fought by American forces during the war; Accompanied with massacres of Filipino civilians by Japanese forces
Battle of Bessang Pass	June 1, 1945	June 15, 1945	Ilocos Sur, Philippines	Philippines campaign (1944–45)	339 (119 killed and 220 wounded)	Allied victory	Japan	Ended in entrapment of Japanese forces under General Tomoyuki Yamashita's command
Battle of Iwo Jima	February 19, 1945	March 26, 1945	Iwo Jima, Japan	Volcano and Ryukyu Islands campaign	26,038 (6,821 killed and 19,217 wounded)	American victory	Japan	One of the most intensive battles of the Pacific theatre; initially controversial due to heavy casualties and low strategic value of Iwo Jima; Ended in the American occupation of Iwo Jima aided by overwhelming military superiority, later used as an emergency landing base for American bombers; Resulted in most of the Japanese combatants being killed in action; Site of Joe Rosenthal's iconic photograph Raising the Flag on Iwo Jima.
Battle of Okinawa	April 1, 1945	June 22, 1945	Okinawa, Japan	Volcano and Ryukyu Islands campaign	51,429 (12,513 killed and 38,916 wounded)	Allied victory	Japan	largest amphibious battle of the Pacific theatre of World War II; Ended in heavy casualties for both sides; Large-scale deaths of Okinawan civilians.; Ended in U.S. occupation of Okinawa; Intended as a preparatory battle to the abandoned Western Allied invasions of Kyūshū and Honshu.; Heavy civilian and combat casualties may have influenced U.S. decision to use atomic bombs against Hiroshima and Nagasaki
Battle of Java Sea	February 27, 1942	February 27, 1942,	Java Sea	Java Sea	(2300 Americans Killed)	Japanese victory		
