= List of Japanese World War II military specialists on the USSR =

List of Japanese World War II experts in Russian/Soviet topics from the 1920s until the end of World War II. The experts listed here acquired their knowledge during the Russo-Japanese War, 1918-27 Siberian intervention, and diplomatic attachés to the Soviet Union.

- Aritomo Yamagata
- Saburo Hayashi
- Michitarō Komatsubara
- Motojiro Akashi
- Korechika Anami
- Sadao Araki
- Okikatsu Arao (Koko)
- Kitsuju Ayabe
- Masutaro Nakai
- Shōjirō Iida
- Toshizō Nishio
- Torashirō Kawabe
- Minoru Sasaki
- Kantarō Suzuki
- Jun Ushiroku
- Otozō Yamada
- Jirō Minami
- Kyoji Tominaga
- Heitarō Kimura
- Shigenori Kuroda
- Mitsumasa Yonai
