= List of British armies in World War II =

During the Second World War, the British Army created several field armies. There were formations that controlled multiple army corps, which in turn controlled numerous divisions. An army would also control additional artillery, engineers, and logistical units that would be used to support the subordinate corps and divisions as needed. Each army was generally under the control of a higher formation, such as an army group or a command. Over the course of the war, eight armies were formed. An attempt to form a ninth – the Second British Expeditionary Force, the second overall – was made, and one regional command was redesignated as an army for a short period. Inter-allied co-operation resulted in the creation of the First Allied Airborne Army, and deception efforts saw a further four armies existed within the British military structure. Seventeen armies, real or fictitious, were created, although they did not all exist at the same time. (Note: Through faulty intelligence, Germany believed that Britain had two additional field armies: the Third Army and the Fifth Army. The former was believed to have been formed from Northern Command while the latter was thought to have been created from Eastern Command. In addition to the armies formed by the British Army, the British Indian Army contained three; the Eastern (defence of Assam, Bengal, Bihar, and Orissa), North Western (security of North-West Frontier), and the Southern armies (defence of southern India and control of various administration, medical, training, logistical facilities). These were all formed on 21 April 1942 when prior commands were reorganised.)

The first army-level command, the British Expeditionary Force (BEF), was formed in September 1939 following the outbreak of the war and dispatched to France. It provides a complicated example of an army chain of command. Its commander General John Vereker, the Viscount Gort, was in control of the BEF and all British forces in France. While being responsible to report to a high-level French command, he was also made a subordinate of a French army group and was also under the command of the main British headquarters in London. An example of a simpler chain of command is provided by the Fourteenth Army that reported only to the 11th Army Group. (Note: The chain of command extended above the army group level. The 11th Army Group (redesignated as Allied Land Forces South East Asia on 12 November 1944) reported to South East Asia Command, the theatre-level headquarters that coordinated army, Royal Navy, and Royal Air Force assets in the region. That command was subordinate to the British political-military command based in the UK, which coordinated the actions of all British armed forces with the Combined Chiefs of Staff, the inter-allied supreme staff.) The final army formed during the war was the Twelfth Army, which was created in May 1945.

Within the British military, armies were commanded by lieutenant-generals. For a variety of reasons, once the appointment was made, commanders could be promoted to a full general. There were several exceptions to this norm; John Vereker was a full general when he was placed in command of the BEF, as was Henry Maitland Wilson when he was chosen to lead the Ninth Army. General Claude Auchinleck was commander-in-chief of all forces based in the Middle East when he decided to take over personal command of the Eighth Army.

The size, composition, and strength of an army could dramatically vary. The BEF, the primary British force in 1940, was thirteen divisions strong and had a strength of around 394,000 men by May 1940. It was composed entirely of British formations. Others, such as the Eighth Army, were composed of forces from multiple nations. At the Second Battle of El Alamein, the Eighth Army had around 195,000 men consisting of Australian, British, French, Greek, Indian, New Zealand, and South African troops spread over eleven divisions and several additional brigades. In 1945, the Eighth Army was 632,980 men strong spread over eight divisions, various brigades, and other smaller units. It was then composed of British, Indian, Italian, New Zealand, and Polish troops, as well as the men of the Jewish Infantry Brigade. The Fourteenth Army, which fought in British India and Burma, was the largest British army-level formation assembled during the war. It commanded around one million soldiers from Britain, British India, and the British African colonies.

== Armies ==
Armies
Formation name	Created	Ceased to exist	Insignia	Locations served	Notable campaigns
British Expeditionary Force	September 1939	May 1940	N/A	France, Belgium	Battle of Belgium, Battle of France, Dunkirk evacuation
Second British Expeditionary Force	June 1940	June 1940	N/A	France	Battle of France
First Allied Airborne Army	August 1944	May 1945	A blue shield with the word "Allied Airborne" on a black background near the top. The centre of the shield contains a white number one with yellow wings. At the bottom, a pair of crossed gladiator swords point down, on a purple-red background.	France, Belgium, Netherlands, Germany	Operation Market Garden, Battle of the Bulge, Western Allied invasion of Germany
First Army	July 1942	May 1943	A white crusader sword, point down and with a golden hilt, on top of the red cross of St George. The entire emblem is within a white shield.	UK, Algeria, Tunisia	Invasion of French North Africa, Tunisian campaign
Second Army	June 1943	June 1945	A blue cross with a superimposed crusader sword, on a white crusader shield background.	UK, France, Belgium, Netherlands, Germany	Normandy campaign, Allied advance from Paris to the Rhine, Western Allied invasion of Germany
Fourth Army	Jun 1943; Mar 1944	Nov 1943; Feb 1945	rectangular badge with gold lion on red field with black horizontal stripe	UK (notionally)	N/A
Sixth Army	1943	1945	N/A	UK (notionally)	N/A
South-Eastern Army	December 1941	1942	N/A	UK	N/A
Eighth Army	September 1941	July 1945	A yellow cross on a white shield	Egypt, Italian Libya, Tunisia, Italy, Austria	Western Desert campaign, Tunisian campaign, Allied invasion of Sicily, Italian campaign
Ninth Army	December 1941	August 1945	Small fort atop a charging elephant, red within a black circle	Cyprus, Palestine, Transjordan	N/A
Tenth Army	February 1942	April 1943	A yellow Assyrian lion on a black background	Iran, Iraq	N/A
Twelfth Army	May 1943	May 1945	A seal balancing a globe on its nose, which showed the eastern hemisphere.	Egypt, British India (notionally)	N/A
Twelfth Army	May 1945	January 1946	A red rectangle with a central black bar. On this background is a Burmese dragon. Under it, is the roman numerals XII in white.	Burma	Burma campaign
Fourteenth Army	November 1943	November 1945	A red shield with a virtual white sword, pointing down. A central black horizontal bar, containing the Roman numeral XIV in white, overlaps the sword.	British India, Burma	Burma campaign

=== British Expeditionary Force ===
The British Expeditionary Force (BEF) was dispatched to France at the outbreak of the Second World War. It was originally intended to be split into two armies as additional British forces arrived. By May 1940, when the Battle of Belgium and France began, this had not occurred. The following month, it was forced to withdraw to the UK and the headquarters was dissolved. (Note: The original deployment plan, for the Territorial Army, was to dispatch all 24 divisions to reinforce the BEF. They would be sent to France in waves, as divisions finished training and were fully equipped. It was envisioned that the final territorial division would be dispatched to France one year after the start of the war.)

=== Second British Expeditionary Force ===
Following the evacuation of the BEF, in May–June 1940, large numbers of British forces remained in France. The British government was determined to reinforce the French and prepared to dispatch a Second British Expeditionary Force as soon as forces became available. This coincided with a French proposal to form a national redoubt in Brittany that would use the new BEF – initially one British and one Canadian division, in addition to the forces still in France – and the remnants of the French Army. This plan proved impracticable; the French military was disintegrating and the British withdrew all remaining forces from France via operations Aerial and Cycle.

=== First Allied Airborne Army ===
The First Allied Airborne Army was formed on 2 August 1944 as the Combined Airborne Force. It was redesignated as the First Airborne Army on 18 August, and controlled American and British airborne corps. In turn, the corps commanded American, British, and Polish airborne formations. The majority of the army's staff, including the general officer commanding, were American. A British officer was second-in-command. The army oversaw the Anglo-American airborne element in Operation Market Garden, controlled American airborne forces that fought in the Battle of the Bulge, and commanded the Anglo-American landings during Operation Varsity. The army was disbanded on 20 May 1945.

=== First Army ===
The headquarters of the First Army was originally formed in July 1941 as Force 110, which subsequently became the "Expeditionary Force" in March 1942 and then First Army on 10 July 1942. The army was dispatched to fight in North Africa and was disbanded following the end of the Tunisian Campaign. A contemporaneous First Army document described the badge as representing the UK and its strength in a crusade against evil.

=== Second Army ===
The Second Army controlled Anglo-Canadian forces during the invasion of Normandy in France, and then advanced east. It entered Germany in the final stages of the war in Europe. On 24 and 25 June 1945, with the war in Europe over, the army was disbanded and its subordinate formations became an integral part of the military government in the British occupation zone in Germany.|

=== Fourth Army ===
Scottish Command created and maintained the ruse of the Fourth Army, with the lion of their own insignia replaced with a mediaeval-style numeral four. The deception formation threatened an Allied invasion of German-occupied Norway during 1943 (Operation Tindall). The Fourth Army was recreated for the same task in 1944 (Operation Fortitude North). In July 1944, the formation joined the deceptive First United States Army Group (Fortitude South II). Later in the year, it was used to project a threat towards the Netherlands and Germany. In early 1945, German intelligence were informed that the army had been used as a source of reinforcements for formations abroad fighting and that it was then merged with Northern Command.

=== Sixth Army ===
Sixth Army was formed by Eastern Command for deception purposes. It was used to pose a threat to any coast of north-eastern Europe but was not actively employed in any deception effort after 1943. German intelligence maintained it on the British order of battle until the end of the war.

=== South-Eastern Army ===
When Bernard Montgomery took command of South-Eastern Command in December 1941, he renamed it the South-Eastern Army. When Montgomery's successor took over, the formation reverted to its prior title.

=== Eighth Army ===
Initially formed as the Western Army on 10 September 1941, it was redesignated as the Eighth Army sixteen days later. The Imperial War Museum wrote that the insignia was based on a crusader shield and the initial design may have included a red cross. The museum noted that versions of this initial design exist, but it is not known how widely distributed they were. Red was replaced by yellow due to the concern the former could be confused with the logo of the Red Cross. The army fought throughout the North African Campaign, landed and advanced through Italy, and by the end of the war was located in Austria. It was disbanded on 29 July 1945 and its forces were used to form the command British Troops Austria. (Note: Prior to being retitled as Eighth Army, it was also known as the Army of the Nile. Winston Churchill, the British prime minister, also referred to it as the Western Desert Force.)

=== Ninth Army ===
The Ninth Army was created to control British-led forces in the eastern Mediterranean and parts of the Middle East. Its mission was to counter any Axis advance via Turkey.

=== Tenth Army ===
The Tenth Army controlled forces based in Iran and Iraq and maintained the supply line from the Persian Gulf to the Soviet Union. As the German 1942 offensive entered the Caucasus, a threat to British interests in the Middle East emerged and the army was to counter any such advance. The insignia depicted a lion in an Assyrian style.

=== Twelfth Army ===
Twelfth Army was a notional army formed in 1943 for deception purposes. It was used to pose a threat towards Crete and southern Greece, in an effort to divert Axis attention away from Italy and the pending Allied invasion of Sicily (Operation Husky). During 1944, the threat switched from Greece to the Italian Province of Pola. Afterwards, it was notionally transferred to British India and was used to threaten an Allied invasion of Sumatra during 1945. This deception ended when an actual Twelfth Army was activated.

=== Twelfth Army ===
Twelfth Army was formed to manage the final stage of the Burma campaign in 1945. The insignia depicted a Burmese dragon.

=== Fourteenth Army ===
Formed from the British Indian Army's Eastern Army, Fourteenth Army was the largest British field army during the war. The Imperial War Museum wrote; "at one point it held the longest battle line, from the Bay of Bengal to the borders of India and China". It fought in India and Burma from 1943 until 1945, when it was withdrawn and replaced by the Twelfth Army. It was intended that the Fourteenth Army would conduct a combat landing to liberate British Malaya, but the war ended before that occurred and it peacefully entered Malaya in September. Fourteenth Army was renamed Malaya Command on 1 November 1945 . The army was disbanded on 1 November 1945.
