= 8.8 cm Raketenwerfer 43 =

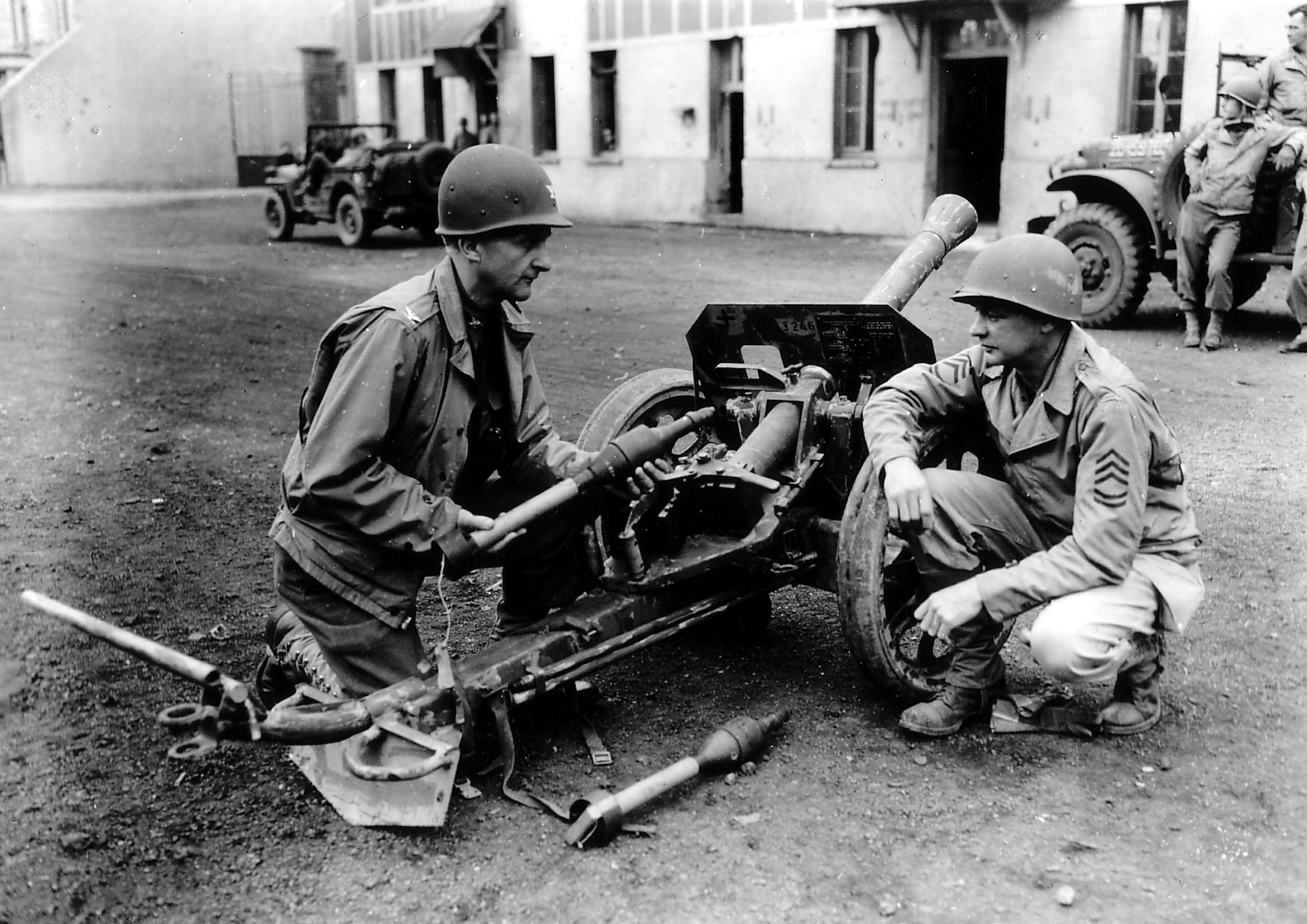
- The 8.8 cm Raketenwerfer 43 being inspected by Allied troops. Note the presence of the wrong ammunition (Note: Projectile in the image held by officer is RPzB. Gr. 4322 electrically primed with long tailboom, meant for Panzerschreck. Raketenwerfer 43 projectile RPzB. Gr. 4312 is percussion primed and tailboom is shorter.)
- Type: Anti-tank rocket launcher
- Place of origin: Nazi Germany

Service history
- In service: 1943–45
- Used by: Nazi Germany
- Wars: World War II

Production history
- No. built: ~3000

Specifications
- Mass: 143 kg (315 lb)
- Length: 2.9 m (9 ft 6 in)
- Width: 1 m (3 ft 3 in)
- Height: .89 m (2 ft 11 in)
- Crew: 2
- Cartridge: RPzB. Gr. 4312
- Caliber: 88 mm (3.5 in)
- Action: breech loaded, fired from closed breech
- Muzzle velocity: 140 m/s (460 ft/s)
- Effective firing range: 230 m (750 ft) (moving target); 500 m (1,600 ft) (stationary target)
- Maximum firing range: 750 m (2,460 ft)

The 8.8 cm Raketenwerfer 43 Puppchen (Note: Many sources refer to this weapon as Püppchen, German for "little doll". The official name was Puppchen without the umlaut.) was an 88 mm calibre reusable anti-tank rocket launcher developed by Nazi Germany during World War II.

The Raketenwerfer 43 was given to the infantry to bolster their anti-tank capability. The weapon was fired from a small two-wheeled gun carriage and fired a percussion-primed, rocket-propelled, fin-stabilized grenade - RPzB. Gr. 4312 - with a shaped charge warhead. The grenade had a shorter tailboom of 490 mm (19 in) compared to the 650 mm (26 in) tailboom for the electrically-primed grenade RPzB. Gr. 4322 for the Panzerschreck. antitank rocket launcher Both grenades used identical warhead and fuzing.

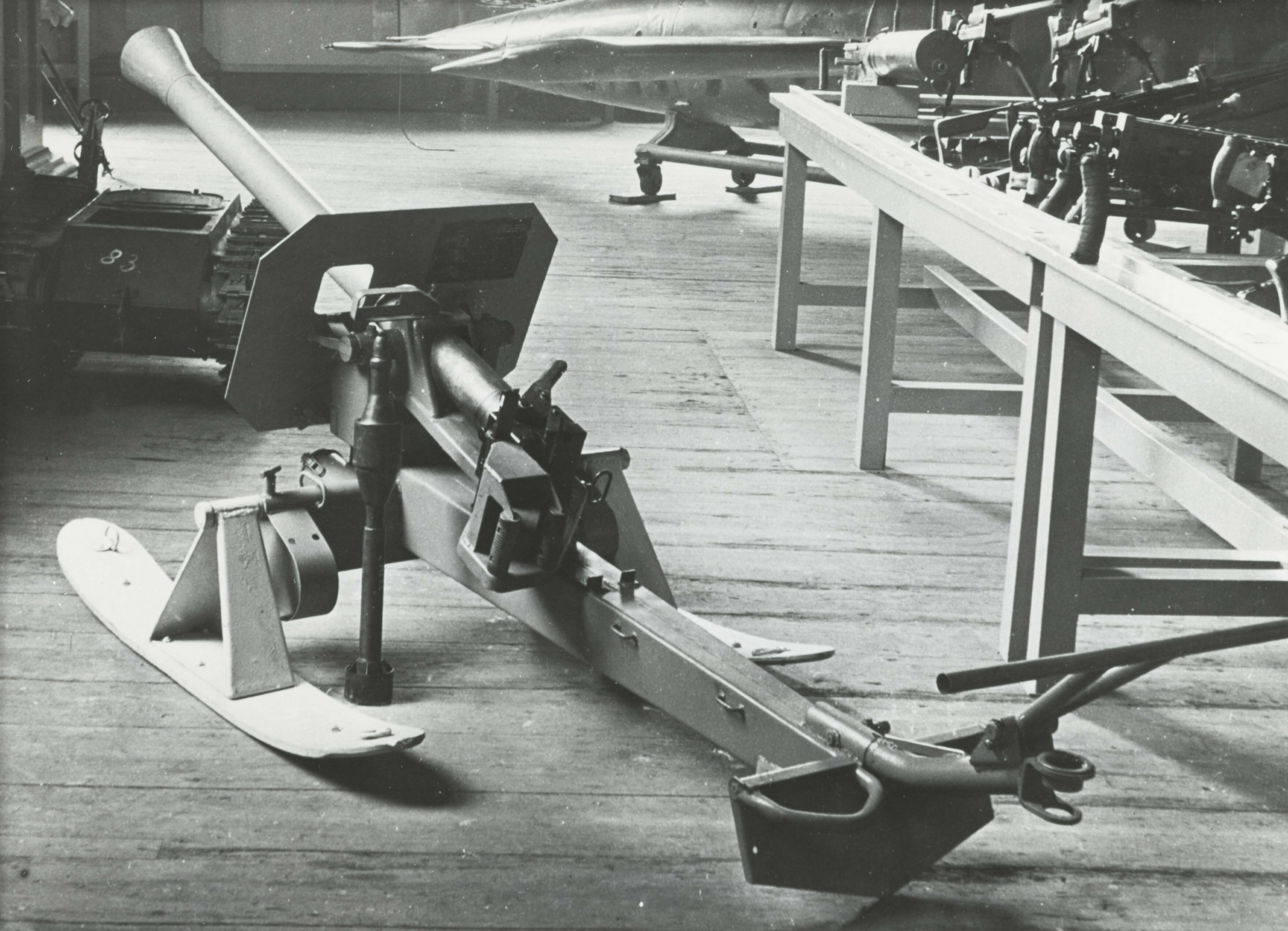
Raketenwerfer 43 mounted on skis

Approximately 3,000 units were completed from 1943 to 1945. It was made in much smaller numbers than either the Panzerschreck, which was based on the American bazooka rocket launcher, or the Panzerfaust, which was a disposable anti tank recoilless rifle. This is partly because it was realized that a simple hollow tube with an ignition device was all that was needed to launch the 88 mm rocket, rather than an elaborate miniature artillery piece with carriage and breech. Due to the carriage and better sights, the accuracy was better, and the range more than double that of the Panzerschreck. However, Raketenwerfer 43 was more expensive, heavier and had longer production time than Panzerschreck or Panzerfaust.

== See also ==
- Shoulder-launched missile weapon
- List of common World War II infantry weapons
