= Panzerschreck =

German anti-tank rocket launcher, WW2

Panzerschreck Raketenpanzerbüchse 54
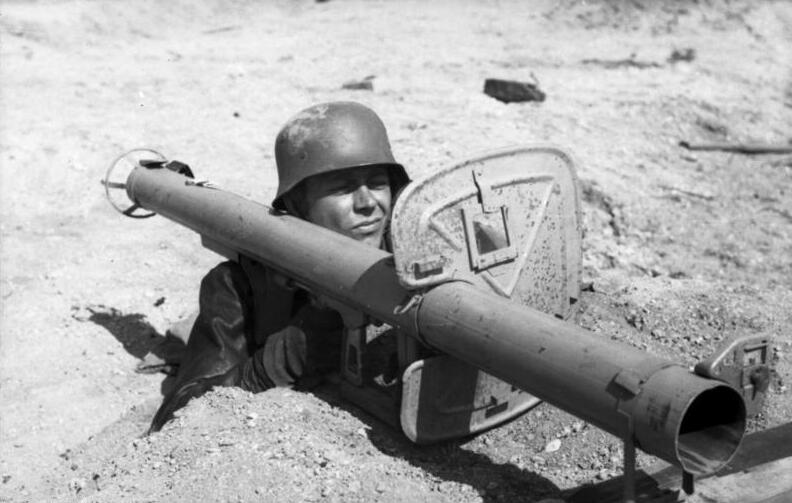
- The improved Raketenpanzerbüchse 54 with blast shield
- Type: Anti-tank rocket launcher
- Place of origin: Nazi Germany

Service history
- In service: 1943–1945 (Nazi Germany)
- Used by: See Users
- Wars: World War II

Production history
- Designed: 1942
- Manufacturer: Enzinger Union AG and HASAG
- Unit cost: 70 ℛ︁ℳ︁
- Produced: 1942 - 1945
- No. built: 314,895
- Variants: RPzB 54, RPzB 54/1

Specifications
- Mass: 11 kg (24 lb) empty (RPzB 54) with shield
- Length: 164 centimetres (65 in)
- Caliber: 88 mm (3.5 in)
- Muzzle velocity: 110 m/s (360 ft/s)
- Effective firing range: 150 m (490 ft) RPzB 54

Panzerschreck (lit. "tank's dread" or "tank's bane") was the popular name for the Raketenpanzerbüchse 54 ("Rocket Anti-armor Rifle Model 54", abbreviated to RPzB 54), an 88 mm reusable anti-tank rocket launcher developed by Nazi Germany in World War II. Another earlier, official name was Ofenrohr ("stove pipe").

The Panzerschreck was designed as a lightweight infantry anti-tank weapon and was essentially an enlarged copy of the American bazooka. The weapon was shoulder-launched and fired a fin-stabilized rocket with a shaped-charge warhead. It was made in much smaller numbers than the Panzerfaust, which was a light, disposable anti-tank weapon that used a system akin to recoilless rifles.

== History ==
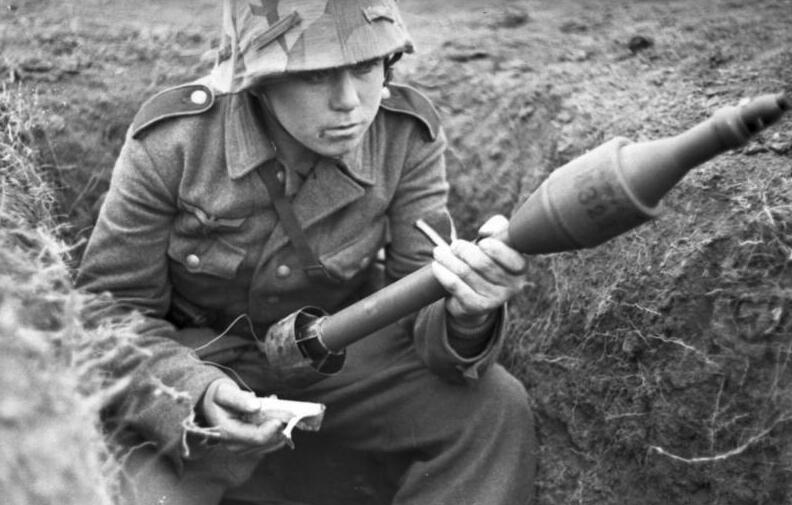
A German soldier handling a RPzB. Gr. 4322 HEAT rocket used with the Panzerschreck

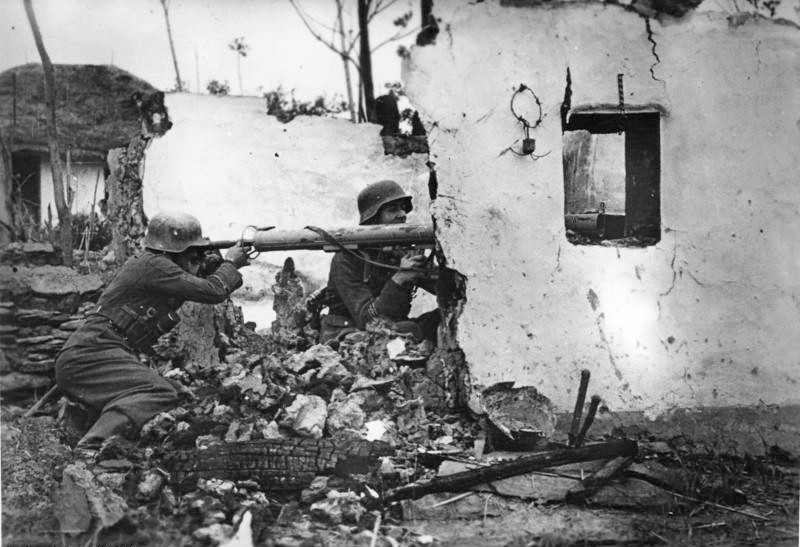
Soldiers of the German Großdeutschland division's Panzerfüsilier regiment prepare an ambush in the ruins of a destroyed building on the Eastern Front, 1944.

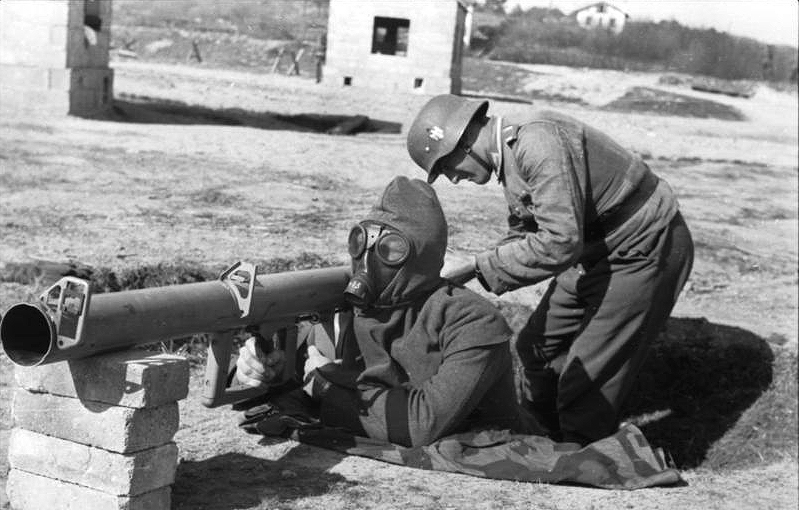
RPzB 54 operator wearing protective mask and poncho

The Panzerschreck development was initially based on the American "bazooka", captured during the Tunisian campaign, November 1942. The Panzerschreck was larger and heavier than its American counterpart – the Panzerschreck had an 88 mm calibre, compared to the 57 mm calibre of the bazooka – allowing it to penetrate thicker armour, but also required a larger motor, creating more smoke when firing.

The 88 mm calibre was selected as the existing RPzB. Gr. 4312 for the 8.8 cm Raketenwerfer 43 was reused for Panzerschreck. Warhead and fuzing was carried over, but the rocket motor's housing needed lengthening from 490 mm (19 in) to 650 mm (26 in) to accommodate the longer rocket motor. Raketenwerfer 43 had percussion firing, whereas for the Panzerschreck an electrical priming was selected, forming standard grenade RPzB. Gr. 4322. Other munitions were developed, including drill dummy, practice live rocket with inert warhead and standard grenade with improved contact system.

The earliest production model of the RPzB 54 was 164 centimetres (5 ft 5 in) long and weighed about 9.25 kilograms (20.4 lb) when empty. Unlike the rockets used in American bazookas, which extinguished before leaving the tube, the RPzB rockets kept burning for about 2 metres (6.6 ft) after exiting the tube. Users were instructed to wear heavy gloves, a protective poncho and a gas mask without a filter to protect them from the heat of the backblast when the weapon was fired. Improvised shields were made to protect the user and, in February 1944, the RPzB 54 was fitted with an official blast shield to protect the operator; this made the weapon heavier, weighing 11 kilograms (24 lb) empty. Small numbers of the shortened RPzB 54/1 were later produced. It had an improved rocket, a shorter barrel, and a range increased to about 180 metres (590 ft).

Firing the RPzB generated copious amounts of smoke, both in front of and behind the weapon. Because of the weapon's tube and the smoke produced, official documentation named the weapon the Ofenrohr ("stove pipe"). This also meant that anti-tank teams were revealed once they fired, making them targets and, therefore, required them to shift positions after firing. This type of system also made it problematic to fire the weapon from inside closed spaces (such as bunkers or houses), filling the room with toxic smoke and revealing the firing location immediately.

Late war German tactical doctrine called for Panzerschreck and/or Panzerfaust teams to set up in staggered trenches no further than 115 metres (377 ft) apart. In this way, attacking armor would face anti-tank fire from multiple directions at a distance of no more than 69 metres (226 ft). Anti-tank teams were instructed to aim for the thinner side or rear armor whenever possible. Allied armored units frequently attempted to add improvised protection to their tanks, e.g., sandbags, spare track units, logs and so on to protect against HEAT rounds. Another defense was to rig metal mesh and netting around the tank, resembling the German Schürzen auxiliary plates. In practice, about 1 meter of air gap were required to substantially reduce the penetrating capability of the RPzB, thus skirts and sandbags were ineffective against the RPzB and Panzerfaust.

In 1944, Germany provided the Panzerschreck to Finland, which used it to great effect against Soviet armour. The Finnish name for the weapon was Panssarikauhu (literal translation of the German name).

The Italian Social Republic and Hungary also used the Panzerschreck. Several Italian units became known as skilled anti-tank hunters and the Hungarians used the Panzerschreck extensively during Operation Spring Awakening.

== Performance ==
Penetration measured against Face-Hardened Armor (FHA), Rolled Homogeneous Armor (RHA).

Testing nation	Armor	Angle (°)	Penetration (mm)
Germany	RHA	90	230
Germany	RHA	60	160
Germany	RHA	30	95
Finland	FHA	30	100
United States	FHA	90	216
United States	FHA (6" / 152 mm) + RHA (2.25" / 57 mm)	90	210
United States	FHA	90	152

== Users ==
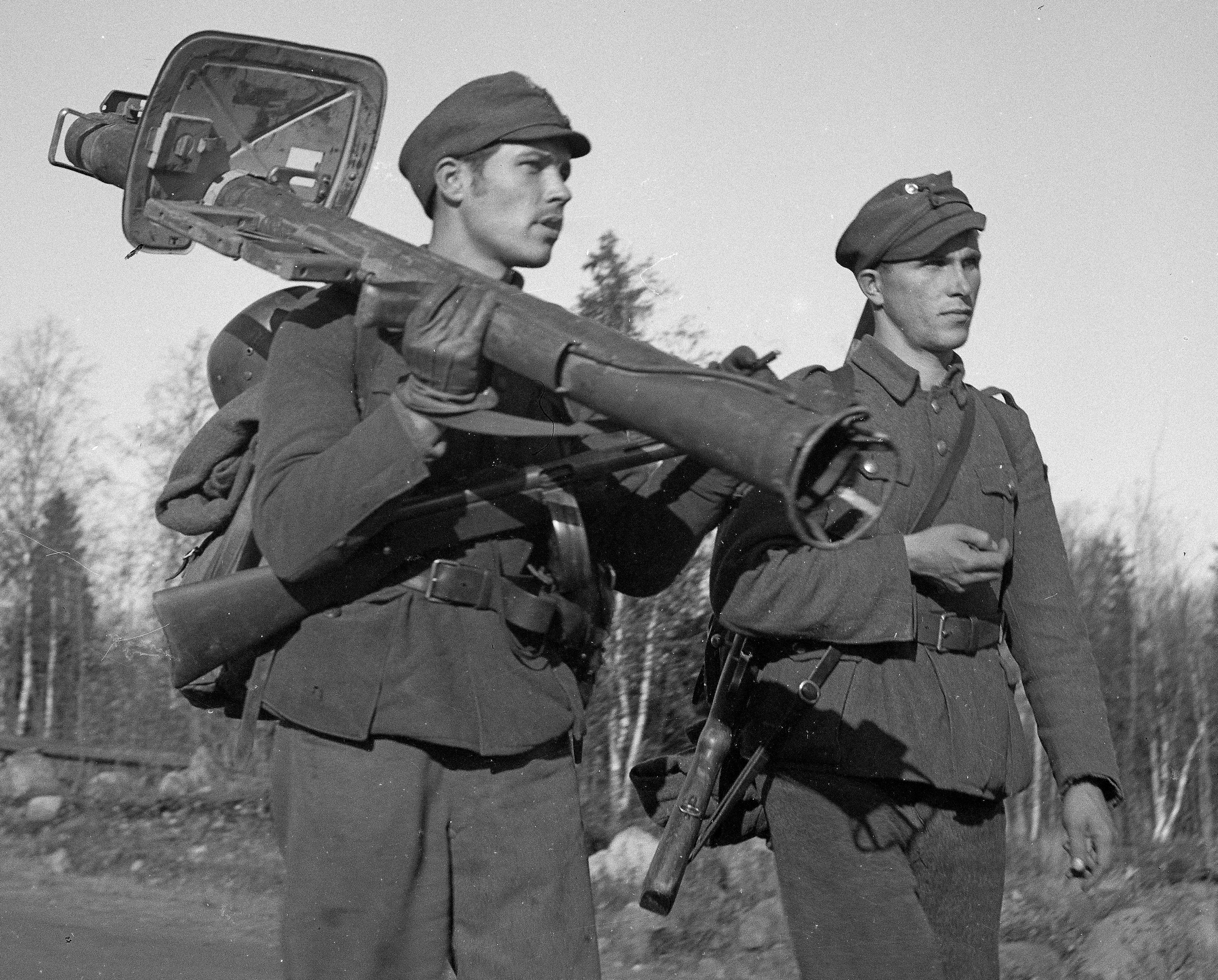
Finnish antitank patrol armed with Panzerschreck during the Lapland War

- Nazi Germany
- Italian Social Republic
- (Kingdom of Hungary) Hungary
- Finland
- Kingdom of Romania
- (Polish Underground State) Polish Home Army (captured weapons)
- Soviet Union (captured weapons)

== See also ==
- List of common World War II infantry weapons
- List of World War II firearms of Germany
- PIAT
- Rocket-propelled grenade
- RPG-2
- Shoulder-fired missile
