= List of Japanese World War II army bombs =

This is a complete list of all Aerial bombs used by the Imperial Japanese Army during the Second World War.

== Bombs ==
- Type 92 15 kg High-explosive bomb
- Type 99 30 kg High-explosive bomb
- Type 94 50 kg High-explosive bomb
- Type 94 100 kg High-explosive bomb
- Type 3 100 kg High-explosive bomb
- Type 94 Mod. 50 kg High-explosive bomb
- Type 94 Mod. 100 kg High-explosive bomb
- Type 1 50 kg High-explosive bomb
- Type 1 100 kg High-explosive bomb
- Type 1 250 kg High-explosive bomb
- Type 92 250 kg High-explosive bomb
- Type 92 500 kg High-explosive bomb
- Type 4456 100 kg Skipping bomb
- Type 3 250 kg Skipping bomb
- Type 4 100 kg Anti-shipping bomb
- Type 4 250 kg Anti-shipping bomb
- Type 4 500 kg Anti-shipping bomb

=== Fire bombs ===
- 1 kg thermite incendiary bomb
- 5 kg thermite incendiary bomb
- Type 97 50 kg Incendiary bomb
- Type 100 50 kg Incendiary bomb

=== Smoke bombs ===
- Type 100 50 kg smoke bomb

=== Gas bomb ===
- Type 92 50 kg gas bomb

=== Flares ===
- Type 90 parachute flare
- Type 1 12 kg parachute flare
- Type 3 parachute flare

=== Concrete Bombs ===
- Type 97 concrete bomb
- Type 94 substitute bomb
- Type 1 30 kg substitute bomb

=== Practice bomb ===
- Type 95 4 kg practice bomb

=== Cluster bomb ===
- Type 2⅓ kg cluster bomb
- Type 3½ kg cluster bomb
- Type 2½ kg cluster bomb
- Container for Type 2⅓ kg cluster bombs
- Container for 76 Type 2⅓ kg cluster bombs
- Container for 63 Type 3½ kg cluster bombs
- Type 1 1 kg aircraft missile
- 50 kg pamphlet container
- 100 kg pamphlet container

== See also ==
- List of Japanese World War II navy bombs
