= List of Dutch regiments in World War II =

The Netherlands was a minor country in World War II. It surrendered within five days after the start of hostilities, but the Germans were impressed by the tenacity of resistance. Evading capture, some officers escaped to Great Britain, continuing to resist the Germans. This article is based on one source, which lists and numbers regiments of the Dutch Armed Forces.

== Structure of a Division ==
This is the structure of an Infantry Division in 1940 of the Dutch Armed Forces:

- 3 Regiments (each with an organic strength of 2,691 men)
- 324 Machine Guns (216 Light M20, 108 Schwarzlose M08/15)
- 18 Heavy Mortars
- 12 Anti-tank guns
- 32 Artillery pieces

== Regiments ==
There were 48 Infantry Regiments and 27 Artillery Regiments of the Dutch Armed Forces of 1940. Three regiments in turn formed a Division. And two divisions and two artillery regiments formed an Army Corps. Over 90% of the Dutch Army consisted of conscripts, with just about 250,000 men in total to resist the Germans. There were also three independent infantry brigades, each with a strength of 5,000 men.

=== Field Army ===
Infantry Regiments numbered from 1 through 24, and Artillery Regiments from 1 through 12 formed the bulk of the Army in the field. The regiments in the Field Army were the best equipped, and were made up in numbers mostly of young conscripts.

==== Infantry Regiments ====
- 1st Infantry Regiment
- 2nd Infantry Regiment
- 3rd Infantry Regiment
- 4th Infantry Regiment
- 5th Infantry Regiment
- 6th Infantry Regiment
- 7th Infantry Regiment
- 8th Infantry Regiment
- 9th Infantry Regiment
- 10th Infantry Regiment
- 11th Infantry Regiment
- 12th Infantry Regiment
- 13th Infantry Regiment
- 14th Infantry Regiment
- 15th Infantry Regiment
- 16th Infantry Regiment
- 17th Infantry Regiment
- 18th Infantry Regiment
- 19th Infantry Regiment
- 20th Infantry Regiment
- 21st Infantry Regiment
- 22nd Infantry Regiment
- 23rd Infantry Regiment
- 24th Infantry Regiment

==== Artillery Regiments ====
- 1st Artillery Regiment
- 2nd Artillery Regiment
- 3rd Artillery Regiment
- 4th Artillery Regiment
- 5th Artillery Regiment
- 6th Artillery Regiment
- 7th Artillery Regiment
- 8th Artillery Regiment
- 9th Artillery Regiment
- 10th Artillery Regiment
- 11th Artillery Regiment
- 12th Artillery Regiment

=== Reserve Regiments ===
These regiments served as reserve, training, and garrisons across the Netherlands. Infantry regiments from 25 through 48 filled the reserve, also with artillery regiments from 13 through 27.

==== Infantry Regiments ====
- 25th Infantry Regiment
- 26th Infantry Regiment
- 27th Infantry Regiment
- 28th Infantry Regiment
- 29th Infantry Regiment
- 30th Infantry Regiment
- 31st Infantry Regiment
- 32nd Infantry Regiment
- 33rd Infantry Regiment
- 34th Infantry Regiment
- 35th Infantry Regiment
- 36th Infantry Regiment
- 37th Infantry Regiment
- 38th Infantry Regiment
- 39th Infantry Regiment
- 40th Infantry Regiment
- 41st Infantry Regiment
- 42nd Infantry Regiment
- 43rd Infantry Regiment
- 44th Infantry Regiment
- 45th Infantry Regiment
- 46th Infantry Regiment
- 47th Infantry Regiment
- 48th Infantry Regiment

==== Artillery Regiments ====
- 12th Artillery Regiment
- 13th Artillery Regiment
- 14th Artillery Regiment
- 15th Artillery Regiment
- 16th Artillery Regiment
- 17th Artillery Regiment
- 18th Artillery Regiment
- 19th Artillery Regiment
- 20th Artillery Regiment
- 21st Artillery Regiment
- 22nd Artillery Regiment
- 23rd Artillery Regiment
- 24th Artillery Regiment
- 25th Artillery Regiment
- 26th Artillery Regiment
- 27th Artillery Regiment

== Border Infantry Units ==
With 25 Battalions and 16 companies, the Border Infantry were Infantry that were deployed to slow down a German attack; if the Dutch government had not completed mobilization in 1940, at least some resistance could be offered. A few Border Infantry battalions were deployed along the Dutch coast, along with a few garrisons on the islands. Most of the Border Infantry were deployed on the eastern and southern borders with Germany and Belgium. A border Infantry company or battalion could be better equipped than an average Infantry Battalion, reinforced with some obsolete 56 mm field guns. The total number of personnel was around 20,000.

=== Battalions ===
- 1st Border Infantry Battalion
- 2nd Border Infantry Battalion
- 3rd Border Infantry Battalion
- 4th Border Infantry Battalion
- 5th Border Infantry Battalion
- 6th Border Infantry Battalion
- 7th Border Infantry Battalion
- 8th Border Infantry Battalion
- 9th Border Infantry Battalion
- 10th Border Infantry Battalion
- 11th Border Infantry Battalion
- 12th Border Infantry Battalion
- 13th Border Infantry Battalion
- 14th Border Infantry Battalion
- 15th Border Infantry Battalion
- 16th Border Infantry Battalion
- 17th Border Infantry Battalion
- 18th Border Infantry Battalion
- 19th Border Infantry Battalion
- 20th Border Infantry Battalion
- 21st Border Infantry Battalion
- 22nd Border Infantry Battalion
- 23rd Border Infantry Battalion
- 24th Border Infantry Battalion
- 25th Border Infantry Battalion

=== Companies ===
The Dutch had to resort to company sized forces when conscripts were in short supply. There were sixteen companies.

- 1st Border Infantry Company
- 2nd Border Infantry Company
- 3rd Border Infantry Company
- 4th Border Infantry Company
- 5th Border Infantry Company
- 6th Border Infantry Company
- 7th Border Infantry Company
- 8th Border Infantry Company
- 9th Border Infantry Company
- 10th Border Infantry Company
- 11th Border Infantry Company
- 12th Border Infantry Company
- 13th Border Infantry Company
- 14th Border Infantry Company
- 15th Border Infantry Company
- 16th Border Infantry Company
