= Battle of Paderborn =

WWII battle in Germany

- Part of the Western Allied invasion of Germany in the Western Front of the European theatre of World War II
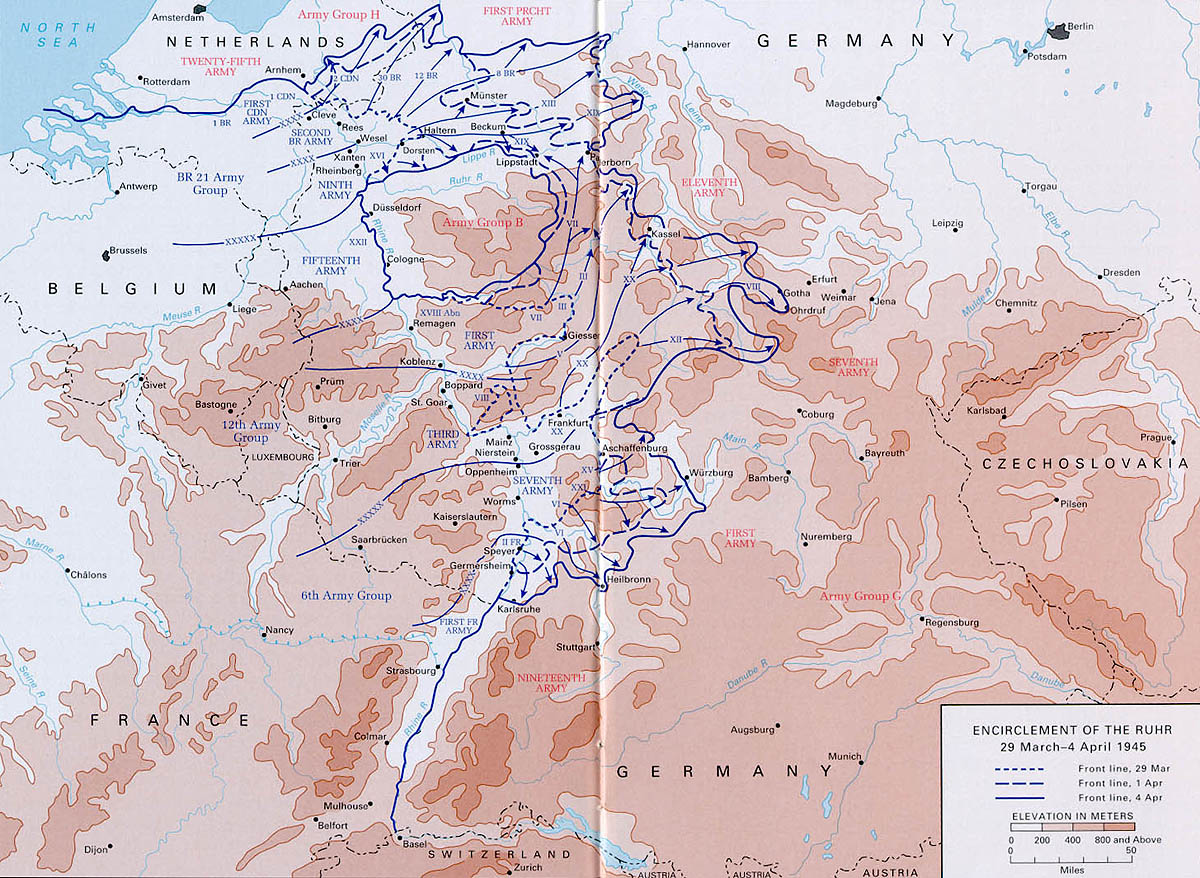
| Date | 30–31 March 1945 |
| Location | Paderborn, Germany |
| Result | American victory |

Belligerents
| United States | Germany |

Commanders and leaders
| (United States) Maurice Rose † (United States) Doyle Hickey (United States) Terry de la Mesa Allen Sr. | (Nazi Germany) Hans Stern (Nazi Germany) Wolf Koltermann |

Units involved
| (United States) 3rd Armored Division (United States) 104th Infantry Division | (Nazi Germany) Heavy Tank Battalion (Nazi Germany) 507th Heavy Panzer Battalion |

Strength
| 3 Combat Commands | 60 tanks |

Casualties and losses
| 17 M4 tanks destroyed 1 M-36 destroyed 17 half-tracks destroyed | 3 Tiger II tanks destroyed |

The Battle of Paderborn occurred during the Western Allied invasion of Germany. Most notably the commander of the 3rd Armored Division Major General Maurice Rose was killed in an ambush outside of Paderborn on March 30. He was the highest ranking US General to be killed in action on the Western Front of World War II.

== Prelude ==
During the final weeks of March, American forces were racing into Germany, with George Patton's 3rd Army crossing the Rhine river and the 1st Army fighting for the Remagen bridgehead. Field Marshal Bernard Montgomery's 21st Army Group was also crossing the last natural barrier into the Ruhr Area.
