= List of Japanese World War II navy bombs =

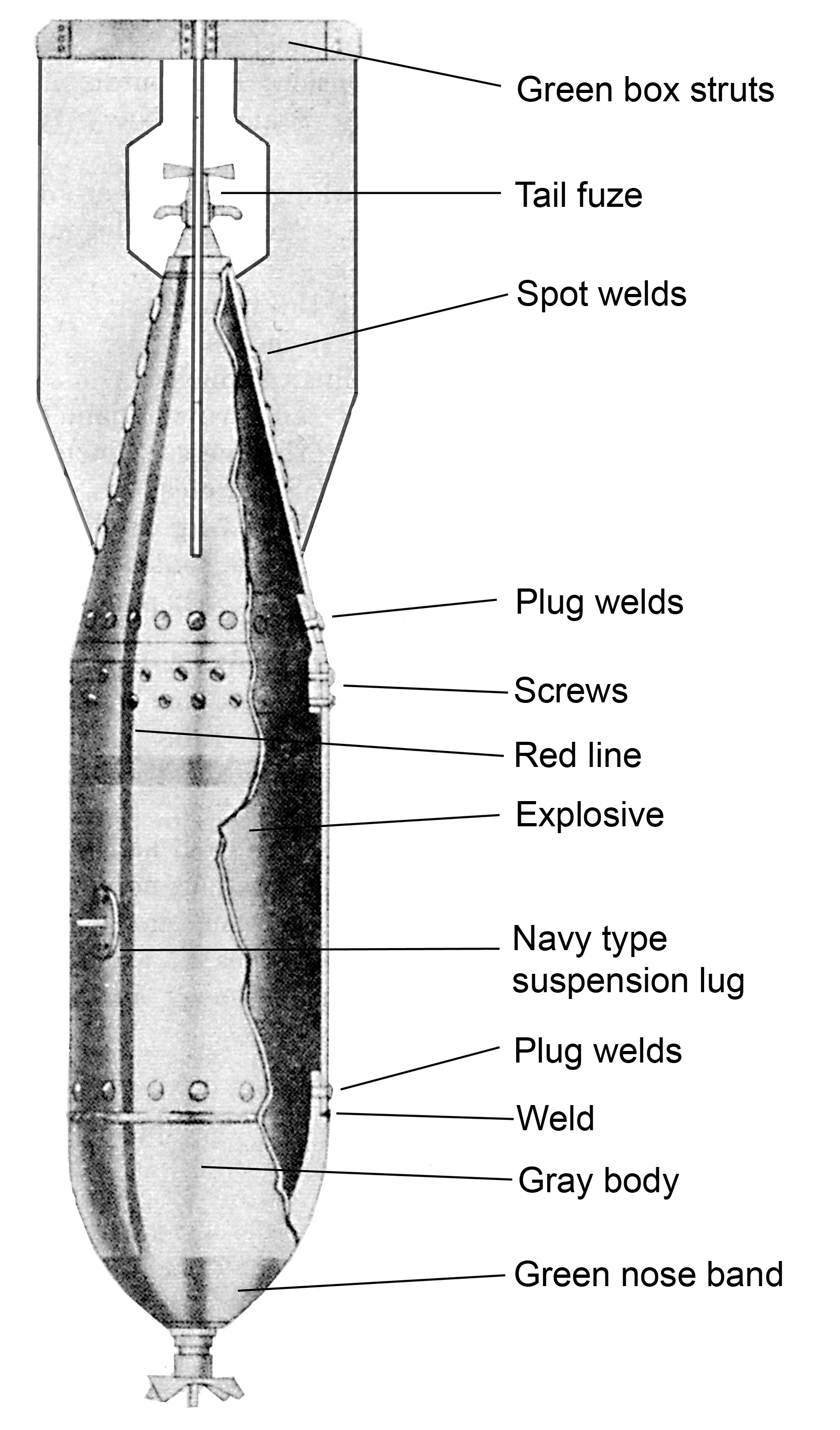
A diagram of a Type 98 No.25 "Land Bomb" showing the typical construction of Japanese Navy land bombs, a thin walled steel cylinder with a nose and tail screwed and welded on.

This is a complete list of all aerial bombs used by the Imperial Japanese Navy during the Second World War.

== Types ==
The Japanese navy produced a large number of different types of bombs, these were sub-divided into three main categories:

- Land bombs - for use against land targets. They were normally not produced to a high standard consisting of a simple cylindrical case, riveted or welded to a cast steel nose.
- Ordinary bombs - for use against ships. They were produced in general purpose and semi-armor-piercing types. They were of higher quality and generally had a smooth machined case
- Special bombs - for various purposes.

== Color coding system ==
Bomb type/ mark	Marking scheme				Alternate marking scheme				Purpose
Bomb type/ mark	Nose color / band color	Body color	Tail color	Body band color	Nose color / band color	Body color	Tail color	Body band color	Purpose
Land	Green	Grey	Green	Blue	Green / Blue	Grey	Grey	-	Land targets.
Ordinary	Green	Grey	Green	-	Green / Blue	Grey	Grey	-	Ship targets.
Dummy	Green / Black	White	White	-				-	Dummy bomb
Practice	Green	Black	White	-	Green / Black	White	White	-	Training.
Training	Black overall				-	-	-	-	Training.
Smoke	Green / Black	Grey	Grey	-	-	-	-	-	For concealing ships.
Mark 1	Green / Yellow	Grey	Yellow	-	-	-	-	-	Chemical gas bomb.
Mark 2	Blue	Grey	Blue	-	Green / Blue	Grey	Grey	-	Anti-submarine.
Mark 3	Silver	Grey	Silver	-	Green / Silver	Grey	Red	-	For air-to-air bombing.
Mark 4	Green / White	Grey	Red	-	-	-	-	-	Rocket bomb. For dive bombing capital ships.
Mark 5	Green / White	Grey	Grey	-	-	-	-	-	Armor-piercing bomb. For use against capital ships.
Mark 6	Green / Red	Grey	Red	-	-	-	-	-	Incendiary.
Mark 7	Green / Purple	Grey	Purple	-	-	-	-	-	Bacillus bomb.
Mark 8	Green / Brown	Grey	Grey	-	-	-	-	-	Anti-shipping skip bomb
Mark 19	-	-	-	-	-	-	-	-	Special bomb used by fighters against bomber formations, redesignated as Mark 28
Mark 21	Green / Brown	Grey	Grey	-	-	-	-	-	Cluster of small bombs
Mark 22	-	-	-	-	-	-	-	-	Cluster of spike bombs
Mark 23	Green / Brown	Grey	Grey	-	-	-	-	-	Time delay bomb
Mark 24	-	-	-	-	-	-	-	-	Cluster of parachute bombs
Mark 25	-	-	-	-	-	-	-	-	Cluster of wedge bombs
Mark 26	-	-	-	-	-	-	-	-	Unproduced time bomb design.
Mark 27	Green / Silver	Grey/Red	-	-	-	-	-	-	Phosphorus rocket bomb for use against bomber formations.
Mark 28	Green / Brown	Silver	Red	-	-	-	-	-	Rocket type bomb 10 kg high-explosive.
Mark 31	Grey	Grey	Grey	-	-	-	-	-	Land type bomb. Uses an influence fuze.

== Bombs ==
Designation	Type	Weight	Content weight	Content type	Construction	Length	Suspension lugs	Nose	Tail	Fuze	Notes
No.6	Land Bomb	63.5 kg (140 lb)		Picric acid or later Type 98 explosive (mod 1)				Cast steel		Type 2 Model 2 mod 0 or mod 1	Obsolete during the war. Case is similar to the Type 99 No. 6 Mk. 2
Type 97 No.6	Land Bomb	56 kg (124 lb)	23 kg (50 lb)	Picric acid or Type 98 explosive	Welded and riveted 6.4 mm (1/4 in) steel	100 cm (40 in)	Horizontal navy type	Cast steel	20 cm (7 7/8 in) long sheet steel	A-3(a)	Capable of penetrating 200 mm of reinforced concrete
Type 2 No.6 Model 5	Land Bomb	60 kg (132 lb) (approx)		Five 7 kg high-explosive bombs with bursting charge	Sheet 1.6 mm (1/16 in) steel	110 cm (42 in)	Horizontal navy type	-	41 cm (16 1/4 in)	A-3 (a) or A-3 (b)	
No.25	Land Bomb	250 kg (550 lb)	150 kg (330 lb)	Type 98 explosive	Welded and riveted 6.4 mm (1/4 in) steel	180 cm (72 in)	Horizontal navy type	Cast steel	93 cm (36.5 in) long sheet steel	A-3 (a), A-3 (b), C-2 (a), C-1 (a)	Designed in 1938, production ceased early in the Second World War
Type 98 No.25	Land Bomb	241 kg (532 lb)	96 kg (211 lb)	Picric acid or Type 98 explosive	Welded and riveted 13 mm (1/2 in) steel	180 cm (72 in)	Horizontal navy type	Cast steel	83 cm (32.5 in) long sheet steel	A-3 (a), A-3 (b), C-2 (a), C-1 (a)	The bomb was used by Japanese forces at the Battle of Midway. Designed in 1937 adopted in 1938. Capable of penetrating 400 mm of reinforced concrete.
No.80	Land Bomb	800 kg (1,760 lb)	382 kg (842 lb)	Picric acid or Type 98 explosive	Welded and riveted 13 mm (1/2 in) steel	290 cm (113 in)	Horizontal, two guide studs, and carrying band	Cast steel	100 cm (41 in) long 3.2 mm (1/8 in) steel	A-1 (c), B-3 (b), A-3 (d)	The bomb was used by Japanese forces at the Battle of Midway. The bomb was designed in 1937 and adopted in 1938, and will penetrate 400 mm of reinforced concrete.
Type 99 No.25	Ordinary Bomb	250 kg (550 lb)	60 kg (132 lb)	Type 91 explosive (Trinitroanisol)	One piece of machine forged 19 mm (3/4 in) steel	170 cm (68 in)	Horizontal navy type	-	71 cm (28 in) long 1.6 mm (1/16 in) steel	A-3 (a), A-3 (b), B-2 (a)	Designed in 1938 and adopted in 1939, it is capable of penetrating 50 mm of armor.
Type 2 No. 50 Model 1	Ordinary Bomb	500 kg (1,100 lb)	67 kg (148 lb)	Cast blocks of Type 98 explosive	One piece of machine forged steel 25 to 191 mm (1 to 7.5 in) thick	200 cm (78 in)	Horizontal, two guide studs and suspension band	-	100 cm (39.5 in) long sheet steel	A-3 (f), B-2 (a)	Teardrop shaped
No.80 Model 1	Ordinary Bomb	830 kg (1,820 lb)	350 kg (770 lb)	Type 91 explosive	One piece of machine forged steel 19 mm (0.75 in) thick	283 cm (111.5 in)	Horizontal, two guide studs, and suspension band	-	120 cm (49 in) long 4.0 mm (5/32 in) thick steel	A-1 (c), A-3 (c), A-3 (d), tail: B-3 (b)	
No.3 Model 2	Ordinary Bomb	32 kg (70 lb)	?	Picric acid	One piece of machined steel	84 cm (33 in)	Horizontal stud on either side of the body	-	33.7 cm (13.25 in)	A-1 (a), A-3 (a)	Teardrop shaped. Obsolete since the early stages of the war.
No.6 Model 2	Ordinary Bomb	63 kg (139 lb)	29 kg (65 lb)	Picric acid	One piece of machined steel	108 cm (42.5 in)	Horizontal stud on either side of the body	-	43 cm (17 in)	A-1 (a), A-3 (a)	Teardrop shaped. Production ceased sometime between 1940 and 1941, although they continued to be used.
No.25 Model 2	Ordinary Bomb	253 kg (557 lb)	103 kg (228 lb)	Picric acid	One piece of machined steel 16 mm (5/8 in) thick	182 cm (71.5 in)	Horizontal, navy type	-	69 cm (27 in)	A-3 (a), B-3 (a)	Teardrop shaped. The bomb was used by Japanese forces at the Battle of Midway
No.50 Model 2	Ordinary Bomb	490 kg (1,080 lb)	207.5 kg (457.5 lb)	Type 98 explosive	One piece of machined steel 102 to 13 mm (4 to 0.5 in) thick	230 cm (90 in)	Horizontal, two guide studs and suspension band	-	84 cm (33 in)	A-3 (a), B-3 (a)	Teardrop shaped
Type 99 No.6 Mk 2	-	64 kg (140 lb)	39 kg (85 lb)	Type 98 explosive	Cast nose plug welded to a 4.8 mm (3/16 in) thick cylindrical body	110 cm (42 in)	Horizontal, two guide studs and suspension band	-	53 cm (21 in)	A-3 (a)	A Mod 1 version of the bomb was also produced with a cylindrical steel anti-ricochet attachment spot welded to the nose giving it a blunt profile.
Type 1 No.25 Mk 2 Model 1	-	259 kg (572 lb)	144 kg (317 lb)	Type 98 explosive	Cast nose welded to a 6.4 mm (1/4 in) thick cylindrical body	180 cm (72 in)	Horizontal, two guide studs and suspension band	-	55 cm (21.5 in) followed by a 38 cm (15 in) plywood extension	A-3 (a), B-3 (a)	A Mod 1 version of the bomb was also produced with a cylindrical steel anti-ricochet attachment spot welded to the nose giving it a blunt profile.
Type 99 No.80 Mk 5	Armor-piercing	744 kg (1,641 lb)	30 kg (66 lb)	Type 91 explosive	Single piece of machined forged steel 100 mm (4 in) thick at the nose and 51 mm (2 in) at the tail	243 cm (95.5 in)	Two guide studs and suspension band	-	110 cm (43 3/8 in)	Two B-2 (b) tail fuzes	Tear drop shaped bomb, eight recesses around the nose could allow the fitting of a wind shield if used as a projectile. Adopted in 1941, basically a converted 40 cm AP shell, capable of penetrating 150 mm of armor.
Type 2 No.80 Mk 5	Armor-piercing	800 kg (1,760 lb) (approx)	45 kg (100 lb) (approx)	Type 91 explosive	Single piece of machined forged steel			-		Two B-2 (b) tail fuzes	Intended to supersede the Type 99 No.80. Not produced in large numbers. Designed in 1939, and adopted in 1942.
Type 3 No.150 Mk 5	Armor-piercing	1,500 kg (3,300 lb) (approx)	91 kg (200 lb) (approx)	Type 91 explosive	Single piece of machined forged steel			-		Two B-2 (b) type tail fuzes	Intended to supersede the Type 99 No.80. Not produced in large numbers. Designed in 1942 and tested in 1944, was in experimental production at the end of the war.
Type 3 No.25 Mk 8 model 1		294 kg (649 lb) (approx)	119 kg (263 lb) (approx)	Type 97 explosive	Cast steel nose, welded to cylindrical body 13 mm (0.5 in) thick	170 cm (67 in)	Horizontal type navy	Cast steel	70 cm (27 3/8 in) long	A-3 (a)	
Type 3 No.6 Mk 23 model 1		65 kg (143 lb) (approx)	23 kg (50 lb) (approx)	Type 98 explosive or Picric acid	Cast steel nose, welded and riveted to cylindrical body 6.4 mm (0.25 in) thick	103.5 cm (40.75 in)	Normal type navy	Cast steel with anti-riccochet cone	47 cm (18 1/2 in) inches long	C-2 (a)	
Type 4 No.25 Mk 29	Air-to-air bomb	-	-	Explosive with white phosphorus filled steel pellets	Sheet steel with wooden blocks in the nose	-	-	-	-	D-2(a) fuze	Under development at the end of the war to replace No.25 Mk 3 for use against bomber formations, having a larger explosive charge and less incendiary shrapnel.
Type 3 No.25 Mk 31 Model 1	Airburst	171 kg (378 lb)	79 kg (175 lb)	Type 98 explosive	Sheet steel cylinder 13 mm (0.5 in) thick with blunt nose	160 cm (62 in)	Normal navy type	Blunt steel with flange	81 cm (32 in)	Type 3 electric firing device B-3(a)	Type 3 fuze triggers the bomb at a height of about 7 meters using an electro optical sensor.
Type 3 No.80 Mk 31 Model 1	Airburst	718 kg (1,584 lb)	418 kg (922 lb)	Type 98 explosive cast into blocks	Sheet steel cylinder 14 mm (9/16 in) thick with blunt nose	290 cm (113 in)	Two guide studs and a suspension band	Blunt steel with flange	100 cm (41 in)	Type 3 electric firing device B-3(b)	Type 3 fuze triggers the bomb at a height of about 7 meters using an electro optical sensor.
Type 5 No.25 Mk 33	Airburst	-	-	Explosive with a layer of cylindrical steel fragments	-	-	-	Rounded with plummet fuze holder	-	Plummet electrical fuze with backup Type 15 model 2 fuze	The bomb uses four retarding drogue plates that are opened by an atmospheric pressure fuze to slow descent and release the all-ways plummet fuze, which is suspended by a twenty-meter silk-clad copper to the main bomb. When the plummet fuze touches the ground the bomb is triggered.

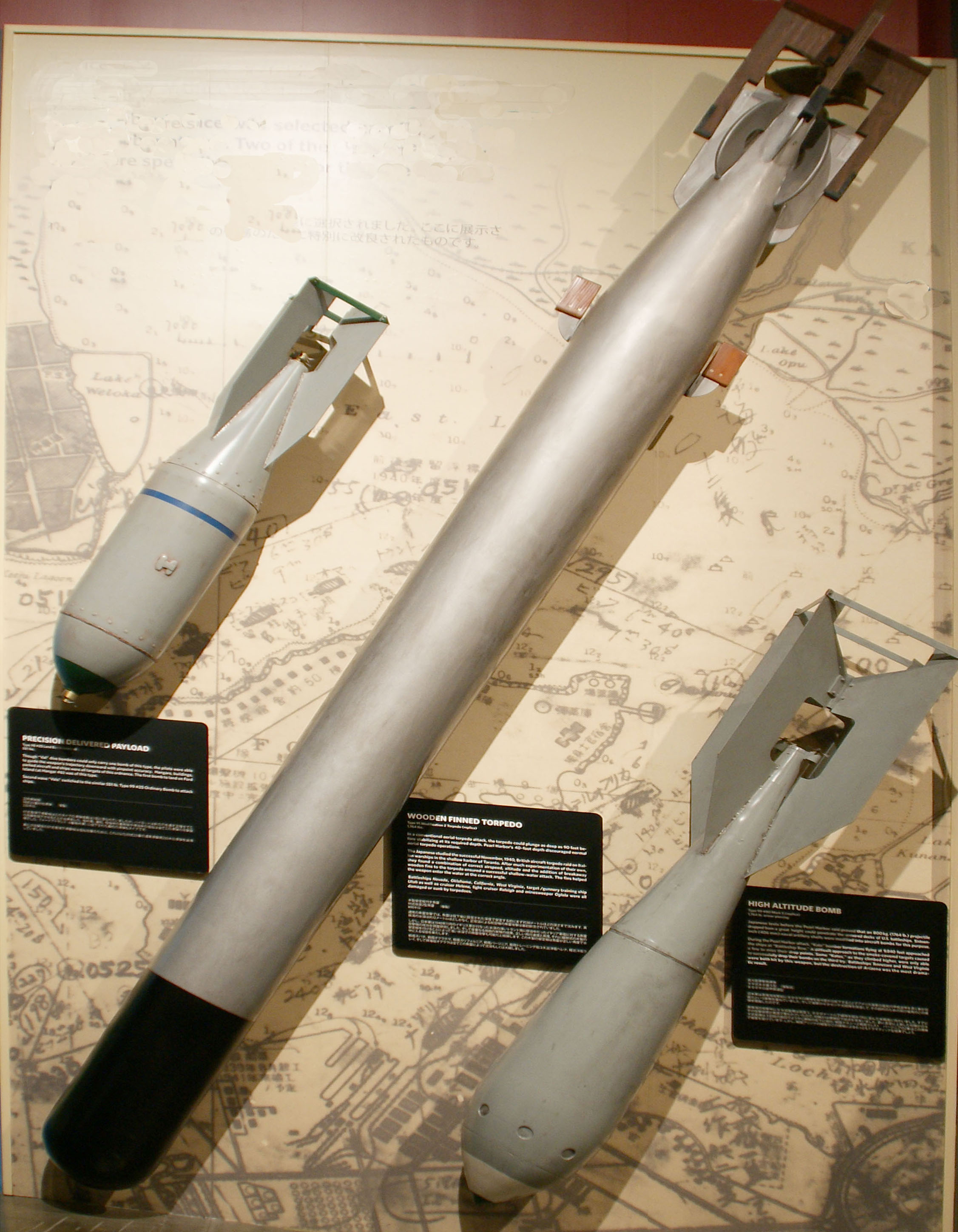
Ordnance used in Pearl Harbor attack. Left: Type 98 #25 land bomb. Middle: Type 91 modification 2 Torpedo. Right: Type 99 #80 Mark 5 High-altitude armor-piercing bomb.

=== Rocket bombs ===
The Japanese produced a number of bombs with rocket motors installed, intended for air-to-air use against bomber formations, or as armor-piercing weapons. Only two saw service, the Type 3 No.25 Mk 4 armor-piercing rocket bomb, and the Type 3 No.6 Mk.27 air-to-air rocket bomb.

Model	Weight	Description
Type 3 No.25 Mk 4 Mod 1	315 kg	Work on this design began in 1935 and production commenced in 1943. 1.9 meters long, the bomb is an armor-piercing design, with a thick forged steel nose. The bomb attained a speed of about 100 meters per second when launched. The principal drawback was the small 3.5-kilogram bursting charge.
Type 5 No.1 Mk 9 Mod 1	15 kg (33 lb)	An experimental design, intended for use against surfaced submarines. The bomb carried 1 kilogram (2.2 lb) of explosives, and had a velocity of about 230 meters per second. Experiments were conducted in June 1944, and it was adopted in 1945. Production had started at the end of the war, but it had not been used. Capable of penetrating up to 25 mm of armor.
Type 3 No.6 Mk 9	84 kg (185 lb)	An experimental design, intended for use against landing craft and small ships. The bomb carried 10 kg (22 lb) of explosives, and had a velocity of about 230 meters per second.
Type 3 No.6 Mk 27	66 kg (145 lb)	An anti-aircraft rocket that replaced the Type 99 No.3 Mk.3 in air-to-air bombing. It consisted of a large rocket motor with a 2.5 kg (5.5 lb) incendiary shrapnel warhead triggered by a clockwork time fuze with an adjustable delay of up to 10 seconds. The rocket had a maximum velocity of around 270 m/s, and the warhead contained 140 iron pellets with white phosphorus embedded in them, these were scattered in a 60 degree cone when the warhead was triggered. The bomb was designed in January 1944 and adopted in February 1945.
Type 3 No.1 Mk 28	9.1 kg (20 lb)	An experimental anti-aircraft rocket with a 600 g (1.32 lb) high-explosive warhead. Experiments were conducted in late 1944. This rocket used 2 kg of propellent and had a maximum velocity of 400 m/s.

=== Incendiary bombs ===
- Type 99 No.3 Mk 3
- Type 3 No.6 Mk 3 bomb model 1
- Type 2 No.25 Mk 3 bomb model 1
- Type 98 No.7 Mk 6 bomb model 1
- Type 98 No.7 Mk 6 bomb model 2
- Type 1 No.7 Mk 6 bomb model 3 mod 1
- Type 45 No.44 Mk 6 bomb model 1

=== Gas bombs ===
- No. 6 Mk 1
- Type 1 No.6 Mk.1
- Type 4 No.6 Mk 1

=== Cluster type bombs ===
- Type 2 No.6 Mk 21 bomb model 1
- Type 2 No.6 Mk 21 bomb model 2
- 1 kg hollow-charge bomb
- 1 kg anti-personnel bomb

=== Practice bombs ===
- 1 kg Practice bomb Mod 2
- 1 kg Practice bomb Mod 3
- No.3 Practice bomb Model 1
- Type 99 No.3 Practice bomb

=== Flares ===
- Type 96 landing flare
- Landing flare
- 5 kg parachute flare Model 2 mod 1
- Type 0 parachute flare Model 1
- Type 0 parachute flare Model 1 mod 1
- Type 0 parachute flare Model 2
- Type 0 parachute flare Model 3 mod 1
- Experimental model 11 parachute flare
- Type 94 float light
- Experimental float light
- Type 94 model 2 float light
- Type 0 model 1 float light

=== Smoke floats and markers ===
- 2 kg smoke float
- 43 kg smoke float
- Type 0 Model 1 sea marker
- Type 0 Model 2 sea marker
- Cardboard type sea marker
- Type 3 No.6 target marker bomb
- Type 2 2 kg target indicator

=== Misc ===
- 2 kg Window (Chaff) bomb

== Fuzes ==
Japanese Navy bomb fuzes designation system was unknown to the Allies until after the end of the Second World War. As a result, a designation system was created to describe the fuzes as follows. It consists of a capital letter, a numeral and a lower-case parenthetical letter.

The capital letter designates the fuzes type as follows:

- A - nose impact
- B - tail impact
- C - long delay fuze
- D - airburst fuze
- E - protective fuze

The numeral approximates the order in which the fuzes were captured by the allies. Finally the lower-case letter in parentheses indicates the different but similar designs.

Where possible the original Japanese designation is given.

- A-1(a)
- A-1(b)
- A-1(c)
- A-3(a) Type 97 Mk 2 nose fuze
- A-3(b) Type 1 nose fuze model 2
- A-3(c) Type 2 nose indicator
- A-3(d) Type 97 Mk 2 nose fuze Model 1
- A-3(e) Type 3 nose indicator
- A-3(f) Type 2 No.50 Ordinary bomb fuze model 1
- A-3(g)
- A-5(a)
- B-2(a) Type 99 No.25 Ordinary bomb fuze
- B-2(b) Type 99 No.80 Mk 5 Bomb fuze
- B-3(a) Type 15 tail fuze model 2
- B-3(b) Type 15 tail fuze model 1
- B-5(b)
- B-5(c)
- B-6(a) Type 97 rail initiator
- B-9(a) tail fuze
- B-10(a) tail fuze
- C-1(a) Type 99 special bomb fuze
- C-2(a) Type 99 special bomb nose fuze
- D-2(a)
- D-2(b)
- D-2(c)
- D-3(a)
- D-4(a) parachute flare fuze
- Type 3 electric firing device

== See also ==
- List of Japanese World War II army bombs
