= List of diplomatic missions during World War II =

Below is a list of diplomatic missions during World War II that were undertaken by the allied forces.

- Arcadia (1941) — Washington Conference between President of the United States Franklin D. Roosevelt and Prime Minister of the United Kingdom Winston Churchill
- Argonaut (1945) — linked sequence of conferences
  - Cricket (1945) — pre-Yalta Conference in Malta between Franklin D. Roosevelt and Winston Churchill
  - Magneto (1945) — Yalta Conference between Franklin D. Roosevelt, Premier of the Soviet Union Joseph Stalin and Winston Churchill
- Eureka (1943) — conference between Franklin D. Roosevelt, Winston Churchill and Joseph Stalin at Tehran
- Octagon (1944) — conference between Franklin D. Roosevelt and Winston Churchill at Quebec City to discuss Morgenthau Plan
- Quadrant (1943) — conference between Franklin D. Roosevelt and Winston Churchill at Quebec City
- Riviera (1941) — Franklin D. Roosevelt/Winston Churchill conference at Placentia Bay, Newfoundland
- Sextant 1 (1943) — conference between Franklin D. Roosevelt, Winston Churchill and Premier of China Chiang Kai-shek at Cairo
- Sextant 2 (1943) — conference between Franklin D. Roosevelt, Winston Churchill and President of Turkey İsmet İnönü at Cairo
- Symbol (1943) — conference between Franklin D. Roosevelt, Winston Churchill and the leader of the Free French, Charles de Gaulle, at Casablanca
- Terminal (1945) — conference between Franklin D. Roosevelt, Winston Churchill, Clement Attlee and Joseph Stalin at Potsdam
- Trident (1943) — third Washington conference between Franklin D. Roosevelt and Churchill

== See also ==
- List of World War II military operations
