= List of strategic bombings over Germany in World War II =

A list of strategic bombing over Germany in World War II includes cities and towns in Germany attacked by RAF Bomber Command and the Eighth Air Force. This list is not complete.

== History ==
=== Defence of Germany ===
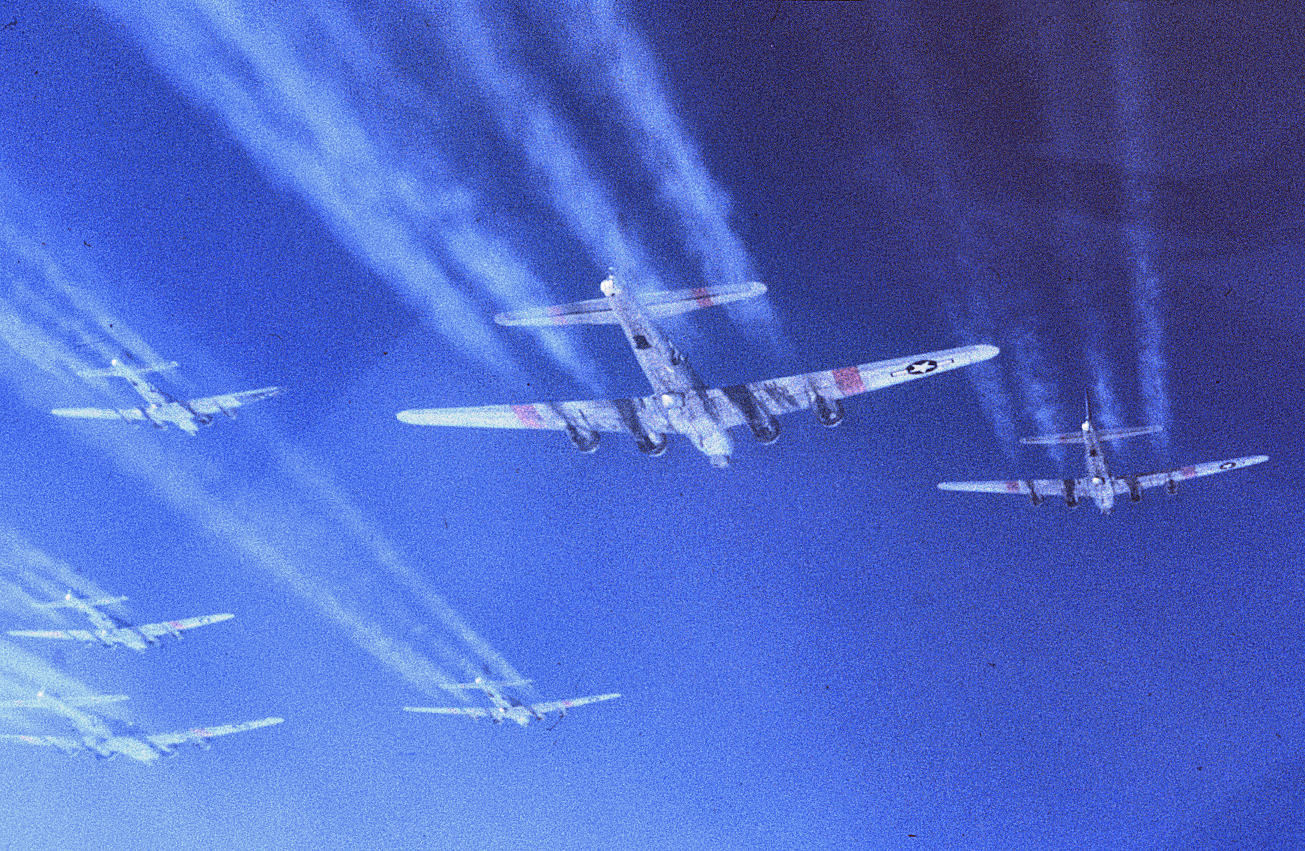
B-17G Flying Fortresses in formation

German defensive strategy of their country, and neighbouring occupied countries, against strategic bombing was conducted by the Defence of the Reich.

In February 1944, the RAF and USAAF air raids of Big Week notably limited the offensive capability of the Luftwaffe, from which it would never recover. On the first day of Big Week, 127 German fighters were shot down. The US lost 137 bombers and 28 fighters, with over 3,000 bomber sorties. 434 German fighter pilots were killed in February 1944, which was 17% of the total, and many were the more-experienced fighter pilots. The Luftwaffe lost 22% fighter pilots in March 1944, 20% in April and again in May 1944.

The Packard Automotive Plant made 55,500 Merlin engines, with the first from August 1941. The first Merlin Mustang flew in October 1942.

On March 4 1944 the P-51 first escorted bombers all the way to Berlin, from the 4th Fighter Group at RAF Debden in north-west Essex. William Ellsworth Kepner, in charge of VIII Fighter Command, oversaw the introduction of the long-range Mustang, and played a large part in getting drop tanks. 260,000 drop tanks were made by Bowater, under the leadership of Sir Eric Vansittart Bowater at Sittingbourne in Kent. The long-range Mustang did far more immediate damage to the Luftwaffe, than much of what the British or American bombers had done to aircraft factories until early 1944.

The German air defence had advanced radar and was often impenetrable, or only penetrable at great cost; only aircraft such as the de Havilland Mosquito could completely outwit the German defences; the Mosquito was almost impossible to shoot down, being able to outrun most German fighter aircraft too, and it carried no discernible defensive armament. Around fifteen German cities were firebombed, in which destruction of the cities was almost total; the temperatures created in the firestorm were huge. Many north-western German cities were bombed in late 1943 in the Battle of the Ruhr.

On 27 May 1940, a 10 Sqn Armstrong Whitworth Whitley on German raid, becomes first time that a RAF rear gunner shot down a German fighter. On 5 May 1943, the Republic P-47 Thunderbolt escorted for the first time. On 26 July 1944, the first time that a jet fighter shot down an aircraft occurred in air combat history, when a Me 262 shot down a reconnaissance Mosquito of 540 Sq.

=== Aerial navigation ===
In August 1942 the Germans now could jam the Gee navigation system frequencies. From January 1943 Oboe was deployed, and the Germans could not prevent Oboe navigation until January 1944, when an Oboe-equipped aircraft was shot down near Kleve, and eighty jamming transmitters were built in three days. The British changed the frequency of Oboe, but kept the old frequency broadcasting, and the Germans believed that their frequency-jamming was working as before.

=== Destruction ===
There were 1,440,000 bomber sorties over Germany, and 2,680,000 fighter aircraft sorties. Approximately 410,000 German civilians were killed in the strategic bombing. Within the 1937 borders of Germany, industrial capacity was greater at the end of the war than at the beginning. British and American raids often deliberately targeted the highly flammable medieval and early modern city centres, which had no military value. The raids intensified in the final months of the war, when Germany's defeat was effectively inevitable.

42 22,000lb Grand Slam devices were dropped over Germany.

== Strategic bombing ==
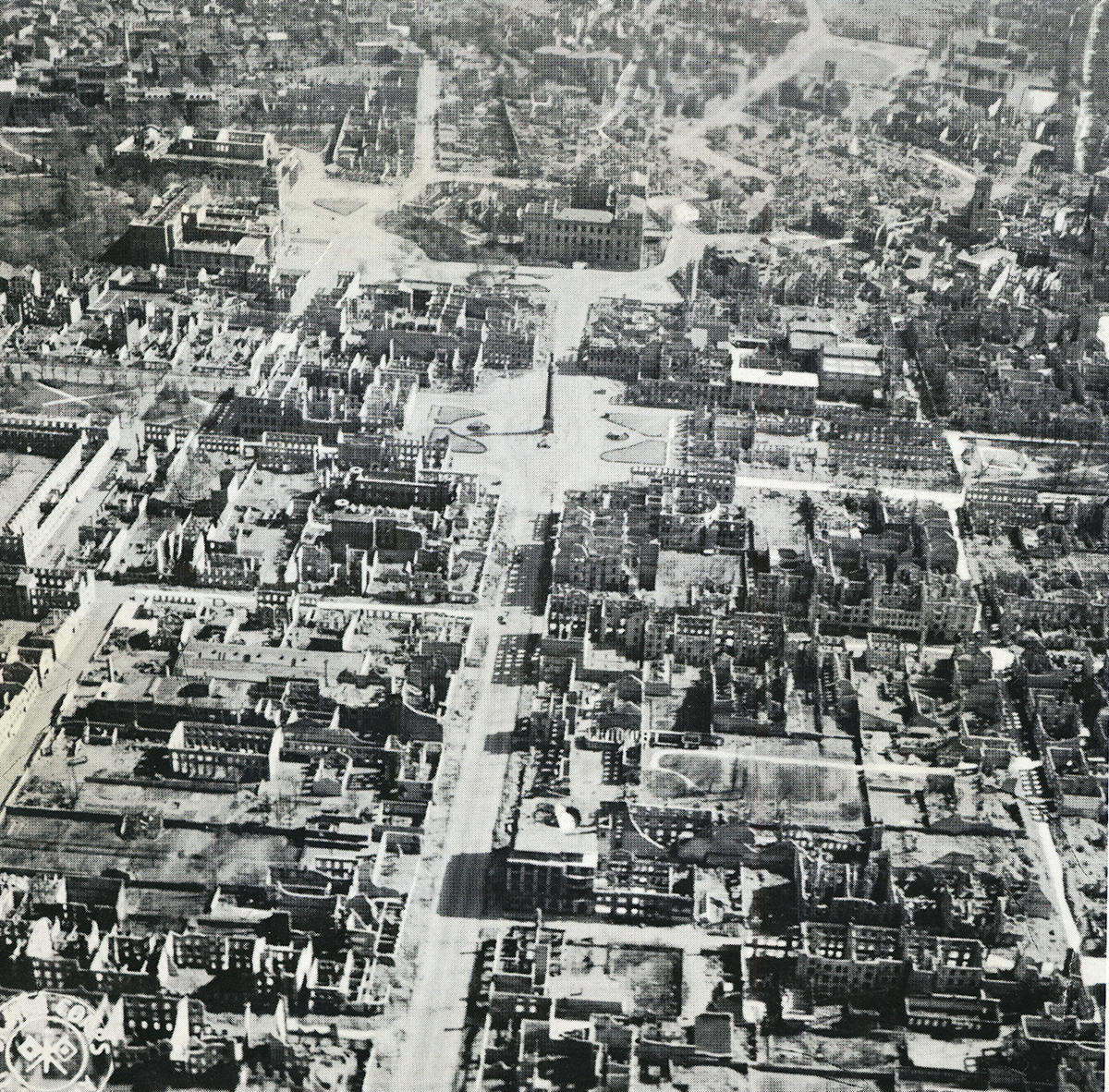
Darmstadt after the firebombing of 11 September 1944

=== B ===
- Bombing of Berlin in World War II; in the first four months of the RAF campaign, the RAF lost around 1,000 aircraft; the USAAF joined the Berlin campaign from March 1944, with Mustang fighter support; the Luftwaffe fighter pilots were deeply alarmed by the numbers of the Mustangs; on 6 March 1944, the first large US raid drops 1600 tons of bombs from 600 bombers, with around 160 of the 800 defending German fighters being shot down; the largest USAAF raid of the entire war, with 1,500 bombers of the Eighth Air Force, was on the morning of 3 February 1945, with 2,300 tons dropped, causing a firestorm, killing 2,500.
- Bombing of Braunschweig (15 October 1944); the main raid was on 14/15 October 1944 by No. 5 Group RAF and part of the 24-hour Operation Hurricane, where around 10,000 tons were dropped.
- Bombing of Bremen in World War II, on 13 April 1943, 115 B-17s destroy half of the Focke-Wulf factory; on 8 October 1943, the raid caused a firestorm.

=== C ===
- Bombing of Cologne in World War II, the morning raid of 31 May 1942 saw the operational debut of the Mosquito, when four Mosquitos of 105 Sqn take off from Norfolk.

=== D ===
- Bombing of Darmstadt in World War II; the raid on 11/12 September 1944 resulted in a firestorm; with 226 Lancasters of 5 Group and 14 Pathfinder Mosquitos.
- Bombing of Dortmund, on 12 March 1945, the largest raid of the whole war on one target, the RAF drops 4,851 tonnes, with 1108 aircraft, 748 Lancasters, 292 Halifaxes, and 68 Mosquitos, destroying 98% of the city centre; it began at 4.30pm, and lasted 29 minutes.
- Bombing of the Dortmund–Ems Canal; it was attacked numerous times due to its strategic importance for the German war economy.
  - Bombing of the Glane culverts, including Operation Garlic
  - Bombing of the Dortmund–Ems Canal near Greven
  - Bombing of the Kanalüberführung Münster–Gelmer
- Bombing of Dresden in World War II
- Bombing of Duisburg in World War II
- Bombing of Düsseldorf in World War II, on 12 June 1943 the raid resulted in a firestorm, with 783 aircraft - 326 Lancasters, 202 Halifaxes, 143 Wellingtons, 99 Stirlings, and 13 Mosquitos.

=== E ===
- Bombing of Emden, on 31 March 1941, the first 4,000lb cookie was dropped, and was the 37th raid on the town, dropped by two Wellingtons of 149 Sqn at RAF Mildenhall, piloted by Sqn Ldr K Wass and Pilot Off Franks; the propaganda film Target for Tonight was being filmed at this time at Mildenhall; the 4,000lb device was described as five-times more powerful than previous RAF ordnance; the largest raid on 6 September 1944, destroys 80% of the city.
- Bombing of Essen in World War II, on 8 March 1942 was the first carpet bombing raid by RAF, with the first electronic navigation of the RAF, with 211 aircraft, and the Gee radio navigation system; on 5 March 1943, there was a huge raid, with 160 acres destroyed in a firestorm; this was the first raid of the 'Battle of the Ruhr', with 442 aircraft; and from this moment on, due to advanced ground radar, the targets were mostly found; on 10 April 1943, the first 8,000lb ordnance was dropped, by a Halifax of 76 Sqn, piloted by Pilot Off M. Renault. The city had over two thousand flak guns, and was known as the best-defended German city.

=== H ===
- Bombing of Hamburg in World War II
- Bombings of Heilbronn in World War II, on 4 December 1944, 282 Lancasters of 5 Group, with 10 Pathfinder Mosquitos; the raid began at 7.30pm, with 1,200 tons dropped, killing 6,500, by 8pm the firestorm had begun.

=== K ===
- Bombing of Kassel in World War II; on the raid on 22 October 1943, Operation Corona was first implemented, whereby native German speakers would give confusing orders to the Luftwaffe fighter pilots from Hollywood Manor at West Kingsdown, Kent; the raid resulted in a firestorm, destroying 23 square miles; it was to destroy the Henschel & Son main tank factory, with 283 Liberators and 198 Mustangs; 29 German fighters were shot down; the Americans lost 31 Liberators and one Mustang near Seulingswald; it destroyed the Fieseler factory, which made the V-1, which the Germans had wanted to target London with, in January 1944, so the V-1 would have to be deployed later in June 1944; the Kassel Mission by the USAAF occurred on 27 September 1944, and was one of the largest air battles between the Luftwaffe and the USAAF, and 118 American aircrew were killed, of which 11 were murdered after parachuting to safety.
- Bombing of Königsberg in World War II
- Bombing of Krefeld in World War II, a firestorm was caused on 21 June 1943.

=== L ===
- Bombing of Leipzig in World War II, a firestorm was caused on 4 December 1943; 442 bombers dropped 1400 tons at 3.50 am in half an hour, which killed 1800.

=== M ===
- Bombing of Munich in World War II; the main raid was on 24/25 April 1944.

=== N ===
- Bombing of Nuremberg in World War II; on 2 January 1945, 521 Lancasters, with around 6,000 high-explosive bombs, a million incendiaries, caused a firestorm, destroying 90% of the Altstadt, killing 1835 people. Before the war 400,000 lived there, but after the war 200,000 lived there.

=== P ===
- Bombing of Pforzheim in World War II, on February 23, 1945, 17,600 people were killed, 31% of the population, when 367 Lancasters dropped bombs during twenty-two minutes from 7:50 pm.

=== S ===
- Bombing of Stuttgart in World War II, on 12 September 1944, 204 Lancasters, 1,200 people killed in a firestorm; it had also been heavily bombed in three raids at the end of July 1944.

=== W ===
- Bombing of Wilhelmshaven in World War II, 8 July 1941 sees the first operational deployment of the B-17, when three B-17s of 90 Sqn took off from RAF Polebrook; the first USAAF B-17 landed at RAF Prestwick on 1 July 1942; on 27 January 1943 it saw the first USAAF attack over Germany.
- Bombing of Wuppertal in World War II; the raid on 29–30 May 1943 caused a firestorm.
- Bombing of Würzburg in World War II, a firestorm was caused on 16 March 1945; it was chosen largely as the city centre was made of wood, 225 Lancasters from 5 Group and 11 Pathfinder Mosquitos began at 21.25, with Mosquitos of 627 Sqn beforehand; it dropped 582 tons of incendiaries.

== Recent unexploded bomb finds in Germany ==
Controlled explosion of a 250kg bomb on August 28 2012 in Schwabing, Munich

- June 22 1982, at Kleve, an unexploded bomb killed four children
- Thursday September 15 1994, three workers were killed, and 17 injured in Friedrichshain, Berlin, when a sheet piling rig caused an explosion near the Frankfurter Allee (Berlin U-Bahn) station. The body of one construction worker was hurled onto the top of a four-storey building
- Monday October 23 2006, on a motorway construction site at Aschaffenburg on the Bundesautobahn 3, in north-west Bavaria, an excavator driver, dug up a bomb, which exploded and killed him
- June 1 2010, in Göttingen, at a construction site of a sports stadium, during the operation to defuse the bomb, the 500kg bomb exploded, killing three of the bomb disposal unit, and injuring three others
- January 2014, Euskirchen, at a recycling company, a British 4,000lb 'cookie' bomb was discovered too late, and exploded, killing an excavator driver, and seriously injuring two others

== See also ==
- Category:World War II strategic bombing units
- List of strategic bombing over the United Kingdom in World War II
- Civilian casualties of strategic bombing
- List of air operations during the Battle of Europe
- Lists of World War II topics
