= List of strategic bombing over the United Kingdom in World War II =

A list of strategic bombing over the United Kingdom in World War II includes the towns and cities that received significant aerial destruction from 1940 to 1942 in the United Kingdom. After mid-1944 the Luftwaffe would struggle to defend their own skies.

== History ==
The main German bombing across the UK occurred until June 1941. Around 40,000 people were killed. The German raids began as daylight raids, but would later be mostly at night from September 1940 onwards.

The Luftwaffe dropped around 36,800 tonnes in 1940 and around 21,800 tonnes in 1941. It would drop around 3,000 tonnes per year from then on.

On 25 September 1944 the whereabouts of parachute mine explosions was first officially disclosed. Details of individual bombing was only revealed on Tuesday 10 October 1944.

== Strategic bombing ==
- Bombing of Belfast; the raid of 15 April 1941, killed over 1,000 people in the largest attack outside of London, at the time; the full moon was on April 11, 1941
- Bombing of Birmingham; Birmingham had many armaments factories, with aircraft and automotive factories; it began on 9 August 1940
- Bombing of Bristol; Bristol experienced bombing raids that traveled up the Bristol Avon from the Bristol Channel due to the strategic importance of the Bristol Harbour and the Bristol Aeroplane Company
- Bombing of Cardiff; Cardiff was a relatively straightforward city to find, being on the sea
- Bombing of Clydebank; second week in March 1941; carried on the day of a full moon
- Bombing of Coventry; mostly on 14 November 1940; in this raid, the first parachute mines in the UK were dropped, numbering 50; the full moon was on November 15, 1940
- Bombing of Exeter, the raid on 25 April 1942 was the first reprisal for the RAF bombing of sacrosanct historic German cities, which had been viewed as 'below the belt'

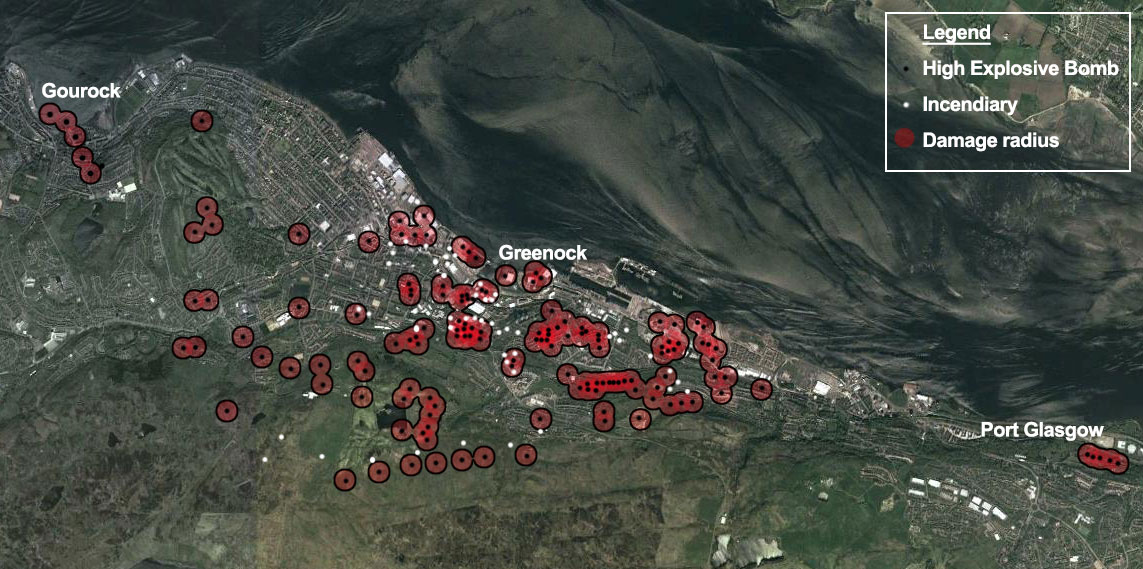
Greenock

- Bombing of Greenock; 6 and 7 May 1941
- Bombing of Kingston Upon Hull; Kingston upon Hull was the most severely damaged British city or town during the Second World War, with 95 percent of houses damaged.
- Bombing of Liverpool; Liverpool was the main port to receive cargo from the US, on 28 November 1940 a parachute mine hit the Junior Instructional Centre on Durning Road in Edge Hill, Liverpool, killing 164 people in the basement; up to April 1941 329 people were killed in Wallasey, 403 in Birkenhead, 152 in Bootle, and 1,263 in Liverpool; the worst week was the first week of May 1941, a week of moonlight, with a raid every night, up to 285 aircraft each night; 363 tons were dropped on 3 May 1941; 14,000 homes in Bootle, out of 17,000, were damaged; the full moon was on May 11, 1941

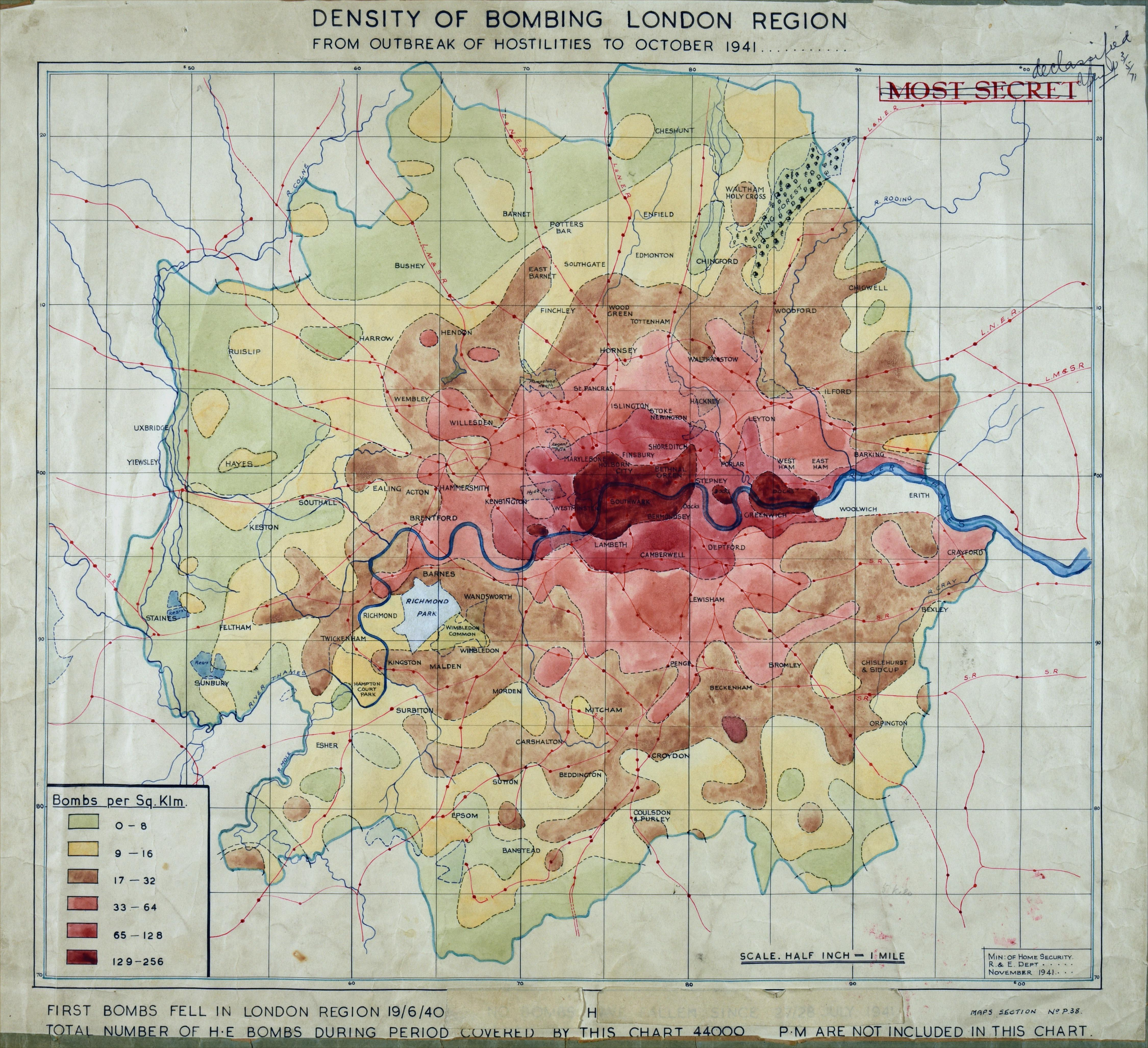
London region to October 1941

- Bombing of London - The Blitz; it began over London on 7 September 1940, and inadvertently gave the RAF Fighter Command airfields of South East England the time and unexpected opportunity to repair their much-damaged facilities; the Blitz ended on 11 May 1941; there was a large attack in March 1941, with other large attacks on 16 and 19 April 1941; on the raid of 10 May 1941, 1,436 people were killed, and it destroyed 11,000 houses, being the largest of the war, over the UK; between 2315hrs and 0524hrs, 507 aircraft from Luftflotten 2 and 3 dropped 711 tonnes of high explosive, with ten Luftwaffe aircraft lost; there was a large attack in January 1943; from 21 January (known as Unternehmen Mars) to 20 April 1944, the Germans launched Operation Steinbock against London, with 470 bomber aircraft, in a retaliation against the increasing nightly heavy raids against Berlin, coordinated by Generalmajor Dietrich Peltz; around 330 of these German aircraft would be shot down, at a rate of 77 per month; all that ultimately happened was that the Luftwaffe lost many much-needed aircraft for the impending Channel invasion; the Germans were hoping to have deployed the V-1 flying bomb instead of aircraft; RAF intelligence mostly knew of when and where that each individual German raid had been planned; the GL Mk. III radar gun-laying radar would allow aircraft to be easily shot down; only 10% of the German aircraft would find London, with Wiltshire and Gloucestershire being accidentally bombed instead; only from 18 to 24 February 1944 did the raids have any success over London, and in places it was significant; 216 people were killed on 20 February 1944, around Fulham and Putney; on 23 February 1944, a Dornier Do 217 'U5+DK' was hit by radar-guided guns, at 10,000 ft; the pilot Hermann Stemann bailed out over Wembley, and was captured; the aircraft flew on for 60 miles, making an excellent landing in a field north of Cambridge, which gave British radar scientists an undamaged example of the FuG 214 'Lichtenstein' tail warning radar; the Westminster area was deliberately targeted on 24 February 1944; on 14 March 1944, Buckingham Palace was targeted, but nearby Belgravia was hit, killing the girlfriend of Ian Fleming, Muriel Wright.
- Bombing of Manchester; the Manchester area contained many factories, such as Avro
- Bombing of Peterhead; The Forgotten Blitz, on the night of August 10, 1941 Peterhead was bombed; the town and its residents were bombed 28 times, with nearby Aberdeen following closely behind at 24; marking Peterhead as the second most bombed location after London; the Blitz was responsible for 98 civilians and 27 soldiers deaths; the full moon was on August 7, 1941
- Bombing of Plymouth; Plymouth was the home of much of the Royal Navy; there were heavy attacks on Monday 21 April, Tuesday 22 April, where a direct hit on an air-raid shelter killed 76 people and Wednesday 23 April 1941
- Bombing of Portsmouth; on Sunday 27 April 1941 a hotel and hospital were severely damaged
- Bombing of Southampton; Southampton was an important port and contained the Supermarine works, situated next to the sea

== Recent unexploded bomb finds in the United Kingdom ==
- 26 February 2021, at the University of Exeter Halls of Residence, a 1,000 kg parachute mine was detonated. Houses within 100 metres were damaged, and debris landed over 250 metres.

== See also ==
- Air warfare of World War II
- Blitz Street, Channel 4 documentary series that exploded that the same weights of ordnance, showing the effects of blast
- List of German ordnance of World War II (de)
- List of strategic bombing over Germany in World War II
