= Bombings of Heilbronn in World War II =

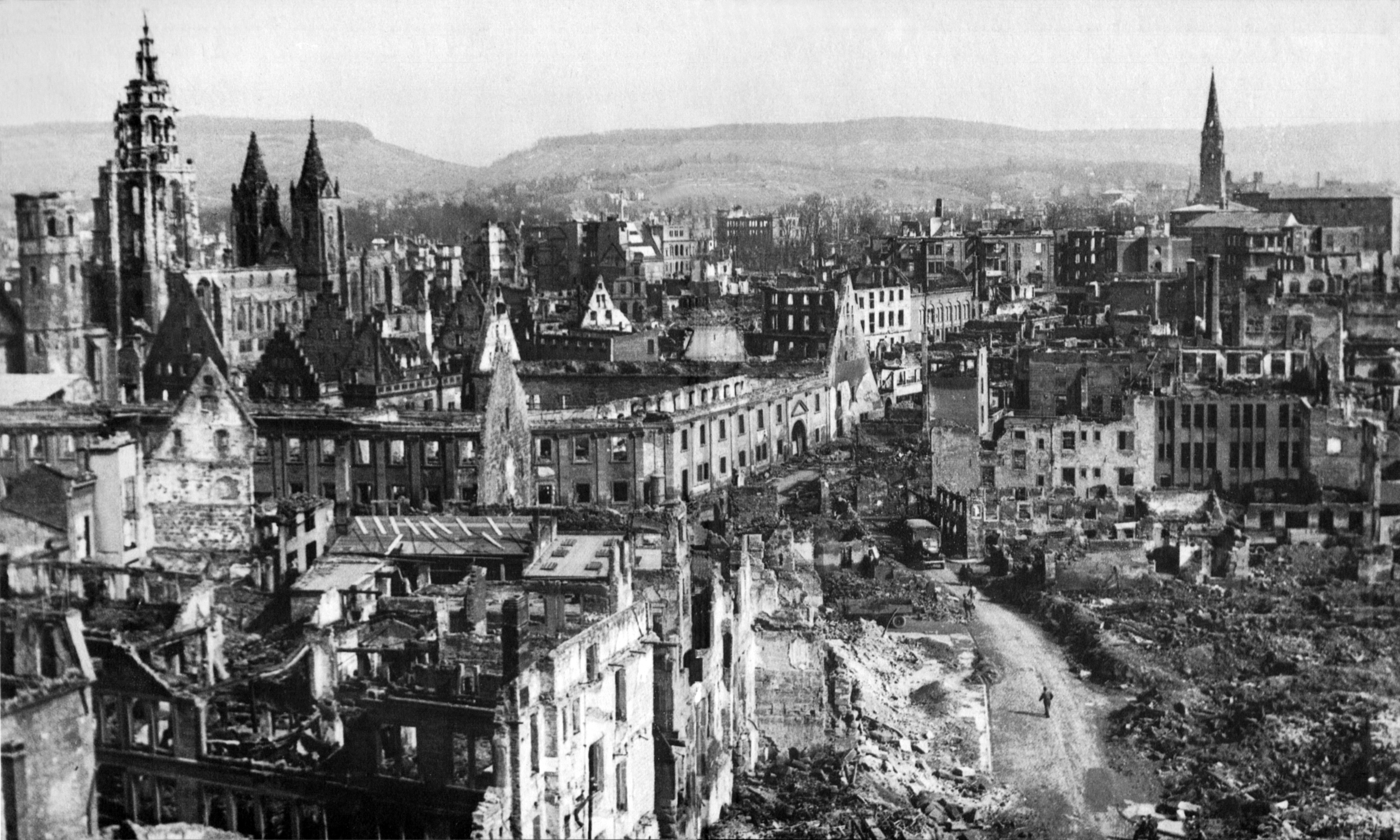
Heilbronn in March,1945

During World War II, the German city of Heilbronn was bombed numerous times by the British Royal Air Force and the United States Army Air Forces. The largest air-raid occurred on December 4, 1944, but Heilbronn was targeted several times before and after until the end of World War II. Altogether, an estimated 7,000 inhabitants of the city lost their lives during bombings.

On 12 April 1945, the U.S. military took control of the city after a ten-day battle, ending bombings of the city. In 2015, Heilbronn had a population of 123,000.

== Initial air raids ==
The first raid occurred on December 17, 1940. Three high-explosive and 20 incendiary bombs were released upon the city, resulting in the destruction of 20 houses and the damaging of 70 more. Three people were killed, and a further twelve were injured. Two days later, heavy anti-air defence was installed in the city, but was soon replaced by a lighter version, due to military requirements.

=== August 1941 - May 1942 ===
Between August and November 1941, the city was bombed four times. However, the resulting damage was minimal. During the day of one of these raids, individual fighter-bombers had been seen flying close-to and around the city. On May 7, 1942, a raid struck the city center, destroying or damaging approximately 150 houses, and killing seven people.

== 1944 ==
In January and February 1944 Heilbronn suffered a two-week-long attack by the Royal Air Force. These raids continued into April, by when the city had been utterly devastated, and air-raid alarms sounded almost daily. Later in the year, the attacks grew so bad that theater in the city was abolished, and the local police decided to enforce a ban on any decorations in windows that could be potentially flammable. On August 5 air-defense devices and weaponry was reinforced. By the beginning of September, the number of air-raid alerts sounded in the city had risen to 160.

=== September ===
By September 1944, Allied forces were seriously considering a major assault on Heilbronn.

At this time, frequent and near-daily alerts were still occurring in the city, but on September 8, four alarms were triggered due to bombers heading for Nuremberg. The alarms happened from 1:45 am to 2:31 am, 11:34 am to 12:42 pm, 2:38 to 3:48 pm and from 10:30 pm to 11:42 pm.

The following day, September 9, only one alarm sounded. However, in the morning of September 10 approximately 100 airplanes of the 8th US Air Force went over Heilbronn. Even though this mission was centred on an aircraft plant in Günzburg, with a secondary target of a marshalling yard in Ulm, there was close cloud cover that day, but Heilbronn was the secondary target. Over Heilbronn, the sky was cloudless, and the actual assault was visible to the populace. Soon after 11:30 that morning, Allied planes struck at Heilbronn's stations and ports and the marshalling yard. Then ensued a bombardment of the city that continued for several hours, causing the death of over 280 people, with an estimated further 400 in need of help due to injury. The raid also caused the loss of over 300 houses. Almost 100 cars were badly damaged or destroyed, many other buildings and stations were rendered irreparable. The planners of this raid called these statistics "very good results" afterwards.

The ensuing fires were too much for the local brigade to handle; help had to be called from places such as Gronau, Lauffen am Neckar, Untereisesheim, Schwaigern and Weinsberg, among others. Even with this aid, the extinguishing of the many fires, both in and around Heilbronn, took several days. The city hall burned for three days.

=== October ===
In the late summer and early autumn of 1944, the Allied forces developed Oboe, a radio-beacon based navigational system. However, targets in southern Germany were about 500 to 600 km away from the transmitters, and because radio signals spread in a linear way and do not follow the Earth's curvature, aircraft had to be led over the target region at a height of approximately 10,000 metres. This required the use of the light and almost completely wooden Mosquito airplanes. With the establishment of Oboe, and in control of a fleet of six Mosquitoes (directed by Oboe), the Allies staged a strike on the city that commenced at 9:30 pm. The railway facilities were targeted by three of these planes, while the city center was assaulted by two aircraft.

On October 28, the railroad was hit again by five Mosquitoes. Two days later, six aircraft attacked the railroad and the city center. After this, several more attacks caused intense fire. During these raids, at least half a dozen attacks had hit the city, all in October. Despite this, the city remained a target.

== December raid ==
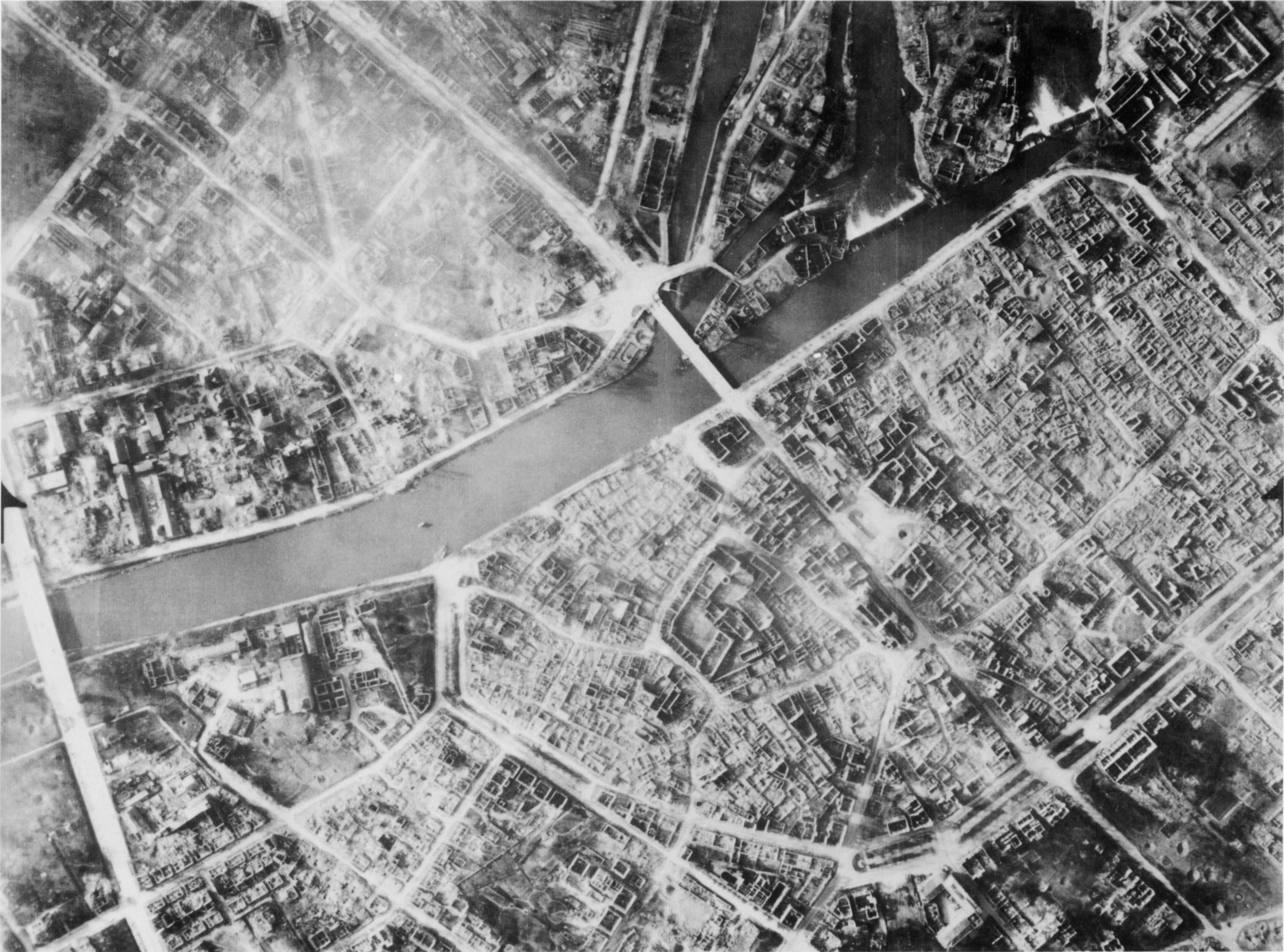
The old part of the city after the December 1944 attacks

On the evening of December 4, 1944, 282 Lancaster bombers of 5 Group and ten Mosquito Pathfinder aircraft flew over the city in loose formation. The night was thickly clouded, this factor altered the approach height of the planes. At 7:18 the first plane flew over, but it was the second plane that dropped 10 bombs with long-term fuses onto the city about one minute later. Immediately after dropping the bombs, this plane began its return flight. At 7:20, flare markers were dropped on the city in order to allow accurate bombing by the rest of the squadron. A 'flashlight bomb' was dropped, and exploded at 200 metres. After all the flares were released, the area was illuminated as bright as day. This light was clearly distinguishable to the bomber pilots, and they were subsequently ordered to go in and assault.

After the flare markers, the flashlight bombs, and other such devices used for targeting were released and were functioning effectively, Lancaster PB 251s dropped the first load of high explosives. Approximately 5,800 bombs, dropped from a height of 3,800 metres, hitting the city at 7:29. The attack continued until 9:38, with a further 1,200 tonnes of bombs released upon the city, and 380 devastating the marshalling yard.

Within a period of half an hour, over 6,500 people, including 1,000 children under 10 years of age, lost their lives. The exact number of victims is impossible to determine because many corpses were burned beyond recognition. Due to the number of incendiary bombs that fell on the city, and the number and impact of the bombs, fires burned throughout the night, entering the city was impossible for days.

=== Aftermath ===
Although 62% of the city was destroyed, the damage in relation to the number of bombs and the force of the attack is remarkable for several reasons. Many German cities and towns were already in ruins, or were burnt-out by prior bombardments; the British would have preferred to attack with high explosive bombs in order to maximise the damage caused. The entire old section of the town was destroyed. Donations to the city were instrumental to the city's repairs and victim aid.

During the actual attack, German defenses could do little. Two anti-aircraft positions at the Neckar and 14 German Junkers Ju 88 night fighters fought against the British bombers. The RAF lost eleven aircraft.

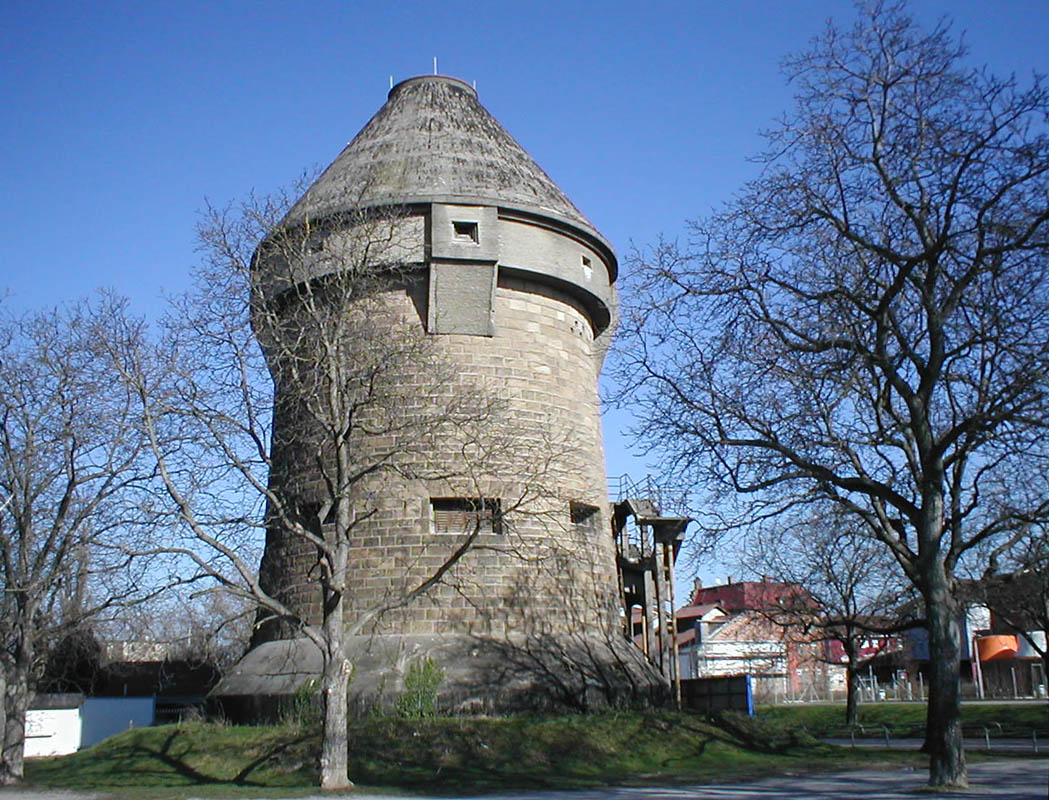
The General Wever tower, where many people sought shelter from the December 4 bombardment

Since the bombing was conducted on a Monday evening, much of the population of Heilbronn was positioned in or around the city center, but at the first signs of attack, many fled to a high bomb shelter (the General Wever tower), and two other low shelters (in the industrial area and at Kaiser Friedrich-Platz). Many also fled to an air raid shelter nearby. However, by 8:00 pm the city centre was engulfed in flames, and anyone inside these buildings either burned to death or were asphyxiated. Many people who attempted to leave the city were also burnt on the roads. In the end, the air raid shelter collapsed, anyone left inside was killed.

To make matters worse, the urban hospital was left in ruins, so it was nearly impossible to treat the wounded. A great many people were able to take refuge in the emergency military hospital, or a converted mental hospital located in nearby Weinsberg.

After the fires were under control, rescue work and clearing up of the town began and help was sought from the surrounding area. On the night of 5 December the number of dead was stated to be approximately 4,000 with another 3,000 injured.

=== Burials ===
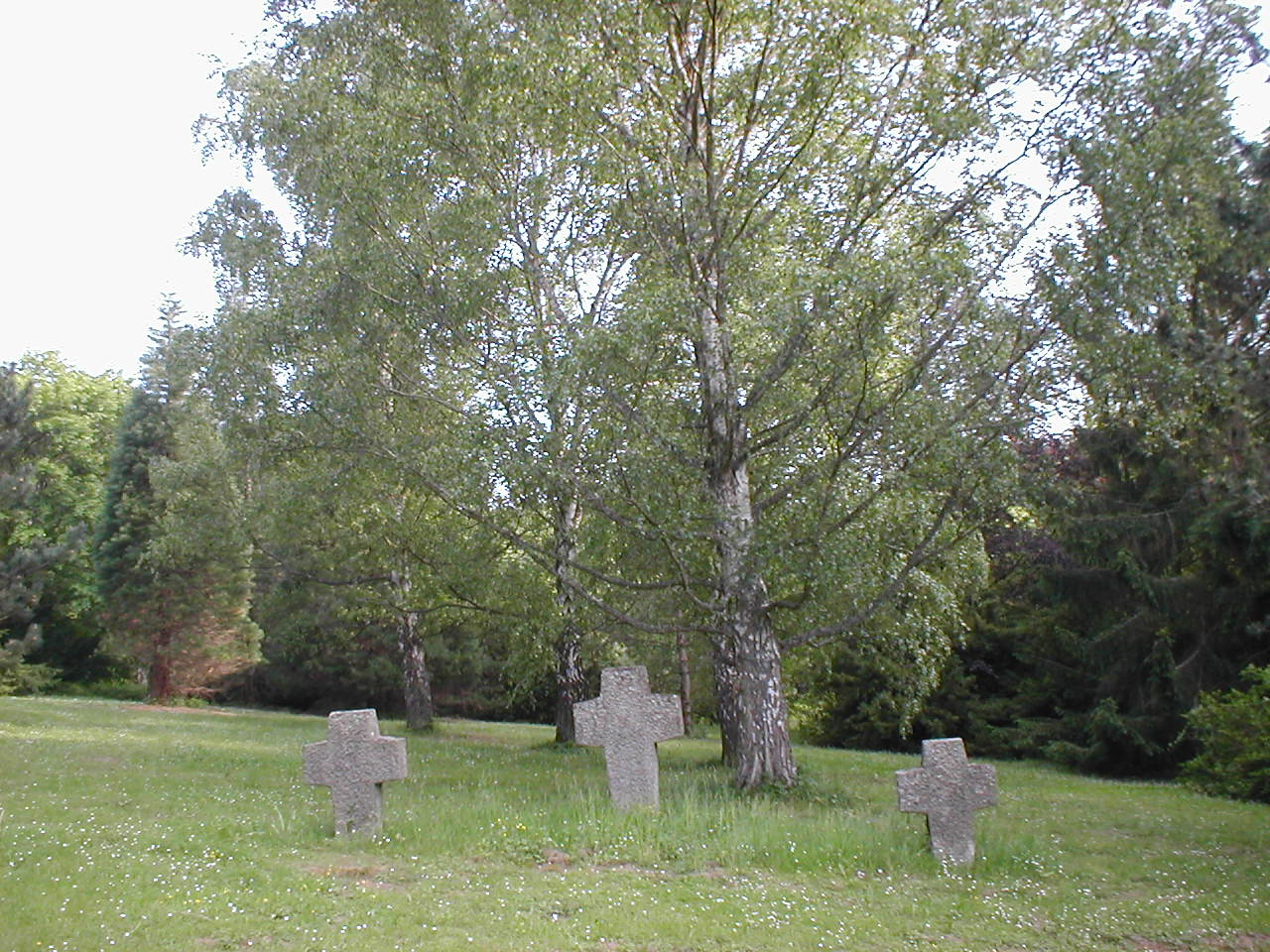
Graves at the honor cemetery for those who died in the bombing

A task force was chosen to find the dead and to rescue any bodies. The dead that were found were brought to the city cemetery. Even then, there were not enough coffins for all the dead, Ulm and other cities supplied a total of 1,000 caskets. When it was found that the cemetery, as well as other places, could not provide enough space to adequately lay to rest the deceased, the resolution was that an honor cemetery (mass grave) be built at the edge of the forest near the valley of the Köpfer Creek. The work on this project began on 6 December, while the dead were brought on carriages to the Köpfer Valley.
On 8 December, the burnt-out city center and the collapsed air raid shelter were accessed by salvage teams, and more dead were returned to the families for burial. Salvage work continued for over three weeks, into the Christmas of 1944. Many dead could not be retrieved, particularly in heavily damaged road courses. Many would simply have been impossible to locate or bring out, whether from the air-raid shelter, or the ruins of the city center; it is assumed that there are many human remains still in the soil.

== Attacks until the end of the war ==
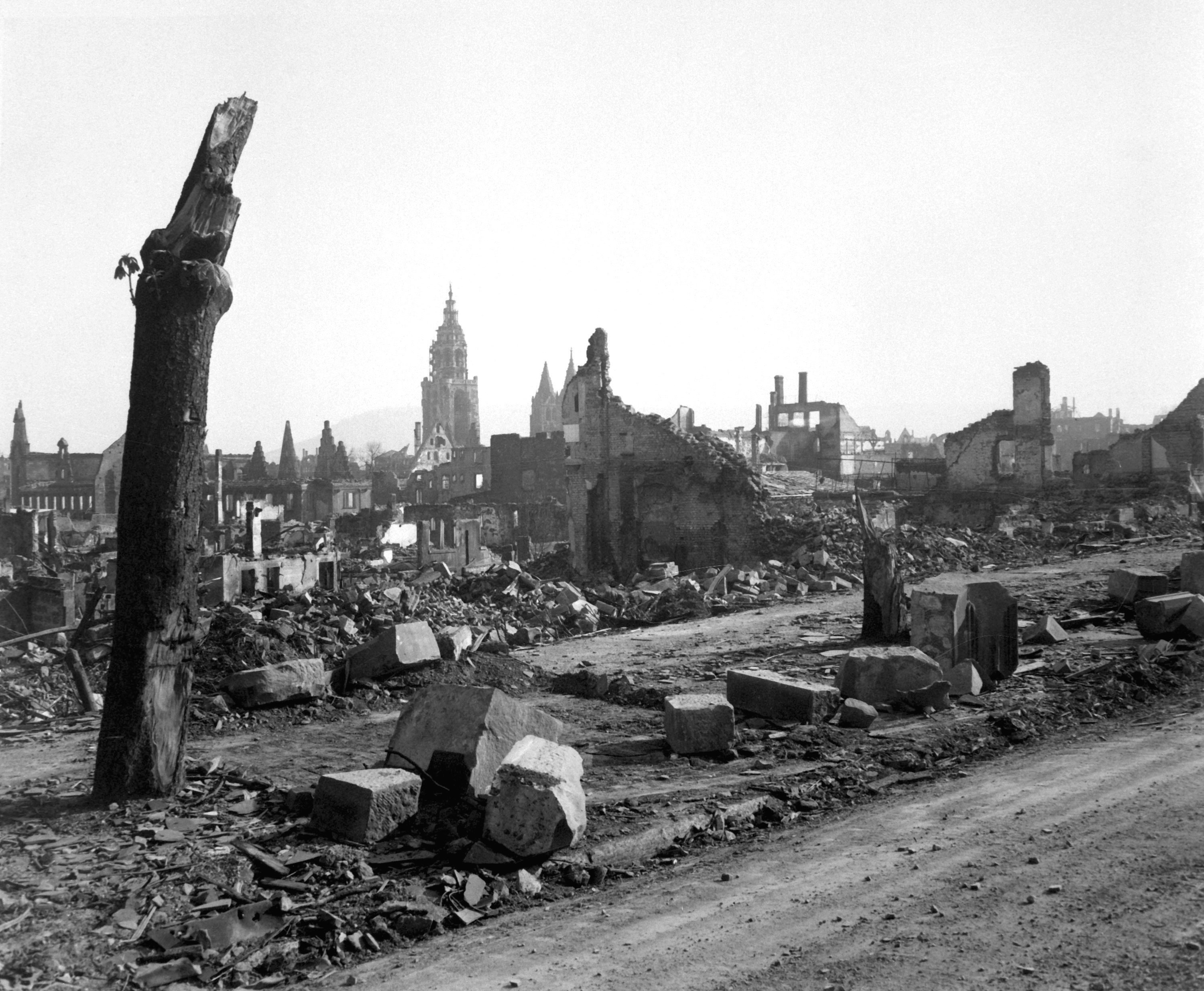
Heilbronn in April, 1945

Up to the end of the war, several raids, while much less powerful or as damaging as the attack in December 1944, were centered on Heilbronn. These attacks were relatively minor and were more focused on other parts of southern Germany, with Heilbronn receiving much less attention than before.

On 12 April 1945, US forces occupied the city, after a ten-day battle over the Neckar crossings.

At the war's start, Heilbronn had almost 14,500 buildings. During the war 5,100 buildings were destroyed and another 3,800 badly damaged. Heilbronn's population shrank to 46,350.

== Reconstruction and recovery ==
After the war had ended, Emil Beutinger, a former pre-Nazi era mayor, re-entered office and took responsibility for the enormous task of reconstruction and repair of the city. This task was continued and completed by his successors in office, Paul Metz and Paul Meyle. Reconstruction milestones included the rededication of the historic city hall in 1953 and the reopening of the community centre.

Starting in 1951, US forces were permanently stationed in the city. The Americans added several of their own buildings. They also used barracks built before World War II.

== Present day Heilbronn ==
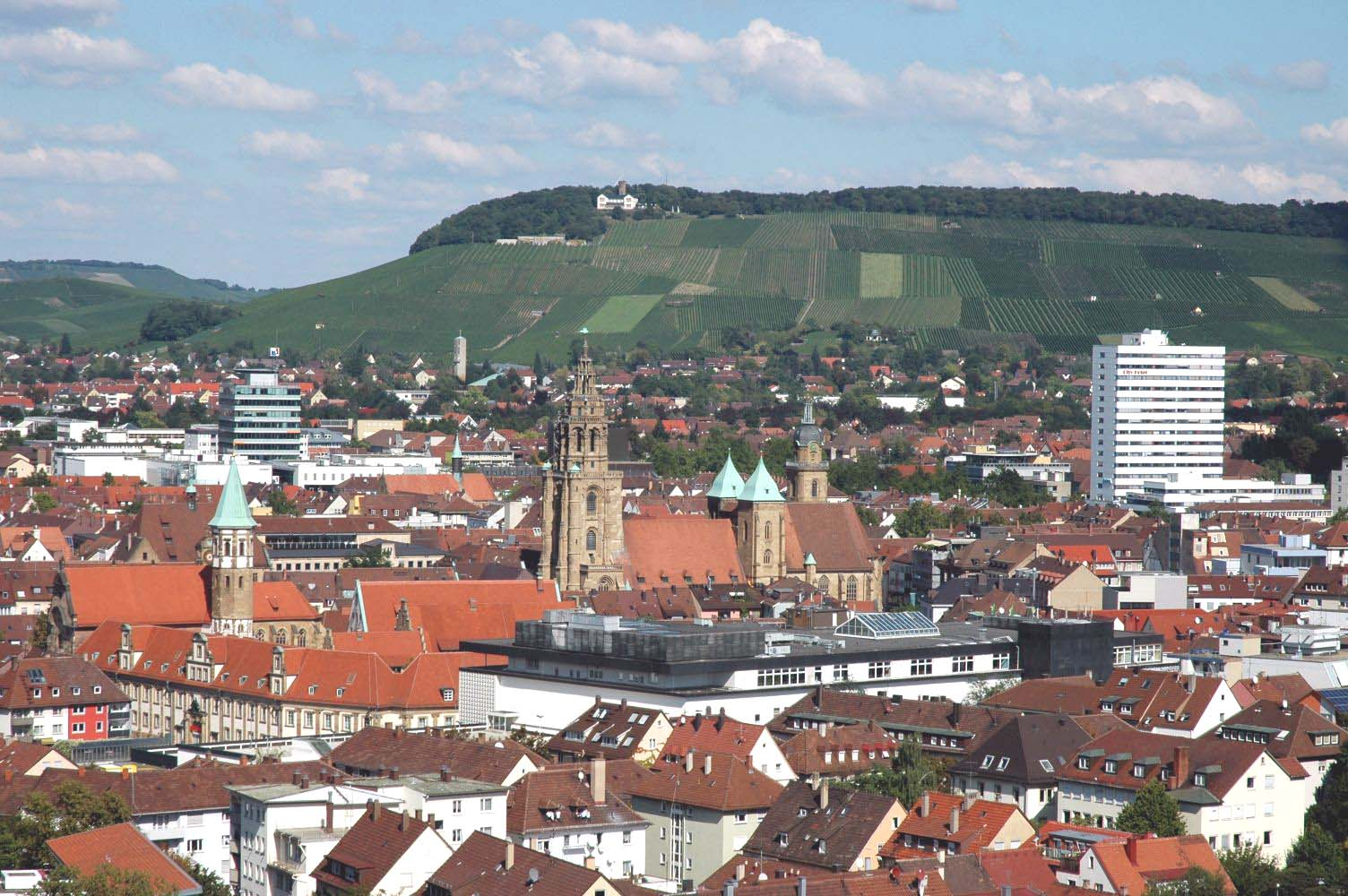
Heilbronn city center in 2005

Today, Heilbronn thrives, but while the city itself has all but recovered, the memory of the attacks and all who died as a result lives on. It now has approximately 120,000 residents, and is currently the sixth largest city in Baden-Württemberg, at almost 100 square kilometers in area. Heilbronn is also known as the "major economic centre" of the Heilbronn-Franken region, an area that encompasses almost all of the Northeast section of Baden-Württemberg.

== Memorials ==
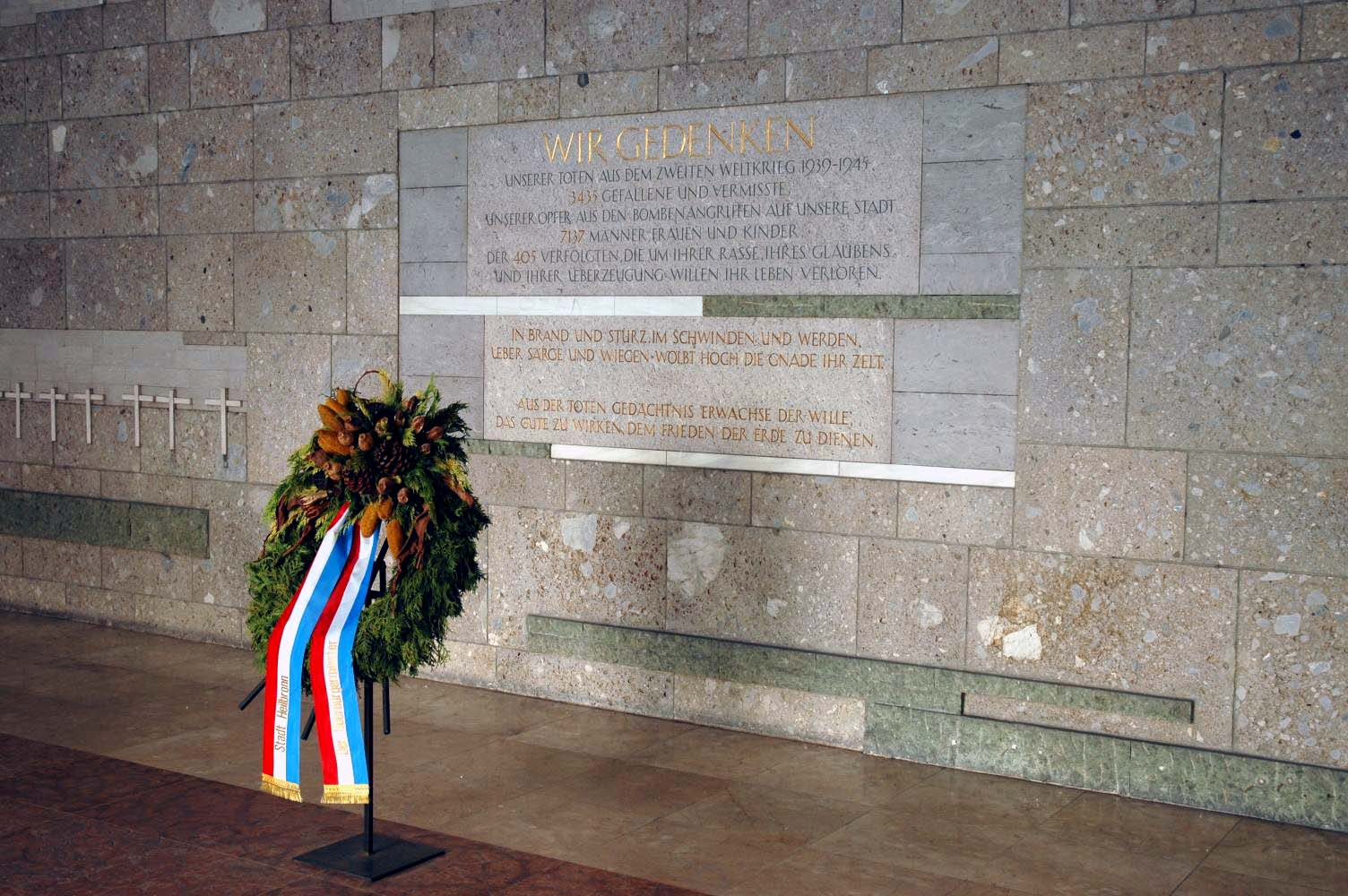
The memorial in city hall

The first memorial commemoration of those who died took place on 26 August 1945. Since then, an annual memorial service has been held, and on December 4, many people come to the honor cemetery to reflect on the dead. The destruction and subsequent reconstruction has reshaped the landscape, its effects are still visible today. The unsalvageable rubble from the attacks has been dumped into the Neckar River and Böckinger Lake.

== See also ==
- Terror bombing
- List of strategic bombing over Germany in World War II
