= Bombing of Cologne in World War II =

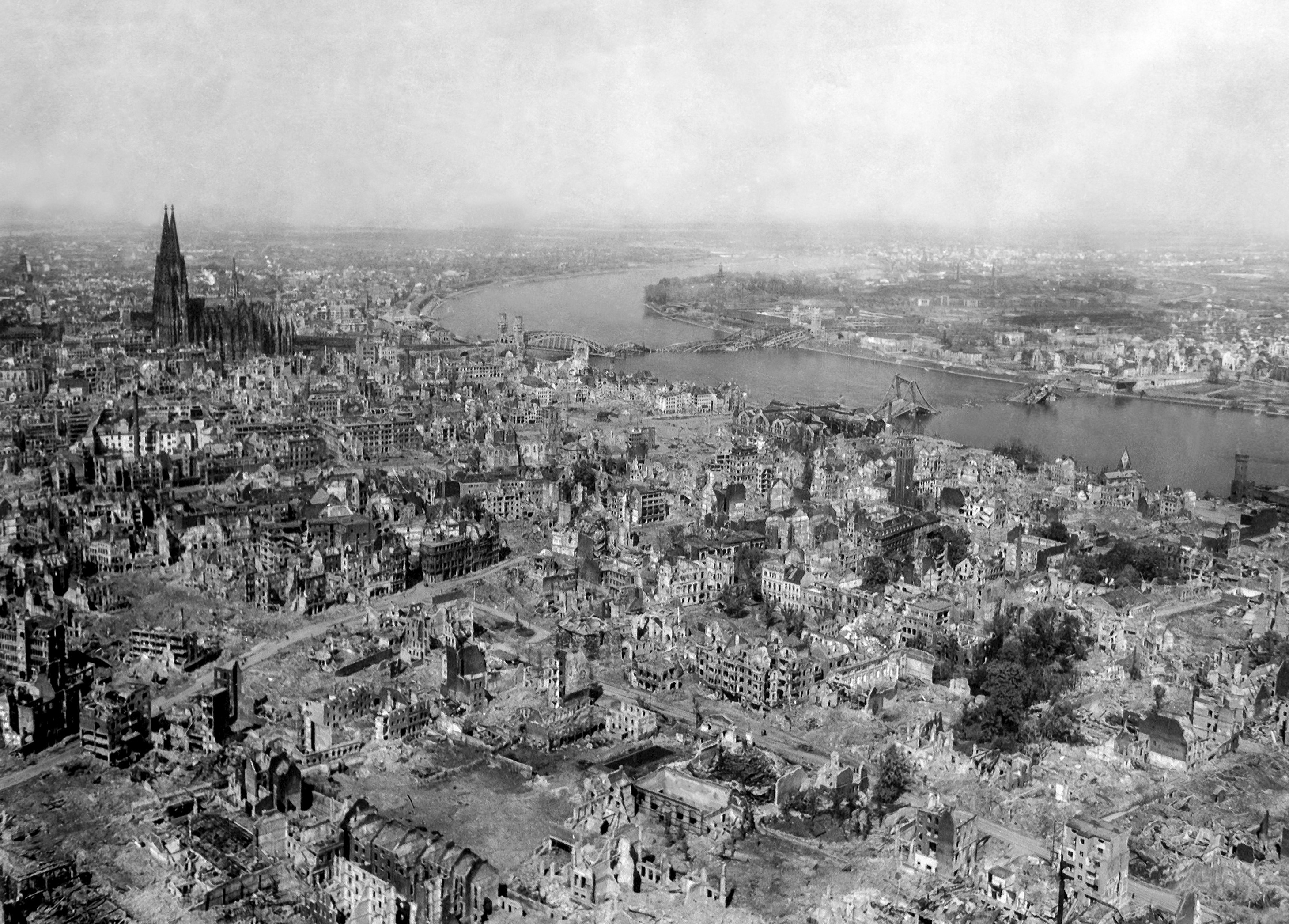
A ruined Cologne in 1945

The German city of Cologne was bombed in 262 separate air raids by the Allies during World War II, all by the Royal Air Force (RAF). A total of 34,711 long tons (35,268 t) of bombs were dropped on the city causing 20,000 civilian casualties.

While air raid alarms had gone off in the winter and spring of 1940 as British bombers passed overhead, the first bombing took place on 12 May 1940. The attack on Cologne during the night from 30 to 31 May 1942 was the first thousand-bomber raid.

== First thousand-bomber raid ==
Innenstadt, Cologne in 1945

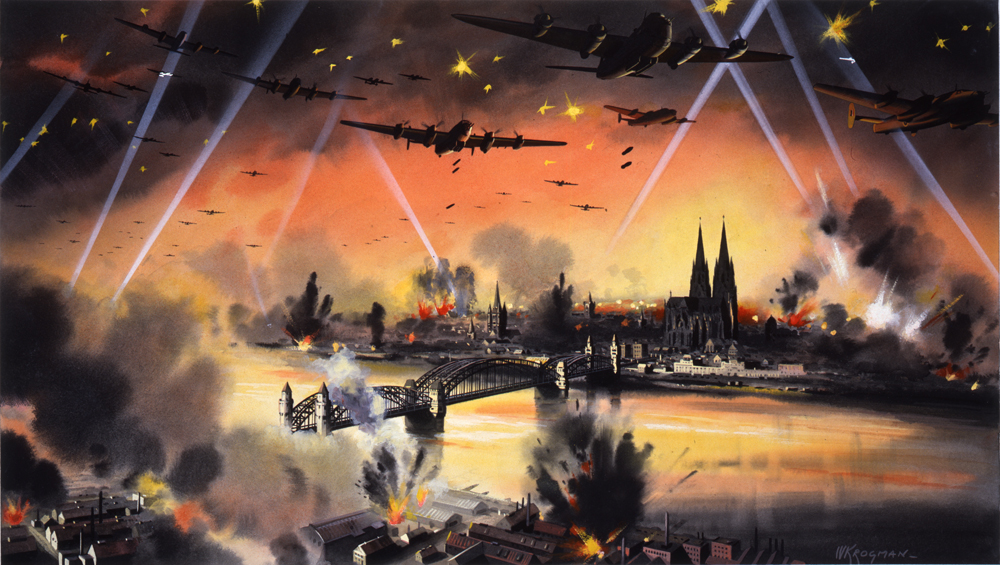
Official British war art imagining a bombing raid on Cologne. The city's cathedral is clearly visible. It survived the war, despite being hit dozens of times by Allied bombs.

The first thousand raid by the RAF was conducted on Cologne during the night of 30–31 May 1942. Codenamed Operation Millennium, the raid was launched because it was expected that the devastation from such raids might be enough to knock Germany out of the war or at least severely damage German morale. The raids were useful propaganda for the Allies and particularly for Arthur Harris, the new leader of RAF Bomber Command and his concept of a Strategic Bombing Offensive. Bomber Command's poor bombing accuracy during 1941 had led to calls for the force to be split up and diverted to other urgent theatres, such as the Battle of the Atlantic. A headline-grabbing heavy raid on Germany was a way for Harris to demonstrate to the War Cabinet that given the investment in numbers and technology Bomber Command could make a vital contribution to victory.

At this stage of the war Bomber Command only had a regular front line strength of around 400 aircraft, and were in the process of changing from the twin engined medium bombers of the pre-war years to the newer more effective four-engined heavy bombers, the Short Stirling, Handley Page Halifax and Avro Lancaster. By using bombers and men from Operational Training Units (OTUs), 250 from RAF Coastal Command and from Flying Training Command, Harris could easily make up the 1,000 aircraft. Just before the raid took place, the Royal Navy refused to allow the Coastal Command aircraft to take part in the raid. The Admiralty perceived the propaganda justifications too weak an argument against the U-boat peril in the Battle of the Atlantic. Harris scrambled around and, by crewing 49 more aircraft with pupil pilots and instructors, 1,047 bombers eventually took part in the raid, two and a half times more than any previous raid by the RAF; 58 bombers were from Polish units. In addition to the bombers attacking Cologne, 113 other aircraft on "intruder" raids harassed German night-fighter airfields.

Cologne was not Harris's first choice; he wanted to bomb Hamburg but bad weather made Hamburg a poor choice and Harris was advised by Basil Dickins, a scientist who was section head of the Bomber Command Operational Research Section (ORS-BC) to choose Cologne, which wasin range of the GEE navigation system.

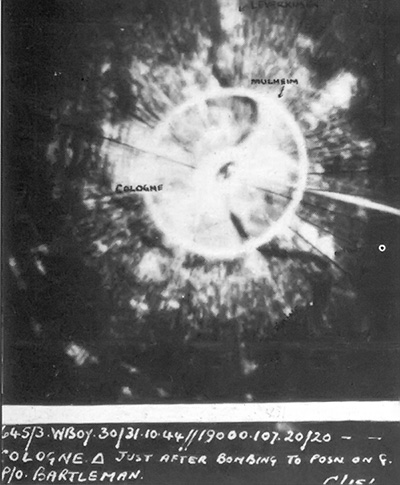
RAF bomber H2S radar display from the 30/31 October 1944 Cologne attack with post-attack annotations

This was the first time that the "bomber stream" tactic was used and most of the tactics used in this raid remained the basis for standard Bomber Command operations for the next two years, with some elements remaining in use until the end of the war. It was expected that such a large number of bombers flying in a bomber stream through the Kammhuber Line would overwhelm the German night fighters' ground-controlled interception system, keeping the number of bombers shot down to an acceptable proportion. The recent introduction of GEE allowed the bombers to fly a given route at a given time and height. The British night bombing campaign had been in operation for several years and a statistical estimate could be made of the number of bombers likely to be lost to enemy night fighters and anti-aircraft guns (flak), and how many would be lost through collisions. Minimising the former demanded a densely packed stream, as the controllers of a night fighter flying a defensive 'box' could only direct a maximum of six potential interceptions per hour, and the flak gunners could not concentrate on all the available targets at once. Earlier in the war, four hours had been considered acceptable for a mission; for this raid all the bombers passed over Cologne and bombed it in a window of 90 minutes, with the first having arrived at 0:47 am on 31 May. It was anticipated that the concentration of bombing over such a short period would overwhelm the Cologne fire brigade and cause conflagrations similar to those inflicted on London by the Luftwaffe during the Blitz.

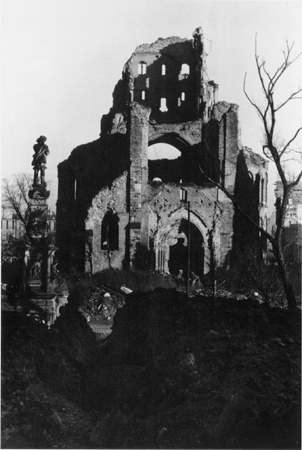
Ruins of Great St. Martin Church at Cologne old market photographed by Hermann Claasen (c. 1946–47); it has since been rebuilt

In the raid, 868 aircraft bombed the main target with 15 aircraft bombing other targets. The total tonnage of bombs dropped was 1,478 tonnes (3.3 million pounds) with two-thirds of that being incendiaries. Two and a half thousand separate fires were started with 1,700 classed by the German fire brigades as "large". The action of fire fighters and the width of the streets stopped the fires combining into a firestorm, but nonetheless most of the damage was done by fire and not directly by the explosive blasts. 3,330 non-residential buildings were destroyed, 2,090 seriously damaged and 7,420 lightly damaged, making a total of 12,840 buildings of which 2,560 were industrial or commercial buildings. Among the buildings classed as totally destroyed were: 7 official administration buildings, 14 public buildings, 7 banks, 9 hospitals, 17 churches, 16 schools, 4 university buildings, 10 postal and railway buildings, 10 buildings of historic interest, 2 newspaper offices, 4 hotels, 2 cinemas and 6 department stores. The only military installation damaged was the flak barracks. The damage to civilian homes, most of them apartments in larger buildings, was considerable: 13,010 destroyed, 6,360 seriously damaged, 22,270 lightly damaged. The devastation was recorded by Hermann Claasen from 1942 until the end of the war, and presented in his exhibition and book of 1947 Singing in the furnace. Cologne – Remains of an old city.

The RAF lost 43 aircraft (German sources claimed 44), 3.9% of the 1,103 bombers sent on the raid; 22 aircraft were lost over or near Cologne, 16 shot down by flak, four by night fighters, two in a collision, and two Bristol Blenheim light bombers lost in attacks on night fighter airfields. A posthumous Victoria Cross was awarded to Flying Officer Leslie Manser who sacrificed himself so his crew could abandon the Avro Manchester aircraft.

Sources of aircraft
Group	Aircraft	No.
No. 1 Group RAF	156 Wellington medium bombers	156
No. 3 Group RAF	134 Wellington; 88 Stirling heavy bombers	222
No. 4 Group RAF	131 Halifax heavy bombers 9 Wellington; 7 Whitley medium bombers	147
No. 5 Group RAF	73 Lancaster heavy bombers 46 Manchester medium (Note: Although produced to a specification for a "medium bomber", the Manchester used two powerful engines and was closer to a heavy bomber. The design was developed with four engines to replace the two and became the Lancaster.) bombers 34 Handley Page Hampden medium bombers	153
No. 91 (Operational Training) Group	236 Wellington; 21 Whitley	257
No. 92 (Operational Training) Group	63 Wellington; 45 Hampden	108
Flying Training Command	4 Wellington	4

== Timeline ==
Timeline
Date (Note: Dates such as 5/6 April denote a night raid, the mission starting on the first date and ending on the following date.)	Bomber force	Notes
17/18 May 1940	RAF	Six Wellingtons bomb the railway yards.
13/14 February 1942	RAF	39 aircraft encountered ice and cloud, poor bombing results reported.
13/14 March 1942	RAF	135 aircraft involved in the raid. The raid killed 62 and injured a further 84. 237 separate fires were started and the RAF estimated the raid to be five times more effective than average of recent raids on Cologne. This is considered to be the first successful GEE raid. The RAF lost one Avro Manchester.
5/6 April 1942	RAF	263 aircraft. 179 Wellingtons, 44 Hampdens, 29 Stirlings, and 11 Manchesters against Humboldt works. 4 Wellingtons and 1 Hampden lost. Bombing photographs showed five miles from target.
22/23 April 1942	RAF	69 aircraft (64 Wellingtons and 5 Stirlings) on experimental raid. All aircraft were using Gee as blind-bombing aid. Two Wellingtons lost.
27/28 April 1942	RAF	97 aircraft (76 Wellingtons, 19 Stirlings, 2 Halifaxes). 6 Wellingtons and 1 Halifax lost. "Considerable number of bombs" landed outside city to east. "150 hectares of the Tannenwald destroyed by fire"
30/31 May 1942	RAF	868 aircraft bombed Cologne during the first 1000 bomber raid (1,047 aircraft), laden with over 3,000 tonnes of ordnance.
31 May 1942	RAF	Photo reconnaissance by 5 de Havilland Mosquitoes of No. 105 Squadron RAF.
31 May/1 June 1942	RAF	Two aircraft. Conditions were cloudy over Cologne so no bombing was undertaken. Both aircraft returned to base.
1 June 1942	RAF	2 Mosquitoes in a nuisance and diversionary raid. (Note: Nuisance raids forced the population into air raid shelters and activated other defence measures at little cost to the RAF.) (Note: Sending bombers to different places was intended to confuse the German defences and so helped to make it more difficult for the defenders to direct fighters onto the main attack.)
26 July 1942	RAF	3 Mosquitoes in a nuisance raid.
10 August 1942	RAF	Single Mosquito on a nuisance raid, bombs and returns to base.
25 August 1942	RAF	4 Mosquitoes to Germany on nuisance raids, one of them to Cologne, three complete their mission and bomb, one lost.
2 September 1942	RAF	1 Mosquito on a nuisance raid, bombs and returns to base.
2 September 1942	RAF	2 Mosquitoes on a nuisance raid, bomb through cloud and return to base.
7 September 1942	RAF	1 Mosquito on a nuisance raid, bomb through cloud and return to base, no record of the bombing on the ground.
15/16 October 1942	RAF	289 aircraft.
22/23 January 1943	RAF	This was the first raid on Cologne using Oboe blind bombing radio navigation, two Mosquitoes damaged 55 houses, killing 5 people and 22 injured. This showed that, using electronic aids, a few bombers were able to inflict as much damage as 100-bomber raids in poor weather in the previous years.
2/3 February 1943	RAF	161 aircraft.
14/15 February 1943	RAF	243 aircraft.
25/26 February 1943	RAF	6 Mosquitoes to the Ruhr in a diversionary raid (the main attack was against Nuremberg), 13 people were killed in Cologne
26/27 February 1943	RAF	427 aircraft.
May 1943	RAF	
11/12 June 1943	RAF	One Mosquito as part of a diversionary raid (the main attack was against Düsseldorf)
13/14 June 1943	RAF	2 Mosquitoes bombed Cologne one of several nuisance raid.
16/17 June 1943	RAF	212 aircraft.
17/18 June 1943	RAF	Two Mosquitoes bombed Cologne, one of several nuisance raids.
19/20 June 1943	RAF	Six Mosquitoes to Cologne, Duisburg and Düsseldorf (the main attack was against Le Creusot).
22/23 June 1943	RAF	Four Mosquitoes as a diversionary raid, (the main attack was against Mülheim).
23/24 June 1943	RAF	Three Mosquitoes on a nuisance raid.
28/29 June 1943	RAF	608 aircraft.
2/3 July 1943	RAF	Three Mosquitoes on a nuisance raid.
3/4 July 1943	RAF	653 aircraft attacked Cologne's industrial area on the east bank of the Rhine. A new German unit, Jagdgeschwader 300, used the Wilde Sau tactic with single-engined fighters for the first time. The German fighters, taking advantage of the illumination from searchlights, target indicator flares and fires claimed that they shot down 12 aircraft, but had to share their claims with the Anti-aircraft artillery who also claimed the bombers. To avoid friendly fire, anti-aircraft batteries restricted the height of their flak and the fighters operated above that ceiling.
5/6 July 1943	RAF	4 Mosquitoes on a nuisance raid.
6/7 July 1943	RAF	4 Mosquitoes on a nuisance raid.
7/8 July 1943	RAF	4 Mosquitoes on a nuisance raid.
8/9 July 1943	RAF	288 aircraft.
13/14 July 1943	RAF	Two Mosquitoes on a diversionary raid drop target indicators (the main raid was on Aachen).
25/26 July 1943	RAF	3 Mosquitoes on a diversionary raid (the main raid was on Essen).
4/5 August 1943	RAF	5 Mosquitoes Cologne and Duisburg through cloud.
4/5 August 1943	RAF	5 Mosquitoes Cologne and Duisburg through cloud, the only sorties of the night. No losses
6/7 August 1943	RAF	8 Mosquitoes to Cologne and Duisburg, the only sorties over Germany that night. All 8 returned to base
7/8 August 1943	RAF	4 Mosquitoes in a nuisance raid.
11/12 August 1943	RAF	8 Mosquitoes in a nuisance raid.
29/20 August 1943	RAF	Four Mosquitoes equipped with Oboe, with another four to Duisburg, in a nuisance raids. One Mosquito lost.
1 September 1943	RAF	8 Mosquitoes were sent to Cologne and Duisburg. No Mosquitoes lost.
4/5 September 1943	RAF	8 Mosquitoes were sent to Cologne and Duisburg. No Mosquitoes were lost.
13/14 September 1943	RAF	5 Mosquitoes equipped with Oboe with another 5 to Duisburg, in a nuisance raids. No Mosquitoes were lost.
18/19 September 1943	RAF	5 Mosquitoes on a nuisance raid. No Mosquitoes were lost.
24/25 September 1943	RAF	8 Mosquitoes to Cologne and Düsseldorf on nuisance raids. No Mosquitoes were lost.
26/27 September 1943	RAF	4 Mosquitoes to Cologne on a nuisance raid. No Mosquitoes were lost.
26/27 September 1943	RAF	8 Mosquitoes attacked Cologne and Gelsenkirchen on nuisance raids. These were the only Bomber Command sorties of the night. No Mosquitoes were lost.
2/3 October 1943	RAF	8 Mosquitoes to Cologne and Gelsenkirchen on diversionary raids. The main raid was to Munich. No aircraft lost on the diversionary raids.
3/4 October 1943	RAF	12 Oboe Mosquitoes bombed the Knapsack power-station near Cologne. No aircraft lost.
13/14 October 1943	RAF	4 Mosquitoes to Cologne on a nuisance raid. No Mosquitoes were lost.
20/21 October 1943	RAF	28 Mosquitoes to Berlin, Cologne, Brauweiler and Emden, 2 Mosquitoes lost. The main raid of the night was to Leipzig.
22 December 1943	USAAF	VIII Bomber Command Mission 163: 1 B-17 dropped two 2,000-pound (907 kF) general-purpose bombs and 1 photo-flash at 2020 hours; no casualties.
1/2 January 1944	RAF	1 Mosquito on a diversionary nuisance raid and returned safely to base (main raid to Berlin)
4/5 January 1944	RAF	2 Mosquitoes on a nuisance raid, both returned to base.
2/3 February 1944	RAF	3 Mosquitoes on a nuisance raid, all returned to base.
16/17 March 1944	RAF	8 Mosquitoes on a diversionary nuisance raid, all returned to base (main raid Amiens)
17/18 March 1944	RAF	28 Mosquitoes bombed Cologne, all returned to base.
21/22 March 1944	RAF	27 Mosquitoes bombed Cologne, all returned to base.
29/30 March 1944	RAF	4 Mosquitoes on a diversionary nuisance raid, all returned to base (main raids Vaires, near Paris, and Lyons).
29/30 March 1944	RAF	34 Mosquitoes on diversions to Aachen, Cologne and Kassel, all returned to base, (but the main raid to Nuremberg resulted in the biggest Bomber Command loss of the war).
April 1944	USAAF	303rd Bomb Group Failed deployment of GB-1 Glide Bomb (Note: "[The GB-1 Glide Bomb] was made from a M34-2000lb bomb fixed to a 12-foot span glider unit and attached to a B-17 underwing shackle." Two could be carried per plane. "Essentially free fall, the bomb had a stabilizing device that allowed control of direction. The bomb proved to be unreliable on the only occasion it was used on Cologne in April 1944.")
18/19 July 1944	RAF	6 Mosquitoes on a diversionary raid, part of a night when the RAF made four substantial attacks and a number of small raids like that on Cologne. They attacked the synthetic oil plants at Wesseling and Scholven/Buer, railway junctions at Aulnoye and Revigny and a flying-bomb launching site at Acque.
14 October 1944	VIII Bomber Command	Mission 677: As part of Operation Hurricane (1944) a round-the-clock bombing operation, PFF attacks were made on Cologne marshaling yards at Gereon, Gremberg, and Eifeltor; as well as Euskirchen 22 mi (35 km) outside Cologne.
1944-10-15		The 486 BG bombed Cologne.
17 October 1944	8th AF (Note: The VIII Bomber Command had been redesignated as the US Eighth Air Force.)	Mission 681: 1,338 bombers and 811 fighters are dispatched on PFF attacks in the Cologne, Germany area; 465 B-17s are dispatched to hit marshalling yards at Cologne/Eifeltor (216) and Cologne/Gremberg (34); the targets of opportunity were Cologne/Kalk marshalling yard (151), 453 B-17s are dispatched to hit marshalling yards at Cologne/Gereon (295) and Cologne/Kalk (142)
12/13 February 1945	RAF	3 Mosquitoes on H2S radar trials. No aircraft lost.
2 March 1945	RAF	In the last RAF raid on Cologne, 858 aircraft bomb in two waves. Only 15 of the 155 aircraft in the second wave dropped their bombs. A daylight raid in good weather, the bombing was "highly destructive".
2 March 1945	USAAF	A single B-17 bombed Cologne as a target of opportunity.
5 March 1945		9th Tactical US Army Air Force fighters dropped leaflets in the Cologne-Bonn area.
6 March 1945		American troops captured Cologne.

== See also ==
- The Blitz – German air raids on British cities in which at least 40,000 died, including 57 consecutive nights of air raids just over London
- Baedeker Blitz – Air raids on English cities of cultural/historical importance, rather than military significance
- German bombing of Rotterdam
- Bombing of Dresden in World War II
- Bombing of Guernica – German/Italian air raid that sparked international outrage
- Bombing of Tokyo (10 March 1945), the codenamed-Operation Meetinghouse firebombing raid on Tokyo on 9/10 March 1945

== Bibliography ==
- Sebald, W. G. (2003) [1999], On the Natural History of Destruction
- Bishop, Chris (2005), The Military Atlas of World War II, Amber Books, p. 30, ISBN 1-904687-43-1
- Bomber Command Campaign Diary, Bomber Command 60th Anniversary, Royal Air Force, 6 April 2005, Wikidata Q131324214, archived from the original on 6 July 2007
