= Bombing of Duisburg in World War II =

World War II military action

Bombing of Duisburg during World War II
- Part of Strategic bombing during World War II
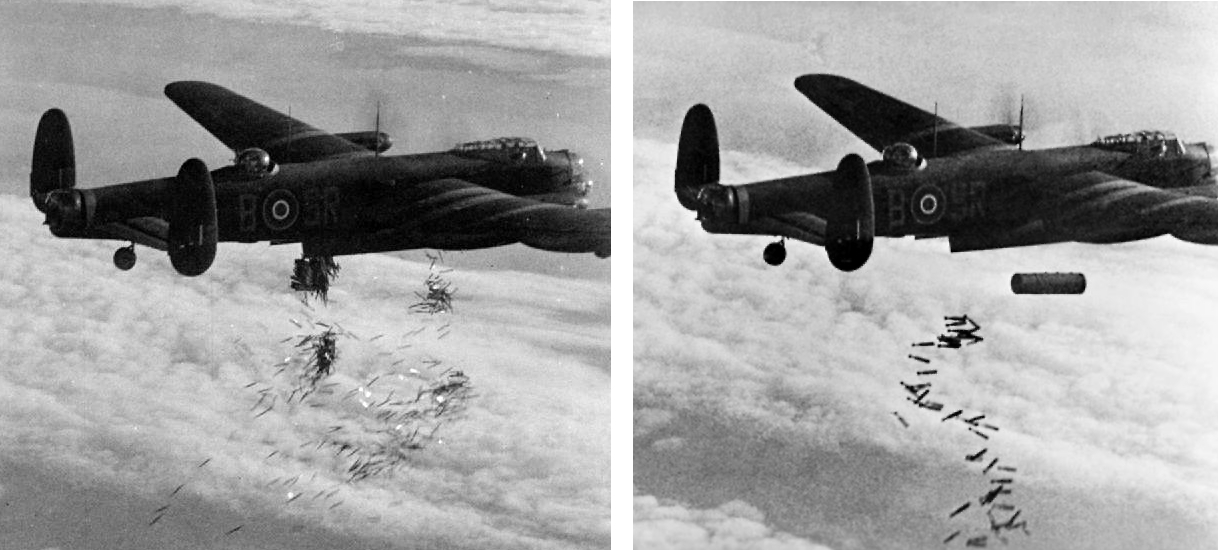
- "Window" (left) and 14-kilogram (30 lb) incendiaries and a blockbuster bomb (right) dropped from an ABC- radio jammer equipped Avro Lancaster over Duisburg in 1944
Location	Duisburg
Result	Near complete destruction of the historic cityscape

Belligerents
United Kingdom; United States	Germany

Strength
229 bombing raids	

Duisburg was bombed a number of times by the Allies during World War II. The most devastating air raids on Duisburg occurred during October 1944 when the city was bombed by the Royal Air Force (RAF).

Duisburg was a major logistical centre in the Ruhr Area and location of chemical, steel and iron industries, Duisburg was a primary target of Allied bombers. Not only the industrial areas but also residential areas were attacked by Allied bombs. As an entry to the Ruhr, the city received daily warnings of bombing raids in 1943.

In the period 1939 to 1945 the Royal Air Force dropped a total of 30,507 tonnes (67 million pounds) of bombs on Duisburg.

== Battle of the Ruhr ==
During the "Battle of the Ruhr" in 1943, 577 British bombers destroyed the old city on 12/13 May, with 1,574 long tons; 1,763 short tons (1,599 t) of bombs: 96,000 people were made homeless.

== Operation Hurricane ==
In October 1944, Duisburg became the main target in Operation Hurricane a joint RAF Bomber Command and USAAF Eighth Air Force operation.

On 14 October 1944 just after daybreak, RAF Bomber Command sent "1,013 aircraft ... to [bomb] Duisburg with RAF fighters providing an escort. 957 bombers dropped [... 3,574 long tons (3,631 t)] of high explosive and [... 820 long tons (830 t)] of incendiaries on" the city for a loss of 14 aircraft. The same day the Eighth Air Force sent 1,251 heavy bombers escorted by 749 fighters to bomb targets in the area of Cologne.

Later that day, during the night of 14 October/15 October, 1,005 RAF bombers returned to Duisburg in two waves about two hours apart, and dropped a further 4,100 t (4,040 long tons) of high explosive and 490 long tons (500 t) of incendiaries for the loss of seven aircraft. The same night a further 230 aircraft destroyed Brunswick.

During Operation Hurricane nearly 8,900 long tons (9,000 t) of bombs fell on Duisburg in less than 24 hours, but the damage to Duisburg is difficult to assess because much of the documentation including the final report (Endbericht), is not held by the Duisburg state archive (Stadtarchiv). Extant records mention "Very serious property damage. A large number of people buried." and that at the Thyssen Mines III and IV eight days production was lost.

== Chronology ==
Chronology
Date	Air Force	Notes
12/13 June 1941	RAF Bomber Command	438 long tons (445 t) of bombs dropped.
5/6 April 1942	RAF Bomber Command	263 aircraft.
20/21 December 1942	RAF Bomber Command	232 aircraft. "The bombing force found that the target area was clear and claimed much damage."
26/27 March 1943	RAF Bomber Command	a "widely scattered raid" by 455 aircraft during the Battle of the Ruhr due to cloud cover and lack of Oboe marking
12/13 May 1943	RAF Bomber Command	With good marking and the Main Force delivering concentrated bombing, 577 bombers destroy the old city with 1,574 long tons (1,599 t) of bombs: 96,000 people are made homeless.
23 November 1944	U.S. Eighth Air Force	Over 140 B-17s escorted by 2 fighter groups bombed the benzol manufacturing plant near Gelsenkirchen and Marshalling Yards at Duisburg.
14/15 October 1944	RAF Bomber Command	During the morning, 957 Operation Hurricane bombers dropped 3,518 long tons (3,574 t) of high explosive and 820 tonnes of incendiaries. In the subsequent night raid, 1,005 bombers in 2 waves about 2 hours apart, dropped a further 3,980 long tons (4,040 t) of high explosive and 490 long tons (500 t) of incendiaries.
5 March 1945	U.S. Ninth Air Force	Among other missions over German the Ninth flew armed reconnaissance sorties over the Hamm-Duisburg area.
28 January 1945	U.S. Eighth Air Force	B-17 Bombers from the 34th Training Wingled by Command Pilot Robert M. Simpson dropped 29 tons of bombs while enduring lots of accurate flak.
12 April 1945	U.S. Ninth Air Force	Fighters of the Ninth the supported the XVI Corps as it continued fighting in the Duisburg and Dortmund areas during the destruction of the German armies of Army Group B surrounded and contained in the Ruhr pocket

== See also ==
- List of strategic bombing over Germany in World War II

== Bibliography ==
- Bomber Command Campaign Diary, Bomber Command 60th Anniversary, Royal Air Force, 6 April 2005, Wikidata Q131324214, archived from the original on 6 July 2007
- Carter, Kit C.; Mueller, Robert (1991) [1973], Combat Chronology 1941–1945, The Army Air Forces in World War II, Washington, D.C.: Center for Air Force History, ISBN 0-912799-68-4, LCCN 92115046, OCLC 231661533, OL 8320961M, Wikidata Q131293822
