= Operation Hurricane (1944) =

- Part of Strategic bombing during World War II
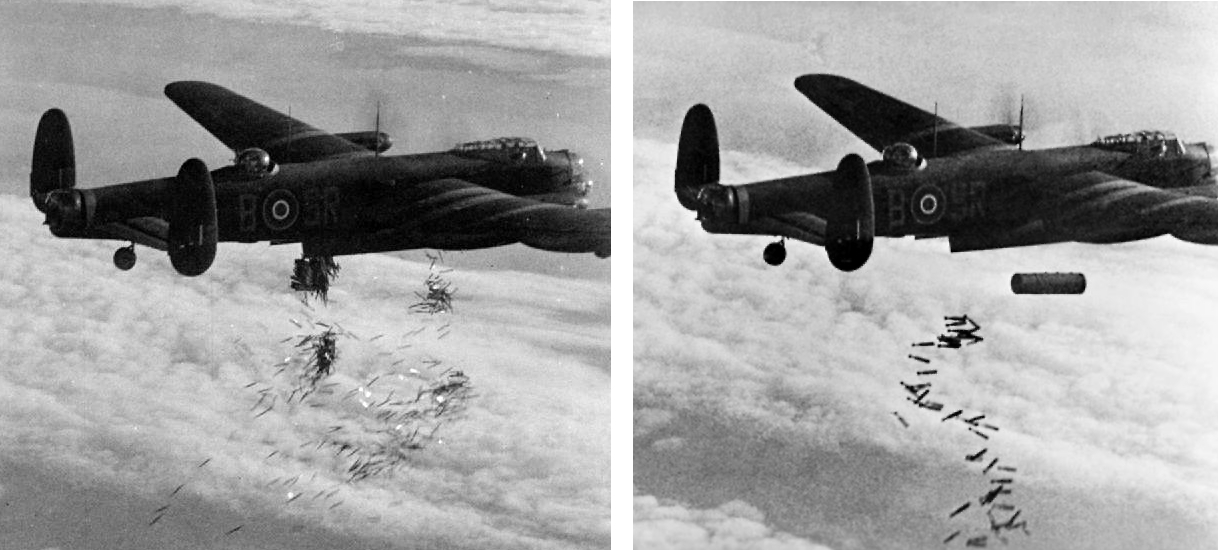
- "Window" radar jamming strips (left) and 30lb incendiaries and a 4,000 lb Blockbuster bomb (right) dropped from an Avro Lancaster over Duisburg on 14 October 1944
Date	14–15 October 1944
Location	Brunswick (Braunschweig), Cologne, Duisburg
Result	Duisburg: "Very serious property damage. A large number of people buried."

Belligerents
United Kingdom; United States	Germany

Strength
USAAF marshaling yards (1040 bombers · 491 fighters); 2,589 RAF sorties involving 1,013 RAF aircraft (Duisburg daytime raid); 1,005 RAF bombers (Duisburg nighttime raid); 240 RAF bombers (Brunswick (Braunschweig)); 323 aircraft (other operations); 10,050 long tons bombs dropped	

Casualties and losses
5 bombers · 1 fighter (USAAF marshaling yards); 14 aircraft (Duisburg daytime raid); 7 RAF aircraft (Duisburg night time raid); Brunswick (Braunschweig) uncertain	
- 2,500 civilians killed

Operation Hurricane was a 24-hour bombing operation to "demonstrate to the enemy in Germany generally the overwhelming superiority of the Allied Air Forces in this theatre" (in the directive to Harris ACO RAF Bomber Command) and "cause mass panic and disorginazation [sic] in the Ruhr, disrupt frontline communications and demonstrate the futility of resistance" (in the words of the Official RAF History).

During the day of 14 October 1944, 957 RAF Bomber Command aircraft dropped 3,574 long tons (3,631 t) of high explosive and 820 long tons (830 t) of incendiaries on Duisburg. Also during the day, USAAF VIII Bomber Command Mission 677 made PFF attacks on Cologne marshaling yards at Gereon, Gremberg, and Eifelter; as well as Euskirchen. A second RAF raid on Duisburg during the night of 14/15 October in two waves about two hours apart dropped a further 4,040 tonnes of high explosive and 500 tonnes of incendiaries. In some cases RAF crews flew both the daylight and night-time raids; a total of nearly eleven hours flying time in 24 hours. During the same night the RAF also bombed Brunswick (German: Braunschweig), destroying the town centre. Nearly fifty Mosquitos carried out nuisance raids and 132 aircraft from No. 100 Group targeted German night fighter operations.

In 24 hours, RAF Bomber Command had flown 2,589 sorties, losing 24 aircraft, dropping approximately 10,050 long tons (10,210 t) of bombs and killing over 2,500 civilians in Duisburg alone.
